= List of GameCube games =

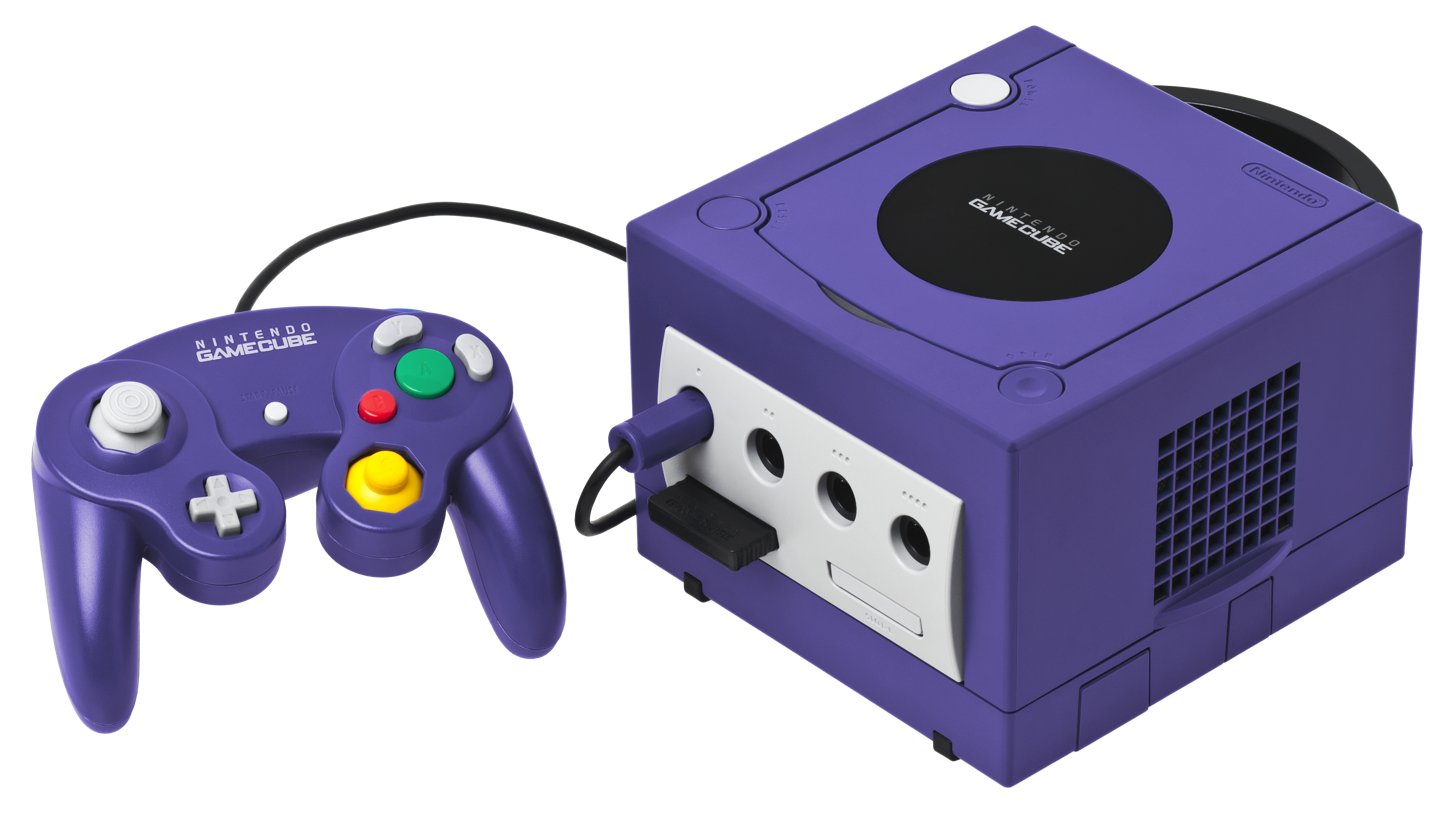
The GameCube and controller (Indigo color)

The GameCube is Nintendo's fourth home video game console, released during the sixth generation of video games. It is the successor to the Nintendo 64, and was first launched in Japan on September 14, 2001, followed by a launch in North America on November 18, 2001, and a launch in the PAL regions in May 2002. The successor to the GameCube is the Wii, which was first released in North America on November 19, 2006, and is backward compatible with GameCube games, memory cards, and controllers. Although later models would remove the controller ports and memory card slots required for backwards compatibility, they can be hardware modded back in. There are 651 (Note: This number is always up to date by this script.) games on this list. It is organized alphabetically by the games' localized English titles, or by rōmaji transliterations when exclusive to Japan. For a list of games that were announced or in development for the GameCube but never released, see the list of cancelled GameCube games.

== Games ==
Region code guide
Region	Description
Japan	Japanese (NTSC-J) formatted release.
North America	North America and other NTSC territories, besides Japan.
PAL	PAL formatted release. Territories includes much of Europe, Australia, New Zealand, and parts of Asia.

List of GameCube games
Title	Developer(s)	Publisher(s)	First released	Release date			Ref.
Title	Developer(s)	Publisher(s)	First released	Japan	North America	PAL	Ref.
18 Wheeler: American Pro Trucker	Sega AM2	Acclaim Entertainment	2002-02-20^{NA}	September 12, 2002	February 20, 2002	May 31, 2002	
1080° Avalanche	Nintendo Software Technology	Nintendo	2003-11-28^{PAL}	January 22, 2004	December 1, 2003	November 28, 2003	
2002 FIFA World Cup	EA Canada; Creations; Intelligent Games; Tose	EA Sports^{WW} Electronic Arts Square^{JP}	2002-04-30^{NA}	May 2, 2002	April 30, 2002	May 3, 2002^{EU} May 17, 2002^{AUS}	
2006 FIFA World Cup; FIFA World Cup: Germany 2006^{PAL}	EA Canada	EA Sports	2006-04-24^{NA}	Unreleased	April 24, 2006	April 28, 2006	
4x4 Evo 2	Terminal Reality	Universal Interactive	2002-09-24^{NA}	Unreleased	September 24, 2002	Unreleased	
The Adventures of Jimmy Neutron Boy Genius: Attack of the Twonkies	THQ Studio Australia	THQ	2004-09-13^{NA}	Unreleased	September 13, 2004	November 9, 2004^{AUS} February 11, 2005^{EU}	
The Adventures of Jimmy Neutron Boy Genius: Jet Fusion	Krome Studios	THQ	2003-09-16^{NA}	Unreleased	September 16, 2003	November 21, 2003^{EU} December 26, 2003^{AUS}	
Aggressive Inline	Z-Axis	AKA Acclaim	2002-08-01^{NA}	Unreleased	August 1, 2002	September 6, 2002	
Alien Hominid	The Behemoth	O~3 Entertainment	2004-11-23^{NA}	Unreleased	November 23, 2004	Unreleased	
All-Star Baseball 2002	Acclaim Studios Austin	Acclaim Sports	2001-11-18^{NA}	Unreleased	November 18, 2001	Unreleased	
All-Star Baseball 2003	Acclaim Studios Austin	Acclaim Sports	2002-03-07^{NA}	August 8, 2002	March 7, 2002	Unreleased	
All-Star Baseball 2004	Acclaim Studios Austin	Acclaim Sports	2003-02-28^{NA}	Unreleased	February 28, 2003	Unreleased	
Amazing Island	Ancient; Hitmaker	Sega	2004-01-15^{JP}	January 15, 2004	August 24, 2004	Unreleased	
American Chopper 2: Full Throttle	Creat Studios	Activision	2005-11-22^{NA}	Unreleased	November 22, 2005	Unreleased	
Animal Crossing	Nintendo EAD	Nintendo	2001-12-14^{JP}	December 14, 2001	September 16, 2002	September 15, 2003^{AUS} September 24, 2004^{EU}	
Animaniacs: The Great Edgar Hunt	Warthog Games	Ignition Entertainment	2005-05-27^{PAL}	Unreleased	September 14, 2005	May 27, 2005	
The Ant Bully	Artificial Mind and Movement	Midway	2006-07-24^{NA}	Unreleased	July 24, 2006	Unreleased	
Aquaman: Battle for Atlantis	Lucky Chicken Games	TDK Mediactive	2003-07-30^{NA}	Unreleased	July 30, 2003	Unreleased	
Army Men: Air Combat - The Elite Missions	Wide Games	The 3DO Company	2003-03-25^{NA}	Unreleased	March 25, 2003	Unreleased	
Army Men: RTS	Coyote Developments	Global Star Software	2004-11-02^{NA}	Unreleased	November 2, 2004	Unreleased	
Army Men: Sarge's War	Tactical Development	Global Star Software	2004-08-21^{NA}	Unreleased	August 21, 2004	Unreleased	
Asterix & Obelix XXL	Étranges Libellules	Atari Europe	2004-06-18^{EU}	Unreleased	Unreleased	June 18, 2004	
ATV: Quad Power Racing 2	Climax Brighton	AKA Acclaim	2003-01-22^{NA}	Unreleased	January 22, 2003	February 28, 2003	
Auto Modellista	Capcom Production Studio 1	Capcom	2003-07-03^{JP}	July 3, 2003	September 30, 2003	Unreleased	
Avatar: The Last Airbender; Avatar: The Legend of Aang^{PAL}	THQ Studio Australia	THQ	2006-10-10^{NA}	Unreleased	October 10, 2006	February 9, 2007	
Backyard Baseball	Humongous Entertainment	Infogrames	2003-03-31^{NA}	Unreleased	March 31, 2003	Unreleased	
Backyard Football	Left Field Productions	Infogrames	2002-10-10^{NA}	Unreleased	October 10, 2002	Unreleased	
Backyard Sports: Baseball 2007	GameBrains	Atari	2006-04-03^{NA}	Unreleased	April 3, 2006	Unreleased	
Bad Boys: Miami Takedown; Bad Boys II^{PAL}	Blitz Games	Crave Entertainment^{NA} Empire Interactive^{EU}	2004-09-21^{NA}	Unreleased	September 21, 2004	October 15, 2004	
Baldur's Gate: Dark Alliance	High Voltage Software	Interplay Entertainment	2002-11-20^{NA}	Unreleased	November 20, 2002	April 25, 2003	
Barnyard	Blue Tongue Entertainment	THQ	2006-08-01^{NA}	Unreleased	October 13, 2006	August 1, 2006	
The Baseball 2003: Battle Ballpark Sengen Perfect Play Pro Yakyū	Konami	Konami	2003-03-20^{JP}	March 20, 2003	Unreleased	Unreleased	
Baten Kaitos: Eternal Wings and the Lost Ocean	Monolith Soft; tri-Crescendo	Namco^{JP} Namco Hometek^{NA} Nintendo^{PAL}	2003-12-05^{JP}	December 5, 2003	November 16, 2004	April 1, 2005	
Baten Kaitos Origins	Monolith Soft; tri-Crescendo	Nintendo	2006-02-23^{JP}	February 23, 2006	September 25, 2006	Unreleased	
Batman Begins	Eurocom	EA Games; Warner Bros. Interactive Entertainment	2005-06-15^{NA}	Unreleased	June 15, 2005	June 17, 2005^{EU} June 27, 2005^{AUS}	
Batman: Dark Tomorrow	Kemco	Kemco	2003-03-18^{NA}	March 21, 2003	March 18, 2003	April 11, 2003	
Batman: Rise of Sin Tzu	Ubi Soft Montreal	Ubi Soft	2003-11-11^{NA}	Unreleased	November 11, 2003	December 5, 2003	
Batman: Vengeance	Ubi Soft Montreal	Ubi Soft	2001-11-18^{NA}	Unreleased	November 18, 2001	May 3, 2002^{EU} May 17, 2002^{AUS}	
Battalion Wars	Kuju London	Nintendo	2005-09-19^{NA}	October 27, 2005	September 19, 2005	December 9, 2005^{EU} February 16, 2006^{AUS}	
Battle Stadium D.O.N	Eighting; Q Entertainment	Namco Bandai Games	2006-07-20^{JP}	July 20, 2006	Unreleased	Unreleased	
Beach Spikers: Virtua Beach Volleyball	Sega AM2	Sega	2002-07-19^{JP}	July 19, 2002	August 14, 2002	September 27, 2002^{EU} October 4, 2002^{AUS}	
Beyblade VForce: Super Tournament Battle	A.I	Takara^{JP} Atari^{WW}	2002-12-19^{JP}	December 19, 2002	September 23, 2003	November 28, 2003	
Beyond Good & Evil	Ubisoft Pictures; Ubisoft Milan	Ubisoft	2003-12-10^{NA}	Unreleased	December 10, 2003	February 27, 2004	
Big Air Freestyle	Paradigm Entertainment	Infogrames	2002-09-13^{NA}	Unreleased	September 13, 2002	November 8, 2002^{EU} November 15, 2002^{AUS}	
Big Mutha Truckers	Eutechnyx	Empire Interactive^{PAL} THQ^{NA}	2003-06-27^{PAL}	Unreleased	August 14, 2003	June 27, 2003	
Billy Hatcher and the Giant Egg	Sonic Team	Sega	2003-09-23^{NA}	October 9, 2003	September 23, 2003	October 31, 2003	
Bionicle	Argonaut Games; Argonaut Sheffield	Electronic Arts; Lego Interactive	2003-10-20^{NA}	Unreleased	October 20, 2003	October 31, 2003	
Bionicle Heroes	Traveller's Tales	Eidos Interactive; TT Games Publishing	2006-11-14^{NA}	Unreleased	November 14, 2006	Unreleased	
Black & Bruised	Digital Fiction	Majesco^{NA} Vivendi Universal Games^{PAL}	2003-01-28^{NA}	Unreleased	January 28, 2003	June 27, 2003	
Bleach GC: Tasogare ni Mamieru Shinigami	Polygon Magic	Sega	2005-12-08^{JP}	December 8, 2005	Unreleased	Unreleased	
Blood Omen 2	Nixxes Software	Eidos Interactive	2002-12-04^{NA}	Unreleased	December 4, 2002	January 24, 2003	
BloodRayne	Terminal Reality	Majesco^{NA} Vivendi Universal Games^{PAL}	2002-10-31^{NA}	Unreleased	October 31, 2002	May 23, 2003	
Bloody Roar: Primal Fury	Eighting	Activision^{WW} Hudson Soft^{JP}	2002-03-19^{NA}	April 25, 2002	March 19, 2002	May 3, 2002^{EU} May 17, 2002^{AUS}	
BlowOut	Terminal Reality	Majesco	2003-11-26^{NA}	Unreleased	November 26, 2003	Unreleased	
BMX XXX	Z-Axis	AKA Acclaim	2002-11-25^{NA}	Unreleased	November 25, 2002	December 6, 2002	
Bobobo-bo Bo-bobo Dassutsu! Hajike Royale	Hudson Soft	Hudson Soft	2005-03-17^{JP}	March 17, 2005	Unreleased	Unreleased	
Bokujou Monogatari: Shiawase no Uta	Marvelous Interactive	Marvelous Interactive	2005-05-03^{JP}	May 3, 2005	Unreleased	Unreleased	
Bomberman Land 2	Racjin	Hudson Soft	2003-07-31^{JP}	July 31, 2003	Unreleased	Unreleased	
Bomberman Generation	Game Arts	Majesco^{NA} Hudson Soft^{JP} Vivendi Universal Games^{PAL}	2002-06-04^{NA}	June 27, 2002	June 4, 2002	December 6, 2002	
Bomberman Jetters	Hudson Soft	Hudson Soft^{JP} Majesco^{NA}	2002-12-19^{JP}	December 19, 2002	March 9, 2004	Unreleased	
Bratz: Forever Diamondz	Blitz Games	THQ	2006-09-18^{NA}	Unreleased	September 18, 2006	November 3, 2006	
Bratz: Rock Angelz	Blitz Games	THQ	2005-10-04^{NA}	Unreleased	October 4, 2005	October 14, 2005	
Buffy the Vampire Slayer: Chaos Bleeds	Eurocom	Vivendi Universal Games	2003-08-26^{NA}	Unreleased	August 26, 2003	October 24, 2003^{EU} October 29, 2003^{AUS}	
Burnout	Criterion Games	Acclaim Entertainment	2002-04-30^{NA}	Unreleased	April 30, 2002	May 3, 2002^{EU} May 17, 2002^{AUS}	
Burnout 2: Point of Impact	Criterion Games	Acclaim Entertainment	2003-04-08^{NA}	Unreleased	April 8, 2003	May 9, 2003^{EU} May 15, 2003^{AUS}	
Bust-a-Move 3000; Super Bust-a-Move All-Stars^{PAL}	Taito	Taito^{JP} Ubi Soft^{WW}	2003-02-12^{NA}	February 27, 2003	February 12, 2003	September 5, 2003	
Butt-Ugly Martians: Zoom or Doom	Runecraft	Vivendi Universal Games	2003-05-10^{PAL}	Unreleased	Unreleased	May 10, 2003	
Cabela's Big Game Hunter 2005 Adventures	Magic Wand Productions	Activision	2004-12-10^{NA}	Unreleased	December 10, 2004	Unreleased	
Cabela's Dangerous Hunts 2	Magic Wand Productions	Activision	2005-11-15^{NA}	Unreleased	November 15, 2005	Unreleased	
Cabela's Outdoor Adventures	Magic Wand Productions	Activision	2005-09-14^{NA}	Unreleased	September 14, 2005	Unreleased	
Call of Duty 2: Big Red One	High Voltage Software	Activision	2005-11-01^{NA}	Unreleased	November 1, 2005	November 18, 2005	
Call of Duty: Finest Hour	Exakt Entertainment	Activision	2004-11-16^{NA}	Unreleased	November 16, 2004	November 25, 2004^{AUS} December 3, 2004^{EU}	
Capcom vs. SNK 2 EO	Capcom	Capcom	2002-07-04^{JP}	July 4, 2002	September 24, 2002	September 12, 2002^{AUS} March 7, 2003^{EU}	
Captain Tsubasa: Ōgon Sedai no Chōsen	Konami	Konami	2002-09-12^{JP}	September 12, 2002	Unreleased	Unreleased	
Carmen Sandiego: The Secret of the Stolen Drums	Artificial Mind and Movement	BAM! Entertainment	2004-03-05^{PAL}	Unreleased	September 13, 2004	March 5, 2004	
Cars	Rainbow Studios	THQ	2006-06-06^{NA}	July 6, 2006	June 6, 2006	June 8, 2006^{AUS} July 14, 2006^{EU}	
Casper: Spirit Dimensions	Lucky Chicken Games	TDK Mediactive	2002-10-14^{NA}	Unreleased	October 14, 2002	February 14, 2003	
Castleween; Spirits & Spells^{NA}	Wanadoo Edition	Wanadoo Edition^{PAL} MTO^{JP} DreamCatcher Interactive^{NA}	2003-05-30^{PAL}	June 19, 2003	September 29, 2003	May 30, 2003	
Catwoman	Argonaut Games; EA UK	EA Games	2004-07-23^{NA}	Unreleased	July 23, 2004	July 30, 2004^{AUS} August 6, 2004^{EU}	
Cel Damage	Pseudo Interactive	EA Games	2002-01-07^{NA}	Unreleased	January 7, 2002	May 3, 2002^{EU} May 17, 2002^{AUS}	
Chaos Field	MileStone	Sega^{JP} O~3 Entertainment^{NA}	2005-02-24^{JP}	February 24, 2005	December 20, 2005	Unreleased	
Charinko Hero	tri-Ace	Banpresto	2003-07-17^{JP}	July 17, 2003	Unreleased	Unreleased	
Charlie and the Chocolate Factory	High Voltage Software	Global Star Software	2005-07-22^{WW}	Unreleased	July 22, 2005	July 22, 2005	
Charlie's Angels	Neko Entertainment	Ubi Soft	2003-07-08^{NA}	Unreleased	July 8, 2003	July 25, 2003	
Chibi-Robo!	Skip Ltd.	Nintendo	2005-06-23^{JP}	June 23, 2005	February 8, 2006	May 26, 2006	
Chicken Little	Avalanche Software	Buena Vista Games^{WW} D3 Publisher^{JP}	2005-10-18^{NA}	December 15, 2005	October 18, 2005	January 6, 2006	
The Chronicles of Narnia: The Lion, the Witch and the Wardrobe	Traveller's Tales	Buena Vista Games	2005-11-15^{NA}	Unreleased	November 15, 2005	March 31, 2006	
City Racer	Ubi Soft Bucharest	Ubi Soft	2003-04-29^{NA}	Unreleased	April 29, 2003	Unreleased	
Cocoto Funfair	Neko Entertainment	BigBen Interactive	2006-04-07^{PAL}	Unreleased	Unreleased	April 7, 2006	
Cocoto Kart Racer	Neko Entertainment	BigBen Interactive	2005-04-22^{PAL}	Unreleased	Unreleased	April 22, 2005	
Cocoto Platform Jumper	Neko Entertainment	BigBen Interactive	2004-12-10^{PAL}	Unreleased	Unreleased	December 10, 2004	
Codename: Kids Next Door – Operation: V.I.D.E.O.G.A.M.E.	High Voltage Software	Global Star Software	2005-10-11^{NA}	Unreleased	October 11, 2005	December 2, 2005	
Conan	Cauldron	TDK Mediactive Europe	2005-04-30^{PAL}	Unreleased	Unreleased	April 30, 2005	
Conflict: Desert Storm	Pivotal Games	SCi Games^{PAL} Gotham Games^{NA}	2003-04-18^{EU}	Unreleased	April 22, 2003	April 18, 2003^{EU} May 9, 2003^{AUS}	
Conflict: Desert Storm II - Back to Baghdad	Pivotal Games	Gotham Games^{NA} SCi Games^{PAL}	2004-01-06^{NA}	Unreleased	January 6, 2004	February 6, 2004^{EU} February 20, 2004^{AUS}	
Crash Bandicoot: The Wrath of Cortex	Eurocom	Universal Interactive^{WW} Konami^{JP}	2002-09-17^{NA}	December 4, 2003	September 17, 2002	November 1, 2002	
Crash Nitro Kart	Vicarious Visions	Universal Interactive^{WW} Konami^{JP}	2003-11-11^{NA}	July 8, 2004	November 11, 2003	November 28, 2003^{EU} December 3, 2003^{AUS}	
Crash Tag Team Racing	Radical Entertainment	Vivendi Universal Games	2005-10-21^{NA}	December 1, 2005	October 21, 2005	November 3, 2005^{AUS} November 4, 2005^{EU}	
Crazy Taxi	Acclaim Studios Cheltenham	Acclaim Entertainment^{WW} Sega^{JP}	2001-11-18^{NA}	May 30, 2002	November 18, 2001	May 3, 2002^{EU} May 17, 2002^{AUS}	
Cubivore: Survival of the Fittest	Saru Brunei; Intelligent Systems	Nintendo^{JP} Atlus^{NA}	2002-02-21^{JP}	February 21, 2002	November 5, 2002	Unreleased	
Cubix Robots for Everyone: Showdown	Blitz Games	The 3DO Company	2003-06-02^{NA}	Unreleased	June 2, 2003	Unreleased	
Curious George	Monkey Bar Games	Namco Hometek	2006-02-01^{NA}	Unreleased	February 1, 2006	Unreleased	
Custom Robo	Noise	Nintendo	2004-03-04^{JP}	March 4, 2004	May 10, 2004	Unreleased	
Dakar 2: The World's Ultimate Rally	Acclaim Studios Cheltenham	Acclaim Entertainment	2003-03-28^{PAL}	Unreleased	March 31, 2003	March 28, 2003	
Dance Dance Revolution: Mario Mix; Dancing Stage Mario Mix^{PAL}	Konami	Nintendo	2005-07-14^{JP}	July 14, 2005	October 24, 2005	October 28, 2005^{EU} November 24, 2005^{AUS}	
Darkened Skye	Boston Animation	Simon & Schuster Interactive^{NA} TDK Mediactive Europe^{PAL}	2002-11-12^{NA}	Unreleased	November 12, 2002	May 30, 2003	
Dark Summit	Radical Entertainment	THQ	2002-02-05^{NA}	Unreleased	February 5, 2002	May 17, 2002^{AUS} May 24, 2002^{EU}	
Dave Mirra Freestyle BMX 2	Z-Axis	Acclaim Max Sports	2001-11-18^{NA}	Unreleased	November 18, 2001	May 3, 2002^{EU} May 17, 2002^{AUS}	
Dead to Rights	Namco Hometek	Namco Hometek^{NA} Electronic Arts^{PAL}	2002-11-25^{NA}	Unreleased	November 25, 2002	August 22, 2003	
Def Jam: Fight for NY	AKI Corporation; EA Canada	EA Games	2004-09-21^{NA}	Unreleased	September 21, 2004	October 1, 2004	
Def Jam Vendetta	AKI Corporation; EA Canada	EA Sports BIG	2003-04-01^{NA}	Unreleased	April 1, 2003	May 23, 2003^{EU} June 16, 2003^{AUS}	
Defender; Defender: For All Mankind^{PAL}	Inevitable Entertainment	Midway	2002-11-04^{NA}	Unreleased	November 4, 2002	March 24, 2003	
Densetsu no Quiz Ou Ketteisen	Hudson Soft	Nintendo	2005-12-08^{JP}	December 8, 2005	Unreleased	Unreleased	
Derby Tsuku 3: Derby Uma o Tsukurou!	Smilebit; Land Ho!	Sega	2003-12-11^{JP}	December 11, 2003	Unreleased	Unreleased	
Die Hard: Vendetta	Bits Studios	Vivendi Universal Games International^{PAL} Sierra Entertainment^{NA}	2002-11-15^{PAL}	Unreleased	November 19, 2002	November 15, 2002	
Digimon Rumble Arena 2	Bandai; Black Ship Games	Bandai	2004-07-29^{JP}	July 29, 2004	September 6, 2004	October 15, 2004^{EU} November 19, 2004^{AUS}	
Digimon World 4	BEC	Bandai	2005-01-06^{JP}	January 6, 2005	June 2, 2005	Unreleased	
Dinotopia: The Sunstone Odyssey	Vicious Cycle Software	TDK Mediactive	2003-07-31^{NA}	Unreleased	July 31, 2003	Unreleased	
Disney Sports Basketball	Konami Computer Entertainment Osaka; Polygon Magic	Konami	2002-12-19^{JP}	December 19, 2002	January 14, 2003	April 4, 2003^{AUS} June 6, 2003^{EU}	
Disney Sports Football; Disney Sports: American Football^{JP}	Konami Computer Entertainment Osaka	Konami	2002-12-12^{JP}	December 12, 2002	December 17, 2002	Unreleased	
Disney Sports Skateboarding	Konami Computer Entertainment Osaka	Konami	2002-09-19^{JP}	September 19, 2002	November 12, 2002	March 7, 2003^{EU} March 21, 2003^{AUS}	
Disney Sports Soccer; Disney Sports: Football^{PAL}	Konami Computer Entertainment Osaka	Konami	2002-07-18^{JP}	July 18, 2002	November 12, 2002	February 7, 2003^{EU} February 21, 2003^{AUS}	
Disney's Extreme Skate Adventure	Toys for Bob	Activision	2003-09-03^{NA}	Unreleased	September 3, 2003	September 5, 2003	
Disney's Hide & Sneak	Capcom	Capcom	2003-11-18^{NA}	December 4, 2003	November 18, 2003	March 19, 2004	
Disney's Magical Mirror Starring Mickey Mouse	Capcom; Polygon Magic	Nintendo	2002-08-09^{JP}	August 9, 2002	August 13, 2002	September 13, 2002^{EU} September 19, 2002^{AUS}	
Disney's Party	Neverland	Hudson Soft^{JP} Electronic Arts^{WW}	2002-08-01^{JP}	August 1, 2002	September 16, 2003	October 17, 2003	
Dōbutsu no Mori e+	Nintendo EAD	Nintendo	2003-06-27^{JP}	June 27, 2003	Unreleased	Unreleased	
Dokapon DX: Wataru Sekai wa Oni Darake	Asmik Ace Entertainment	Asmik Ace Entertainment	2003-04-10^{JP}	April 10, 2003	Unreleased	Unreleased	
Donald Duck: Goin' Quackers; Donald Duck: Quack Attack^{PAL}	Ubi Soft Montreal	Ubi Soft	2002-03-26^{NA}	Unreleased	March 26, 2002	May 3, 2002^{EU} May 17, 2002^{AUS}	
Donkey Konga	Namco	Nintendo	2003-12-12^{JP}	December 12, 2003	September 27, 2004	October 15, 2004^{EU} October 28, 2004^{AUS}	
Donkey Konga 2	Namco	Nintendo	2004-07-01^{JP}	July 1, 2004	May 9, 2005	June 3, 2005	
Donkey Konga 3	Namco	Nintendo	2005-03-17^{JP}	March 17, 2005	Unreleased	Unreleased	
Donkey Kong Jungle Beat	Nintendo EAD Tokyo	Nintendo	2004-12-16^{JP}	December 16, 2004	March 14, 2005	February 4, 2005	
Doraemon: Minna de Asobō! Minidorando	Shogakukan	Shogakukan	2003-07-18^{JP}	July 18, 2003	Unreleased	Unreleased	
Dora the Explorer: Journey to the Purple Planet	Monkey Bar Games	Global Star Software	2005-10-13^{NA}	Unreleased	October 13, 2005	December 16, 2005	
DreamMix TV World Fighters	Bitstep	Hudson Soft	2003-12-18^{JP}	December 18, 2003	Unreleased	Unreleased	
Doshin the Giant	Param	Nintendo	2002-03-14^{JP}	March 14, 2002	Unreleased	September 20, 2002	
Dr. Muto	Midway Games West	Midway	2002-12-17^{NA}	Unreleased	December 17, 2002	Unreleased	
Dragon Ball Z: Budokai	Pyramid, Inc.	Atari^{NA} Bandai^{PAL/JP}	2003-10-28^{NA}	November 28, 2003	October 28, 2003	November 14, 2003	
Dragon Ball Z: Budokai 2	Pyramid, Inc.	Atari^{NA/AUS} Bandai^{EU/JP}	2004-12-15^{NA}	Unreleased	December 15, 2004	March 18, 2005^{EU} April 8, 2005^{AUS}	
Dragon Ball Z: Sagas	Avalanche Software	Atari	2005-03-22^{NA}	Unreleased	March 22, 2005	Unreleased	
Dragon Drive: D-Masters Shot	Treasure	Bandai	2003-08-08^{JP}	August 8, 2003	Unreleased	Unreleased	
Dragon's Lair 3D: Return to the Lair; Dragon's Lair 3D: Special Edition^{PAL}	Dragonstone Software	Encore Software^{NA} THQ^{PAL}	2003-01-06^{NA}	Unreleased	January 6, 2003	March 26, 2004	
Driven	Crawfish Interactive	BAM! Entertainment	2002-03-26^{NA}	Unreleased	March 26, 2002	May 3, 2002^{EU} May 17, 2002^{AUS}	
Drome Racers	Attention to Detail	Electronic Arts; Lego Interactive	2003-09-16^{NA}	Unreleased	September 16, 2003	September 19, 2003	
Duel Masters: Nettō! Battle Arena	AI	Takara	2003-12-18^{JP}	December 18, 2003	Unreleased	Unreleased	
Ed, Edd n Eddy: The Mis-Edventures	Artificial Mind and Movement	Midway	2005-10-31^{NA}	Unreleased	October 31, 2005	Unreleased	
Egg Mania: Eggstreme Madness; Eggo Mania^{PAL}	HotGen	Kemco^{WW} Kotobuki Systems^{JP}	2002-09-11^{NA}	September 27, 2002	September 11, 2002	October 25, 2002	
Eisei Meijin VI	Konami	Konami	2002-09-26^{JP}	September 26, 2002	Unreleased	Unreleased	
Enter the Matrix	Shiny Entertainment	Infogrames^{WW} Bandai^{JP}	2003-05-15^{WW}	May 15, 2003	May 15, 2003	May 15, 2003	
ESPN International Winter Sports 2002; International Winter Sports^{PAL}	Konami Computer Entertainment Osaka	Konami	2002-01-29^{NA}	January 31, 2002	January 29, 2002	May 3, 2002	
ESPN MLS ExtraTime 2002	Konami Computer Entertainment Hawaii	Konami	2002-04-02^{NA}	Unreleased	April 2, 2002	Unreleased	
Eternal Darkness: Sanity's Requiem	Silicon Knights	Nintendo	2002-06-24^{NA}	October 25, 2002	June 24, 2002	November 1, 2002^{EU} November 7, 2002^{AUS}	
Evolution Skateboarding	Konami Computer Entertainment Osaka	Konami	2002-11-17^{NA}	December 12, 2002	November 17, 2002	February 21, 2003	
Evolution Snowboarding	Konami Computer Entertainment Osaka	Konami	2003-02-25^{NA}	Unreleased	February 25, 2003	March 28, 2003	
Evolution Worlds	Sting Entertainment	Entertainment Software Publishing^{JP} Ubi Soft^{WW}	2002-07-26^{JP}	July 26, 2002	December 2, 2002	March 7, 2003	
Extreme-G 3	Acclaim Studios Cheltenham	Acclaim Entertainment	2001-11-27^{NA}	March 15, 2002	November 27, 2001	May 3, 2002^{EU} May 17, 2002^{AUS}	
F-Zero GX	Amusement Vision	Nintendo	2003-07-25^{JP}	July 25, 2003	August 25, 2003	October 24, 2003^{AUS} October 31, 2003^{EU}	
F1 2002	Visual Science	EA Sports	2002-06-24^{NA}	Unreleased	June 24, 2002	July 19, 2002	
F1 Career Challenge	Visual Science	EA Sports	2003-06-23^{AUS}	Unreleased	June 24, 2003	June 23, 2003^{AUS} June 27, 2003^{EU}	
The Fairly OddParents: Breakin' Da Rules	Blitz Games	THQ	2003-11-10^{NA}	Unreleased	November 10, 2003	Unreleased	
The Fairly OddParents: Shadow Showdown	Blitz Games	THQ	2004-09-09^{NA}	Unreleased	September 9, 2004	Unreleased	
Family Stadium 2003	Namco	Namco	2003-05-30^{JP}	May 30, 2003	Unreleased	Unreleased	
Fantastic Four	7 Studios	Activision	2005-06-27^{NA}	Unreleased	June 27, 2005	July 15, 2005	
FIFA 06; FIFA Soccer 06^{NA}	EA Canada	EA Sports	2005-09-30^{EU}	Unreleased	October 4, 2005	September 30, 2005^{EU} October 3, 2006^{AUS}	
FIFA 07; FIFA Soccer 07^{NA}	EA Canada	EA Sports	2006-09-28^{AUS}	Unreleased	October 3, 2006	September 28, 2006^{AUS} September 29, 2006^{EU}	
FIFA Football 2003; FIFA Soccer 2003^{NA}	EA Canada	EA Sports^{WW} Electronic Arts Square^{JP}	2002-11-01^{PAL}	December 6, 2002	November 14, 2002	November 1, 2002	
FIFA Football 2004; FIFA Soccer 2004^{NA}	EA Canada	EA Sports	2003-10-24^{PAL}	Unreleased	November 4, 2003	October 24, 2003	
FIFA Football 2005; FIFA Soccer 2005^{NA}	EA Canada	EA Sports	2004-10-08^{EU}	Unreleased	October 12, 2004	October 8, 2004^{EU} October 12, 2004^{AUS}	
FIFA Soccer 2002: Major League Soccer	EA Canada	Electronic Arts Square^{JP} EA Sports^{NA}	2001-11-15^{JP}	November 15, 2001	November 21, 2001	Unreleased	
FIFA Street	EA Canada	EA Sports BIG	2005-02-22^{NA}	Unreleased	February 22, 2005	March 11, 2005	
FIFA Street 2	EA Canada	EA Sports BIG	2006-02-28^{WW}	Unreleased	February 28, 2006	February 28, 2006	
Fight Night Round 2	EA Chicago	EA Sports	2005-03-01^{NA}	September 1, 2005	March 1, 2005	March 18, 2005^{EU} March 22, 2005^{AUS}	
Final Fantasy Crystal Chronicles	The Game Designers Studio	Nintendo	2003-08-08^{JP}	August 8, 2003	February 9, 2004	March 12, 2004^{EU} March 19, 2004^{AUS}	
Finding Nemo	Traveller's Tales	THQ^{WW} Yuke's^{JP}	2003-05-09^{NA}	December 6, 2003	May 9, 2003	September 3, 2003^{AUS} September 26, 2003^{EU}	
Fire Blade	Kuju Entertainment	Midway	2002-12-29^{NA}	Unreleased	December 29, 2002	February 7, 2003	
Fire Emblem: Path of Radiance	Intelligent Systems; Nintendo SPD	Nintendo	2005-04-20^{JP}	April 20, 2005	October 17, 2005	November 4, 2005^{EU} December 1, 2005^{AUS}	
Flushed Away	Monkey Bar Games	D3 Publisher	2006-10-24^{NA}	Unreleased	October 24, 2006	December 1, 2006	
Franklin: A Birthday Surprise	Neko Entertainment	The Game Factory	2006-06-16^{EU}	Unreleased	Unreleased	June 16, 2006	
Freaky Flyers	Point of View	Midway	2003-08-04^{NA}	Unreleased	August 4, 2003	Unreleased	
Freedom Fighters	IO Interactive	EA Games	2003-09-25^{AUS}	Unreleased	October 1, 2003	September 25, 2003^{AUS} September 26, 2003^{EU}	
Freekstyle	Hypnos Entertainment	EA Sports BIG	2002-09-04^{NA}	Unreleased	September 4, 2002	September 20, 2002	
Freestyle MetalX	Deibus Studios	Midway Sports Asylum	2003-10-03^{NA}	Unreleased	October 3, 2003	Unreleased	
Freestyle Street Soccer; Urban Freestyle Soccer^{PAL}	Gusto Games	Acclaim Entertainment	2004-02-12^{NA}	Unreleased	February 12, 2004	March 5, 2004	
Frogger: Ancient Shadow	Hudson Soft	Konami	2005-09-27^{NA}	Unreleased	September 27, 2005	Unreleased	
Frogger Beyond	Konami Computer Entertainment Hawaii; Konami Software Shanghai	Konami	2002-12-05^{NA}	June 5, 2003	December 5, 2002	June 27, 2003	
Frogger's Adventures: The Rescue	Hudson Soft	Konami	2003-10-28^{NA}	Unreleased	October 28, 2003	Unreleased	
From TV Animation – One Piece: Treasure Battle!	BEC	Bandai	2002-11-01^{JP}	November 1, 2002	Unreleased	Unreleased	
Future Tactics: The Uprising	Zed Two	Crave Entertainment^{NA} JoWooD Productions^{PAL}	2004-05-07^{NA}	Unreleased	May 7, 2004	October 22, 2004	
Gakuen Toshi Vara Noir	Idea Factory	Idea Factory	2004-01-23^{JP}	January 23, 2004	Unreleased	Unreleased	
Gauntlet Dark Legacy	Midway Games West	Midway	2002-03-05^{NA}	Unreleased	March 5, 2002	July 19, 2002	
Geist	n-Space	Nintendo	2005-08-15^{NA}	Unreleased	August 15, 2005	October 7, 2005^{EU} November 3, 2005^{AUS}	
Gekitō Pro Yakyū	Wow Entertainment	Sega	2003-09-11^{JP}	September 11, 2003	Unreleased	Unreleased	
Generation of Chaos Exceed: Yami no Miko Rose	Idea Factory	Idea Factory	2003-02-06^{JP}	February 6, 2003	Unreleased	Unreleased	
Giftpia	Skip Ltd.	Nintendo	2003-04-25^{JP}	April 25, 2003	Unreleased	Unreleased	
Gladius	LucasArts	LucasArts^{NA} Activision^{PAL}	2003-11-03^{NA}	Unreleased	November 3, 2003	November 28, 2003	
Go! Go! Hypergrind	Poponchi	Atlus	2003-11-18^{NA}	Unreleased	November 18, 2003	Unreleased	
Goblin Commander: Unleash the Horde	Jaleco Entertainment	Jaleco Entertainment	2003-12-16^{NA}	Unreleased	December 16, 2003	July 16, 2004	
Godzilla: Destroy All Monsters Melee	Pipeworks Software	Infogrames	2002-10-15^{NA}	December 12, 2002	October 15, 2002	November 15, 2002	
GoldenEye: Rogue Agent	EA Los Angeles	EA Games	2004-11-22^{NA}	January 13, 2005	November 22, 2004	November 30, 2004^{AUS} December 3, 2004^{EU}	
Gotcha Force	Capcom	Capcom	2003-11-27^{JP}	November 27, 2003	December 5, 2003	February 20, 2004	
The Grim Adventures of Billy & Mandy	High Voltage Software	Midway	2006-09-25^{NA}	Unreleased	September 25, 2006	Unreleased	
Grooverider: Slot Car Thunder	King of the Jungle	Encore Software	2003-09-25^{NA}	Unreleased	September 25, 2003	Unreleased	
GT Cube	MTO	MTO	2003-06-20^{JP}	June 20, 2003	Unreleased	Unreleased	
Gun	Neversoft	Activision	2005-11-08^{NA}	Unreleased	November 8, 2005	November 9, 2005^{AUS} November 25, 2005^{EU}	
Gurando Batoru! 3	Ganbarion	Bandai	2003-12-11^{JP}	December 11, 2003	Unreleased	Unreleased	
Happy Feet	Artificial Mind and Movement	Midway	2006-11-14^{NA}	Unreleased	November 14, 2006	Unreleased	
Harry Potter and the Chamber of Secrets	Eurocom	EA Games^{WW} Electronic Arts Square^{JP}	2002-11-15^{WW}	November 23, 2002	November 15, 2002	November 15, 2002	
Harry Potter and the Goblet of Fire	EA UK	Electronic Arts	2005-11-08^{NA}	November 26, 2005	November 8, 2005	November 11, 2005	
Harry Potter and the Philosopher's Stone; Harry Potter and the Sorcerer's Stone^{NA}	Warthog Games	EA Games	2003-12-11^{JP}	December 11, 2003	December 12, 2003	December 12, 2003	
Harry Potter and the Prisoner of Azkaban	EA UK	EA Games	2004-05-29^{NA}	June 26, 2004	May 29, 2004	June 2, 2004	
Harry Potter: Quidditch World Cup	EA UK	EA Games	2003-10-28^{NA}	November 13, 2003	October 28, 2003	November 7, 2003	
Harvest Moon: Another Wonderful Life	Marvelous Interactive	Marvelous Interactive^{JP} Natsume Inc.^{NA}	2004-07-08^{JP}	July 8, 2004	July 26, 2005	Unreleased	
Harvest Moon: Magical Melody	Marvelous Interactive	Marvelous Interactive^{JP} Natsume Inc.^{NA}	2005-11-10^{JP}	November 10, 2005	March 28, 2006	Unreleased	
Harvest Moon: A Wonderful Life	Marvelous Interactive	Marvelous Interactive^{JP} Natsume Inc.^{WW}	2003-09-12^{JP}	September 12, 2003	March 16, 2004	March 26, 2004	
The Haunted Mansion	High Voltage Software	TDK Mediactive	2003-10-16^{NA}	Unreleased	October 16, 2003	Unreleased	
Hello Kitty: Roller Rescue	XPEC Entertainment	Namco Hometek^{NA} Empire Interactive^{PAL}	2005-08-16^{NA}	Unreleased	August 16, 2005	September 9, 2005	
Hikaru no Go 3	Konami	Konami	2003-03-20^{JP}	March 20, 2003	Unreleased	Unreleased	
Hitman 2: Silent Assassin	IO Interactive	Eidos Interactive	2003-06-17^{NA}	Unreleased	June 17, 2003	June 27, 2003	
The Hobbit	Inevitable Entertainment	Vivendi Universal Games	2003-11-11^{NA}	Unreleased	November 11, 2003	November 28, 2003	
Homeland	Chunsoft	Chunsoft	2005-04-29^{JP}	April 29, 2005	Unreleased	Unreleased	
Home Run King	Wow Entertainment	Sega	2002-03-19^{NA}	Unreleased	March 19, 2002	Unreleased	
Hot Wheels: Velocity X	Beyond Games	THQ	2002-11-06^{NA}	Unreleased	November 6, 2002	November 29, 2002	
Hot Wheels: World Race	Climax Brighton	THQ	2003-10-28^{NA}	Unreleased	October 28, 2003	November 28, 2003	
Hudson Selection Vol. 1: Lode Runner	Red Entertainment	Hudson Soft	2003-07-10^{JP}	July 10, 2003	Unreleased	Unreleased	
Hudson Selection Vol. 2: Star Soldier	Red Entertainment	Hudson Soft	2003-07-10^{JP}	July 10, 2003	Unreleased	Unreleased	
Hudson Selection Vol. 3: PC Genjin	Red Entertainment	Hudson Soft	2003-12-04^{JP}	December 4, 2003	Unreleased	Unreleased	
Hudson Selection Vol. 4: Takahashi Meijin no Bōken Jima	Red Entertainment	Hudson Soft	2003-12-18^{JP}	December 18, 2003	Unreleased	Unreleased	
Hulk	Radical Entertainment	Universal Interactive	2003-05-28^{NA}	Unreleased	May 28, 2003	June 13, 2003^{EU} June 26, 2003^{AUS}	
Hunter: The Reckoning	High Voltage Software	Interplay Entertainment	2002-11-19^{NA}	Unreleased	November 19, 2002	July 25, 2003	
I-Ninja	Argonaut Games	Namco Hometek	2003-12-04^{NA}	Unreleased	December 4, 2003	Unreleased	
Ice Age 2: The Meltdown	Eurocom	Vivendi Universal Games	2006-03-14^{NA}	Unreleased	March 14, 2006	March 31, 2006	
Ikaruga	Treasure; G.rev	Infogrames	2003-01-16^{JP}	January 16, 2003	April 15, 2003	May 9, 2003	
The Incredible Hulk: Ultimate Destruction	Radical Entertainment	Vivendi Universal Games	2005-08-23^{NA}	Unreleased	August 23, 2005	September 9, 2005	
The Incredibles	Heavy Iron Studios	THQ^{WW} D3 Publisher^{JP}	2004-11-01^{NA}	December 2, 2004	November 1, 2004	November 5, 2004^{EU} November 16, 2004^{AUS}	
The Incredibles: Rise of the Underminer	Heavy Iron Studios	THQ^{WW} Sega^{JP}	2005-11-01^{NA}	February 9, 2006	November 1, 2005	November 25, 2005	
Intellivision Lives!	Realtime Associates	Crave Entertainment	2004-11-04^{NA}	Unreleased	November 4, 2004	Unreleased	
International Superstar Soccer 2 Jikkyō World Soccer 2002^{JP}	Konami	Konami	2002-03-14^{JP}	March 14, 2002	Unreleased	May 3, 2002^{EU} May 17, 2002^{AUS}	
International Superstar Soccer 3	Konami Computer Entertainment Osaka	Konami	2003-03-14^{JP}	May 30, 2003	Unreleased	Unreleased	
The Italian Job	Climax Brighton	Eidos Interactive	2003-07-15^{NA}	Unreleased	July 15, 2003	September 12, 2003^{EU} September 19, 2003^{AUS}	
James Bond 007: Agent Under Fire	EA Redwood Shores; EA Canada	EA Games	2002-03-12^{NA}	Unreleased	March 12, 2002	June 14, 2002	
James Bond 007: Everything or Nothing	EA Redwood Shores; EA Canada	EA Games	2004-02-11^{JP}	February 11, 2004	February 17, 2004	February 27, 2004	
James Bond 007: From Russia with Love	EA Redwood Shores	Electronic Arts	2005-11-15^{NA}	Unreleased	November 15, 2005	November 18, 2005^{EU} November 21, 2005^{AUS}	
James Bond 007: Nightfire	Eurocom	EA Games	2002-11-19^{NA}	Unreleased	November 19, 2002	November 29, 2002	
Jeremy McGrath Supercross World	Acclaim Studios Salt Lake City	Acclaim Max Sports	2002-02-26^{NA}	Unreleased	February 26, 2002	June 7, 2002	
Jikkyō Powerful Major League	Konami	Konami	2006-05-11^{JP}	May 11, 2006	Unreleased	Unreleased	
Jikkyō Powerful Pro Yakyū 9	Konami	Konami	2002-07-18^{JP}	July 18, 2002	Unreleased	Unreleased	
Jikkyō Powerful Pro Yakyū 9 Ketteiban	Konami	Konami	2002-12-19^{JP}	December 19, 2002	Unreleased	Unreleased	
Jikkyō Powerful Pro Yakyū 10	Konami	Konami	2003-07-17^{JP}	July 17, 2003	Unreleased	Unreleased	
Jikkyō Powerful Pro Yakyū 10 Chou Ketteiban	Konami	Konami	2003-12-18^{JP}	December 18, 2003	Unreleased	Unreleased	
Jikkyō Powerful Pro Yakyū 11	Konami	Konami	2004-07-15^{JP}	July 15, 2004	Unreleased	Unreleased	
Jikkyō Powerful Pro Yakyū 11 Chou Ketteiban	Konami	Konami	2004-12-16^{JP}	December 16, 2004	Unreleased	Unreleased	
Jikkyō Powerful Pro Yakyū 12	Konami	Konami	2005-07-14^{JP}	July 14, 2005	Unreleased	Unreleased	
Jikkyō Powerful Pro Yakyū 12 Ketteiban	Konami	Konami	2005-12-15^{JP}	December 15, 2005	Unreleased	Unreleased	
Jimmy Neutron: Boy Genius	Big Sky Interactive	THQ	2002-12-16^{NA}	Unreleased	December 16, 2002	March 7, 2003	
Judge Dredd: Dredd vs. Death	Rebellion Developments	Vivendi Universal Games International^{PAL} Evolved Games^{NA}	2003-12-12^{PAL}	Unreleased	March 1, 2005	December 12, 2003	
Kao the Kangaroo: Round 2	Tate Interactive	JoWooD Productions^{PAL} Atari^{NA}	2005-04-15^{PAL}	Unreleased	March 21, 2006	April 15, 2005	
Karaoke Revolution Party	Harmonix	Konami	2005-11-08^{NA}	Unreleased	November 8, 2005	Unreleased	
Kelly Slater's Pro Surfer	Treyarch	Activision O2	2002-09-17^{NA}	Unreleased	September 17, 2002	October 14, 2002^{AUS} October 18, 2002^{EU}	
Kidō Senshi Gundam: Gundam vs. Z Gundam	Capcom	Bandai	2004-12-09^{JP}	December 9, 2004	Unreleased	Unreleased	
Kidō Senshi Gundam: Senshitachi no Kiseki	Bandai	Bandai	2004-03-18^{JP}	March 18, 2004	Unreleased	Unreleased	
Killer7	Grasshopper Manufacture; Capcom Production Studio 4	Capcom	2005-06-09^{JP}	June 9, 2005	July 5, 2005	July 15, 2005	
King Arthur	Krome Studios	Konami	2004-11-16^{NA}	Unreleased	November 16, 2004	February 25, 2005	
Kirby Air Ride	HAL Laboratory	Nintendo	2003-07-11^{JP}	July 11, 2003	October 13, 2003	February 27, 2004^{EU} March 30, 2004^{AUS}	
Kiwame Mahjong DX2	Athena	Athena	2002-08-09^{JP}	August 9, 2002	Unreleased	Unreleased	
Knights of the Temple: Infernal Crusade	Starbreeze Studios	TDK Mediactive Europe	2004-03-19^{PAL}	Unreleased	Unreleased	March 19, 2004	
Knockout Kings 2003	GameFlow Entertainment; EA Redwood Studios	EA Sports	2002-10-09^{NA}	Unreleased	October 9, 2002	December 20, 2002	
Konjiki no Gash Bell!! Yūjō no Tag Battle Full Power	Bandai	Bandai	2004-08-05^{JP}	August 5, 2004	Unreleased	Unreleased	
Konjiki no Gash Bell!! Go! Go! Mamono Fight!!	Eighting	Bandai	2005-12-15^{JP}	December 15, 2005	Unreleased	Unreleased	
Korokke! Ban-Ō no Kiki o Sukue	Konami	Konami	2004-07-08^{JP}	July 8, 2004	Unreleased	Unreleased	
Kururin Squash!	Eighting	Nintendo	2004-10-14^{JP}	October 14, 2004	Unreleased	Unreleased	
Largo Winch: Empire Under Threat	Dupuis	Ubi Soft	2002-10-01^{PAL}	Unreleased	Unreleased	October 1, 2002	
Legend of Golfer	SETA Corporation	Nintendo	2004-06-17^{JP}	June 17, 2004	Unreleased	Unreleased	
The Legend of Spyro: A New Beginning	Krome Studios	Vivendi Universal Games	2006-10-10^{NA}	Unreleased	October 10, 2006	October 27, 2006	
The Legend of Zelda: Collector's Edition	Nintendo EAD	Nintendo	2003-11-07^{JP}	November 7, 2003	November 17, 2003	November 14, 2003^{EU} March 19, 2004^{AUS}	
The Legend of Zelda: Four Swords Adventures	Nintendo EAD	Nintendo	2004-03-18^{JP}	March 18, 2004	June 7, 2004	January 7, 2005^{EU} April 7, 2005^{AUS}	
The Legend of Zelda: Ocarina of Time / Master Quest	Nintendo EAD	Nintendo	2002-11-28^{JP}	November 28, 2002	February 18, 2003	May 3, 2003	
The Legend of Zelda: Twilight Princess	Nintendo EAD	Nintendo	2006-12-02^{JP}	December 2, 2006	December 11, 2006	December 15, 2006^{EU} December 19, 2006^{AUS}	
The Legend of Zelda: The Wind Waker	Nintendo EAD	Nintendo	2002-12-13^{JP}	December 13, 2002	March 24, 2003	May 2, 2003^{EU} May 7, 2003^{AUS}	
Legends of Wrestling	Acclaim Studios Salt Lake City	Acclaim Entertainment	2002-05-28^{NA}	Unreleased	May 28, 2002	June 7, 2002	
Legends of Wrestling II	Acclaim Studios Salt Lake City	Acclaim Entertainment	2002-11-26^{NA}	Unreleased	November 26, 2002	February 7, 2003	
Lego Star Wars: The Video Game	Traveller's Tales	Eidos Interactive; Giant Interactive Entertainment	2005-10-26^{NA}	Unreleased	October 26, 2005	November 4, 2005	
Lego Star Wars II: The Original Trilogy	Traveller's Tales	LucasArts	2006-09-11^{UK}	Unreleased	September 12, 2006	September 11, 2006^{UK} September 13, 2006^{EU} September 15, 2006^{AUS}	
Lemony Snicket's A Series of Unfortunate Events	Adrenium Games	Activision	2004-11-09^{NA}	Unreleased	November 9, 2004	November 25, 2004	
Looney Tunes: Back in Action	Warthog Games	Electronic Arts; Warner Bros. Interactive Entertainment	2003-11-24^{NA}	Unreleased	November 24, 2003	January 30, 2004	
The Lord of the Rings: The Return of the King	Hypnos Entertainment	EA Games	2003-11-06^{NA}	January 8, 2004	November 6, 2003	November 14, 2003	
The Lord of the Rings: The Third Age	EA Redwood Shores	EA Games	2004-10-29^{AUS}	December 22, 2004	November 2, 2004	October 29, 2004^{AUS} November 12, 2004^{EU}	
The Lord of the Rings: The Two Towers	Hypnos Entertainment	EA Games^{WW} Electronic Arts Square^{JP}	2002-12-30^{NA}	February 14, 2003	December 30, 2002	March 14, 2003	
Lost Kingdoms	FromSoftware	FromSoftware^{JP} Activision^{WW}	2002-04-25^{JP}	April 25, 2002	May 29, 2002	August 9, 2002	
Lost Kingdoms II	FromSoftware	Activision; FromSoftware^{JP}	2003-05-22^{NA}	May 23, 2003	May 22, 2003	June 6, 2003	
Lotus Challenge	Kuju Entertainment	Ignition Entertainment	2004-07-29^{NA}	Unreleased	July 29, 2004	Unreleased	
Luigi's Mansion	Nintendo EAD	Nintendo	2001-09-14^{JP}	September 14, 2001	November 18, 2001	May 3, 2002^{EU} May 17, 2002^{AUS}	
Madagascar	Toys for Bob	Activision^{WW} Bandai^{JP}	2005-05-24^{NA}	August 11, 2005	May 24, 2005	June 30, 2005	
Madden NFL 06	EA Tiburon	EA Sports	2005-08-09^{NA}	Unreleased	August 9, 2005	September 16, 2005	
Madden NFL 07	EA Tiburon	EA Sports	2006-08-22^{NA}	Unreleased	August 22, 2006	Unreleased	
Madden NFL 08	EA Tiburon	EA Sports	2007-08-14^{NA}	Unreleased	August 14, 2007	Unreleased	
Madden NFL 2002	EA Tiburon	EA Sports	2001-11-18^{NA}	Unreleased	November 18, 2001	Unreleased	
Madden NFL 2003	EA Tiburon	EA Sports	2002-08-12^{NA}	Unreleased	August 12, 2002	October 11, 2002	
Madden NFL 2004	EA Tiburon	EA Sports	2003-08-11^{NA}	Unreleased	August 11, 2003	September 5, 2003^{AUS} September 12, 2003^{EU}	
Madden NFL 2005	EA Tiburon	EA Sports	2004-08-10^{NA}	Unreleased	August 10, 2004	September 10, 2004^{AUS} September 17, 2004^{EU}	
Major League Baseball 2K6	Kush Games	2K Sports	2006-06-12^{NA}	Unreleased	June 12, 2006	Unreleased	
Mario Golf: Toadstool Tour	Camelot Software Planning	Nintendo	2003-07-28^{NA}	September 5, 2003	July 28, 2003	February 11, 2004^{AUS} June 18, 2004^{EU}	
Mario Kart: Double Dash	Nintendo EAD	Nintendo	2003-11-07^{JP}	November 7, 2003	November 17, 2003	November 14, 2003	
Mario Party 4	Hudson Soft	Nintendo	2002-10-21^{NA}	November 8, 2002	October 21, 2002	November 29, 2002	
Mario Party 5	Hudson Soft	Nintendo	2003-11-11^{NA}	November 28, 2003	November 11, 2003	December 5, 2003	
Mario Party 6	Hudson Soft	Nintendo	2004-11-18^{JP}	November 18, 2004	December 6, 2004	March 18, 2005^{EU} September 15, 2005^{AUS}	
Mario Party 7	Hudson Soft	Nintendo	2005-11-07^{NA}	November 10, 2005	November 7, 2005	January 27, 2006^{UK} February 10, 2006^{EU} June 8, 2006^{AUS}	
Mario Power Tennis	Camelot Software Planning	Nintendo	2004-10-28^{JP}	October 28, 2004	November 8, 2004	February 25, 2005	
Mario Superstar Baseball	Namco; Now Production; Nintendo SPD	Nintendo	2005-07-21^{JP}	July 21, 2005	August 29, 2005	November 3, 2005^{AUS} November 11, 2005^{EU}	
Mark Davis Pro Bass Challenge	SIMS	Natsume Inc.	2005-09-20^{NA}	Unreleased	September 20, 2005	Unreleased	
Marvel Nemesis: Rise of the Imperfects	Nihilistic Software	Electronic Arts	2005-09-20^{NA}	Unreleased	September 20, 2005	October 11, 2005^{AUS} October 14, 2005^{EU}	
Mary-Kate and Ashley: Sweet 16 – Licensed to Drive	n-Space	Acclaim Entertainment	2002-10^{WW}	Unreleased	October 2002	October 2002	
Mat Hoffman's Pro BMX 2	Gratuitous Games	Activision O2	2002-10-08^{NA}	Unreleased	October 8, 2002	December 6, 2002	
MC Groovz Dance Craze	Mad Catz	Mad Catz	2004-11-22^{NA}	Unreleased	November 22, 2004	June 23, 2005	
Medabots Infinity	Natsume Co., Ltd.	Natsume Co., Ltd.^{JP} Natsume Inc.^{WW}	2003-11-28^{JP}	November 28, 2003	December 14, 2003	September 24, 2004	
Medal of Honor: European Assault	EA Los Angeles	EA Games	2005-06-06^{NA}	August 11, 2005	June 6, 2005	June 17, 2005	
Medal of Honor: Frontline	EA Los Angeles	EA Games	2002-11-07^{NA}	Unreleased	November 7, 2002	December 6, 2002	
Medal of Honor: Rising Sun	EA Los Angeles	EA Games	2003-11-11^{NA}	December 4, 2004	November 11, 2003	November 28, 2003^{EU} December 2, 2003^{AUS}	
Meet the Robinsons	Avalanche Software	Disney Interactive Studios	2007-03-27^{NA}	Unreleased	March 27, 2007	Unreleased	
Mega Man Anniversary Collection	Atomic Planet Entertainment	Capcom	2004-06-22^{NA}	Unreleased	June 22, 2004	Unreleased	
Mega Man Network Transmission	Arika	Capcom	2003-03-06^{JP}	March 6, 2003	June 17, 2003	June 27, 2003	
Mega Man X Collection	Capcom	Capcom	2006-01-10^{NA}	Unreleased	January 10, 2006	Unreleased	
Mega Man X: Command Mission	Capcom Production Studio 3	Capcom	2004-07-29^{JP}	July 29, 2004	September 21, 2004	November 19, 2004	
Men in Black II: Alien Escape	Tantalus Interactive	Infogrames	2003-02-07^{PAL}	Unreleased	April 8, 2003	February 7, 2003	
Metal Arms: Glitch in the System	Swingin' Ape Studios	Vivendi Universal Games	2003-11-18^{NA}	Unreleased	November 18, 2003	December 5, 2003	
Metal Gear Solid: The Twin Snakes	Konami Computer Entertainment Japan; Silicon Knights	Konami	2004-03-09^{NA}	March 11, 2004	March 9, 2004	March 26, 2004	
Metroid Prime	Retro Studios	Nintendo	2002-11-18^{NA}	February 28, 2003	November 18, 2002	March 21, 2003^{EU} April 3, 2003^{AUS}	
Metroid Prime 2: Echoes	Retro Studios	Nintendo	2004-11-15^{NA}	May 26, 2005	November 15, 2004	November 26, 2004^{EU} December 2, 2004^{AUS}	
Micro Machines	Infogrames Sheffield House	Infogrames	2003-01-17^{PAL}	Unreleased	Unreleased	January 17, 2003	
Midway Arcade Treasures	Digital Eclipse	Midway	2003-12-17^{NA}	Unreleased	December 17, 2003	Unreleased	
Midway Arcade Treasures 2	Backbone Entertainment	Midway	2004-10-11^{NA}	Unreleased	October 11, 2004	Unreleased	
Midway Arcade Treasures 3	Backbone Entertainment; Gamestar; Midway Studios San Diego	Midway	2005-10-24^{NA}	Unreleased	October 24, 2005	Unreleased	
Minority Report: Everybody Runs	Treyarch	Activision	2002-11-19^{NA}	Unreleased	November 19, 2002	December 6, 2002	
Mission: Impossible – Operation Surma	Paradigm Entertainment	Atari	2004-03-23^{NA}	March 25, 2004	March 23, 2004	April 2, 2004	
Mr. Driller Drill Land	Namco	Namco	2002-12-20^{JP}	December 20, 2002	Unreleased	Unreleased	
MLB Slugfest 2003	Gratuitous Games	Midway Sports	2002-09-04^{NA}	Unreleased	September 4, 2002	Unreleased	
MLB Slugfest 2004	Gratuitous Games	Midway Sports	2003-03-17^{NA}	Unreleased	March 17, 2003	Unreleased	
Momotarō Dentetsu 11: Black Bombee Shutsugen! No Maki	Hudson Soft	Hudson Soft	2002-12-05^{JP}	December 5, 2002	Unreleased	Unreleased	
Momotarō Dentetsu 12: Nishinihon Hen mo ari Masse!	Hudson Soft	Hudson Soft	2003-12-11^{JP}	December 11, 2003	Unreleased	Unreleased	
Monopoly Party	Runecraft	Infogrames^{WW} Tomy^{JP}	2002-11-20^{NA}	July 31, 2003	November 20, 2002	February 27, 2003	
Monster 4x4: Masters of Metal	Ubi Soft Barcelona; Inland Productions	Ubi Soft	2003-12-10^{NA}	Unreleased	December 10, 2003	Unreleased	
Monster House	Artificial Mind and Movement	THQ	2006-07-18^{NA}	Unreleased	July 18, 2006	August 4, 2006^{EU} September 7, 2006^{AUS}	
Monsters, Inc. Scream Arena	Radical Entertainment	THQ	2002-09-19^{NA}	Unreleased	September 19, 2002	April 11, 2003	
Monster Jam: Maximum Destruction	Inland Productions	Ubi Soft	2002-11-19^{NA}	Unreleased	November 19, 2002	December 6, 2002	
Mortal Kombat: Deadly Alliance	Midway Games	Midway	2002-11-22^{NA}	Unreleased	November 22, 2002	February 14, 2003	
Mortal Kombat: Deception	Midway Games	Midway	2005-02-28^{NA}	Unreleased	February 28, 2005	Unreleased	
Muppets Party Cruise	Mass Media	TDK Mediactive	2003-11-26^{NA}	Unreleased	November 26, 2003	Unreleased	
Muscle Champion: Kinnikujima no Kessen	Konami	Konami	2002-11-21^{JP}	November 21, 2002	Unreleased	Unreleased	
Mutsu to Nohohon	Takara Tomy	Takara Tomy	2002-07-19^{JP}	July 19, 2002	Unreleased	Unreleased	
MVP Baseball 2004	EA Canada	EA Sports	2004-03-09^{NA}	Unreleased	March 9, 2004	Unreleased	
MVP Baseball 2005	EA Canada	EA Sports	2005-02-22^{NA}	Unreleased	February 22, 2005	Unreleased	
MX Superfly	Pacific Coast Power & Light	THQ	2002-06-27^{NA}	Unreleased	June 27, 2002	October 4, 2002	
Mystic Heroes	Koei	Koei	2002-03-29^{JP}	March 29, 2002	September 30, 2002	December 13, 2002	
Namco Museum	Mass Media	Namco Hometek	2002-10-09^{NA}	Unreleased	October 9, 2002	Unreleased	
Namco Museum 50th Anniversary	Backbone Entertainment	Namco Hometek^{NA} Electronic Arts^{PAL}	2005-08-30^{NA}	Unreleased	August 30, 2005	June 9, 2006	
Naruto: Clash of Ninja	Eighting	Tomy	2003-04-11^{JP}	April 11, 2003	March 7, 2006	Unreleased	
Naruto: Clash of Ninja 2 Naruto: Clash of Ninja European Version^{PAL}	Eighting	Tomy^{JP/NA} Nintendo^{PAL}	2003-12-04^{JP}	December 4, 2003	September 26, 2006	November 24, 2006	
Naruto: Gekitō Ninja Taisen! 3	Eighting	Tomy	2004-11-20^{JP}	November 20, 2004	Unreleased	Unreleased	
Naruto: Gekitō Ninja Taisen! 4	Eighting	Tomy	2005-11-21^{JP}	November 21, 2005	Unreleased	Unreleased	
NASCAR 2005: Chase for the Cup	EA Tiburon	EA Sports	2004-08-31^{NA}	Unreleased	August 31, 2004	Unreleased	
NASCAR: Dirt to Daytona	Monster Games	Infogrames	2002-11-12^{NA}	Unreleased	November 12, 2002	Unreleased	
NASCAR Thunder 2003	EA Tiburon	EA Sports	2002-09-18^{NA}	Unreleased	September 18, 2002	Unreleased	
NBA 2K2	Visual Concepts	Sega	2002-03-19^{NA}	Unreleased	March 19, 2002	Unreleased	
NBA 2K3	Visual Concepts	Sega	2002-10-07^{NA}	Unreleased	October 7, 2002	March 28, 2003	
NBA Courtside 2002	Left Field Productions	Nintendo	2002-01-14^{NA}	March 29, 2002	January 14, 2002	May 24, 2002	
NBA Live 06	EA Canada	EA Sports	2005-09-26^{NA}	Unreleased	September 26, 2005	October 7, 2005	
NBA Live 2003	EA Canada	EA Sports	2002-10-08^{NA}	Unreleased	October 8, 2002	November 29, 2002^{AUS} December 6, 2002^{EU}	
NBA Live 2004	EA Canada	EA Sports	2003-10-14^{NA}	Unreleased	October 14, 2003	November 7, 2003	
NBA Live 2005	EA Canada	EA Sports	2004-09-28^{NA}	Unreleased	September 28, 2004	October 29, 2004	
NBA Street	NuFX; EA Canada	EA Sports BIG^{NA} Electronic Arts Square^{JP}	2002-02-05^{NA}	March 22, 2002	February 5, 2002	Unreleased	
NBA Street Vol. 2	NuFX; EA Canada	EA Sports BIG	2003-04-29^{NA}	Unreleased	April 29, 2003	May 2, 2003	
NBA Street V3	EA Canada	EA Sports BIG	2005-02-08^{NA}	May 26, 2005	February 8, 2005	February 18, 2005	
NCAA College Basketball 2K3	Kush Games; Visual Concepts	Sega	2002-12-10^{NA}	Unreleased	December 10, 2002	Unreleased	
NCAA College Football 2K3	Visual Concepts; Avalanche Software	Sega	2002-09-03^{NA}	Unreleased	September 3, 2002	Unreleased	
NCAA Football 2003	EA Tiburon	EA Sports	2002-07-22^{NA}	Unreleased	July 22, 2002	Unreleased	
NCAA Football 2004	EA Tiburon	EA Sports	2003-07-15^{NA}	Unreleased	July 15, 2003	Unreleased	
NCAA Football 2005	EA Tiburon	EA Sports	2004-07-14^{NA}	Unreleased	July 14, 2004	Unreleased	
Need for Speed: Carbon	EA Canada	Electronic Arts	2006-10-31^{NA}	Unreleased	October 31, 2006	November 3, 2006^{EU} November 9, 2006^{AUS}	
Need for Speed: Hot Pursuit 2	EA Seattle	EA Games	2002-10-01^{NA}	Unreleased	October 1, 2002	October 18, 2002^{AUS} October 25, 2002^{EU}	
Need for Speed: Most Wanted	EA Canada; EA Black Box	Electronic Arts	2005-11-15^{NA}	December 22, 2005	November 15, 2005	November 25, 2005^{EU} November 28, 2005^{AUS}	
Need for Speed: Underground	EA Black Box	EA Games	2003-11-17^{NA}	December 25, 2003	November 17, 2003	November 20, 2003^{AUS} November 21, 2003^{EU}	
Need for Speed: Underground 2	EA Black Box	EA Games	2004-11-15^{NA}	December 22, 2004	November 15, 2004	November 16, 2004^{AUS} November 19, 2004^{EU}	
Neighbours from Hell	JoWooD Vienna	JoWooD Productions	2005-03-04^{PAL}	Unreleased	Unreleased	March 4, 2005	
NFL 2K3	Visual Concepts	Sega	2002-08-20^{NA}	Unreleased	August 20, 2002	March 28, 2003	
NFL Blitz 2002	Point of View	Midway	2002-03-18^{NA}	Unreleased	March 18, 2002	Unreleased	
NFL Blitz 2003	Point of View	Midway Sports	2002-08-12^{NA}	Unreleased	August 12, 2002	Unreleased	
NFL Blitz Pro	Midway Games	Midway Sports	2003-12-02^{NA}	Unreleased	December 2, 2003	Unreleased	
NFL QB Club 2002	Acclaim Studios Austin	Acclaim Sports	2001-12-20^{NA}	Unreleased	December 20, 2001	Unreleased	
NFL Street	EA Tiburon	EA Sports BIG	2004-01-13^{NA}	Unreleased	January 13, 2004	January 30, 2004	
NFL Street 2	EA Tiburon	EA Sports BIG	2004-12-26^{NA}	Unreleased	December 26, 2004	January 28, 2005	
NHL 06	EA Canada	EA Sports	2005-09-06^{NA}	Unreleased	September 6, 2005	September 23, 2005	
NHL 2003	EA Canada	EA Sports	2002-10-03^{NA}	Unreleased	October 3, 2002	October 21, 2002^{AUS} October 25, 2002^{EU}	
NHL 2004	EA Black Box	EA Sports	2003-09-23^{NA}	Unreleased	September 23, 2003	October 3, 2003^{EU} October 10, 2003^{AUS}	
NHL 2005	EA Black Box	EA Sports	2004-09-17^{AUS}	Unreleased	September 22, 2004	September 17, 2004^{AUS} October 8, 2004^{EU}	
NHL 2K3	Treyarch	Sega	2002-12-10^{NA}	Unreleased	December 10, 2002	March 28, 2003	
NHL Hitz 2002	Black Box Games	Midway	2001-11-18^{NA}	Unreleased	November 18, 2001	May 10, 2002^{EU} May 17, 2002^{AUS}	
NHL Hitz 2003	Black Box Games	Midway Sports	2002-09-16^{NA}	Unreleased	September 16, 2002	November 1, 2002	
NHL Hitz Pro	Next Level Games	Midway Sports	2003-09-25^{NA}	Unreleased	September 25, 2003	Unreleased	
Nickelodeon Party Blast	Data Design Interactive	Infogrames	2002-11-20^{NA}	Unreleased	November 20, 2002	December 6, 2002	
Nicktoons: Battle for Volcano Island	Blue Tongue Entertainment	THQ	2006-10-24^{NA}	Unreleased	October 24, 2006	Unreleased	
Nicktoons Unite! SpongeBob SquarePants & Friends: Unite!^{PAL}	Blue Tongue Entertainment	THQ	2005-10-26^{NA}	Unreleased	October 26, 2005	March 3, 2006	
Nintendo Puzzle Collection	Nintendo Software Technology; Intelligent Systems	Nintendo	2003-02-07^{JP}	February 7, 2003	Unreleased	Unreleased	
Odama	Vivarium	Nintendo	2006-03-31^{PAL}	April 13, 2006	April 10, 2006	March 31, 2006	
Ohenro-San	Panasonic Corporation	Panasonic Corporation	2003-04-24^{JP}	April 24, 2003	Unreleased	Unreleased	
One Piece: Grand Adventure	Ganbarion	Namco Bandai Games	2006-08-30^{NA}	Unreleased	August 30, 2006	Unreleased	
One Piece: Grand Battle! One Piece: Grand Battle! Rush^{JP}	Ganbarion	Bandai	2005-03-17^{JP}	March 17, 2005	September 7, 2005	Unreleased	
One Piece: Pirates' Carnival	h.a.n.d.	Bandai^{JP} Namco Bandai Games^{NA}	2005-11-23^{JP}	November 23, 2005	September 12, 2006	Unreleased	
Open Season	Ubisoft Montreal; Ubisoft Quebec	Ubisoft	2006-09-18^{NA}	Unreleased	September 18, 2006	October 6, 2006^{EU} November 30, 2006^{AUS}	
Outlaw Golf	Hypnotix	Simon & Schuster Interactive^{NA} TDK Mediactive Europe^{PAL}	2002-10-30^{NA}	Unreleased	October 30, 2002	June 24, 2003	
Over the Hedge	Edge of Reality	Activision	2006-05-09^{NA}	Unreleased	May 9, 2006	June 8, 2006^{EU} June 14, 2006^{AUS}	
P.N.03	Capcom Production Studio 4	Capcom	2003-03-27^{JP}	March 27, 2003	September 9, 2003	August 29, 2003^{EU} September 5, 2003^{AUS}	
Pac-Man Fever	Mass Media	Namco Hometek	2002-09-03^{NA}	Unreleased	September 3, 2002	Unreleased	
Pac-Man Vs.	Nintendo EAD	Namco^{JP} Namco Hometek^{NA} Electronic Arts^{PAL}	2003-11-27^{JP}	November 27, 2003	December 2, 2003	April 2, 2004	
Pac-Man World 2	Namco	Namco Hometek^{NA} Electronic Arts^{PAL}	2002-03-12^{NA}	Unreleased	March 12, 2002	May 3, 2002	
Pac-Man World 3	Blitz Games	Namco Hometek^{NA} Electronic Arts^{PAL}	2005-11-15^{NA}	Unreleased	November 15, 2005	June 23, 2006	
Pac-Man World Rally	Smart Bomb Interactive	Namco Bandai Games	2006-08-22^{NA}	Unreleased	August 22, 2006	Unreleased	
Paper Mario: The Thousand-Year Door	Intelligent Systems	Nintendo	2004-07-22^{JP}	July 22, 2004	October 11, 2004	November 12, 2004^{EU} November 18, 2004^{AUS}	
Peter Jackson's King Kong	Ubisoft Montpellier	Ubisoft	2005-11-17^{PAL}	Unreleased	November 22, 2005	November 17, 2005	
Phantasy Star Online Episode I & II	Sonic Team	Sega	2002-09-12^{JP}	September 12, 2002	October 30, 2002	March 7, 2003	
Phantasy Star Online Episode I & II Plus	Sonic Team	Sega	2003-11-27^{JP}	November 27, 2003	September 15, 2004	Unreleased	
Phantasy Star Online Episode III: C.A.R.D. Revolution	Sonic Team	Sega	2003-11-27^{JP}	November 27, 2003	March 2, 2004	June 11, 2004	
Piglet's Big Game	Doki Denki Studio	Gotham Games	2003-03-21^{NA}	Unreleased	March 21, 2003	July 2, 2003	
Pikmin	Nintendo EAD	Nintendo	2001-10-26^{JP}	October 26, 2001	December 3, 2001	June 14, 2002	
Pikmin 2	Nintendo EAD	Nintendo	2004-04-29^{JP}	April 29, 2004	August 30, 2004	October 8, 2004^{EU} November 4, 2004^{AUS}	
PK: Out of the Shadows; Donald Duck: PK^{PAL}	Ubi Soft Montreal	Ubi Soft	2002-11-29^{PAL}	December 5, 2002	December 3, 2002	November 29, 2002	
Pinball Hall of Fame: The Gottlieb Collection	FarSight Studios	Crave Entertainment	2005-03-20^{NA}	Unreleased	March 20, 2005	Unreleased	
Pitfall: The Lost Expedition	Edge of Reality	Activision	2004-02-17^{NA}	Unreleased	February 17, 2004	February 20, 2004^{EU} February 23, 2004^{AUS}	
Pokémon Box: Ruby and Sapphire	Nintendo EAD; Game Freak	The Pokémon Company^{JP} Nintendo^{WW}	2003-05-30^{JP}	May 30, 2003	July 11, 2004	May 14, 2004^{EU} July 16, 2004^{AUS}	
Pokémon Channel	Ambrella	The Pokémon Company^{JP} Nintendo^{WW}	2003-07-18^{JP}	July 18, 2003	December 1, 2003	April 2, 2004	
Pokémon Colosseum	Genius Sonority	The Pokémon Company^{JP} Nintendo^{WW}	2003-11-21^{JP}	November 21, 2003	March 22, 2004	May 14, 2004	
Pokémon XD: Gale of Darkness	Genius Sonority	The Pokémon Company^{JP} Nintendo^{WW}	2005-08-04^{JP}	August 4, 2005	October 3, 2005	November 10, 2005^{AUS} November 18, 2005^{EU}	
The Polar Express	Blue Tongue Entertainment	THQ	2004-11-02^{NA}	Unreleased	November 2, 2004	November 26, 2004^{AUS} December 16, 2004^{EU}	
Pool Edge	NDcube	Media Kite	2002-10-25^{JP}	October 25, 2002	Unreleased	Unreleased	
Pool Paradise	Awesome Studios	Ignition Entertainment	2004-05-07^{PAL}	Unreleased	June 28, 2004	May 7, 2004	
Power Rangers Dino Thunder	Pacific Coast Power & Light	THQ	2004-09-22^{NA}	Unreleased	September 22, 2004	November 26, 2004^{EU} January 14, 2005^{AUS}	
The Powerpuff Girls: Relish Rampage - Pickled Edition	VIS Entertainment	BAM! Entertainment	2002-12-15^{NA}	Unreleased	December 15, 2002	February 6, 2004	
Prince of Persia: The Sands of Time	Ubisoft Montreal	Ubisoft	2003-11-18^{NA}	Unreleased	November 18, 2003	February 20, 2004	
Prince of Persia: The Two Thrones	Ubisoft Montreal; Ubisoft Casablanca	Ubisoft	2005-12-01^{NA}	Unreleased	December 1, 2005	December 9, 2005	
Prince of Persia: Warrior Within	Ubisoft Montreal	Ubisoft	2004-12-02^{NA}	Unreleased	December 2, 2004	December 3, 2004	
Pro Rally	Ubi Soft Barcelona	Ubi Soft	2002-10-04^{PAL}	Unreleased	November 11, 2002	October 4, 2002	
Puyo Pop Fever	Sonic Team	Sega	2004-02-27^{PAL}	March 24, 2004	July 20, 2004	February 27, 2004	
R: Racing Evolution; R: Racing^{PAL}	Namco	Namco^{JP} Namco Hometek^{NA} Electronic Arts^{PAL}	2003-11-27^{JP}	November 27, 2003	December 9, 2003	March 26, 2004	
Radirgy GeneriC	MileStone	MileStone	2006-05-25^{JP}	May 25, 2006	Unreleased	Unreleased	
Rally Championship	Warthog Games	SCi Games^{PAL} Conspiracy Entertainment^{NA}	2003-02-07^{PAL}	Unreleased	July 30, 2003	February 7, 2003	
Rampage: Total Destruction	Pipeworks Software	Midway	2006-04-24^{NA}	Unreleased	April 24, 2006	Unreleased	
Ratatouille	Asobo Studio	THQ	2007-06-26^{NA}	Unreleased	June 26, 2007	August 3, 2007	
Rave Master	Konami	Konami	2002-03-20^{JP}	March 20, 2002	March 8, 2005	Unreleased	
Rayman 3: Hoodlum Havoc	Ubi Pictures	Ubi Soft	2003-02-21^{PAL}	October 22, 2004	March 4, 2003	February 21, 2003	
Rayman Arena	Ubi Pictures; Ubi Soft Milan	Ubi Soft	2002-10-01^{NA}	Unreleased	October 1, 2002	Unreleased	
Red Faction II	Cranky Pants Games	THQ	2003-04-01^{NA}	Unreleased	April 1, 2003	June 6, 2003^{EU} June 13, 2003^{AUS}	
RedCard 2003; RedCard^{PAL}	Point of View	Midway Sports	2002-06-25^{NA}	Unreleased	June 25, 2002	July 5, 2002	
Rei Fighter Gekitsui Senki	Global A Entertainment	Global A Entertainment	2003-03-06^{JP}	March 6, 2003	Unreleased	Unreleased	
Reign of Fire	Kuju London	BAM! Entertainment	2002-11-26^{NA}	Unreleased	November 26, 2002	November 29, 2002	
Resident Evil	Capcom Production Studio 4	Capcom	2002-03-22^{JP}	March 22, 2002	April 30, 2002	September 13, 2002^{EU} September 20, 2002^{AUS}	
Resident Evil 2	Capcom	Capcom	2003-01-14^{NA}	January 23, 2003	January 14, 2003	May 30, 2003	
Resident Evil 3: Nemesis	Capcom	Capcom	2003-01-15^{NA}	January 23, 2003	January 15, 2003	May 30, 2003	
Resident Evil 4	Capcom Production Studio 4	Capcom	2005-01-11^{NA}	January 27, 2005	January 11, 2005	March 18, 2005	
Resident Evil – Code: Veronica X	Capcom Production Studio 4	Capcom	2003-08-07^{JP}	August 7, 2003	December 3, 2003	March 12, 2004	
Resident Evil Zero	Capcom Production Studio 3; Tose	Capcom	2002-11-12^{NA}	November 21, 2002	November 12, 2002	February 28, 2003^{AUS} March 7, 2003^{EU}	
Ribbit King	Infinity; Jamsworks	Bandai	2003-07-11^{JP}	July 11, 2003	June 8, 2004	September 3, 2004	
Road Trip: The Arcade Edition; Gadget Racers^{PAL} Choro Q!^{JP}	Hudson Soft	Takara^{JP} Zoo Digital Publishing^{PAL} Conspiracy Entertainment^{NA}	2002-12-19^{JP}	December 19, 2002	March 16, 2004	December 5, 2003	
RoadKill	Terminal Reality	Midway	2003-10-30^{NA}	Unreleased	October 30, 2003	Unreleased	
RoboCop: Aratanaru Kiki	Titus Interactive Studio	Titus Japan K.K.	2004-03-04^{JP}	March 4, 2004	Unreleased	Unreleased	
Robotech: Battlecry	Vicious Cycle Software	TDK Mediactive	2002-10-16^{NA}	Unreleased	October 16, 2002	March 21, 2003	
Robots	Eurocom	Vivendi Universal Games	2005-02-22^{NA}	July 28, 2005	February 22, 2005	March 11, 2005	
Rocket Power: Beach Bandits	Evolution Games	THQ	2002-09-24^{NA}	Unreleased	September 24, 2002	October 25, 2002	
Rocky	Steel Monkeys	Ubi Soft^{NA} Rage Software^{PAL}	2002-11-14^{NA}	Unreleased	November 14, 2002	November 22, 2002	
Rogue Ops	Bits Studios	Kemco	2003-10-28^{NA}	February 26, 2004	October 28, 2003	February 6, 2004	
Rugrats: Royal Ransom	Avalanche Software	THQ	2002-11-26^{NA}	Unreleased	November 26, 2002	April 11, 2003	
Rupan Sansei: Umi ni Kieta Hihou	Asmik Ace Entertainment	Asmik Ace Entertainment	2003-07-31^{JP}	July 31, 2003	Unreleased	Unreleased	
Samurai Jack: The Shadow of Aku	Adrenium Games	Sega	2004-03-23^{NA}	Unreleased	March 23, 2004	June 25, 2004	
Scaler	Artificial Mind and Movement	Global Star Software	2004-11-17^{NA}	Unreleased	November 17, 2004	Unreleased	
Scooby-Doo! Mystery Mayhem	Artificial Mind and Movement	THQ	2004-03-02^{NA}	Unreleased	March 2, 2004	March 26, 2004	
Scooby-Doo! Night of 100 Frights	Heavy Iron Studios	THQ	2002-09-12^{NA}	Unreleased	September 12, 2002	November 22, 2002	
Scooby-Doo! Unmasked	Artificial Mind and Movement	THQ	2005-09-12^{NA}	Unreleased	September 12, 2005	September 23, 2005	
The Scorpion King: Rise of the Akkadian	Point of View	Universal Interactive	2002-09-10^{NA}	Unreleased	September 10, 2002	December 5, 2002	
SD Gundam Gashapon Wars	Bandai Entertainment	Bandai	2005-12-01^{JP}	December 1, 2005	Unreleased	Unreleased	
Second Sight	Free Radical Design	Codemasters	2004-09-03^{PAL}	Unreleased	September 21, 2004	September 3, 2004	
Sega Soccer Slam	Black Box Games	Sega	2002-03-19^{NA}	September 26, 2002	March 19, 2002	October 18, 2002	
Serious Sam: Next Encounter	Climax Solent	Global Star Software	2004-04-14^{NA}	Unreleased	April 14, 2004	April 30, 2004	
Shadow the Hedgehog	Sega Studios USA	Sega	2005-11-15^{NA}	December 15, 2005	November 15, 2005	November 18, 2005	
Shaman King: Soul Fight	Tuning Electronic	Bandai	2003-03-28^{JP}	March 28, 2003	Unreleased	Unreleased	
Shamu's Deep Sea Adventures	Fun Labs	Activision	2005-11-01^{NA}	Unreleased	November 1, 2005	March 16, 2006	
Shark Tale	Edge of Reality	Activision^{WW} Taito^{JP}	2004-09-21^{AUS}	March 3, 2005	September 29, 2004	September 21, 2004^{AUS} October 1, 2004^{EU}	
Shikigami no Shiro II	Alfa System	Kids Station	2003-10-24^{JP}	October 24, 2003	Unreleased	Unreleased	
Shinseiki GPX Cyber Formula: Road to the Evolution	Atelier-Sai	Sunrise Interactive	2004-07-29^{JP}	July 29, 2004	Unreleased	Unreleased	
Shrek 2	Luxoflux	Activision	2004-05-04^{NA}	Unreleased	May 4, 2004	June 18, 2004	
Shrek: Extra Large	Digital Illusions Canada	TDK Mediactive	2002-10-30^{NA}	Unreleased	October 30, 2002	October 24, 2003	
Shrek Smash n' Crash Racing	Torus Games	Activision	2006-11-21^{NA}	Unreleased	November 21, 2006	March 16, 2007	
Shrek Super Party	Mass Media	TDK Mediactive	2003-05-30^{PAL}	Unreleased	June 5, 2003	May 30, 2003	
Shrek SuperSlam	Shaba Games	Activision	2005-10-25^{NA}	Unreleased	October 25, 2005	November 18, 2005	
The Simpsons: Hit & Run	Radical Entertainment	Vivendi Universal Games	2003-09-16^{NA}	Unreleased	September 16, 2003	October 31, 2003	
The Simpsons: Road Rage	Radical Entertainment	Electronic Arts; Fox Interactive	2001-12-19^{NA}	Unreleased	December 19, 2001	May 17, 2002	
The Sims	Edge of Reality	EA Games	2003-03-25^{NA}	January 22, 2004	March 25, 2003	April 4, 2003	
The Sims 2	Maxis	Electronic Arts	2005-10-25^{NA}	Unreleased	October 25, 2005	November 4, 2005^{EU} November 7, 2005^{AUS}	
The Sims 2: Pets	Maxis	Electronic Arts	2006-10-17^{NA}	Unreleased	October 17, 2006	October 20, 2006^{EU} October 26, 2006^{AUS}	
The Sims Bustin' Out	Maxis	EA Games	2003-12-16^{NA}	Unreleased	December 16, 2003	December 19, 2003^{EU} January 27, 2004^{AUS}	
Skies of Arcadia Legends	Overworks	Sega	2002-12-26^{JP}	December 26, 2002	January 28, 2003	May 23, 2003^{EU} June 6, 2003^{AUS}	
Smashing Drive	Point of View	Namco Hometek	2002-02-18^{NA}	Unreleased	February 18, 2002	Unreleased	
Smuggler's Run: Warzones	Angel Studios	Rockstar Games	2002-08-06^{NA}	Unreleased	August 6, 2002	October 18, 2002	
Sonic Adventure 2: Battle	Sonic Team USA	Sega	2001-12-20^{JP}	December 20, 2001	February 12, 2002	May 3, 2002^{EU} May 17, 2002^{AUS}	
Sonic Adventure DX: Director's Cut	Sonic Team	Sega	2003-06-17^{NA}	June 19, 2003	June 17, 2003	June 20, 2003^{AUS} June 27, 2003^{EU}	
Sonic Gems Collection	Sonic Team	Sega	2005-08-11^{JP}	August 11, 2005	August 16, 2005	September 30, 2005^{EU} October 7, 2005^{AUS}	
Sonic Heroes	Sonic Team USA	Sega	2003-12-30^{JP}	December 30, 2003	January 6, 2004	February 2, 2004	
Sonic Mega Collection	Sonic Team	Sega	2002-11-12^{NA}	December 19, 2002	November 12, 2002	March 7, 2003	
Sonic Riders	Sonic Team; Now Production	Sega	2006-02-21^{NA}	February 23, 2006	February 21, 2006	March 17, 2006^{EU} March 23, 2006^{AUS}	
Soulcalibur II	Project Soul	Namco^{JP} Namco Hometek^{NA} Nintendo^{PAL}	2003-03-27^{JP}	March 27, 2003	August 26, 2003	September 26, 2003	
Space Raiders	Taito	Taito^{JP} Mastiff^{NA}	2003-01-09^{JP}	January 9, 2003	April 19, 2004	Unreleased	
Spartan: Total Warrior	Creative Assembly	Sega	2005-10-07^{EU}	Unreleased	October 25, 2005	October 7, 2005^{EU} October 14, 2005^{AUS}	
Spawn: Armageddon	Point of View	Namco Hometek^{NA} Electronic Arts^{PAL}	2003-11-21^{NA}	Unreleased	November 21, 2003	March 12, 2004	
Special Jinsei Game	Takara	Takara	2003-05-01^{JP}	May 1, 2003	Unreleased	Unreleased	
Speed Challenge: Jacques Villeneuve's Racing Vision	Ubi Soft	Ubi Soft	2002-10-18^{PAL}	Unreleased	Unreleased	October 18, 2002	
Speed Kings	Climax London	Acclaim Entertainment	2003-05-28^{NA}	Unreleased	May 28, 2003	July 4, 2003	
Sphinx and the Cursed Mummy	Eurocom	THQ	2003-11-10^{NA}	Unreleased	November 10, 2003	February 20, 2004	
Spider-Man	Treyarch	Activision^{WW} Capcom^{JP}	2002-04-16^{NA}	February 13, 2003	April 16, 2002	June 7, 2002	
Spider-Man 2	Treyarch	Activision	2004-06-29^{NA}	Unreleased	June 29, 2004	July 2, 2004^{AUS} July 9, 2004^{EU}	
SpongeBob SquarePants: Battle for Bikini Bottom	Heavy Iron Studios	THQ	2003-10-29^{NA}	Unreleased	October 29, 2003	November 28, 2003	
SpongeBob SquarePants: Creature from the Krusty Krab	Blitz Games	THQ	2006-10-16^{NA}	Unreleased	October 18, 2006	November 2, 2006^{AUS} November 10, 2006^{EU}	
SpongeBob SquarePants: Lights, Camera, Pants!	THQ Studio Australia	THQ	2005-10-19^{NA}	Unreleased	October 19, 2005	November 18, 2005	
The SpongeBob SquarePants Movie	Heavy Iron Studios	THQ	2004-10-27^{NA}	Unreleased	October 27, 2004	November 26, 2004^{AUS} February 18, 2005^{EU}	
SpongeBob SquarePants: Revenge of the Flying Dutchman	Big Sky Interactive	THQ	2002-12-17^{NA}	Unreleased	December 17, 2002	March 28, 2003	
SpyHunter	Point of View	Midway	2002-03-12^{NA}	Unreleased	March 12, 2002	June 28, 2002	
Spyro: Enter the Dragonfly	Equinoxe Digital Entertainment; Check Six Studios	Universal Interactive	2002-11-19^{NA}	Unreleased	November 19, 2002	November 29, 2002	
Spyro: A Hero's Tail	Eurocom	Vivendi Universal Games	2004-11-02^{NA}	Unreleased	November 2, 2004	November 26, 2004	
SSX 3	EA Canada	EA Sports BIG	2003-10-21^{NA}	December 18, 2003	October 21, 2003	October 31, 2003	
SSX on Tour	EA Canada	EA Sports BIG	2005-10-11^{NA}	November 24, 2005	October 11, 2005	October 21, 2005	
SSX Tricky	EA Canada	EA Sports BIG^{WW} Electronic Arts Square^{JP}	2001-11-27^{NA}	December 27, 2001	November 27, 2001	July 12, 2002	
Star Fox Adventures	Rare	Nintendo	2002-09-23^{NA}	September 27, 2002	September 23, 2002	November 15, 2002^{AUS} November 22, 2002^{EU}	
Star Fox: Assault	Namco	Nintendo	2005-02-15^{NA}	February 24, 2005	February 15, 2005	April 29, 2005^{EU} June 16, 2005^{AUS}	
Starsky & Hutch	Supersonic Software	Empire Interactive	2003-09-26^{PAL}	Unreleased	August 31, 2004	September 26, 2003	
Star Wars: Bounty Hunter	LucasArts	LucasArts	2002-12-07^{NA}	Unreleased	December 7, 2002	February 7, 2003	
Star Wars: The Clone Wars	Pandemic Studios	LucasArts	2002-10-29^{NA}	March 20, 2003	October 29, 2002	November 15, 2002	
Star Wars Jedi Knight II: Jedi Outcast	Vicarious Visions	LucasArts^{NA} Activision^{PAL}	2002-11-19^{NA}	Unreleased	November 19, 2002	November 22, 2002	
Star Wars Rogue Squadron II: Rogue Leader	Factor 5; LucasArts	LucasArts	2001-11-18^{NA}	March 22, 2002	November 18, 2001	May 3, 2002^{EU} May 17, 2002^{AUS}	
Star Wars Rogue Squadron III: Rebel Strike	Factor 5	LucasArts	2003-10-21^{NA}	November 21, 2003	October 21, 2003	November 7, 2003	
Street Hoops	Black Ops Entertainment	Activision	2002-11-26^{NA}	Unreleased	November 26, 2002	Unreleased	
Street Racing Syndicate	Eutechnyx	Namco Hometek^{NA} Nintendo^{PAL}	2004-08-31^{NA}	Unreleased	August 31, 2004	March 4, 2005^{EU} March 24, 2005^{AUS}	
Strike Force Bowling	LAB Rats Games	Crave Entertainment	2005-05-06^{NA}	Unreleased	May 6, 2005	Unreleased	
The Sum of All Fears	Red Storm Entertainment	Ubi Soft	2002-12-17^{NA}	Unreleased	December 17, 2002	March 21, 2003	
Summoner: A Goddess Reborn	Volition	THQ	2003-02-04^{NA}	Unreleased	February 4, 2003	April 11, 2003	
Super Bubble Pop	Runecraft	Jaleco	2003-01-03^{NA}	Unreleased	January 3, 2003	Unreleased	
Super Mario Strikers; Mario Smash Football^{PAL}	Next Level Games	Nintendo	2005-11-18^{EU}	January 11, 2006	December 5, 2005	November 18, 2005^{EU} April 6, 2006^{AUS}	
Super Mario Sunshine	Nintendo EAD	Nintendo	2002-07-19^{JP}	July 19, 2002	August 26, 2002	October 4, 2002^{EU} October 11, 2002^{AUS}	
Super Monkey Ball	Amusement Vision	Sega	2001-09-14^{JP}	September 14, 2001	November 18, 2001	May 3, 2002^{EU} May 17, 2002^{AUS}	
Super Monkey Ball 2	Amusement Vision	Sega	2002-08-26^{NA}	November 21, 2002	August 26, 2002	March 14, 2003^{EU} March 16, 2003^{AUS}	
Super Monkey Ball Adventure	Traveller's Tales	Sega	2006-07-14^{EU}	Unreleased	August 1, 2006	July 14, 2006^{EU} August 15, 2006^{AUS}	
Super Robot Taisen GC	Banpresto	Banpresto	2004-12-16^{JP}	December 16, 2004	Unreleased	Unreleased	
Super Smash Bros. Melee	HAL Laboratory	Nintendo	2001-11-21^{JP}	November 21, 2001	December 3, 2001	May 24, 2002^{EU} May 31, 2002^{AUS}	
Superman: Shadow of Apokolips	Infogrames Sheffield House	Infogrames	2003-03-26^{NA}	Unreleased	March 26, 2003	May 2, 2003	
Surf's Up	Ubisoft Montreal	Ubisoft	2007-05-29^{NA}	Unreleased	May 29, 2007	Unreleased	
Swingerz Golf; Ace Golf^{PAL}	Telenet Japan	Eidos Interactive	2002-10-23^{NA}	November 28, 2002	October 23, 2002	December 6, 2002	
SX Superstar	Climax Solent	AKA Acclaim	2003-06-30^{NA}	Unreleased	June 30, 2003	July 4, 2003	
Tak and the Power of Juju	Avalanche Software	THQ	2003-10-15^{NA}	Unreleased	October 15, 2003	March 12, 2004	
Tak: The Great Juju Challenge	Avalanche Software	THQ	2005-09-19^{WW}	Unreleased	September 19, 2005	September 19, 2005	
Tak 2: The Staff of Dreams	Avalanche Software	THQ	2004-10-11^{NA}	Unreleased	October 11, 2004	March 11, 2005^{AUS} March 24, 2005^{EU}	
Tales of Symphonia	Namco Tales Studio	Namco^{JP} Namco Hometek^{NA} Nintendo^{PAL}	2003-08-29^{JP}	August 29, 2003	July 13, 2004	November 18, 2004^{AUS} November 19, 2004^{EU}	
Tarzan: Untamed; Tarzan: Freeride^{PAL}	Ubi Soft Montreal	Ubi Soft	2001-11-18^{NA}	Unreleased	November 18, 2001	May 3, 2002^{EU} May 17, 2002^{AUS}	
Taxi 3	Ubi Soft Montreal	Ubi Soft	2003-08-28^{PAL}	Unreleased	Unreleased	August 28, 2003	
Taz: Wanted	Blitz Games	Infogrames	2002-10-04^{EU}	Unreleased	October 8, 2002	October 4, 2002^{EU} October 18, 2002^{AUS}	
Teenage Mutant Ninja Turtles	Konami Computer Entertainment Studios	Konami	2003-10-21^{NA}	Unreleased	October 21, 2003	April 30, 2004	
Teenage Mutant Ninja Turtles 2: Battle Nexus	Konami Computer Entertainment Studios	Konami	2004-10-19^{NA}	Unreleased	October 19, 2004	March 11, 2005	
Teenage Mutant Ninja Turtles 3: Mutant Nightmare	Konami Computer Entertainment Studios	Konami	2005-11-01^{NA}	Unreleased	November 1, 2005	Unreleased	
Tengai Makyō II: Manji Maru	Hudson Soft	Hudson Soft	2005-09-25^{JP}	September 25, 2005	Unreleased	Unreleased	
Teen Titans	Artificial Mind and Movement	THQ; Majesco	2006-05-24^{NA}	Unreleased	May 24, 2006	October 11, 2006	
Tensai Bit-Kun: Gramon Battle	Taito	Taito	2003-10-03^{JP}	October 3, 2003	Unreleased	Unreleased	
Terminator 3: The Redemption	Paradigm Entertainment	Atari	2004-09-09^{NA}	January 20, 2005	September 9, 2004	September 17, 2004^{AUS} September 24, 2004^{EU}	
Tetris Worlds	Radical Entertainment	THQ^{WW} Success^{JP}	2002-06-26^{NA}	December 20, 2002	June 26, 2002	September 27, 2002	
Tiger Woods PGA Tour 06	EA Redwood Shores; Hypnos Entertainment	EA Sports	2005-09-22^{NA}	Unreleased	September 22, 2005	October 7, 2005^{EU} October 10, 2005^{AUS}	
Tiger Woods PGA Tour 2003	EA Redwood Shores	EA Sports	2002-10-29^{NA}	Unreleased	October 29, 2002	December 6, 2002	
Tiger Woods PGA Tour 2004	EA Redwood Shores	EA Sports	2003-09-22^{NA}	Unreleased	September 22, 2003	September 25, 2003^{AUS} September 26, 2003^{EU}	
Tiger Woods PGA Tour 2005	EA Redwood Shores	EA Sports	2004-09-17^{AUS}	Unreleased	September 21, 2004	September 17, 2004^{AUS} September 24, 2004^{EU}	
TimeSplitters 2	Free Radical Design	Eidos Interactive	2002-10-15^{NA}	Unreleased	October 15, 2002	November 1, 2002^{EU} November 4, 2002^{AUS}	
TimeSplitters: Future Perfect	Free Radical Design	EA Games	2005-03-21^{NA}	Unreleased	March 22, 2005	March 24, 2005	
TMNT	Ubisoft Montreal	Ubisoft	2007-03-20^{NA}	Unreleased	March 20, 2007	March 23, 2007	
TMNT: Mutant Melee	Konami Computer Entertainment Hawaii	Konami	2005-03-15^{NA}	Unreleased	March 15, 2005	Unreleased	
Tom and Jerry: War of the Whiskers	VIS Entertainment	NewKidCo	2003-01-04^{NA}	Unreleased	January 4, 2003	Unreleased	
Tom Clancy's Ghost Recon	Red Storm Entertainment	Ubi Soft	2003-02-11^{NA}	Unreleased	February 11, 2003	March 20, 2003	
Tom Clancy's Ghost Recon 2	Red Storm Entertainment	Ubisoft	2005-03-15^{NA}	Unreleased	March 15, 2005	March 24, 2005	
Tom Clancy's Rainbow Six 3	Ubisoft Shanghai	Ubisoft	2004-06-15^{NA}	Unreleased	June 15, 2004	June 25, 2004	
Tom Clancy's Rainbow Six: Lockdown	Red Storm Entertainment	Ubisoft	2005-09-27^{NA}	Unreleased	September 27, 2005	September 29, 2005^{PAL} September 30, 2005^{UK}	
Tom Clancy's Splinter Cell	Ubi Soft Shanghai	Ubi Soft	2003-04-08^{NA}	Unreleased	April 8, 2003	June 6, 2003	
Tom Clancy's Splinter Cell: Chaos Theory	Ubisoft Montreal; Ubisoft Milan	Ubisoft	2005-03-30^{NA}	Unreleased	March 30, 2005	April 1, 2005	
Tom Clancy's Splinter Cell: Double Agent	Ubisoft Montreal	Ubisoft	2006-10-24^{NA}	Unreleased	October 24, 2006	October 26, 2006^{AUS} October 27, 2006^{EU}	
Tom Clancy's Splinter Cell: Pandora Tomorrow	Ubisoft Milan; Ubisoft Shanghai	Ubisoft	2004-07-15^{NA}	Unreleased	July 15, 2004	July 30, 2004	
Tomb Raider: Legend	Nixxes Software	Eidos Interactive	2006-11-14^{NA}	Unreleased	November 14, 2006	December 1, 2006	
Tonka: Rescue Patrol	Lucky Chicken Games	TDK Mediactive	2003-11-18^{NA}	Unreleased	November 18, 2003	Unreleased	
Tony Hawk's American Wasteland	Neversoft	Activision	2005-10-18^{NA}	Unreleased	October 18, 2005	October 28, 2005	
Tony Hawk's Pro Skater 3	Neversoft	Activision O2^{WW} Success^{JP}	2001-11-18^{NA}	June 27, 2003	November 18, 2001	May 3, 2002^{EU} May 17, 2002^{AUS}	
Tony Hawk's Pro Skater 4	Neversoft	Activision O2	2002-10-23^{NA}	Unreleased	October 23, 2002	November 15, 2002	
Tony Hawk's Underground	Neversoft	Activision	2003-10-27^{NA}	Unreleased	October 27, 2003	November 21, 2003	
Tony Hawk's Underground 2	Neversoft	Activision	2004-10-04^{NA}	Unreleased	October 4, 2004	October 8, 2004	
Top Angler: Real Bass Fishing	SIMS	Xicat Interactive	2003-01-01^{NA}	Unreleased	January 1, 2003	July 18, 2003	
Top Gun: Combat Zones	Digital Integration	Titus Interactive	2002-10-28^{NA}	December 26, 2002	October 28, 2002	November 8, 2002	
The Tower of Druaga	Namco	Namco	2003-12-05^{JP}	December 5, 2003	Unreleased	Unreleased	
TransWorld Surf: Next Wave	Angel Studios	Infogrames	2003-03-18^{NA}	Unreleased	March 18, 2003	Unreleased	
Trigger Man	Point of View	Crave Entertainment	2004-09-28^{NA}	Unreleased	September 28, 2004	Unreleased	
True Crime: New York City	Exakt Entertainment	Activision	2005-11-16^{NA}	Unreleased	November 16, 2005	November 25, 2005	
True Crime: Streets of LA	Exakt Entertainment	Activision	2003-11-04^{NA}	Unreleased	November 4, 2003	November 21, 2003	
Tube Slider	NDcube	Interchannel	2003-04-15^{NA}	Unreleased	April 15, 2003	Unreleased	
Turok: Evolution	Acclaim Studios Austin	Acclaim Entertainment	2002-09-01^{NA}	Unreleased	September 1, 2002	September 27, 2002	
Ty the Tasmanian Tiger	Krome Studios	EA Games	2002-10-09^{NA}	Unreleased	October 9, 2002	November 22, 2002	
Ty the Tasmanian Tiger 2: Bush Rescue	Krome Studios	EA Games	2004-10-12^{NA}	Unreleased	October 12, 2004	October 29, 2004^{AUS} November 5, 2004^{EU}	
Ty the Tasmanian Tiger 3: Night of the Quinkan	Krome Studios	Activision	2005-10-12^{NA}	Unreleased	October 12, 2005	Unreleased	
UEFA Champions League 2004-2005	EA Sports	EA Sports	2005-02-04^{PAL}	Unreleased	Unreleased	February 4, 2005	
UFC: Throwdown	Opus	Crave Entertainment^{NA} Capcom^{JP} Ubi Soft^{PAL}	2002-07-30^{NA}	September 5, 2002	July 30, 2002	September 20, 2002	
Ultimate Muscle: Legends vs. New Generation	AKI Corporation	Bandai	2002-11-22^{JP}	November 22, 2002	June 5, 2003	Unreleased	
Ultimate Spider-Man	Treyarch	Activision^{WW} Taito^{JP}	2005-09-22^{NA}	June 29, 2006	September 22, 2005	October 12, 2005^{AUS} October 14, 2005^{EU}	
Universal Studios Theme Parks Adventure	Nai'a Digital Works	Kemco	2001-12-07^{JP}	December 7, 2001	December 18, 2001	May 3, 2002^{EU} May 17, 2002^{AUS}	
The Urbz: Sims in the City	Maxis	EA Games	2004-11-09^{NA}	January 13, 2005	November 9, 2004	November 12, 2004	
V-Rally 3	Eden Studios	Infogrames	2003-06-27^{PAL}	July 10, 2003	Unreleased	June 27, 2003	
Vexx	Acclaim Studios Austin	Acclaim Entertainment	2003-02-11^{NA}	Unreleased	February 11, 2003	April 4, 2003	
Viewtiful Joe	Capcom Production Studio 4	Capcom	2003-06-26^{JP}	June 26, 2003	October 7, 2003	October 24, 2003^{EU} October 2003^{AUS}	
Viewtiful Joe 2	Clover Studio	Capcom	2004-11-18^{NA}	December 16, 2004	November 18, 2004	April 1, 2005^{EU} April 15, 2005^{AUS}	
Viewtiful Joe: Red Hot Rumble	Clover Studio	Capcom	2005-09-29^{JP}	September 29, 2005	November 8, 2005	February 24, 2006^{EU} March 10, 2006^{AUS}	
Virtua Quest	Sega AM2; Tose	Sega	2004-08-26^{JP}	August 26, 2004	January 18, 2005	Unreleased	
Virtua Striker 2002; Virtua Striker 3 ver. 2002^{JP/PAL}	Amusement Vision	Sega	2002-02-14^{JP}	February 14, 2002	May 20, 2002	May 24, 2002	
Wallace & Gromit in Project Zoo	Frontier Developments	BAM! Entertainment	2003-10-03^{PAL}	Unreleased	October 16, 2003	October 3, 2003	
Wario World	Treasure	Nintendo	2003-06-20^{EU}	May 27, 2004	June 23, 2003	June 20, 2003^{EU} July 10, 2003^{AUS}	
WarioWare, Inc.: Mega Party Games!	Intelligent Systems; Nintendo R&D1	Nintendo	2003-10-17^{JP}	October 17, 2003	April 5, 2004	September 3, 2004	
Warrior Blade: Rastan vs. Barbarian	Saffire	Taito	2003-03-27^{JP}	March 27, 2003	Unreleased	Unreleased	
Wave Race: Blue Storm	Nintendo Software Technology	Nintendo	2001-09-14^{JP}	September 14, 2001	November 18, 2001	May 3, 2002^{EU} May 17, 2002^{AUS}	
Whirl Tour	Papaya Studio	Crave Entertainment; Vivendi Universal Games	2002-11-05^{NA}	Unreleased	November 5, 2002	March 21, 2003	
Winnie the Pooh's Rumbly Tumbly Adventure	Phoenix Studio	Ubisoft	2005-02-15^{NA}	Unreleased	February 15, 2005	March 10, 2005	
World Racing	Synetic	TDK Mediactive Europe	2004-04-08^{PAL}	Unreleased	Unreleased	April 8, 2004	
World Series of Poker	Left Field Productions	Activision	2005-09-14^{NA}	Unreleased	September 14, 2005	Unreleased	
World Soccer Winning Eleven 6 Final Evolution	Konami Computer Entertainment Tokyo	Konami	2003-01-30^{JP}	January 30, 2003	Unreleased	Unreleased	
Worms 3D	Team17	Sega^{PAL} Acclaim Entertainment^{NA}	2003-10-31^{PAL}	Unreleased	March 11, 2004	October 31, 2003	
Worms Blast	Team17	Ubi Soft	2002-09-13^{PAL}	Unreleased	October 24, 2002	September 13, 2002	
Wreckless: The Yakuza Missions	Broadsword Interactive Limited	Activision	2002-11-20^{NA}	Unreleased	November 20, 2002	November 22, 2002	
WTA Tour Tennis; Pro Tennis WTA Tour^{PAL}	Konami	Konami	2002-08-29^{JP}	August 29, 2002	September 24, 2002	September 13, 2002	
WWE Crush Hour	Pacific Data Power & Light	THQ	2003-03-18^{NA}	Unreleased	March 18, 2003	May 15, 2003	
WWE Day of Reckoning	Yuke's	THQ^{WW} Yuke's^{JP}	2004-08-30^{NA}	January 13, 2005	August 30, 2004	September 17, 2004^{EU} September 24, 2004^{AUS}	
WWE Day of Reckoning 2	Yuke's	THQ	2005-08-29^{NA}	Unreleased	August 29, 2005	September 23, 2005	
WWE WrestleMania X8	Yuke's	THQ^{WW} Yuke's^{JP}	2002-06-10^{NA}	September 6, 2002	June 10, 2002	September 27, 2002^{EU} October 9, 2002^{AUS}	
WWE WrestleMania XIX	Yuke's	THQ^{WW} Yuke's^{JP}	2003-09-08^{NA}	November 7, 2003	September 8, 2003	September 19, 2003	
X-Men Legends	Raven Software	Activision	2004-09-21^{NA}	Unreleased	September 21, 2004	October 22, 2004	
X-Men Legends II: Rise of Apocalypse	Raven Software	Activision	2005-09-20^{NA}	Unreleased	September 20, 2005	October 12, 2005^{AUS} October 14, 2005^{EU}	
X-Men: Next Dimension	Exakt Entertainment	Activision	2002-10-22^{NA}	Unreleased	October 22, 2002	November 29, 2002	
X-Men: The Official Game	Hypnos Entertainment	Activision	2006-05-16^{NA}	Unreleased	May 16, 2006	May 19, 2006	
X2: Wolverine's Revenge; X-Men 2: Wolverine's Revenge^{PAL}	GenePool Software	Activision	2003-04-15^{NA}	Unreleased	April 15, 2003	April 17, 2003	
XGRA: Extreme-G Racing Association	Acclaim Studios Cheltenham	Acclaim Entertainment	2003-11-24^{NA}	Unreleased	November 24, 2003	March 5, 2004	
XIII	Ubisoft Paris	Ubisoft	2003-11-25^{NA}	Unreleased	November 25, 2003	November 28, 2003	
Yu-Gi-Oh! The Falsebound Kingdom	Konami Computer Entertainment Japan	Konami	2002-12-05^{JP}	December 5, 2002	November 4, 2003	November 19, 2004^{EU} December 2, 2004^{AUS}	
Zapper: One Wicked Cricket	Blitz Games	Infogrames	2002-11-05^{NA}	Unreleased	November 5, 2002	March 14, 2003	
Zatch Bell! Mamodo Battles	Eighting	Bandai	2005-03-24^{JP}	March 24, 2005	October 19, 2005	Unreleased	
Zatch Bell! Mamodo Fury	Mechanic Arms	Namco Bandai Games	2006-12-12^{NA}	Unreleased	December 12, 2006	Unreleased	
Zoids Vs.	Tomy	Tomy	2002-09-06^{JP}	September 6, 2002	Unreleased	Unreleased	
Zoids Vs. III	Tomy	Tomy	2004-09-30^{JP}	September 30, 2004	Unreleased	Unreleased	
Zoids: Battle Legends; Zoids Vs. II^{JP}	Tomy	Tomy^{JP} Atari^{NA}	2003-09-05^{JP}	September 5, 2003	September 4, 2004	Unreleased	
Zoids: Full Metal Crash	Tomy	Tomy	2005-10-27^{JP}	October 27, 2005	Unreleased	Unreleased	
ZooCube	PuzzleKings	Acclaim Entertainment	2002-05-30^{NA}	October 25, 2002	May 30, 2002	August 30, 2002	

== Bonus discs and demo discs ==
Title	Developer(s)	Publisher(s)	First released	Release date			Ref.
Title	Developer(s)	Publisher(s)	First released	Japan	North America	PAL	Ref.
Mario Kart: Double Dash!! Bonus Disc	Nintendo EAD	Nintendo	2003-11-17^{NA}	Unreleased	November 17, 2003	Unreleased	
Metal Gear Solid: The Twin Snakes Special Disc	Konami Computer Entertainment Japan; Silicon Knights	Konami	2004-03-11^{JP}	March 11, 2004	Unreleased	Unreleased	
Metroid Prime 2: Echoes Bonus Disc	Retro Studios	Nintendo	2004-11-15^{NA}	Unreleased	November 15, 2004	Unreleased	
Nintendo GameCube Preview Disc	Nintendo	Nintendo	2003-05-30^{NA}	Unreleased	May 30, 2003	Unreleased	
Pokémon Colosseum Bonus Disc	Genius Sonority	The Pokémon Company^{JP} Nintendo^{WW}	2003-11-21^{JP}	November 21, 2003	March 22, 2004	Unreleased	
Star Wars Rogue Squadron III: Rebel Strike Preview Disc	Factor 5	LucasArts	2003-10-28^{WW}	Unreleased	October 28, 2003	October 28, 2003	

== See also ==
- List of best-selling GameCube video games
- List of Dreamcast games
- List of PlayStation 2 games
- List of Xbox games
