= Jeremy McGrath Supercross =

- Genre(s): Racing
- Developer(s): Atod and Probe Entertainment (1998); Acclaim Studios Salt Lake City (2000-01); 2XL Games (2012)
- Publisher(s): Acclaim Sports (1998-2001); D3 Publisher (2012)
- Platform(s): PlayStation, Nintendo 64, Game Boy Color, Dreamcast, PlayStation 2, GameCube, PlayStation 3, Xbox 360
- First release: Jeremy McGrath Supercross 98; June 22, 1998
- Latest release: Jeremy McGrath's Offroad; June 27, 2012

Jeremy McGrath Supercross is a racing video game video game series published by Acclaim Sports. The first game was a joint development by Atod and Probe Entertainment before Acclaim Studios Salt Lake City took over developing the next two games. After Acclaim went bankrupt in 2005, 2XL Games developed the recent entry in the series called Jeremy McGrath's Offroad.

== Games ==
Aggregate review scores
| Game | Metacritic |
|---|---|
| Jeremy McGrath Supercross 98 | (PS1) 59% (Note: GameRankings score) |
| Jeremy McGrath Supercross 2000 | (DC) 43/100 (GBC) 69% (N64) 57% (PS1) 43/100 |
| Jeremy McGrath Supercross World | (GC) 36/100 (PS2) 35/100 |
| Jeremy McGrath's Offroad | (PS3) 61/100 (X360) 60/100 |

=== Jeremy McGrath Supercross 98 (1998) ===
Information needed

=== Jeremy McGrath Supercross 2000 (2000) ===
Information needed

=== Jeremy McGrath Supercross World (2001) ===
Information needed

=== Jeremy McGrath's Offroad (2012) ===
Information needed
