= Extreme Racing =

Extreme Racing may refer to:

- San Francisco Rush: Extreme Racing, a 1996 video game
- Suzuki Alstare Extreme Racing, a 1999 video game
- Hot Wheels Extreme Racing, a 2001 video game
- Antz Extreme Racing, a 2002 video game
- Extreme Racing, a cancelled video game by Trilobyte
- Extreme racing, a timed version of the kayak discipline creeking

== See also ==
- List of extreme and adventure sports
