= Backyard football =

Backyard Football may refer to:

- Street football (American), a real-life game
- Backyard Football, an American football video game series
  - Backyard Football (2002 video game), a GameCube game by Infogrames
