= 2XL TrophyLite Rally =

2010 video game

- Developer: 2XL Games
- Platform: iOS
- Release: June 10, 2010
- Genre: Racing game
- Mode: Single-player

2XL TrophyLite Rally is a racing video game developed by American studio 2XL Games and released on June 10, 2010, for iOS.

== Critical reception ==
Reception

Aggregate score
Aggregator	Score
Metacritic	71/100

Review scores
Publication	Score
GamePro	3.5/5
Gamezebo	3.5/5
Pocket Gamer	3/5

The game received "mixed or average reviews" according to the review aggregation website Metacritic. Pocket Gamer said: "Best described as the Desert Megan Fox, 2XL TrophyLite Rally looks beautiful, handles well, but lacks variation, challenge, and depth." Gamezebo called it "A brilliantly constructed racer that's missing its heart."
