= Jeremy McGrath Supercross 98 =

1998 video game

Jeremy McGrath Supercross '98
- European box art
- Developers: Atod; Probe Entertainment
- Publisher: Acclaim Entertainment (Note: Released under the Acclaim Sports label)
- Series: Jeremy McGrath Supercross
- Platform: PlayStation
- Release: NA: June 3, 1998; EU: July 1998
- Genre: Racing
- Modes: Single-player, multiplayer

Jeremy McGrath Supercross '98 is a racing video game developed by Atod (A&D) and Probe Entertainment and published by Acclaim Entertainment under their Acclaim Sports banner exclusively for PlayStation. It was licensed to use the name and likeness of Supercross champion Jeremy McGrath.

The game allows two-player racing via a split screen. Players can create their own custom bike and custom tracks, which can be saved to a memory card.

== Reception ==
Reception

Aggregate score
Aggregator	Score
GameRankings	59%

Review scores
Publication	Score
Electronic Gaming Monthly	6.5/10
GameSpot	5.4/10
IGN	5/10

The game received "mixed" reviews according to the review aggregation website GameRankings.
