= Jeremy McGrath Supercross 2000 =

2000 video game

- Developer: Acclaim Studios Salt Lake City
- Publisher: Acclaim Entertainment (Note: Released under the Acclaim Sports label)
- Series: Jeremy McGrath Supercross
- Platforms: Nintendo 64, Game Boy Color, PlayStation, Dreamcast
- Release: Nintendo 64: NA: February 28, 2000; EU: September 19, 2000; Game Boy Color: NA: March 31, 2000; EU: November 24, 2000; PlayStation: NA: August 3, 2000; EU: September 1, 2000; Dreamcast: NA: August 8, 2000; EU: September 8, 2000
- Genre: Racing
- Modes: Single-player, multiplayer

Jeremy McGrath Supercross 2000 is a motocross racing video game developed by Acclaim Studios Salt Lake City and published by Acclaim Entertainment under their Acclaim Sports label for Nintendo 64, Game Boy Color, PlayStation and Dreamcast. It features eight stadium tracks, eight outdoor tracks, and an option for players to create their own custom tracks. In addition to having a racing game mode, players could perform dirt bike tricks in a stunt mode.

== Reception ==
Reception

Aggregate scores
Aggregator	Score			
Aggregator	Dreamcast	GBC	N64	PS
GameRankings	42%	69%	57%	48%
Metacritic	43/100	N/A	N/A	43/100

Review scores
Publication	Score			
Publication	Dreamcast	GBC	N64	PS
AllGame	N/A	N/A	2.5/5	1.5/5
CNET Gamecenter	3/10	6/10	N/A	3/10
Electronic Gaming Monthly	N/A	N/A	5/10 (Note: In Electronic Gaming Monthly's review of the Nintendo 64 version, one critic gave it a score of 7/10, two others gave it each a score of 4/10, and the other gave it 5/10.)	3.5/10
EP Daily	4/10	N/A	N/A	4/10
Game Informer	3.75/10	N/A	5/10	4/10
GameFan	N/A	N/A	71% (Note: In GameFan's viewpoint of the Nintendo 64 version, one critic gave it 75, and the other 67.)	66%
GameRevolution	D	N/A	N/A	C−
GameSpot	5.3/10	N/A	5.5/10	4.5/10
GameSpy	4/10	N/A	N/A	21%
IGN	4/10	7/10	4.9/10	4/10
N64 Magazine	N/A	N/A	53%	N/A
Next Generation	2/5	N/A	N/A	N/A
Nintendo Power	N/A	N/A	6.4/10	N/A
Official U.S. PlayStation Magazine	N/A	N/A	N/A	1.5/5

The Dreamcast and PlayStation versions received "generally unfavorable reviews" according to the review aggregation website Metacritic. Doug Trueman of NextGen said that there was "no doubt" that the former console version "will boost sales of Excitebike 64." Vicious Sid of GamePro said of the Nintendo 64 version, "While not a groundbreaking supercross title, McGrath is a big improvement over most dirt-bike racers. In a suddenly bustling genre, McGrath's intuitive gameplay and well-rounded modes help it stand out from the crowd." (Note: GamePro gave the Nintendo 64 version three 4/5 scores for graphics, sound, and fun factor, and 5/5 for control.)
