= Baja: Edge of Control =

2008 video game

- Developers: 2XL Games; BlitWorks (HD)
- Publishers: THQ; THQ Nordic (HD)
- Platforms: PlayStation 3, Xbox 360, PlayStation 4, Xbox One, Windows
- Release: PlayStation 3, Xbox 360: NA: September 22, 2008; AU: September 25, 2008; EU: September 26, 2008; Windows, PlayStation 4, Xbox One; September 14, 2017
- Genre: Racing
- Modes: Single-player, multiplayer

Baja: Edge of Control is a 2008 off-road racing video game developed by 2XL Games and published by THQ for PlayStation 3 and Xbox 360. The game gets its name from the real life Baja 1000 off-road race in Baja California and Baja California Sur, Mexico, on which it is based. The game is set on over 95 different tracks, including three different Baja 250 courses, two Baja 500 courses, one Baja 1000 course, and has nine open world environments.

== Gameplay ==
The game is targeted as an arcade off road racer, similar to Colin McRae: Dirt and is based on endurance racing across the desert. Multiplayer options include playing other players through Xbox Live, PlayStation Network, System Link and up to four player split-screen.

== Reception ==
Baja: Edge of Control

Aggregate score
Aggregator	Score	
Aggregator	PS3	Xbox 360
Metacritic	61/100	65/100

Review scores
Publication	Score	
Publication	PS3	Xbox 360
4Players	62%	75%
Edge	N/A	5/10
Eurogamer	N/A	6/10
Game Informer	8/10	8/10
GamePro	N/A	2.5/5
GameSpot	6.5/10	7.5/10
GameSpy	3.5/5	3.5/5
GameTrailers	7/10	7/10
GameZone	6/10	6/10
IGN	4.9/10	6.9/10
Jeuxvideo.com	11/20	11/20
MeriStation	N/A	6/10
Official Xbox Magazine (US)	N/A	8/10
PlayStation: The Official Magazine	3/5	N/A

Baja: Edge of Control received "mixed" reviews on both platforms according to the review aggregation website Metacritic.

The game was nominated for the best racing game of 2008 by GameSpot.

== Remaster ==
A remaster of the original game, Baja: Edge of Control HD, was released worldwide in September 2017 for PlayStation 4, Xbox One and Microsoft Windows. It features 4K compatibility and improved rendering techniques for shadows, lighting and dust effects.

=== Reception ===
Baja: Edge of Control HD

Aggregate score
Aggregator	Score
Metacritic	(XOne) 67/100 (PS4) 65/100 (PC) 62/100

Review scores
Publication	Score
4Players	77%
Jeuxvideo.com	12/20
MeriStation	6.5/10
Push Square	(PS4) 7/10

The HD version received "mixed or average reviews" on all platforms according to Metacritic.
