= 2XL ATV Offroad =

2009 video game

- Developer: 2XL Games
- Platforms: Mobile phones, iOS
- Release: Mobile; September 30, 2009 iOS; October 14, 2009
- Genre: Racing game
- Mode: Single-player

2XL ATV Offroad is a racing video game developed by 2XL Games and released in 2009 for mobile phones and iOS.

== Gameplay ==
The game features 3 different track types to compete in: Nationals (outdoor tracks), Supercross and Freestyle (stunt tracks). It has an Arcade mode, which allows racing among any of the 16 available tracks, a Career mode (considered the main one), and a multiplayer mode through either Wi-Fi or Bluetooth.

Each of the game's tracks varies in its design, from Rubicon (pines covered in snow) to Castle Rock (dust and cacti). Career mode has the player moving through a chain of 11 leagues, made of various events with track combinations. Unlocking the new vehicles, upgrading, or customization are not featured.

Offroad defaults to a tilt-based control system, with steering being handled by the device itself. There's an alternative included in virtual analogue stick control scheme. On-screen buttons are used for accelerating and brake, with some smaller buttons for performing tricks.

== Reception ==
Reception

Aggregate score
Aggregator	Score
Metacritic	84/100

Review scores
Publication	Score
IGN	7.2/10
Pocket Gamer	3.5/5
TouchArcade	4.5/5
VideoGamer.com	8/10
Sutton & Croydon Guardian	7/10

The iOS version received "favorable" reviews according to the review aggregation website Metacritic.
