= Troddlers =

1992 video game

- Developer: Atod
- Publishers: The Sales Curve; Seika
- Composer: Allister Brimble
- Platforms: Amiga, Super NES, MS-DOS
- Release: 1992 (Amiga); 1993 (MS-DOS, SNES)
- Genre: Puzzle
- Modes: Single-player, multiplayer

Troddlers is a 1992 Lemmings-inspired puzzle game developed by Atod that was originally released for the Amiga and was later remade on the Super NES. The remake was published by Seika. An MS-DOS port was also released.

== Story ==
Once upon a time in a far away castle in a magical land lived the sorcerer Divinius and his two apprentices, Hokus and Pokus. These two were little rascals who were always causing trouble, much to the annoyance of Divinius. Divinius despaired of them ever learning anything of use.

One day, Hokus and Pokus swapped the lids around in the larder and Divinius put Marmite on his shoes instead of polish. This caused Divinius to reach the end of his tether. He sent Hokus and Pokus down to the storeroom to clear it out. No one had tidied up that room for a few centuries, and he was hoping that this task would keep the pair out of mischief for a good few days. He commanded them not to touch anything.

Unknown to Divinius, his apprentices did not intend to labor at all for a few hours. After some time went by, the apprentices realized it was nearly suppertime and they had not done any work yet. They decided to shift some of the boxes around to make it appear as if they had actually been doing something.

They had just reached the second pile of boxes when, out of reach they saw a box with the word "WARNING!" in bright red written across it. They hurriedly cleared everything away and carefully dragged it out where they could see it better. The box read: "WARNING! Instant magical Troddlers - Just add water. May turn into zombified variety if allowed to teleport. DO NOT TOUCH!" This intrigued the naughty duo who decided they ought to investigate further.

Unknown to them, Divinius was so fed up with their pranks that he decided to try to make some Troddlers (small, artificially created men) so they could one day replace Hokus and Pokus.

Hokus and Pokus thought that these Troddlers could be used to finish cleaning the storeroom. In their haste to get at the Troddlers they ripped the box and spilled Troddlers powder in their cleaning bucket. The powder turned into Troddlers who burst out of the bucket and all over the floor. There were hundreds of them. The Troddlers, who apparently have animal-like minds, instinctively began walking toward a teleporter (which appeared to be a little door) at the far end of the storeroom as if they were hypnotized. Hokus and Pokus had no idea what to do.

Just as the last Troddler was walking through the teleporter, Divinius stormed in. He not could believe what his apprentices had done. He angrily commanded Hokus and Pokus to: "Go after them right this instant and get back as many as you can!!" Hokus and Pokus were quickly forced toward the teleporter. As they shot through the door, Divinius shrieked: "And don't bring back any bleedin' zombies!!"

== Gameplay ==
In Troddlers, the player plays as Hokus alone in solo mode. In multiplayer modes, player 2 plays as Pokus. The game is broken up into missions. Before each mission, a screen telling the mission objective and a few facts about the level (such as the number of Troddlers) is shown. A player must complete whatever task is given to them within the time limit (usually a few minutes). There are three main objectives that appear in the game: the more common objective involves leading stray Troddlers to an exit, somewhat similar to the gameplay in Lemmings. Another objective commonly given is the destruction of zombie Troddlers. The third involves collecting gems. Many levels combine two of these objectives and sometimes all three. There are, naturally, many obstacles and enemies throughout the game.

=== Basic Gameplay Mechanics ===
Unlike in Lemmings, Troddlers places the player in control of a character on the screen, thus adding some platforming elements to the game. One of the game's distinguishing features is the ability to magically place and erase building blocks, like in Solomon's Key. These blocks are the size of the player, and can be placed in any direction next to the wizard placing it as long as there is not an object the same size of the block in that area already. The main purpose of these blocks is to form a path to the exit for the wandering Troddlers. When a block is erased, it is stored visibly in a tube to the right of the screen. This tube displays how many blocks the player is holding, and when it is empty, no blocks can be placed. Up to 15 blocks can be stored in the tube, and once it becomes full, no blocks can be erased unless a stored block is placed somewhere else on the screen (thus freeing a space in the storage tube). There are many different types of blocks in the game, each of which has its own special effect. The block on the bottom of the storage tube is always the one placed, and when a block is erased, it is automatically stored on the top. In multiplayer modes, each character has their own storage tube. It is possible to erase a block while jumping from it at the same time, which allows players to climb up to high heights without obtaining and stacking numerous blocks.

Troddlers themselves are never wandering around in a level to begin with; they always enter from a special entrance after a fixed amount of time. These creatures will always walk in the same direction if left undisturbed. Also, they can walk on walls and ceilings. Each level involving the rescue of Troddlers includes at least one exit in which the Troddlers must exit. These exits are sometimes placed sideways on walls or upside-down on ceilings.

If a block is placed directly on a Troddler, it will perish. When a block is erased while a Troddler is walking on it, the Troddler will fall. Dropping a Troddler from too high a height will result in death. If a Troddler survives the drop, it will begin walking in the opposite direction from which it was walking before.

Zombie Troddlers behave in the same manner as normal Troddlers. If one happens to make contact with a normal Troddler, both will die and become a cloud of dust. These zombies will also use exits in levels as normal Troddlers do. When a zombie exits a level, it does not count as destroyed. The player must be careful not to let zombies near an exit during a mission that involves the destruction of a certain number of zombies. Before each mission that includes zombie Troddlers, the mission screen will display how many there are and whether they are "lethal" or "harmless". Both varieties will destroy normal Troddlers (as well as themselves) on contact, but only the lethal type can damage Hokus or Pokus by touching them.

There are three different colors of gems that appear in the game: red, green, and blue. Stages will always specify how many of each color the player must gather. Sometimes the gems are already present when the mission starts, but at other times a player must manufacture them. This is done with rocks. When a rock is dropped on a certain object, both the rock and the object will be destroyed and up to four gems will form. If there are walls or other objects right next to where the rock makes contact, it will prevent one gem from forming there. Placing a rock on a Troddler (including zombies) will result in red gems. Sometimes a mission will require the player to rescue only a few Troddlers, thus leaving a few spare victims if it is required to create some red gems. Hurling a rock onto another rock results in the formation of green gems. When a non-Troddler enemy is struck with a rock, blue gems appear.

Rocks, like blocks, are the size of Hokus and Pokus. However, rocks cannot be erased; they must be pushed. Also, Troddlers cannot walk on them. If a Troddler encounters a rock on the ground, it will walk the other way. While trekking up a wall or ceiling, Troddlers will fall if they happen to run into a rock.

=== SNES Mouse Gameplay ===
The Super NES remake is compatible with the SNES Mouse. A player controls a crosshair on the screen instead of Hokus or Pokus when using one. Clicking on an area will result in Hokus or Pokus moving there if it is an area they can reach. Building blocks is done by right-clicking. To jump and erase a block below the character at the same time, both mouse buttons must be pressed and then released where the player wants Hokus or Pokus to jump.

== Reception ==
Reception

Aggregate score
Aggregator	Score
GameRankings	69%(SNES)

Review score
Publication	Score
GameZone	89/100 (SNES)

Abandonware website Abandonia's Swiss reviewed Troddlers with "Troddlers is COOL!"

PC Gamer's Jon Smith gave the game an 82% rating, in a review that mostly makes a comparison with Lemmings and its addictive aspect, stating that "Troddlers will do your mental health no favours at all". He then concludes: "Troddlers has its drawbacks, of course – the fact that the controls aren't perfectly responsive makes it sometimes a little hard to work out what's going on, and some of the features verge in the gimmicky – but I've still got a suspicion that this one will capture your heart and mind for far longer than can possibly be good for you." In 1995, Total! listed the game 62nd on its Top 100 SNES Games writing: "A sort of Lemmings/Krusty's hybrid with a bit of Solomon's Key thrown in. Jolly good fun."
