= 2XL Supercross =

2009 video game

- Developer: 2XL Games
- Platforms: iOS, Android
- Release: April 1, 2009
- Genre: Racing game
- Mode: Single-player

2XL Supercross is an iOS game developed by American studio 2XL Games and released on April 1, 2009.

== Critical reception ==
CommonSenseMedia gave it 3.5, writing "The best part of 2XL SUPERCROSS HD is its visual presentation. The detailed courses look great, and there is no loss to the fidelity of graphics even during the high-speed races. It enhances the vicarious thrill of driving through the intense motocross courses. However, the graphics are only one component of a game, and unfortunately this title suffers in other areas, such as a lack of gameplay variety and replayability. Players looking for an engaging game with challenging single-player options or a wide selection of courses may be disappointed here, but as a standalone, basic racing game it excels." Pocket Gamer gave it 7/10, commenting "2XL Supercross is perfect for showcasing the platform's visual prowess, but remains rather soulless overall. It's a glimpse into off-road bliss that's over no sooner than you've turned the engine over and flung a little mud."

IGN gave it 7.5, writing "2XL Supercross has the potential to be a must-have racing game, it just needs some structure -- a blueprint for the player to at least consider. Right now, it's a gorgeous racing game that provides a few minutes of packed-dirt thrills before attention starts to wander. I'm not opposed to games that hand over the keys to the kingdom, but that's not what 2XL Supercross should be. Buy it if you are a supercross fan that loves the sport or Stephane Roncada. But just know what you are getting into -- a great racing mechanic in searching of a great racing game. And that might not be worth $7.99 to a lot of players."

TouchArcade wrote "If you're a fan of motocross, or racing games in general, you probably own it already (and rightfully so). If you're looking for something to knock your socks off graphically or to show your iPhone off to other people and you don't necessarily care about replay value, 2XL Supercross is still the game to get." SlideToPlay gave it 3.4, commenting "If you're looking to spend a little bit more on a beautifully constructed racing game, 2XL Supercross is a great bet. " AppSpy gave it 4/5, writing "Although Supercross has many positive attributes, it's in a rather high price bracket. This, combined with the lack of multiplayer might put people off this game but this reviewer definitely enjoyed playing it."
