= Top Angler: Real Bass Fishing =

2002 video game

- North American PS2 cover art
- Developer: SIMS
- Publishers: SIMS, Xicat Interactive
- Platforms: PlayStation 2, GameCube
- Release: PlayStation 2: JP: March 7, 2002; NA: December 9, 2003; PAL: May 17, 2002; GameCube: NA: January 1, 2003; PAL: July 18, 2003
- Genre: Fishing
- Modes: Single-player, multiplayer

Top Angler: Real Bass Fishing (リアルバスフィッシング トップアングラー, Riaru Basu Fisshingu Toppu Angurā) is a fishing video game developed by SIMS. The game was released for PlayStation 2 in 2002.

== Gameplay ==
The game is a real-time bass fishing simulator. The season and time of each stage are dictated by the internal clock of the player's PlayStation 2. Weather effects such as wind and waves are also depicted in real-time to increase player immersion. There are several gameplay modes: "Tournament Mode" is based on an American bass tournament, "Arcade Mode" is a score competition, "Challenge Mode" has skill-testing challenges, and "Practice Mode" is an open, un-timed fishing simulator that allows the player to customize their environment.

== Reception ==
The game averaged a score of 51% on GameRankings.
