= Home Run King =

2002 video game

- Cover art featuring Jeff Bagwell
- Developer(s): WOW Entertainment
- Publisher(s): Sega
- Platform(s): GameCube
- Release: NA: March 19, 2002
- Genre(s): Sports
- Mode(s): Single-player, Multiplayer

Home Run King is a sports video game released in 2002 by WOW Entertainment. A sequel, Home Run King 2, was developed by Lavastorm and released on March 19, 2005 for Java ME.
