= Rei Fighter Gekitsui Senki =

2003 video game

- Developer: Global A Entertainment
- Publisher: Global A Entertainment
- Platform: GameCube
- Release: JP: March 6, 2003
- Genre: Combat flight simulation
- Modes: Single-player, multiplayer

Rei Fighter Gekitsui Senki is a combat flight simulation published in 2003 by Global A Entertainment. It was only released in Japan.
