= Mutsu to Nohohon =

2002 video game

- Developer: Tomy
- Publisher: Tomy
- Platform: GameCube
- Release: JP: July 19, 2002
- Genre: Simulation
- Mode: Single-player

Mutsu to Nohohon is a simulation video game released for the GameCube exclusively in Japan by Tomy in 2002.

== Gameplay ==
The player controls a mutsu, either a snow bunny, bear, hamster, or penguin, which swims around its kingdom.

There are 12 levels, one for each month of the year.

== Reception ==
Reception

Review score
Publication	Score
Famitsu	25/40

It received a score of 25/40 from Famitsu.
