= Freestyle MetalX =

2003 video game

- PAL region cover art
- Developer: Deibus Studios
- Publisher: Midway Sports Asylum
- Platforms: PlayStation 2, GameCube, Xbox
- Release: PlayStation 2: NA: 24 June 2003; EU: 19 September 2003; Xbox: EU: 19 September 2003; NA: 3 October 2003; GameCube: NA: 3 October 2003
- Genre: Sports
- Modes: Single-player, multiplayer

Freestyle MetalX is an extreme sports video game developed by British developer Deibus Studios and released in 2003 by Midway for PlayStation 2, GameCube and Xbox. It is a 3D motorcycle stunt game that rewards the player for pulling off difficult moves.

The game's soundtrack to the game consists of hard rock and metal music, including bands such as Megadeth, Mötley Crüe, Motörhead, and Grade 8.

== Reception ==
Reception

Aggregate score
Aggregator	Score		
Aggregator	GameCube	PS2	Xbox
Metacritic	70/100	67/100	67/100

Review scores
Publication	Score		
Publication	GameCube	PS2	Xbox
Electronic Gaming Monthly	N/A	4.83/10	N/A
Game Informer	N/A	7/10	7/10
GamePro	N/A	4.5/5	N/A
GameRevolution	N/A	C+	N/A
GameSpot	N/A	6/10	N/A
GameZone	N/A	8.8/10	8.6/10
IGN	7.6/10	7.6/10	N/A
Nintendo Power	3/5	N/A	N/A
Official U.S. PlayStation Magazine	N/A	3/5	N/A
Official Xbox Magazine (US)	N/A	N/A	6.5/10
Maxim	N/A	7/10	N/A
The Village Voice	N/A	6/10	N/A

The game received "average" reviews on all platforms according to the review aggregation website Metacritic.
