= List of games by 2XL Games =

2XL Games, founded in 2005, is a video game development studio based in Phoenix, Arizona.

== List of games ==
Title	Details
Baja: Edge of Control Original release date: September 22, 2008	Release years by system: 2008 – PlayStation 3, Xbox 360; 2017 – Microsoft Windows, PlayStation 4, Xbox One
Baja: Edge of Control Original release date: September 22, 2008	Notes: Published by THQ Nordic
2XL Supercross Original release date: April 1, 2009	Release years by system: 2009 – iOS; 2010 – Microsoft Windows
2XL ATV Offroad Original release date: October 8, 2009	Release years by system: 2009 – iOS
2XL Fleet Defense Original release date: December 5, 2009	Release years by system: 2009 – iOS
2XL Fleet Defense Original release date: December 5, 2009	Notes: An arcade video game that puts the player in control of F-35 plane during the international crisis; The player chooses which enemy to target on a 2D field with a base at the center that can take only a certain amount of damage
X Games SnoCross Original release date: 2010	Release years by system: 2010 – iOS
2XL TrophyLite Rally Original release date: June 10, 2010	Release years by system: 2010 – iOS
Ricky Carmichael’s Motocross Matchup Original release date: 2011	Release years by system: 2011 – iOS; 2012 – Microsoft Windows, Android
2XL MX Offroad Original release date: 2011	Release years by system: 2011 – Android; 2012 – iOS
Jeremy McGrath's Offroad Original release date: June 27, 2012	Release years by system: 2012 – PlayStation 3, Xbox 360
2XL Racing Original release date: 2014	Release years by system: 2014 – iOS, Android
