= Jeremy McGrath Supercross World =

2001 video game

- Developer: Acclaim Studios Salt Lake City
- Publisher: Acclaim Entertainment (Note: Released under the Acclaim Max Sports label)
- Series: Jeremy McGrath Supercross
- Platforms: PlayStation 2, GameCube
- Release: PlayStation 2: NA: November 14, 2001; EU: February 8, 2002; GameCube: NA: February 26, 2002; EU: June 7, 2002
- Genre: Racing
- Modes: Single-player, multiplayer

Jeremy McGrath Supercross World is a racing video game developed by Acclaim Studios Salt Lake City and published by Acclaim Entertainment under their Acclaim Max Sports label for PlayStation 2 and GameCube.

== Reception ==
Reception

Aggregate score
Aggregator	Score	
Aggregator	GameCube	PS2
Metacritic	36/100	35/100

Review scores
Publication	Score	
Publication	GameCube	PS2
AllGame	2/5	N/A
Electronic Gaming Monthly	3/10	N/A
Game Informer	N/A	5/10
GameSpot	2.4/10	2.4/10
GameSpy	N/A	25%
GameZone	6/10	N/A
IGN	3.8/10	4.9/10
Nintendo Power	2.5/5	N/A
Nintendo World Report	3.5/10	N/A
Official U.S. PlayStation Magazine	N/A	1/5

The game received "unfavorable" reviews on both platforms according to the review aggregation website Metacritic.

The PlayStation 2 version was nominated for GameSpot's 2001 "Worst Game" award among console games, which went to Kabuki Warriors. Its 2002 GameCube version won the site's "Worst Game on GameCube" award the following year.

The Jeremy McGrath franchise has sold nearly two million units worldwide by November 2001.
