= Hot Wheels Extreme Racing =

2001 video game

Hot Wheels: Extreme Racing
- PAL version cover art featuring Cat-A-Pult
- Developers: Atod, HotGen
- Publisher: THQ
- Series: Hot Wheels
- Platform: PlayStation
- Release: NA: September 25, 2001; PAL: October 12, 2001
- Genre: Racing
- Modes: Single-player; Multiplayer

Hot Wheels: Extreme Racing is a racing game for the PlayStation, released in 2001. It features vehicles based on the Hot Wheels series of toys.

== Gameplay ==
The basic gameplay is similar to most racing games. The player controls their car in order to get around the tracks as fast as possible. By collecting pickups they can obtain new properties, such as nitro boosts, oil slicks, projectiles and other weapons. The computer-controlled cars can also collect pickups. The game contains a total of 24 stages, of which 12 are simply reversed versions of the first twelve.

In Hot Wheels Extreme Racing the vehicles have the ability to transform into four different element types: land, water, air, and all-terrain. In transformation the body of the car stays normal while the side of the car "grows" wheels, wings or fins. The stages are divided into different parts, each designed for a specific vehicle. The parts are separated by a "transformation portal". When the players drive though such a portal the vehicle will change into another type.

== Game modes ==
Hot Wheel Extreme Racing features four game modes: Championship, Arcade, Time Trial and Multiplayer. In Championship mode the player races against three other computer-controlled cars in one of the available cups. There are six Cups, Easy, Medium, Hard, Rev.Easy, Rev.Medium, and Rev. Hard. Each cup contains four stages. Points are given according to placement, and after all stages a winner is appointed. By winning a cup unlocks an hidden cheat code, such as new vehicles, and more cups. The players can choose from 8 different vehicles. 3 are available on start, the rest must be unlocked by completing tasks such as completing cups.

Arcade mode allows the player to choose one of the available tracks, and then race it against three other computer-controlled cars. In time trial mode they race alone and must try to get the best time on each track.

The game also supports a multiplayer mode that allows up to four players to race against each other, using a multitap device. The multiplayer tracks are not the same as the single player tracks. There are a total of 12 multiplayer tracks.

== Reception ==
Reception

Aggregate score
Aggregator	Score
Metacritic	53/100

Review scores
Publication	Score
Computer and Video Games	4/10
IGN	5/10

The game received "mixed" reviews according to video game review aggregator Metacritic.
