= MLB Slugfest 2004 =

2003 video game

- Developers: Point of View (GC, Xbox); Criterion Games (PS2); Handheld Games (GBA)
- Publisher: Midway Sports
- Series: MLB Slugfest
- Platforms: GameCube, PlayStation 2, Xbox, Game Boy Advance
- Release: NA: March 17, 2003
- Genre: Sports (baseball)
- Modes: Single-player, multiplayer

MLB Slugfest 2004, often stylized as MLB Slugfest 20-04, is a baseball video game published by Midway Sports in 2003 for the GameCube, PlayStation 2, Xbox and Game Boy Advance. It is the second game in the MLB Slugfest series. Jim Edmonds from the St. Louis Cardinals is the cover athlete.

== Reception ==
Reception

Aggregate score
| Aggregator | Score | | | |
| Aggregator | GBA | GameCube | PS2 | Xbox |
|---|---|---|---|---|
| Metacritic | 43/100 | 76/100 | 78/100 | 76/100 |

Review scores
| Publication | Score | | | |
| Publication | GBA | GameCube | PS2 | Xbox |
|---|---|---|---|---|
| AllGame | 2.5/5 | N/A | N/A | N/A |
| Electronic Gaming Monthly | N/A | N/A | 7.17/10 (Note: Three critics of Electronic Gaming Monthly gave the PlayStation 2 version each a score of 8/10, 7/10, and 6.5/10.) | N/A |
| Game Informer | N/A | 6.75/10 | 6/10 | 6.75/10 |
| GameRevolution | N/A | N/A | B− | N/A |
| GameSpot | 2.9/10 | 8/10 | 8/10 | 8/10 |
| GameSpy | N/A | 3/5 | 3/5 | 3/5 |
| GameZone | 6.4/10 | 8/10 | 8.5/10 | 9/10 |
| IGN | 4.5/10 | 8/10 | 8/10 | 8/10 |
| Nintendo Power | 2.7/5 | 3.1/5 | N/A | N/A |
| Nintendo World Report | N/A | 8/10 | N/A | N/A |
| Official U.S. PlayStation Magazine | N/A | N/A | 4/5 | N/A |
| Official Xbox Magazine (US) | N/A | N/A | N/A | 8.4/10 |
| X-Play | N/A | N/A | 4/5 | N/A |

The game received "generally favorable reviews" on all platforms except the Game Boy Advance version, which received "unfavorable" reviews, according to the review aggregation website Metacritic. GamePro said of the game, "Even if you wouldn't normally play a baseball game, give MLB SlugFest 20-04 [sic] a rent, if only to hear the awesome audio." (Note: GamePro gave all console versions 4.5/5 for sound and 4/5 for fun factor; the only differences are that the magazine gave the GameCube and PlayStation 2 versions 4/5 for graphics and 4.5/5 for control, while the Xbox version was given 4.5/5 for the former and 4/5 for the latter.)
