= Atod =

Swedish video game developer

Atod AB LG Software
- Type: Subsidiary
- Industry: Video games
- Founded: 1987; 39 years ago (CrossTechnics); 1992; 34 years ago (Atod Design AB); May 2006; 20 years ago (Eidos Studios, Sweden AB)
- Founders: Christofer Nilsson; Thomas Liljetoft
- Defunct: 2003; 23 years ago
- Fate: Merged into Warthog Games and renamed to Warthog Sweden
- Successors: Warthog Games; Warthog Sweden
- Headquarters: Helsingborg, Sweden
- Parent: LG Corporation

Atod AB/LG Software AB (also known as 42-Bit AB) was a video game developer located in Helsingborg, Sweden.

== History ==
=== CrossTechnics/Atod Design KB/Atod AB era ===
It was established in 1987 as CrossTechnics, and was formally incorporated as Atod Design KB and Atod AB in 1992 by the game development duo Christofer Nilsson and Thomas Liljetoft.

=== Warthog Sweden/42-bit AB era ===
In 2003, Atod AB was merged with British game developer Warthog Games and renamed to Warthog Sweden.

=== Eidos Studios, Sweden AB era ===
In May 2006, the company was acquired by British publisher and developer Eidos Interactive and became Eidos Studios, Sweden AB.

Today the company is part of Square Enix who acquired Eidos Interactive in 2009.

== Games ==
=== ATOD AB era ===
- Hot Wheels Extreme Racing (Sony PlayStation, 2001, published by THQ)
- Mobil 1 Rally Championship (Sony PlayStation, 2000, published by Electronic Arts)
- Rally Championship Xtreme (2001-11-02, PC, GameCube, PlayStation 2)
- Jeremy McGrath Supercross '98 (Sony PlayStation, 1998, published by Acclaim)
- HeXen (Sega Saturn, 1996, published by GT Interactive / id Software)
- Bugs Bunny in Double Trouble (Mega Drive and Game Gear, 1996, published by Sega)
- The Pagemaster (Mega Drive, 1994, published by Fox Interactive)
- The Lawnmower Man 3D Subgame (Mega Drive, 1993, published by SCI / Time Warner)
- Edge (Amiga, 1993, published by Inovatronics)
- Troddlers (Amiga / Super NES, 1992 /1993, published by SCI)
- Sankt Thomas (Amiga, 1992, published by Sphinx Software)
- Paramax (Amiga, 1991, published by Kingsoft)
- Intact (Amiga, 1990, published by Sphinx Software)
- Wizmo (Amiga / Atari ST, 1989, published by Kingsoft)
- Hamte Dampte (ZX Spectrum, 1987, published by Firebird)

=== Warthog Sweden/42-Bit AB era ===
- Richard Burns Rally (2004, PC, Xbox, PlayStation 2)
- Mace Griffin Bounty Hunter (2003, PC, Xbox, GameCube, PlayStation 2)
- X2: Wolverine's Revenge (2003, PlayStation 2)
- Starlancer (PC, Dreamcast, 2000–04)
- Pirate Adventure (WAP)
- Aventureland (WAP)
