= 2002 in video games =

The year 2002 in video games saw the release of many sequels and prequels in video games, such as Madden NFL 2003, NBA Live 2003, NBA 2K3, Tony Hawk's Pro Skater 4, WWE SmackDown! Shut Your Mouth, Final Fantasy XI, Grand Theft Auto: Vice City, Jet Set Radio Future, Metroid Prime, Onimusha 2, Pokémon Ruby and Sapphire, Pro Evolution Soccer 2, Resident Evil and Zero, Super Mario Sunshine, The Elder Scrolls III: Morrowind, and The Legend of Zelda: The Wind Waker, along with new titles and franchises such as Battlefield, Dungeon Siege, Kingdom Hearts, Mafia, Ratchet & Clank, Sly Cooper, SOCOM, and Splinter Cell. The year's best-selling video game was Grand Theft Auto: Vice City for the PlayStation 2, while the year's most critically acclaimed titles were Metroid Prime and The Legend of Zelda: The Wind Waker for the GameCube.

== Legend ==
Video game platforms
Arcade	Arcade video game	DC	Dreamcast	GBA	Game Boy Advance, iQue GBA
GBC	Game Boy Color	GCN	GameCube	LIN	Linux, SteamOS
N64	Nintendo 64, iQue Player	OSX	macOS	PS1	PlayStation 1
PS2	PlayStation 2	WIN	Windows, all versions Windows 95 and up	XB	Xbox, Xbox Live Arcade

== Financial performance ==
The market research company NPD estimated that video game hardware, software, and accessories sold about US$10.3 billion in 2002. This was a 10% increase over the 2001 figure.

=== Best-selling games by region ===
Worldwide

Best-selling video games worldwide in 2002
Rank	Title	Platform(s)	Publisher	Sales			
Rank	Title	Platform(s)	Publisher	Japan	USA	Europe	Worldwide
1	Grand Theft Auto: Vice City	PS2	Rockstar	—N/a	4,446,676	1,350,000+	5,796,677+
2	2002 FIFA World Cup		EA Sports	Unknown	331,626	Unknown	3,500,000+
3	Pokémon Ruby / Sapphire	GBA	Nintendo	3,197,762	—N/a	—N/a	3,197,762
4	Madden NFL 2003	PS2, XB, GCN, PS1	EA Sports	Unknown	3,193,545	Unknown	3,194,065+
5	Kingdom Hearts	PS2	Squaresoft	838,323	1,190,152	1,161,677+	3,190,152+
6	FIFA Football 2003		EA Sports	—N/a	261,238	2,500,000+	2,761,238+
7	Grand Theft Auto III	PS2, WIN	Rockstar	—N/a	2,412,997+	300,000+	2,712,997+
8	Pro Evolution Soccer 2 (Winning Eleven 6)	PS2, PS1	Konami	1,693,519	Unknown	1,000,000+	2,693,519+
9	Spider-Man: The Movie	PS2, XB, GCN	Activision	—N/a	1,987,038	300,000+	2,287,038+
10	Super Mario Sunshine	GCN	Nintendo	677,440	1,495,381	175,000+	2,172,821+

Japan

Best-selling video games in Japan in 2002
Rank	Title	Platform(s)	Developer(s)	Publisher	Genre	Sales
1	Pokémon Ruby / Sapphire	GBA	Game Freak	Nintendo	RPG	3,197,762
2	Pro Evolution Soccer 2 (Winning Eleven 6)	PS2, PS1	Konami Tokyo	Konami	Sports	1,693,519
3	Onimusha 2: Samurai's Destiny	PS2	Capcom	Capcom	Hack and slash	1,002,968
4	Kingdom Hearts	PS2	Squaresoft	Squaresoft	Action RPG	838,323
5	Dynasty Warriors 3	PS2	Omega Force	Koei	Hack and slash	688,655
6	Mario Party 4	GCN	Hudson Soft	Nintendo	Party	677,890
7	Super Mario Sunshine	GCN	Nintendo EAD	Nintendo	Platformer	677,440
8	Tales of Destiny 2	PS2	Wolf Team, Telenet	Namco	Action RPG	662,699
9	Super Robot Wars Impact	PS2	TOSE	Banpresto	Tactical RPG	632,536
10	From TV Animation - One Piece: Grand Battle! 2	PS1	Ganbarion	Bandai	Fighting	545,506

United States

Best-selling video games in the United States in 2002 (NPD Group)
Rank	Title	Platform(s)	Publisher	Genre	Sales	Revenue	Inflation
1	Grand Theft Auto: Vice City	PS2	Rockstar	Action-adventure	4,446,676	$218,000,000	$390,000,000
2	Madden NFL 2003	PS2, XB, GCN, PS1	EA Sports	Sports	3,193,545	$150,000,000	$269,000,000
3	Grand Theft Auto III	PS2	Rockstar	Action-adventure	2,412,997+	$121,000,000+	$217,000,000+
4	Spider-Man: The Movie	PS2, XB, GCN	Activision	Action-adventure	1,987,038	$85,000,000	$152,000,000
5	Medal of Honor: Frontline	PS2, XB, GCN	EA Games	FPS	1,829,628	$91,000,000	$163,000,000
6	Super Mario Sunshine	GCN	Nintendo	Platformer	1,495,381	$144,000,000	$258,000,000
7	Super Mario Advance 2: Super Mario World	GBA	Nintendo	Platformer	1,480,275+	$43,000,000+	$77,000,000+
8	Gran Turismo 3: A-Spec	PS2	Sony	Racing sim	1,480,274+	$36,000,000+	$64,000,000+
9	Tony Hawk's Pro Skater 4	PS2, XB, GCN, PS1	Activision	Sports	1,510,226	$69,000,000	$81,000,000
10	NCAA Football 2003	PS2, XB, GCN	EA Sports	Sports	1,197,404	$56,000,000	$100,000,000

Europe

Best-selling video games in Europe in 2002
Title	Platform(s)	Publisher	Sales		
Title	Platform(s)	Publisher	UK	Germany	Europe
FIFA Football 2003		EA Sports	300,000+	Unknown	2,500,000+
Metal Gear Solid 2: Sons of Liberty	PS2	Konami	300,000+	100,000+	1,570,000+
Grand Theft Auto: Vice City	PS2	Rockstar Games	1,250,000+	100,000+	1,350,000+
Kingdom Hearts	PS2	Sony	Unknown	Unknown	1,161,677+
Pro Evolution Soccer 2	PS2	Konami	Unknown	Unknown	1,000,000+
Medal of Honor: Frontline		EA Games	300,000+	100,000+	400,000+
Grand Theft Auto III	PS2, WIN	Rockstar Games	300,000+	Unknown	300,000+
Harry Potter and the Chamber of Secrets		EA Games	300,000+	Unknown	300,000+
The Lord of the Rings: The Two Towers		EA Games	300,000+	Unknown	300,000+
Gran Turismo 3: A-Spec	PS2	Sony	300,000+	Unknown	300,000+

United Kingdom

Best-selling video games in the United Kingdom
Rank	Title	Platform(s)	Publisher	Sales
1	Grand Theft Auto: Vice City	PS2	Rockstar Games	1,250,000+
2	FIFA Football 2003		EA Sports	300,000+
3	Grand Theft Auto III	PS2, WIN	Rockstar Games	300,000+
4	Harry Potter and the Chamber of Secrets		EA Games	300,000+
5	Medal of Honor: Frontline		EA Games	300,000+
6	The Lord of the Rings: The Two Towers		EA Games	300,000+
7	Metal Gear Solid 2: Sons of Liberty	PS2	Konami	300,000+
8	Gran Turismo 3: A-Spec	PS2	Sony	300,000+
9	Spider-Man: The Movie		Activision	300,000+
10	Monsters, Inc.	GBA, GBC	THQ	300,000+

Australia

Best-selling video games in Australia in 2002
Rank	Title	Platform	Publisher
1	Tony Hawk's Pro Skater 3	PS2	Activision
2	Gran Turismo 3: A-Spec	PS2	Sony
3	V8 Supercars: Race Driver	PS2	Codemasters
4	Gran Turismo 3	PS2	Sony
5	Medal of Honor: Frontline	PS2	Electronic Arts
6	Halo: Combat Evolved	XB	Microsoft
7	Grand Theft Auto: Vice City	PS2	Rockstar
8	Harry Potter and the Chamber of Secrets	PS1	Electronic Arts
9	Grand Theft Auto III	PS2	Rockstar
10	Gran Turismo 2	PS1	Sony

=== Best-selling games per platform by region ===
Germany

Best-selling PS2 video games in Germany in 2002
Title	Publisher	Sales
Final Fantasy X	Sony	100,000+
Grand Theft Auto: Vice City	Rockstar Games	100,000+
Medal of Honor: Frontline	EA Games	100,000+
Metal Gear Solid 2: Sons of Liberty	Konami	100,000+

== Top-rated games ==
=== Critically acclaimed games ===
Famitsu

The following video game releases in 2002 entered Famitsu magazine's "Platinum Hall of Fame" and received Famitsu scores of at least 36 out of 40.

Title	Platform	Developer	Publisher	Genre	Score (out of 40)
The Legend of Zelda: The Wind Waker	GCN	Nintendo EAD	Nintendo	Action-adventure	40
Resident Evil	GCN	Capcom	Capcom	Survival horror	39
Final Fantasy XI Online	PS2	Squaresoft	Squaresoft	MMORPG	38
Resident Evil Zero	GCN	Capcom	Capcom	Survival horror	38
Virtua Fighter 4	PS2	Sega AM2	Sega	Fighting	37
Dead or Alive 3	XB	Team Ninja	Tecmo	Fighting	37
Super Mario Sunshine	GCN	Nintendo EAD	Nintendo	Platformer	37
Onimusha 2: Samurai's Destiny	PS2	Capcom	Capcom	Hack and slash	36
Sakura Wars 4: Fall in Love, Maidens	DC	Red Company	Sega	Tactical RPG	36
Kingdom Hearts	PS2	Squaresoft	Squaresoft	Action RPG	36
Tekken 4	PS2	Namco	Namco	Fighting	36
Fire Emblem: The Binding Blade	GBA	Intelligent Systems	Nintendo	Tactical RPG	36
Pro Evolution Soccer 2 (Winning Eleven 6)	PS2	Konami Tokyo	Konami	Sports	36
Kamaitachi no Yoru 2	PS2	Chunsoft	Chunsoft	Visual novel	36
Ikaruga	DC	Treasure	ESP	Shoot 'em up	36
Winning Eleven 6: Final Evolution	PS2	Konami Tokyo	Konami	Sports	36

Metacritic and GameRankings

Metacritic (MC) and GameRankings (GR) are aggregators of video game journalism reviews.

2002 games and expansions scoring at least 88/100 (MC) or 88% (GR)
Game	Publisher	Release Date	Platform(s)	MC score	GR score
Metroid Prime	Nintendo	November 17, 2002	GCN	97/100	96.33%
The Legend of Zelda: The Wind Waker	Nintendo	December 13, 2002	GCN	96/100	94.43%
Grand Theft Auto: Vice City	Rockstar Games	October 29, 2002	PS2	95/100	94.43%
The Legend of Zelda: A Link to the Past and Four Swords	Nintendo	December 2, 2002	GBA	95/100	91.74%
Madden NFL 2003	EA Sports	August 12, 2002	PS2	95/100	91.2%
Tony Hawk's Pro Skater 4	Activision	October 23, 2002	PS2	94/100	92.53%
Virtua Fighter 4	Sega	January 31, 2002	PS2	94/100	91.33%
Grand Theft Auto III	Rockstar Games	May 21, 2002	WIN	93/100	93.54%
Warcraft III: Reign of Chaos	Blizzard Entertainment	July 3, 2002	WIN	92/100	93.02%
Tom Clancy's Splinter Cell	Ubisoft	November 17, 2002	XB	93/100	92.49%
Tony Hawk's Pro Skater 3	Activision	March 4, 2002	XB	93/100	90.69%
Pro Evolution Soccer 2	Konami	April 25, 2002	PS2	93/100	90.54%
NFL 2K3	Sega	August 21, 2002	PS2	93/100	88.1%
Super Mario Sunshine	Nintendo	August 26, 2002	GCN	92/100	91.5%
Metroid Fusion	Nintendo	November 18, 2002	GBA	92/100	91.21%
Eternal Darkness	Nintendo	June 23, 2002	GCN	92/100	90.58%
Madden NFL 2003	EA Sports	August 12, 2002	GCN	92/100	90.47%
Tiger Woods PGA Tour 2003	EA Sports	October 31, 2002	WIN	92/100	89.83%
Madden NFL 2003	EA Sports	August 12, 2002	XB	92/100	89.57%
NFL 2K3	Sega	August 21, 2002	GCN	92/100	89.45%
TimeSplitters 2	Eidos Interactive	October 8, 2002	PS2	90/100	91.67%
NCAA Football 2003	EA Sports	July 20, 2002	PS2	91/100	91.36%
Medal of Honor: Allied Assault	Electronic Arts	January 22, 2002	WIN	91/100	91.05%
No One Lives Forever 2: A Spy in H.A.R.M.'s Way	Sierra Entertainment	September 30, 2002	WIN	91/100	91.03%
NCAA Football 2003	EA Sports	July 20, 2002	GCN	91/100	90.57%
The Legend of Zelda: Ocarina of Time / Master Quest	Nintendo	December 13, 2002	GCN	91/100	89.77%
Resident Evil	Capcom	March 22, 2002	GCN	91/100	89.75%
Yoshi's Island: Super Mario Advance 3	Nintendo	September 24, 2002	GBA	91/100	89.55%
Tony Hawk's Pro Skater 4	Activision	October 23, 2002	GCN	91/100	89.39%
Neverwinter Nights	Infogrames	June 18, 2002	WIN	91/100	88.98%
Tiger Woods PGA Tour 2003	EA Sports	October 27, 2002	GCN	90/100	90.55%
NBA 2K2	Sega	March 20, 2002	GCN	90/100	90.53%
Panzer Dragoon Orta	Sega	December 19, 2002	XB	90/100	90.36%
Tony Hawk's Pro Skater 3	Activision	March 28, 2002	WIN	90/100	90.29%
Tony Hawk's Pro Skater 4	Activision	October 23, 2002	XB	90/100	88.79%
NCAA Football 2003	EA Sports	July 20, 2002	XB	90/100	88.79%
Tony Hawk's Pro Skater 3	Activision	March 4, 2002	GBA	90/100	88.33%
Freedom Force	Electronic Arts	March 26, 2002	WIN	90/100	87.88%
NBA 2K2	Sega	February 27, 2002	XB	90/100	86.91%
NFL 2K3	Sega	August 21, 2002	XB	N/A	89.79%
Ratchet & Clank	Sony Computer Entertainment	November 4, 2002	PS2	88/100	89.74%
Mafia	Gathering of Developers	August 27, 2002	WIN	88/100	89.51%
TimeSplitters 2	Eidos Interactive	October 16, 2002	GCN	88/100	89.31%
The Elder Scrolls III: Morrowind	Bethesda Softworks	May 1, 2002	WIN	89/100	89.01%
NBA 2K2	Sega	January 12, 2002	PS2	89/100	88.89%
Battlefield 1942	Electronic Arts	September 10, 2002	WIN	89/100	88.67%
Age of Mythology	Microsoft Game Studios	October 30, 2002	WIN	89/100	88.67%
Need for Speed: Hot Pursuit 2	Electronic Arts	October 2, 2002	PS2	89/100	88.01%
Madden NFL 2003	EA Sports	August 12, 2002	WIN	89/100	87.64%
Combat Mission II: Barbarossa to Berlin	Battlefront.com	September 20, 2002	WIN	89/100	87.18%
NHL 2K3	Sega	November 19, 2002	XB	89/100	86.86%
Star Wars Jedi Knight II: Jedi Outcast	Activision	March 26, 2002	WIN	89/100	86.8%
NASCAR Racing 2002 Season	Sierra Entertainment	February 14, 2002	WIN	89/100	86.7%
NHL 2K3	Sega	December 11, 2002	GCN	89/100	86.12%
NBA 2K3	Sega	October 8, 2002	PS2	89/100	85.81%
NHL 2K3	Sega	November 10, 2002	PS2	89/100	85.81%
Medieval: Total War	Activision	August 19, 2002	WIN	88/100	88.49%
Dark Chronicle	Sony Computer Entertainment	November 28, 2002	PS2	87/100	88.46%
Tiger Woods PGA Tour 2003	EA Sports	October 27, 2002	XB	88/100	88.28%
Burnout 2: Point of Impact	Acclaim Entertainment	September 30, 2002	PS2	86/100	88.22%
TimeSplitters 2	Eidos Interactive	October 16, 2002	XB	88/100	88.12%
Tiger Woods PGA Tour 2003	EA Sports	October 27, 2002	PS2	88/100	87.9%
F1 2002	EA Sports	June 13, 2002	WIN	88/100	86.93%
Medal of Honor: Frontline	Electronic Arts	May 29, 2002	PS2	88/100	86.67%
Aggressive Inline	Acclaim Entertainment	July 31, 2002	GCN	88/100	86.47%
FIFA Football 2003	Electronic Arts	November 1, 2002	XB	88/100	86.33%
Jet Set Radio Future	Sega	February 22, 2002	XB	88/100	85.97%
NBA Street	EA Sports	February 5, 2002	GCN	88/100	84.96%
FIFA Football 2003	Electronic Arts	October 25, 2002	PS2	88/100	82.9%

== Major events ==
Date	Event	Ref.
March 22	The Sims overtakes Myst as all-time best-selling computer game, having sold 6.3 million units.	
March 25	GameTrailers, an American video gaming website is launched.	
April 24	G4 Media, LLC (subsidiary of Comcast Corporation) launches the G4 cable television video game network channel.	
May 14	Virgin Interactive España is split up from its parent Titus Software and renames to Virgin Play, becoming the first "100% Spanish" game distributor and publisher.	
May 22–24	8th annual E3 (Electronic Entertainment Expo); the 5th annual Game Critics Awards for the Best of E3.	
July 29	Greece passed Law 3037/2002 which outlawed electronic games being played in public in attempt to fight illegal gambling in the country. The controversial law was repealed in 2011.	
July	IEMA (Interactive Entertainment Merchants Association) hosts 3rd annual Executive Summit.	
September 24	Microsoft purchases Rare for $375 million.	
October 28-November 3	The 2002 World Cyber Games are held.	
Unknown	Academy of Interactive Arts & Sciences hosts the 5th Annual Interactive Achievement Awards; inducts Will Wright of Maxis to the AIAS Hall of Fame.	
Unknown	BAFTA (British Academy of Film and Television Arts) holds 5th annual BAFTA Interactive Entertainment Awards for multimedia technologies; 10 of 21 awards go to video games; awards Ian Livingstone the BAFTA Interactive Special Award.	
Unknown	Big Fish Games is founded with Paul Thelen as the only employee.	
Unknown	Eidos Interactive selects Dutch model Jill De Jong as the new digitized Lara Croft character.	
Unknown	Gama Network hosts the 4th annual Independent Games Festival (IGF).	
Unknown	Game Developers Conference hosts the 2nd annual Game Developers Choice Awards.	
Unknown	SEGA establishes the Sega Mobile division to develop, produce, and distribute video games for mobile phones and PDAs; establishes the Sega.com Business Solutions division to service video game developers and publishers.	
Unknown	Rockstar Games embroiled in controversy for its Grand Theft Auto III and Grand Theft Auto: Vice City video games.	
Unknown	Titus Software buys out Interplay Entertainment's European operations, owning the rights to publish their games in Europe and also owning 100% of Virgin Interactive. They also buy a majority stake in Interplay.	

== Hardware releases ==
This is a list of all game hardware released in 2002.

The GameCube and Xbox continued to release in European & Australian countries (and Japan for the latter console), and the PlayStation 2 released in Russia and some East Asian countries.

Date	Console	Ref.
January 24	PlayStation 2^{TW}	
February 22	PlayStation 2^{KR}	
February 22	Xbox^{JP}	
March 14	Xbox^{PAL}	
May 3	GameCube^{EU}	
May 17	GameCube^{AU}	
November 7	PlayStation 2^{RUS}	

== Games released in 2002 ==
Release date	Title	Platform	Genre	Developer	Publisher	Ref.
January 7	Rez	PS2				
January 12	NBA 2K2	PS2				
January 12	NBA Courtside 2002	GCN				
January 14	ESPN Winter X-Games Snowboarding 2002	PS2				
January 15	Mobile Suit Gundam: Zeonic Front	PS2				
January 18	Dark Arena	GBA				
January 19	Salt Lake 2002	GBA				
January 22	Forever Kingdom	PS2				
January 22	Medal of Honor: Allied Assault	WIN				
January 22	MotoGP 2	PS2				
January 23	PaRappa the Rapper 2	PS2				
January 24	Disciples II: Dark Prophecy	WIN				
January 24	Salt Lake 2002	WIN				
January 25	Tomato Adventure	GBA				
January 28	AirBlade	PS2				
January 28	Drakan: The Ancients' Gates	PS2				
January 28	ESPN International Winter Sports 2002	PS2				
January 28	Grandia II	PS2				
January 29	Salt Lake 2002	PS2				
February 1	Serious Sam: The Second Encounter	WIN				
February 3	Sonic Advance	GBA				
February 4	Wreckless: The Yakuza Missions	XB				
February 6	NFL Blitz 20-02	PS2				
February 9	High Heat Major League Baseball 2003	PS2				
February 9	Super Mario Advance 2: Super Mario World	GBA				
February 11	Maximo: Ghosts to Glory	PS2				
February 11	Sonic Adventure 2: Battle	GCN				
February 11	Star Wars: Racer Revenge	PS2				
February 12	State of Emergency	PS2				
February 12	Zone of the Enders: The Fist of Mars	GBA				
February 14	NHL 2K2	DC				
February 17	Pirates: The Legend of Black Kat	PS2, XB				
February 17	UFC: Tapout	XB				
February 19	Gitaroo Man	PS2				
February 19	Woody Woodpecker: Escape from Buzz Buzzard Park	PS2				
February 22	Jet Set Radio Future	XB				
February 24	Circus Maximus: Chariot Wars	PS2				
February 24	Tiger Woods PGA Tour 2002	PS2				
February 25	Crash Bandicoot: The Huge Adventure	GBA				
February 25	ESPN NBA 2Night 2002	PS2				
February 26	All-Star Baseball 2003	PS2				
February 26	Command & Conquer: Renegade	WIN				
February 26	EOE: Eve of Extinction	PS2				
February 26	Pac-Man World 2	PS2				
March 2	Shadow Man: 2econd Coming	PS2				
March 3	Ecco the Dolphin: Defender of the Future	PS2				
March 4	Fatal Frame	PS2				
March 4	Herdy Gerdy	PS2				
March 4	Knockout Kings 2002	PS2				
March 4	Tony Hawk's Pro Skater 3	XB, GBA				
March 5	High Heat Major League Baseball 2003	GBA				
March 10	Grandia II	WIN				
March 10	Star Wars: Jedi Starfighter	PS2				
March 11	Hot Shots Golf 3	PS2				
March 11	Sled Storm	PS2				
March 11	Triple Play 2002	PS2				
March 12	007: Agent Under Fire	GCN				
March 12	Mad Maestro!	PS2				
March 12	Mister Mosquito	PS2				
March 12	Pac-Man World 2	GCN				
March 13	Star Wars: Jedi Starfighter	XB				
March 17	Broken Sword: The Shadow of the Templars	GBA				
March 17	Virtua Fighter 4	PS2				
March 18	Sega Soccer Slam	GCN				
March 19	Bloody Roar 3	GCN				
March 19	Monsters, Inc.	PS2				
March 20	Baseball Advance	GBA				
March 20	Smash Court Tennis Pro Tournament	PS2				
March 21	Blood Omen 2	PS2				
March 21	World Rally Championship	PS2				
March 25	007: Agent Under Fire	XB				
March 25	Britney's Dance Beat	GBA				
March 25	Deus Ex: The Conspiracy	PS2				
March 25	Hooters Road Trip	PS1				
March 25	King's Field: The Ancient City	PS2				
March 26	Freedom Force	WIN				
March 26	Star Wars Jedi Knight II: Jedi Outcast	WIN				
March 27	Army Men: RTS	PS2				
March 27	ESPN MLS ExtraTime 2002	XB				
March 31	Dungeon Siege	WIN				
March 31	Savage Skies	PS2				
March 31	The Scorpion King: Sword of Osiris	GBA				
April 12	Evil Twin: Cyprien's Chronicles (PAL/EU)	DC				
April 15	Blender Bros.	GBA				
April 15	Breath of Fire II	GBA				
April 15	Spider-Man: The Movie	PS2				
April 16	The Operative: No One Lives Forever	PS2				
April 16	RedCard 20-03	PS2				
April 16	Spider-Man: The Movie	GBA				
April 20	Vendetta Online	WIN, OSX, LIN				
April 22	2002 FIFA World Cup	PS2				
April 30	2002 FIFA World Cup	GCN				
April 30	Dinotopia: The Timestone Paradise	GBA				
April 30	Resident Evil Remake	GCN				
April 30	TransWorld Surf	PS2				
May 1	The Elder Scrolls III: Morrowind	WIN				
May 7	Tactics Ogre: The Knight of Lodis	GBA				
May 8	Britney's Dance Beat	PS2				
May 9	Headhunter	PS2				
May 14	Dragon Ball Z: The Legacy of Goku	GBA				
May 16	Final Fantasy XI (JP)	PS2				
May 20	Scooby-Doo! Night of 100 Frights	PS2				
May 20	Soldier of Fortune II: Double Helix	WIN				
May 21	Grand Theft Auto III	WIN				
May 24	Super Smash Bros. Melee (PAL)	GCN				
May 27	Looney Tunes: Space Race	PS2				
May 27	Lost Kingdoms	GCN				
May 27	Test Drive	PS2				
May 28	Aggressive Inline	PS2				
May 29	Dropship: United Peace Force	PS2				
May 29	Hey Arnold! The Movie	GBA				
May 29	Medal of Honor: Frontline	PS2				
May 29	Muppet Pinball Mayhem	GBA				
May 30	Star Wars Episode II: Attack of the Clones	GBA				
May 31	Earthworm Jim 2	GBA				
May 31	Lethal Skies Elite Pilot: Team SW	PS2				
May 31	Way of the Samurai	PS2				
May 31	WTA Tour Tennis	GBA				
June 1	The House of the Dead III	Arcade				
June 3	Dead to Rights	XB				
June 3	Endgame	PS2				
June 3	Ultimate Fighting Championship: Throwdown	PS2				
June 5	Digimon World 3	PS1				
June 6	The Elder Scrolls III: Morrowind	XB				
June 7	Disney's Lilo & Stitch	GBA				
June 10	Outlaw Golf	XB				
June 10	WWE WrestleMania X8 (video game)	GCN				
June 12	Mega Man Battle Network 2	GBA				
June 14	Disney's Lilo & Stitch	PS1				
June 14	Downforce	PS2				
June 14	Global Touring Challenge: Africa	PS2				
June 14	Lilo & Stitch: Trouble in Paradise	WIN				
June 14	NickToons Racing	GBA				
June 16	Fire Blade	PS2				
June 16	Neverwinter Nights	WIN				
June 16	The Pinball of the Dead	GBA				
June 18	F1 2002	PS2				
June 18	Freekstyle	PS2				
June 18	Legion: The Legend of Excalibur	PS2				
June 18	Lego Soccer Mania	PS2, GBA				
June 18	MX Superfly	PS2				
June 18	Shifters	PS2				
June 18	Wipeout Fusion	PS2				
June 19	Britney's Dance Beat	WIN				
June 19	Disney's Stitch: Experiment 626	PS2				
June 22	Shantae	GBC				
June 23	Eternal Darkness	GCN				
June 23	Mike Tyson Heavyweight Boxing	PS2				
June 23	MLB Slugfest 20-03	PS2				
June 23	Stuntman	PS2				
June 24	Barbarian	PS2				
June 24	SkyGunner	PS2				
June 27	Gravity Games Bike: Street Vert Dirt	PS2				
June 27	Men in Black II: Alien Escape	PS2				
July 2	Bruce Lee: Quest of the Dragon	XB				
July 3	Warcraft III: Reign of Chaos	WIN				
July 20	NCAA Football 2003	PS2				
July 22	Smuggler's Run	GBA				
July 29	The Mark of Kri	PS2				
July 29	UFC: Throwdown	GCN				
July 30	Car Battler Joe	GBA				
July 30	Virtua Tennis 2	PS2				
July 31	Sega Sports Tennis	PS2				
August 11	Embodiment of Scarlet Devil	WIN				
August 12	Beach Spikers	GCN				
August 12	Duke Nukem Advance	GBA				
August 12	Madden NFL 2003	PS2				
August 12	Mat Hoffman's Pro BMX 2	PS2				
August 12	Nancy Drew: Secret of the Scarlet Hand	WIN				
August 12	NFL 2K3	PS2				
August 12	NFL Blitz 20-03	PS2				
August 12	NFL GameDay 2003	PS2				
August 12	Street Hoops	PS2				
August 14	NCAA GameBreaker 2003	PS2				
August 18	Buffy the Vampire Slayer	XB				
August 20	Medieval: Total War	WIN				
August 20	The Thing	WIN				
August 20	Tony Hawk's Pro Skater 3	N64				
August 22	Monster Force	GBA				
August 22	Sega Soccer Slam	XB				
August 23	TOCA Race Driver	PS2				
August 25	Super Monkey Ball 2	GCN				
August 26	Super Mario Sunshine	GCN				
August 27	Icewind Dale II	WIN				
August 27	SOCOM U.S. Navy SEALs	PS2				
August 27	Twisted Metal: Black Online	PS2				
August 28	Commandos 2: Men of Courage	PS2				
August 28	Mafia: The City of Lost Heaven	WIN				
August 28	Onimusha 2: Samurai's Destiny	PS2				
August 31	Riding Spirits	PS2				
August 31	Turok: Evolution	PS2				
September 2	Blade II	PS2				
September 3	The Thing	XB				
September 4	Gravity Games Bike: Street Vert Dirt	XB				
September 5	Armored Core 3	PS2				
September 9	Dino Stalker	PS2				
September 10	Battlefield 1942	WIN				
September 10	Mega Man Zero	GBA				
September 10	The Scorpion King: Rise of the Akkadian	PS2				
September 10	The Thing	PS2				
September 10	Ty the Tasmanian Tiger	GCN, PS2, XB				
September 14	Disney's Tarzan: Return to the Jungle	GBA				
September 14	Monsters, Inc. Scream Arena	GCN				
September 14	Turbo Turtle Adventure	GBA				
September 15	Animal Crossing	GCN				
September 16	Boulder Dash EX	GBA				
September 16	Castlevania: Harmony of Dissonance	GBA				
September 16	Colin McRae Rally 2.0	GBA				
September 16	Gungrave	PS2				
September 16	Kelly Slater's Pro Surfer	PS2				
September 16	NHL Hitz 20-03	PS2				
September 16	The Terminator: Dawn of Fate	PS2				
September 17	Crash Bandicoot: The Wrath of Cortex	GCN				
September 17	Dynasty Tactics	PS2				
September 17	Kingdom Hearts	PS2				
September 17	Taz: Wanted	PS2				
September 18	NASCAR Thunder 2003	PS1, PS2, XB				
September 18	Taz: Wanted	XB				
September 20	Rocket Power: Beach Bandits	PS2				
September 22	Divine Divinity	WIN				
September 23	Dual Hearts	PS2				
September 23	Sly Cooper and the Thievius Raccoonus	PS2				
September 23	Star Fox Adventures	GCN				
September 23	Summoner 2	PS2				
September 23	Tekken 4	PS2				
September 23	Tribes: Aerial Assault	PS2				
September 24	The Lord of the Rings:The Fellowship of the Ring	XB, GBA				
September 24	NASCAR Thunder 2003	GCN				
September 24	Rocket Power: Beach Bandits	GCN				
September 24	Super Bust-A-Move 2	PS2				
September 24	Super Mario Advance 3: Yoshi's Island	GBA				
September 25	Jimmy Neutron vs. Jimmy Negatron	GBA				
September 25	NBA ShootOut 2003	PS2				
September 25	Robotech: Battlecry	PS2				
September 25	Spyro 2: Season of Flame	GBA				
September 25	Stronghold: Crusader	WIN				
September 25	Superman: Shadow of Apokolips	PS2				
September 27	RLH: Run Like Hell	PS2				
September 28	Ferrari F355 Challenge	PS2				
September 30	Burnout 2: Point of Impact	PS2				
September 30	Conflict: Desert Storm	PS2				
September 30	Grandia Xtreme	PS2				
September 30	Mystic Heroes	GCN				
September 30	NHL 2003	PS2				
September 30	No One Lives Forever 2: A Spy In H.A.R.M.'s Way	WIN				
September 30	Unreal Tournament 2003	WIN				
October 1	Hitman 2: Silent Assassin	WIN, PS2, XB				
October 1	Legaia 2: Duel Saga	PS2				
October 1	Need For Speed: Hot Pursuit 2	WIN, PS2, XB, GCN				
October 1	Taz: Wanted	WIN				
October 4	Super Mario Sunshine (PAL)	GCN				
October 4	Taz: Wanted	GCN				
October 7	David Beckham Soccer	GBA				
October 7	Dual Blades	GBA				
October 8	Godzilla: Destroy All Monsters Melee	GCN				
October 8	Lilo & Stitch Pinball	WIN				
October 8	NBA 2K3	PS2				
October 8	NBA Live 2003	PS2				
October 8	Virtua Tennis	GBA				
October 9	Evolution Skateboarding	PS2				
October 9	TimeSplitters 2	PS2				
October 10	Shrek: Hassle at the Castle	GBA				
October 12	Sub Rebellion	PS2				
October 15	BloodRayne	PS2				
October 15	Casper: Spirit Dimensions	GCN				
October 15	The Lord of the Rings:The Fellowship of the Ring	PS2				
October 15	Pac-Man World 2	XB				
October 15	Red Faction II	PS2				
October 15	RollerCoaster Tycoon 2	WIN				
October 15	Wild Arms 3	PS2				
October 15	X-Men: Next Dimension	PS2				
October 17	Disney Golf	PS2				
October 18	Shrek: Treasure Hunt	PS1				
October 21	The Lord of the Rings: The Two Towers	PS2				
October 21	Mario Party 4	GCN				
October 22	Baldur's Gate: Dark Alliance	XB				
October 22	Contra: Shattered Soldier	PS2				
October 22	Deathrow	XB				
October 22	Defender	PS2				
October 22	The Lord of the Rings:The Fellowship of the Ring	WIN				
October 22	Reign of Fire	PS2, XB, GCN				
October 22	Sneakers	XB				
October 22	V-Rally 3	PS2				
October 23	Fire Pro Wrestling 2	GBA				
October 23	Tony Hawk's Pro Skater 4	PS2				
October 24	Suikoden III	PS2				
October 25	Austin Powers Pinball	PS1				
October 27	Grand Theft Auto: Vice City	PS2				
October 27	Tiger Woods PGA Tour 2003	PS2				
October 27	Toxic Grind	XB				
October 28	DDRMAX: Dance Dance Revolution	PS2				
October 28	Doom II: Hell on Earth	GBA				
October 28	Hamtaro: Ham-Hams Unite!	GBC				
October 28	Jet X2O	PS2				
October 28	Star Wars: The Clone Wars	PS2, XB, GCN				
October 28	Tony Hawk's Pro Skater 4	GBA				
October 29	Dexter's Laboratory: Chess Challenge	GBA				
October 29	Phantasy Star Online Episode I & II	GCN				
October 30	Neocron	WIN				
October 31	Final Fantasy Origins	PS1	Role-playing	Squaresoft	Square	
October 31	Reign of Fire	GBA				
October 31	WWE SmackDown! Shut Your Mouth	PS2				
November 1	Age of Mythology	WIN				
November 1	Bionicle: Matoran Adventures	GBA				
November 1	Disney's PK: Out of the Shadows	PS2				
November 1	Nancy Drew: Ghost Dogs of Moon Lake	WIN				
November 3	Contra Advance: The Alien Wars EX	GBA				
November 3	Spyro: Enter the Dragonfly	PS2, GCN				
November 4	The Fairly OddParents: Enter the Cleft	GBA				
November 4	Metal Gear Solid 2: Substance	XB				
November 4	Phantom Crash	XB				
November 4	Ratchet & Clank	PS2				
November 4	Robot Alchemic Drive	PS2				
November 5	NHL FaceOff 2003	PS2				
November 5	Project Nomads	WIN				
November 5	Zapper: One Wicked Cricket	WIN, PS2, XB, GCN, GBA				
November 6	The Elder Scrolls III: Tribunal	WIN				
November 7	Medal of Honor: Frontline	XB, GCN				
November 8	The Lord of the Rings: The Two Towers	GBA				
November 8	Rugrats: I Gotta Go Party	GBA				
November 9	ATV Offroad Fury 2	PS2				
November 10	NHL 2K3	PS2				
November 10	Shinobi	PS2				
November 10	Sonic Mega Collection	GCN				
November 11	Disney's Treasure Planet	PS2				
November 11	Godzilla: Domination!	GBA				
November 11	Hot Wheels: Velocity X	PS2				
November 11	Kakuto Chojin: Back Alley Brutal	XB				
November 11	MechAssault	XB				
November 11	Rally Fusion: Race of Champions	PS2				
November 11	The Simpsons Skateboarding	PS2				
November 12	Resident Evil 0	GCN				
November 12	Tomb Raider: The Prophecy	GBA				
November 12	Whirl Tour	GCN				
November 13	Wreckless: The Yakuza Missions	GCN, PS2				
November 14	FIFA Soccer 2003	PS2				
November 14	Star Wars: The New Droid Army	GBA				
November 15	Disney Sports Skateboarding	GBA				
November 15	Harry Potter and the Chamber of Secrets	WIN, PS1, PS2, XB, GCN, GBC, GBA				
November 15	Metroid Fusion	GBA				
November 15	Metroid Prime	GCN				
November 16	BMX XXX	PS2				
November 16	Mortal Kombat: Deadly Alliance	PS2				
November 17	Haven: Call of the King	PS2				
November 17	Justice League: Injustice For All	GBA				
November 17	Mortal Kombat: Deadly Alliance	GCN				
November 18	Baldur's Gate: Dark Alliance	GCN				
November 18	Dead to Rights	PS2				
November 18	James Cameron's Dark Angel	PS2				
November 18	Marvel vs. Capcom 2	PS2				
November 18	Mortal Kombat: Deadly Alliance	XB				
November 18	Ninja Assault	PS2				
November 18	Rocky	PS2				
November 18	Tom Clancy's Splinter Cell	XB				
November 19	007: Nightfire	PS2, GCN				
November 19	Activision Anthology	PS2				
November 19	Dr. Muto	PS2				
November 19	FIFA Football 2003	GBA				
November 19	Minority Report: Everybody Runs	GCN, PS2, XB				
November 19	Shox	PS2				
November 19	Star Wars Jedi Knight II: Jedi Outcast	GCN, XB				
November 19	Star Wars: Bounty Hunter	PS2				
November 19	Super Monkey Ball Jr.	GBA				
November 20	007: Nightfire	XB				
November 20	Mortal Kombat: Deadly Alliance	GBA				
November 21	Karnaaj Rally	GBA				
November 21	Pokémon Ruby and Sapphire (JP)	GBA				
November 21	Steel Battalion	XB				
November 22	Disney's Kim Possible: Revenge of Monkey Fist	GBA				
November 22	Fatal Frame	XB				
November 24	BMX XXX	GCN				
November 24	Phantasy Star Collection	GBA				
November 25	Gauntlet: Dark Legacy	GBA				
November 25	Legends of Wrestling II	GBA				
November 25	Rygar: The Legendary Adventure	PS2				
November 26	Dave Mirra Freestyle BMX 3	GBA				
November 26	Legends of Wrestling II	PS2				
November 27	Gremlins: Stripe vs Gizmo	GBA				
November 27	NCAA Final Four 2003	PS2				
November 28	007: Nightfire	WIN				
November 28	Dark Chronicle	PS2				
November 28	Space Channel 5 Part 2 (PAL)	PS2				
December 1	Street Fighter Alpha 3	GBA				
December 1	Tom Clancy's Ghost Recon	PS2				
December 2	Shadow of Memories (USA)	WIN				
December 3	Dragon Ball Z: Budokai	PS2				
December 3	The Legend of Zelda: A Link to the Past	GBA				
December 6	Nickelodeon Party Blast	PS2				
December 6	Pro Race Driver	PS2				
December 7	Star Wars: Bounty Hunter	GCN				
December 10	Frogger Beyond	GCN, XB				
December 10	Lunar Legend	GBA				
December 10	Star Wars: The Clone Wars	PS2				
December 13	The Legend of Zelda: The Wind Waker (JP)	GCN				
December 15	The Invincible Iron Man	GBA				
December 19	Sonic Advance 2	GBA				
December 29	Sherlock Holmes: The Mystery of the Mummy	WIN				
December 30	The Lord of the Rings: The Two Towers	XB				
December 31	The Lord of the Rings: The Two Towers	GCN				

== See also ==
- 2002 in games
