= D.I.C.E. Award for Sports Game of the Year =

Annual award presented by the Academy of Interactive Arts & Sciences

- Country: United States
- Presented by: Academy of Interactive Arts & Sciences
- First award: 1998
- Currently held by: Rematch
- Website: www.interactive.org

The D.I.C.E. Award for Sports Game of the Year is an award presented annually by the Academy of Interactive Arts & Sciences during the D.I.C.E. Awards. This award recognizes games that "offer the user the opportunity to virtually reproduce a sporting experience: either a realistic portrayal of an actual sport or games that reproduce for the user experience of participating in an existing competitive sport". All active creative/technical, business, and affiliate members of the Academy are qualified to vote for this category. The award initially had separate awards for console games and computer games at the 1st Annual Interactive Achievement Awards in 1998, with the first winners being International Superstar Soccer 64 for console and FIFA: Road to World Cup 98 for computer. There have been numerous mergers and additions of sports-related games during the early years of the annual awards ceremony. The current version was established in 2006, with its winner being SSX on Tour.

The award's most recent winner is Rematch, developed by Slocap and published by Kepler Interactive.

== History ==
Initially the Interactive Achievement Awards had separate awards for Console Sports Game of the Year and Computer Sports Game of the Year. In 2004, there were separate console categories for Action Sports and Sports Simulation. In 2006, all sports categories would be merged together as part of a single Sports Game of the Year, which has been used ever since.

- Console Sports Game of the Year (1998—2003)
- Computer Sports Game of the Year (1998—2005)
- Console Action Sports Game of the Year (2004—2005)
- Console Sports Simulation Game of the Year (2004—2005)
- Sports Game of the Year (2006—present)

There was a tie between FIFA 2001 and Motocross Madness 2 for PC Sports Game of the Year at the 2001 Awards.

== Winners and nominees ==
=== 1990s ===
Table key
Indicates the winner

Year	Game	Developer(s)	Publisher(s)	Ref.
1997/1998 (1st)	Console Sports Game of the Year			
1997/1998 (1st)	International Superstar Soccer 64	Konami	Konami	
1997/1998 (1st)	NASCAR 98	Stormfront Studios	EA Sports	
1997/1998 (1st)	NBA Live 98	EA Canada	EA Sports	
1997/1998 (1st)	NFL GameDay 98	Sony Interactive Studios America	Sony Computer Entertainment	
1997/1998 (1st)	NFL Quarterback Club 98	Iguana Entertainment	Acclaim Entertainment	
1997/1998 (1st)	World Series Baseball '98	Sega	Sega	
1997/1998 (1st)	Computer Sports Game of the Year			
1997/1998 (1st)	FIFA: Road to World Cup 98	EA Canada	EA Sports	
1997/1998 (1st)	Links LS 1998	Access Software	Access Software	
1997/1998 (1st)	NBA Action 98	Visual Concepts	Sega	
1997/1998 (1st)	NHL 98	EA Canada	EA Sports	
1997/1998 (1st)	Virtual Pool 2	Celeris	VR Sports	
1997/1998 (1st)	Warlords III: Reign of Heroes	Strategic Studies Group	Red Orb Entertainment	
1998/1999 (2nd)	Console Sports Game of the Year			
1998/1999 (2nd)	1080° Snowboarding	Nintendo EAD	Nintendo	
1998/1999 (2nd)	Hot Shot Golf	Camelot Software Planning	Sony Computer Entertainment	
1998/1999 (2nd)	Kobe Bryant in NBA Courtside	Left Field Productions	Nintendo	
1998/1999 (2nd)	NFL Blitz	Midway Games	Midway Games	
1998/1999 (2nd)	NFL Quarterback Club 99	Iguana Entertainment	Acclaim Entertainment	
1998/1999 (2nd)	Computer Sports Game of the Year			
1998/1999 (2nd)	FIFA 99	EA Canada	EA Sports	
1998/1999 (2nd)	Links LS 1999	Access Software	Access Software	
1998/1999 (2nd)	Madden NFL 99	EA Tiburon	EA Sports	
1998/1999 (2nd)	Motocross Madness	Rainbow Studios	Microsoft	
1998/1999 (2nd)	NASCAR Revolution	Stormfront Studios	EA Sports	
1999/2000 (3rd)	Console Sports Game of the Year			
1999/2000 (3rd)	Knockout Kings 2000	Black Ops Entertainment	EA Sports	
1999/2000 (3rd)	NFL 2K	Visual Concepts	Sega	
1999/2000 (3rd)	Tony Hawk's Pro Skater	Neversoft	Activision	
1999/2000 (3rd)	Computer Sports Game of the Year			
1999/2000 (3rd)	FIFA 2000	EA Canada	EA Sports	
1999/2000 (3rd)	Backyard Football	Humongous Entertainment	Humongous Entertainment	
1999/2000 (3rd)	High Heat Baseball 2000	Team .366	The 3DO Company	
1999/2000 (3rd)	NHL 2000	EA Canada	EA Sports	

=== 2000s ===
Year	Game	Developer(s)	Publisher(s)	Ref.
2000 (4th)	Console Sports Game of the Year			
2000 (4th)	SSX	EA Canada	EA Sports	
2000 (4th)	Madden NFL 2001	EA Tiburon	EA Sports	
2000 (4th)	Tony Hawk's Pro Skater 2	Neversoft	Activision	
2000 (4th)	Virtua Tennis	Sega AM3	Sega	
2000 (4th)	PC Sports Game of the Year			
2000 (4th)	FIFA 2001	EA Canada	EA Sports	
2000 (4th)	Motocross Madness 2	Rainbow Studios	Microsoft Games	
2000 (4th)	Championship Manager: Season 00/01	Sports Interactive	Eidos Interactive	
2000 (4th)	Links 2001	Access Software	Microsoft Games	
2001 (5th)	Console Sports Game of the Year			
2001 (5th)	Tony Hawk's Pro Skater 3	Neversoft	Activision	
2001 (5th)	Madden NFL 2002	EA Tiburon	EA Sports	
2001 (5th)	NBA 2K2	Visual Concepts	Sega	
2001 (5th)	SSX Tricky	EA Canada	EA Sports	
2001 (5th)	PC Sports Game of the Year			
2001 (5th)	FIFA 2002	EA Canada	EA Sports	
2001 (5th)	Madden NFL 2002	EA Tiburon	EA Sports	
2001 (5th)	NHL 2002	EA Canada	EA Sports	
2002 (6th)	Console Sports Game of the Year			
2002 (6th)	Madden NFL 2003	EA Tiburon	EA Sports	
2002 (6th)	Aggressive Inline	Z-Axis	Acclaim Entertainment	
2002 (6th)	NCAA Football 2003	EA Tiburon	EA Sports	
2002 (6th)	NHL 2K3	Treyarch	Sega	
2002 (6th)	Tony Hawk's Pro Skater 4	Neversoft	Activision	
2002 (6th)	Computer Sports Game of the Year			
2002 (6th)	Madden NFL 2003	EA Tiburon	EA Sports	
2002 (6th)	High Heat Major League Baseball 2003	Team .366	The 3DO Company	
2002 (6th)	Links 2003	Access Software	Microsoft Game Studios	
2002 (6th)	NBA Live 2003	EA Canada	EA Sports	
2002 (6th)	Tiger Woods PGA Tour 2003	EA Redwood Shores, Headgate Studios	EA Sports	
2003 (7th)	Console Action Sports Game of the Year			
2003 (7th)	SSX 3	EA Canada	EA Sports	
2003 (7th)	NBA Street Vol. 2	EA Canada	EA Sports	
2003 (7th)	NHL Hitz Pro	Next Level Games	Midway Games	
2003 (7th)	Tony Hawk's Underground	Neversoft	Activision	
2003 (7th)	Console Sports Simulation Game of the Year			
2003 (7th)	Madden NFL 2004	EA Tiburon	EA Sports	
2003 (7th)	ESPN NHL Hockey	Kush Games	Sega	
2003 (7th)	NCAA Football 2004	EA Tiburon	EA Sports	
2003 (7th)	Tiger Woods PGA Tour 2004	EA Redwood Shores	EA Sports	
2003 (7th)	Top Spin	PAM Development	Microsoft Game Studios	
2003 (7th)	World Soccer Winning Eleven 6 International	Konami	Konami	
2003 (7th)	Computer Sports Game of the Year			
2003 (7th)	Madden NFL 2004	EA Tiburon	EA Sports	
2003 (7th)	Championship Manager 4	Sports Interactive	Eidos Interactive	
2003 (7th)	Out of the Park 5	.400 Software Studios	.400 Software Studios	
2003 (7th)	Tiger Woods PGA Tour 2004	EA Redwood Shores, Headgate Studios	EA Sports	
2004 (8th)	Console Action Sports Game of the Year			
2004 (8th)	Tony Hawk's Underground 2	Neversoft	Activision	
2004 (8th)	Mario Power Tennis	Camelot Software Planning	Nintendo	
2004 (8th)	NBA Ballers	Midway Games	Midway Games	
2004 (8th)	NFL Street 2	EA Tiburon	EA Sports	
2004 (8th)	Console Sports Simulation Game of the Year			
2004 (8th)	ESPN NFL 2K5	Visual Concepts	Sega	
2004 (8th)	ESPN NHL 2K5	Kush Games	Sega	
2004 (8th)	Madden NFL 2005	EA Tiburon	EA Sports	
2004 (8th)	World Soccer Winning Eleven 7 International	Konami	Konami	
2004 (8th)	Computer Sports Game of the Year			
2004 (8th)	Tiger Woods PGA Tour 2005	EA Redwood Shores	EA Sports	
2005 (9th)	SSX on Tour	EA Canada	EA Sports	
2005 (9th)	MLB 2006	989 Studios	Sony Computer Entertainment	
2005 (9th)	Major League Baseball 2K5: World Series Edition	Visual Concepts	2K Sports	
2005 (9th)	NBA 2K6	Visual Concepts	2K Sports	
2005 (9th)	Super Mario Strikers	Next Level Games	Nintendo	
2006 (10th)	Tony Hawk's Project 8	Neversoft	Activision	
2006 (10th)	FIFA 07	EA Canada	EA Sports	
2006 (10th)	MLB 06: The Show	San Diego Studio	Sony Computer Entertainment	
2006 (10th)	NBA 2K7	Visual Concepts	2K Sports	
2006 (10th)	NBA 07	San Diego Studio	Sony Computer Entertainment	
2007 (11th)	skate.	EA Black Box	EA Sports	
2007 (11th)	FIFA 08	EA Canada	EA Sports	
2007 (11th)	MLB 07: The Show	San Diego Studio	Sony Computer Entertainment	
2007 (11th)	NBA 2K8	Visual Concepts	2K Sports	
2007 (11th)	NHL 08	EA Canada	EA Sports	
2008 (12th)	NHL 09	EA Canada	EA Sports	
2008 (12th)	FIFA 09	EA Canada	EA Sports	
2008 (12th)	Madden NFL 09	EA Tiburon	EA Sports	
2008 (12th)	MLB 08: The Show	San Diego Studio	Sony Computer Entertainment	
2008 (12th)	NBA 2K9	Visual Concepts	2K Sports	
2009 (13th)	FIFA 10	EA Canada	EA Sports	
2009 (13th)	MLB 09: The Show	San Diego Studio	Sony Computer Entertainment	
2009 (13th)	NBA 2K10	Visual Concepts	2K Sports	
2009 (13th)	NHL 10	EA Canada	EA Sports	
2009 (13th)	Tiger Woods PGA Tour 10	EA Tiburon	EA Sports	

=== 2010s ===
Year	Game	Developer(s)	Publisher(s)	Ref.
2010 (14th)	FIFA 11	EA Canada	EA Sports	
2010 (14th)	MLB 10: The Show	San Diego Studio	Sony Computer Entertainment	
2010 (14th)	NBA 2K11	Visual Concepts	2K Sports	
2010 (14th)	NHL 11	EA Canada	EA Sports	
2011 (15th)	FIFA 12	EA Canada	EA Sports	
2011 (15th)	Madden NFL 12	EA Tiburon	EA Sports	
2011 (15th)	MLB 11: The Show	San Diego Studio	Sony Computer Entertainment	
2011 (15th)	NBA 2K12	Visual Concepts	2K Sports	
2011 (15th)	NBA Jam: On Fire Edition	EA Canada	EA Sports	
2012 (16th)	FIFA 13	EA Canada	EA Sports	
2012 (16th)	MLB 12: The Show	San Diego Studio	Sony Computer Entertainment	
2012 (16th)	NBA 2K13	Visual Concepts	2K Sports	
2013 (17th)	FIFA 14	EA Canada	EA Sports	
2013 (17th)	Madden NFL 25	EA Tiburon	EA Sports	
2013 (17th)	MLB 13: The Show	San Diego Studio	Sony Computer Entertainment	
2013 (17th)	NBA 2K14	Visual Concepts	2K Sports	
2013 (17th)	NHL 14	EA Canada	EA Sports	
2014 (18th)	FIFA 15	EA Canada	EA Sports	
2014 (18th)	Madden NFL 15	EA Tiburon	EA Sports	
2014 (18th)	MLB 14: The Show	San Diego Studio	Sony Computer Entertainment	
2014 (18th)	NBA 2K15	Visual Concepts	2K Sports	
2015 (19th)	Rocket League	Psyonix	Psyonix	
2015 (19th)	FIFA 16	EA Canada	EA Sports	
2015 (19th)	Madden NFL 16	EA Tiburon	EA Sports	
2015 (19th)	MLB 15: The Show	San Diego Studio	Sony Computer Entertainment	
2015 (19th)	NBA 2K16	Visual Concepts	2K Sports	
2016 (20th)	Steep	Ubisoft Annecy	Ubisoft	
2016 (20th)	FIFA 17	EA Vancouver, EA Romania	EA Sports	
2016 (20th)	Madden NFL 17	EA Tiburon	EA Sports	
2016 (20th)	MLB 16: The Show	San Diego Studio	Sony Interactive Entertainment	
2016 (20th)	NBA 2K17	Visual Concepts	2K Sports	
2017 (21st)	FIFA 18	EA Vancouver, EA Romania	EA Sports	
2017 (21st)	Everybody's Golf	Clap Hanz, Japan Studio	Sony Interactive Entertainment	
2017 (21st)	Golf Clash	Playdemic	Playdemic, Electronic Arts	
2017 (21st)	Madden NFL 18	EA Tiburon	EA Sports	
2017 (21st)	MLB The Show 17	San Diego Studio	Sony Interactive Entertainment	
2018 (22nd)	Mario Tennis Aces	Camelot Software Planning	Nintendo	
2018 (22nd)	FIFA 19	EA Vancouver, EA Romania	EA Sports	
2018 (22nd)	MLB The Show 18	San Diego Studio	Sony Interactive Entertainment	
2019 (23rd)	FIFA 20	EA Vancouver, EA Romania	EA Sports	
2019 (23rd)	Madden NFL 20	EA Tiburon	EA Sports	
2019 (23rd)	MLB The Show 19	San Diego Studio	Sony Interactive Entertainment	
2019 (23rd)	NBA 2K20	Visual Concepts	2K Sports	
2019 (23rd)	NHL 20	EA Vancouver	EA Sports	

=== 2020s ===
Year	Game	Developer(s)	Publisher(s)	Ref.
2020 (24th)	Tony Hawk's Pro Skater 1 + 2	Vicarious Visions	Activision	
2020 (24th)	FIFA 21	EA Vancouver, EA Romania	EA Sports	
2020 (24th)	MLB The Show 20	San Diego Studio	Sony Interactive Entertainment	
2020 (24th)	NBA 2K21	Visual Concepts	2K Sports	
2020 (24th)	PGA Tour 2K21	HB Studios	2K Sports	
2021 (25th)	Mario Golf: Super Rush	Camelot Software Planning	Nintendo	
2021 (25th)	FIFA 22	EA Vancouver, EA Romania	EA Sports	
2021 (25th)	NBA 2K22	Visual Concepts	2K Sports	
2021 (25th)	Riders Republic	Ubisoft Annecy	Ubisoft	
2021 (25th)	The Climb 2	Crytek	Crytek	
2022 (26th)	OlliOlli World	Roll7	Private Division	
2022 (26th)	FIFA 23	EA Vancouver, EA Romania	EA Sports	
2022 (26th)	Mario Strikers: Battle League	Next Level Games	Nintendo	
2022 (26th)	MLB The Show 22	San Diego Studio	Sony Interactive Entertainment	
2022 (26th)	NBA 2K23	Visual Concepts	2K Sports	
2023 (27th)	MLB The Show 23	San Diego Studio	Sony Interactive Entertainment	
2023 (27th)	EA Sports FC 24	EA Vancouver, EA Romania	EA Sports	
2023 (27th)	WWE 2K23	Visual Concepts	2K Sports	
2024 (28th)	MLB The Show 24	San Diego Studio	Sony Interactive Entertainment	
2024 (28th)	EA Sports College Football 25	EA Tiburon	EA Sports	
2024 (28th)	EA Sports FC 25	EA Vancouver, EA Romania	EA Sports	
2024 (28th)	NBA 2K25	Visual Concepts	2K Sports	
2025 (29th)	Rematch	Sloclap	Kepler Interactive	
2025 (29th)	EA Sports FC 26	EA Vancouver, EA Romania	EA Sports	
2025 (29th)	PGA Tour 2K25	HB Studios	2K Sports	
2025 (29th)	MLB The Show 25	San Diego Studio	Sony Interactive Entertainment	
2025 (29th)	NBA 2K26	Visual Concepts	2K Sports	

== Multiple nominations and wins ==
=== Developers and publishers ===
EA Sports has published the most nominees and winners, while EA Vancouver (formerly known as EA Canada) has developed the most nominees and award winners. EA Canada is also the only developer that has won console and computer awards with different games, being SSX for console and FIFA 2001 for computer in 2001. EA Tiburon is the second-most awarded developer, and is also the only developer to win both console and computer awards with the same game, being Madden NFL 2003 in 2003 and Madden NFL 2004 in 2004. 2K Sports has been the most nominated publisher that has never won Sports Game of the Year, while Access Software is the most nominated developer that has never won.

Developers
Developer	Nominations	Wins
EA Canada/Vancouver	42	17
EA Tiburon	22	4
Neversoft	7	3
San Diego Studio	20	2
EA Romania	10	2
Camelot Software Planning	4	2
Visual Concepts	24	1
EA Redwood Shores	4	1
Konami	3	1
Rainbow Studios	2	1
Ubisoft Annecy	2	1
Access Software	4	0
Next Level Games	3	0
HB Studios	2	0
Headgate Studios	2	0
Iguana Entertainment	2	0
Kush Games	2	0
Midway Games	2	0
Stormfront Studios	2	0
Sports Interactive	2	0
Team .366	2	0

Publishers
Publisher	Nominations	Wins
EA Sports	71	24
Activision	8	4
Nintendo	7	3
Sony Computer/Interactive Entertainment	24	2
Sega	9	1
Microsoft Game Studios	5	1
Konami	3	1
Ubisoft	2	1
2K Sports	22	0
Acclaim Entertainment	3	0
Access Software	2	0
Eidos Interactive	2	0
Midway Games	3	0
The 3DO Company	2	0

=== Franchises ===
EA Sports' FIFA/FC series has received the most nominations and has won the most awards. The FIFA/FC series has won Computer Sports Game of the Year five years in a row from 1998 to 2002, and later has won Sports Game of the Year six years in a row from 2010 to 2015. Madden NFL has the third-most nominations and second-most awards, and is the only franchise to win both console and computer awards in the same year, first in 2003 and second in 2004. The Tony Hawk's franchise is tied with Madden NFL for second-most wins in this category. NBA 2K is the most nominated franchise that has never won an award in this category, despite having the second-most nominations (tied with MLB: The Show).

Franchises
Franchise	Nominations	Wins
FIFA/FC	25	13
Madden NFL	17	4
Tony Hawk's	8	4
SSX	4	3
MLB: The Show	19	2
Mario Sports	5	2
NHL (EA Sports)	9	1
Tiger Woods PGA Tour	5	1
NFL 2K	3	1
Motocross Madness	2	1
NBA 2K	19	0
Links	4	0
NCAA/College Football	3	0
NHL 2K (Note: ESPN NHL Hockey is a part of the NHL 2K series.)	3	0
Championship Manager	2	0
Everybody's Golf/Hot Shot Golf	2	0
High Heat Major League Baseball	2	0
NASCAR (EA Sports)	2	0
NBA Live	2	0
NFL Quarterback Club	2	0
PGA Tour 2K	2	0
Winning Eleven	2	0
