= 6th Annual Interactive Achievement Awards =

Video game award ceremony

- Date: February 27, 2003
- Venue: Hard Rock Hotel and Casino
- Country: Las Vegas, Nevada, USA
- Hosted by: Dave Foley

Highlights
- Most awards: Battlefield 1942 (4)
- Most nominations: Metroid Prime (10)
- Game of the Year: Battlefield 1942
- Hall of Fame: Yu Suzuki

The 6th Annual Interactive Achievement Awards was the 6th edition of the Interactive Achievement Awards, an annual awards event that honored the best games in the video game industry during 2002. The awards were arranged by the Academy of Interactive Arts & Sciences (AIAS) and were held at the Hard Rock Hotel and Casino in Las Vegas on February 27, 2003 as part of the Academy's 2003 D.I.C.E. Summit. It was hosted by Dave Foley with presenters including Cliff Bleszinski, Xander Berkeley, Don James, Shigeru Miyamoto, Julie Benz, Blue Man Group, Tony Hawk, Ed Fries, Kelly Hu, David Jones, Nina Kaczorowski, Doug Lowenstein, Syd Mead, Mike Metzger, Vince Neil, Tommy Tallarico, Amy Weber and Victor Webster. It had musical performances by Unwritten Law and The Players Band.

A trimmed down and edited version of this event was broadcast on the G4 program Pulse, with coverage by Patrick Clark, the host of Pulse and Diane Mizota, one of the hosts from Filter.

The Academy introduced the genre awards for "First-Person Action Game of the Year" for both console and computer. "Console Platform Action/Adventure Game of the Year" was also introduced. Originally separate console and computer awards for "Children's Title of the Year" were offered, but a single "Family Game of the Year" would be presented that featured finalists for both console and PC releases. The computer award for "Educational Title of the Year" was originally part of the category listings, but was not featured on the nomination form.

Battlefield 1942 won the most awards, including "Game of the Year". Metroid Prime received the most nominations. Electronic Arts received the most nominations, published the most nominated games, published the most award-winning games, and won the most awards. Rockstar North and Maxis were the only developers with more than one award-winning game. Four franchises had two award-winning titles at this awards ceremony:

- Grand Theft Auto: Grand Theft Auto: Vice City for "Console Action/Adventure Game of the Year", and Grand Theft Auto III for "Computer Action/Adventure Game of the Year".
- Medal of Honor: Medal of Honor: Frontline for outstanding achievement in "Original Music Composition" and "Sound Design", and Medal of Honor: Allied Assault for "Computer First-Person Action Game of the Year".
- Metroid: Metroid Prime for "Console First-Person Action Game of the Year", and Metroid Fusion for "Handheld Game of the Year".
- The Sims: The Sims: Unleashed expansion for "Computer Simulation Game of the Year", and The Sims Online for "Massive Multiplayer/Persistent World Game of the Year".

Yu Suzuki, creator of Virtua Fighter, Shenmue, and other Sega franchises, was inducted into the Academy of Interactive Arts and Sciences Hall of Fame.

== Winners and nominees ==
Winners are listed first, highlighted in boldface, and indicated with a double dagger (‡).

=== Game of the Year awards ===
**Game of the Year**: **Battlefield 1942** — **DICE**, **Electronic Arts**‡; Animal Crossing — Nintendo EAD; Grand Theft Auto: Vice City — Rockstar North; Metroid Prime — Retro Studios, Nintendo; Ratchet & Clank — Insomniac Games, Sony Computer Entertainment
**Console Game of the Year**: **Tom Clancy's Splinter Cell** — **Ubisoft Montreal**‡; Animal Crossing — Nintendo EAD; Eternal Darkness: Sanity's Requiem — Silicon Knights, Nintendo; Grand Theft Auto: Vice City — Rockstar North; Metroid Prime — Retro Studios, Nintendo; Ratchet & Clank — Insomniac Games, Sony Computer Entertainment	**Computer Game of the Year**: **Battlefield 1942** — **DICE**, **Electronic Arts**‡; Age of Mythology — Ensemble Studios, Microsoft Game Studios; Medal of Honor: Allied Assault — 2015, Electronic Arts; Neverwinter Nights — BioWare, Infogrames; Warcraft III: Reign of Chaos — Blizzard Entertainment

=== Innovation Awards ===
**Innovation in Computer Gaming**: **Battlefield 1942** — **DICE**, **Electronic Arts**‡; Dungeon Siege — Gas Powered Games, Microsoft Game Studios; Grand Theft Auto III — Rockstar North; Medal of Honor: Allied Assault — 2015, Electronic Arts; Neverwinter Nights — BioWare, Infogrames; Warcraft III: Reign of Chaos — Blizzard Entertainment	**Innovation in Console Gaming**: **Animal Crossing** — **Nintendo EAD**‡; Eternal Darkness: Sanity's Requiem — Silicon Knights, Nintendo; Grand Theft Auto: Vice City — Rockstar North; Metroid Prime — Retro Studios, Nintendo; Tom Clancy's Splinter Cell — Ubisoft Montreal

=== Craft awards ===
**Outstanding Achievement in Game Design**: **Animal Crossing** — **Nintendo EAD**‡; Battlefield 1942 — DICE, Electronic Arts; Metroid Prime — Retro Studios, Nintendo; Neverwinter Nights — BioWare, Infogrames; Warcraft III: Reign of Chaos — Blizzard Entertainment	**Outstanding Achievement in Character or Story Development**: **Eternal Darkness: Sanity's Requiem** — **Silicon Knights**, **Nintendo**‡; Grand Theft Auto: Vice City — Rockstar North; Kingdom Hearts — SquareSoft, Square Electronic Arts; Syberia — Microïds, The Adventure Company; The Mark of Kri — SCE San Diego Studio
**Outstanding Achievement in Animation**: **Sly Cooper and the Thievius Raccoonus** — **Sucker Punch Productions**, **Sony Computer Entertainment**‡; Final Fantasy X — SquareSoft, Square Electronic Arts; Kingdom Hearts — SquareSoft, Square Electronic Arts; Ratchet & Clank — Insomniac Games, Sony Computer Entertainment; The Mark of Kri — SCE San Diego Studio	**Outstanding Achievement in Art Direction**: **Sly Cooper and the Thievius Raccoonus** — **Sucker Punch Productions**, **Sony Computer Entertainment**‡; Eternal Darkness: Sanity's Requiem — Silicon Knights, Nintendo; Kingdom Hearts — SquareSoft, Square Electronic Arts; Metroid Prime — Retro Studios, Nintendo; Ratchet & Clank — Insomniac Games, Sony Computer Entertainment
**Outstanding Achievement in Original Music Composition**: **Medal of Honor: Frontline** — **EA Los Angeles**‡; Metroid Prime — Retro Studios, Nintendo; Rygar: The Legendary Adventure — Tecmo; The Elder Scrolls III: Morrowind — Bethesda Game Studios; Warcraft III: Reign of Chaos — Blizzard Entertainment	**Outstanding Achievement in Sound Design**: **Medal of Honor: Frontline** — **EA Los Angeles**‡; Eternal Darkness: Sanity's Requiem — Silicon Knights, Nintendo; Grand Theft Auto: Vice City — Rockstar North; Metroid Prime — Retro Studios, Nintendo; No One Lives Forever 2: A Spy in H.A.R.M.'s Way — Monolith Productions, Sierra Entertainment, Vivendi Universal Games; The Lord of the Rings: The Two Towers — Stormfront Studios, Electronic Arts; Tom Clancy's Splinter Cell — Ubisoft Montreal
**Outstanding Achievement in Gameplay Engineering**: **Tom Clancy's Splinter Cell** — **Ubisoft Montreal**‡; Animal Crossing — Nintendo EAD; Metroid Prime — Retro Studios, Nintendo; Ratchet & Clank — Insomniac Games, Sony Computer Entertainment	**Outstanding Achievement in Visual Engineering**: **The Lord of the Rings: The Two Towers** — **Stormfront Studios**, **Electronic Arts**‡; Asheron's Call 2: Fallen Kings — Turbine, Microsoft Game Studios; Metroid Prime — Retro Studios, Nintendo; Tom Clancy's Splinter Cell — Ubisoft Montreal; Unreal Tournament 2003 — Epic Games, Digital Extremes, Infogrames

=== Console Awards ===
**Console Action/Adventure Game of the Year**: **Grand Theft Auto: Vice City** — **Rockstar North**‡; Hitman 2: Silent Assassin — IO Interactive, Eidos Interactive; Jet Set Radio Future — Smilebit, Sega; Rez — United Game Artists, Sega; Tom Clancy's Splinter Cell — Ubisoft Montreal	**Console Fighting Game of the Year**: **Tekken 4** — **Namco**‡; Capcom vs. SNK 2 EO — Capcom; Godzilla: Destroy All Monsters Melee — Pipeworks Software, Infogrames; Mortal Kombat: Deadly Alliance — Midway Games; Virtua Fighter 4 — Sega AM2
**Console First-Person Action Game of the Year**: **Metroid Prime** — **Retro Studios**, **Nintendo**‡; James Bond 007: Nightfire — Eurocom, Electronic Arts; Medal of Honor: Frontline — EA Los Angeles; TimeSplitters 2 — Free Radical Design, Eidos Interactive; Tom Clancy's Ghost Recon — Red Storm Entertainment, Ubisoft	**Console Platform Action/Adventure Game of the Year**: **Ratchet & Clank** — **Insomniac Games**, **Sony Computer Entertainment**‡; Sly Cooper and the Thievius Raccoonus — Sucker Punch Productions, Sony Computer Entertainment; Super Mario Sunshine — Nintendo EAD
**Console Racing Game of the Year**: **Need for Speed: Hot Pursuit 2** — **EA Black Box**‡; ATV Offroad Fury 2 — Rainbow Studios, Sony Computer Entertainment; MotoGP: Ultimate Racing Technology — Climax Brighton, THQ; NASCAR Thunder 2003 — EA Tiburon; RalliSport Challenge — DICE, Microsoft Game Studios	**Console Role-Playing Game of the Year**: **Animal Crossing** — **Nintendo EAD**‡; Final Fantasy X — SquareSoft, Square Electronic Arts; Kingdom Hearts — SquareSoft, Square Electronic Arts; Suikoden III — Konami; Wild Arms 3 — Media.Vision, Sony Computer Entertainment
**Console Sports Game of the Year**: **Madden NFL 2003** — **EA Tiburon**‡; Aggressive Inline — Z-Axis, Acclaim Entertainment; NCAA Football 2003 — EA Tiburon; NHL 2K3 — Treyarch, Sega; Tony Hawk's Pro Skater 4 — Neversoft, Activision	**Family Game of the Year (Note: Finalists included games for both console and PC.)**: **Mario Party 4** — **Hudson Soft**, **Nintendo**‡; Backyard Football — Left Field Productions, Humongous Entertainment, Infogrames; Harry Potter and the Chamber of Secrets — EA UK; Scooby-Doo! Night of 100 Frights — Heavy Iron Studios, THQ; SpongeBob SquarePants: Employee of the Month — AWE Productions, THQ
**Handheld Game of the Year**: **Metroid Fusion** — **Nintendo R&D1**‡; Castlevania: Harmony of Dissonance — Konami; The Legend of Zelda: A Link to the Past and Four Swords — Flagship, Capcom, Nintendo R&D2; Yoshi's Island: Super Mario Advance 3 — Nintendo R&D2

=== PC Awards ===
**Computer Action/Adventure Game of the Year**: **Grand Theft Auto III** — **Rockstar North**‡; Star Wars Jedi Knight II: Jedi Outcast — Raven Software, LucasArts; Syberia — Microïds, The Adventure Company; The Thing — Computer Artworks, Black Label Games	**Computer First-Person Action Game of the Year**: **Medal of Honor: Allied Assault** — **2015**, **Electronic Arts**‡; America's Army — United States Army; No One Lives Forever 2: A Spy in H.A.R.M.'s Way — Monolith Productions, Sierra Entertainment, Vivendi Universal Games
**Computer Role-Playing Game of the Year**: **Neverwinter Nights** — **BioWare**, **Infogrames**‡; Arx Fatalis — Arkane Studios, JoWooD Productions; Dungeon Siege — Gas Powered Games, Microsoft Game Studios; Freedom Force — Irrational Games, Crave Entertainment, Electronic Arts; The Elder Scrolls III: Morrowind — Bethesda Game Studios	**Computer Simulation Game of the Year**: **The Sims: Unleashed** — **Maxis**, **Electronic Arts**‡; Combat Flight Simulator 3: Battle for Europe — Aces Game Studio, Microsoft Games Studios; MechWarrior 4: Mercenaries — FASA Studio, Microsoft Game Studios; The Aurora Neverwinter Toolset — BioWare, Infogrames
**Computer Sports Game of the Year**: **Madden NFL 2003** — **EA Tiburon**‡; High Heat Major League Baseball 2003 — Team .366, The 3DO Company; Links 2003 — Access Software, Microsoft Game Studios; NBA Live 2003 — EA Canada; Tiger Woods PGA Tour 2003 — Headgate Studios, Electronic Arts	**Computer Strategy Game of the Year**: **Warcraft III: Reign of Chaos** — **Blizzard Entertainment**‡; Age of Mythology — Ensemble Studios, Microsoft Game Studios; Medieval: Total War — Creative Assembly, Activision

=== Online Awards ===
**Online Gameplay of the Year**: **Battlefield 1942** — **DICE**, **Electronic Arts**‡; Command & Conquer: Renegade — Westwood Studios, Electronic Arts; Twisted Metal: Black - Online — Incognito Entertainment, Sony Computer Entertainment	**Massive Multiplayer/Persistent World Game of the Year**: **The Sims Online** — **Maxis**, **Electronic Arts**‡; Anarchy Online: The Notum Wars — Funcom; Asheron's Call 2: Fallen Kings — Turbine, Microsoft Game Studios; Dark Age of Camelot: Shrouded Isles — Mythic Entertainment, Vivendi Universal Games; Toontown Online — Disney's Virtual Reality Studio

=== Hall of Fame Award ===
- Yu Suzuki

=== Multiple nominations and awards ===
==== Multiple Nominations ====
Games that received multiple nominations
Nominations	Game
10	Metroid Prime
6	Animal Crossing
6	Grand Theft Auto: Vice City
6	Ratchet & Clank
6	Tom Clancy's Splinter Cell
5	Battlefield 1942
5	Eternal Darkness: Sanity's Requiem
5	Warcraft III: Reign of Chaos
4	Kingdom Hearts
4	Neverwinter Nights
3	Medal of Honor: Allied Assault
3	Medal of Honor: Frontline
3	Sly Cooper and the Thievius Raccoonus
2	Age of Mythology
2	Asheron's Call 2: Fallen Kings
2	Dungeon Siege
2	Final Fantasy X
2	Grand Theft Auto III
2	Madden NFL 2003
2	No One Lives Forever 2: A Spy in H.A.R.M.'s Way
2	Syberia
2	The Elder Scrolls III: Morrowind
2	The Lord of the Rings: The Two Towers
2	The Mark of Kri

Nominations by company
Nominations	Games	Company
34	18	Electronic Arts
26	8	Nintendo
13	5	Sony Computer Entertainment
10	7	Microsoft Game Studios
10	1	Retro Studios
8	2	Rockstar North
7	3	Infogrames
6	2	SquareSoft
6	1	DICE
6	1	Insomniac Games
6	1	Ubisoft
5	2	BioWare
5	1	Blizzard Entertainment
5	1	Silicon Knights
4	4	Sega
3	3	THQ
3	2	Vivendi Universal Games
3	1	2015
3	1	Sucker Punch Productions
2	2	Activision
2	2	Capcom
2	2	Eidos Interactive
2	2	Konami
2	2	Maxis
2	1	Bethesda Game Studios
2	1	Ensemble Studios
2	1	Gas Powered Games
2	1	Microïds
2	1	Sierra Entertainment
2	1	Stormfront Studios
2	1	The Adventure Company
2	1	Turbine

==== Multiple awards ====
Games that received multiple awards
Awards	Game
4	Battlefield 1942
3	Animal Crossing
2	Madden NFL 2003
2	Medal of Honor: Frontline
2	Sly Cooper and the Thievius Raccoonus
2	Tom Clancy's Splinter Cell

Awards by company
Awards	Games	Company
13	8	Electronic Arts
7	5	Nintendo
4	1	DICE
3	2	Sony Computer Entertainment
2	2	Maxis
2	2	Rockstar North
2	2	Ubisoft Montreal
2	1	Sucker Punch Productions
