= Rematch (video game) =

2025 association football video game

- Developer: Sloclap
- Publishers: Sloclap; Kepler Interactive
- Director: Pierre Tarno
- Engine: Unreal Engine 5
- Platforms: PlayStation 5; Windows; Xbox Series X/S
- Release: 19 June 2025
- Genre: Sports
- Mode: Multiplayer

Rematch is a 2025 sports game developed by Sloclap and co-published with Kepler Interactive. In the game, players control one player on their team in an association football match from a third-person perspective. The game was released on 19 June 2025 for Microsoft Windows, PlayStation 5, and Xbox Series X and Series S. The Academy of Interactive Arts & Sciences awarded Rematch with Sports Game of the Year at the 29th Annual D.I.C.E. Awards. Cross-play was released in September 2025, which greatly improved eSports performance like the Major Rematch Championship.

== Gameplay ==
Rematch is a sports video game played from a third-person perspective. Players control a single footballer on the team, switching between attacker and defender and even the goalkeeper, which has specific abilities. The game features an aim and shoot mechanic for shooting the ball and scoring goals. The game is set in closed virtual reality arenas, with no fouls hence no penalties, no offside or any breaks in play. The ball does not go out of play so there are no throw-ins or goal kicks either.

At launch, the game features four multiplayer modes: 3v3, 4v4, and 5v5, and a ranked 5v5 mode. The game will contain seasonal content to add game modes, events, features, and cosmetics for both players and stadiums. An offline mode with AI-controlled teammates is set to be released in 2026.

== Development ==
The game is developed by Sloclap, which previously worked on Sifu and Absolver. According to game director Pierre Tarno, the studio's experience in working on brawler games "provided valuable insights into the game's feel, reactivity, and precision, as well as conveying physicality and impact through complex animation systems". Absolver, in particular, inspired Rematch's online technology. Tarno also compared the game to action video games and shooter video games played from third-person. It was described by the team as a "simple game", though Tarno added that the game was about "observation and positioning", and players are tasked to make dynamic changes to their tactics in order to succeed. An early mechanic allows players to wall-run, though this was scrapped because the team felt that it "strayed too far from a credible football fantasy that [they] were aiming for". Overwatch and Rocket League were cited by the team as sources of inspiration. The game is developed with Unreal Engine 5.

Sloclap and publisher Kepler Interactive announced the game in December 2024 for Windows PC, PlayStation 5, and Xbox Series X and Series S. The game was released on 19 June 2025. Sloclap apologized to players after failing to enable cross-platform play at launch, and promised that the feature will be added to the game through a post-launch update.

== Reception ==
Reception

Aggregate scores
Aggregator	Score
Metacritic	75/100
OpenCritic	51% recommend

Review score
Publication	Score
GamesRadar+	3.5/5

Rematch received "generally favorable" scores according to review aggregator website Metacritic. Fellow review aggregator OpenCritic assessed that the game received fair approval, being recommended by 51% of critics.

Fraser Gilbert of Pure Xbox expressed that "the controls offer amazing potential and allow you to wield all sorts of great moves as long as you're willing to put the effort in." Other reviewers were more critical of Rematch. Ben Sledge of TheGamer took issue with the game's live-service elements, citing server issues and lacklustre battle passes. Sledge said that "the game has serious issues that border on rendering the game completely unfun."

The game attracted more than 1 million players on launch day. Sloclap subsequently announced the game had sold over 1 million copies and attracted 2.5 million players in its first weekend; reaching 3 million players on 24 June 2025.

=== Awards ===
Year	Award	Category	Result	Ref.
2025	Golden Joystick Awards	Best Multiplayer Game	Nominated	
2025	The Game Awards 2025	Best Sports/Racing Game	Nominated	
2026	29th Annual D.I.C.E. Awards	Sports Game of the Year	Won	
