= ESPN NBA 2Night =

2000 sports video game

- US box art for PS2 version
- Developers: Sunset Entertainment (DC); Konami Computer Entertainment Osaka (PS2)
- Publisher: Konami
- Director: Kazuo Iwasaki (PS2)
- Producer: Kazutomo Terada (PS2)
- Composer: Kazuhiko Uehara (PS2)
- Platforms: Dreamcast, PlayStation 2
- Release: Dreamcast: NA: November 20, 2000; PlayStation 2: JP: December 21, 2000; NA: February 13, 2001; EU: March 16, 2001
- Genre: Sports
- Modes: Single-player, multiplayer

ESPN NBA 2Night is a video game developed and published by Konami for Dreamcast and PlayStation 2 in 2000-2001. A sequel, ESPN NBA 2Night 2002, was released in 2002 for the PlayStation 2 and Xbox.

== Reception ==
Reception

Aggregate score
Aggregator	Score	
Aggregator	Dreamcast	PS2
Metacritic	29/100	62/100

Review scores
Publication	Score	
Publication	Dreamcast	PS2
CNET Gamecenter	3/10	N/A
Electronic Gaming Monthly	2/10	4/10
EP Daily	3/10	7/10
Game Informer	N/A	4.25/10
GameSpot	4/10	7/10
GameSpy	70%	N/A
IGN	1/10	6.4/10
Next Generation	1/5	N/A
Official U.S. PlayStation Magazine	N/A	2/5
PlayStation: The Official Magazine	N/A	6/10
The Cincinnati Enquirer	N/A	3/5

The PS2 version received "mixed" reviews, while the Dreamcast version received "unfavorable" reviews, according to the review aggregation website Metacritic. Rob Smolka of NextGen said that the latter console version was "Only recommended for those who demand to listen to a repetitious Stuart Scott supplying the color commentary." Jake the Snake of GamePro said of the former console version, "Despite its flaws, NBA2 Night [sic] is a decent first-generation effort—easy to pick up and play with several nice features: all NBA players and teams, icon passing, on-the-fly play calling, and so on. But NBA Live 2001 for the PS2 plays much more naturally and is more fun." (Note: GamePro gave the PlayStation 2 version two 3.5/5 scores for graphics and control, 4/5 for sound, and 3/5 for fun factor.)
