= High Heat Major League Baseball 2003 =

2002 video game

- PAL region PS2 cover art
- Developers: Team .366; Möbius Entertainment (GBA)
- Publisher: The 3DO Company
- Series: High Heat Major League Baseball
- Platforms: PlayStation 2, Windows, Game Boy Advance
- Release: PlayStation 2: NA: February 11, 2002; PAL: April 5, 2002; Game Boy Advance: NA: March 5, 2002; Windows: NA: March 11, 2002
- Genre: Sports
- Modes: Single-player, multiplayer

High Heat Major League Baseball 2003 was the second-to-last of a series of baseball computer games, released on PlayStation 2 and Microsoft Windows; a different game of the same name was released for the Game Boy Advance. The game, featuring the officially licensed team and player names from all 30 MLB teams, was created by The 3DO Company, which later filed for bankruptcy in May 2003. Portions of the game's earnings were donated to "Curt's Pitch for ALS".

== Reception ==
Reception

Aggregate score
Aggregator	Score		
Aggregator	GBA	PC	PS2
Metacritic	64/100	67/100	84/100

Review scores
Publication	Score		
Publication	GBA	PC	PS2
AllGame	N/A	N/A	3.5/5
Computer Gaming World	N/A	3/5	N/A
Electronic Gaming Monthly	N/A	N/A	8/10
Famitsu	23/40	N/A	N/A
Game Informer	7.25/10	N/A	7.5/10
GamePro	N/A	N/A	5/5
GameRevolution	N/A	N/A	B+
GameSpot	6.1/10	6.2/10	8.7/10
GameSpy	54%	75%	83%
GameZone	N/A	N/A	8.7/10
IGN	5.1/10	7/10	8.8/10
Nintendo Power	3.7/5	N/A	N/A
Official U.S. PlayStation Magazine	N/A	N/A	4.5/5
PC Gamer (US)	N/A	70%	N/A
The Cincinnati Enquirer	N/A	N/A	4/5

The PlayStation 2 version received "favorable" reviews, while the PC and Game Boy Advance versions received "mixed or average reviews", according to the review aggregation website Metacritic. In Japan, where the GBA version was ported and published by Takara on July 18, 2002, followed by the PS2 version on September 5, Famitsu gave the former a score of 23 out of 40. During the AIAS' 6th Annual Interactive Achievement Awards, High Heat Major League Baseball 2003 received a nomination for "Computer Sports Game of the Year", yet ultimately lost to Madden NFL 2003.
