= Tiger Woods PGA Tour 2003 =

2002 video game

- Developers: EA Redwood Shores; Headgate Studios (PC & Mac)
- Publishers: EA Sports; Aspyr (Mac)
- Series: PGA Tour
- Platforms: Xbox, PlayStation 2, GameCube, Microsoft Windows, Mac OS
- Release: Xbox: NA: October 29, 2002; EU: November 22, 2002; PlayStation 2: NA: October 29, 2002; EU: November 29, 2002; GameCube: NA: October 29, 2002; EU: December 6, 2002; Microsoft Windows: NA: November 5, 2002; EU: November 22, 2002; Mac OS: NA: June 20, 2003
- Genre: Sports
- Modes: Single-player, multiplayer

Tiger Woods PGA Tour 2003 is a sports video game developed by EA Redwood Shores for the Xbox, PlayStation 2 and GameCube versions and Headgate Studios for the Microsoft Windows and Mac OS versions and published by EA Sports.

== Reception ==
Reception

Aggregate score
Aggregator	Score			
Aggregator	GameCube	PC	PS2	Xbox
Metacritic	90/100	92/100	88/100	88/100

Review scores
Publication	Score			
Publication	GameCube	PC	PS2	Xbox
AllGame	N/A	N/A	4/5	N/A
Eurogamer	9/10	N/A	N/A	N/A
Game Informer	8/10	N/A	N/A	N/A
GamePro	4.5/5	N/A	4.5/5	4.5/5
GameSpot	8.7/10	9.1/10	8.7/10	8.7/10
GameSpy	N/A	4.5/5	4.5/5	4.5/5
GameZone	9/10	9/10	8.8/10	8.7/10
IGN	8.9/10	9/10	8.9/10	8.5/10
Nintendo Power	4.6/5	N/A	N/A	N/A
Official U.S. PlayStation Magazine	N/A	N/A	4.5/5	N/A
Official Xbox Magazine (US)	N/A	N/A	N/A	9.2/10
PC Gamer (US)	N/A	89%	N/A	N/A
BBC Sport	N/A	N/A	83%	N/A
Maxim	8/10	N/A	8/10	8/10

Tiger Woods PGA Tour 2003 received "critical acclaim" on the GameCube and PC and "generally favorable" reviews on the PlayStation 2 and Xbox, according to review aggregator Metacritic. GameSpot named PGA Tour 2003 the second-best computer game of November 2002. It was also runner-up for the publication's annual "Best Sports Game on PC" award, which went to Madden NFL 2003.

PGA Tour 2003 was nominated for Computer Gaming World's 2002 "Sports Game of the Year" award, which ultimately went to Madden NFL 2003. The editors of Computer Games Magazine named PGA Tour 2003 the seventh-best computer game of 2002, and wrote, "Featuring the best swing interface ever created and the most successful career mode yet implemented, it's the biggest step forward in the genre since Links 386." It was a runner-up for GameSpot's annual "Most Improved Sequel on PC" and "Best Traditional Sports Game on Xbox" awards. During the AIAS' 6th Annual Interactive Achievement Awards, PGA Tour 2003 received a nomination for "Computer Sports Game of the Year", ultimately losing to Madden NFL 2003.
