= NBA Live 2003 =

2002 video game

- Cover art with Jason Kidd
- Developers: EA Canada; NuFX (PS)
- Publisher: EA Sports
- Series: NBA Live
- Platforms: PlayStation, PlayStation 2, Xbox, GameCube, Windows
- Release: October 8, 2002: PlayStation, PS2, Xbox; NA: October 8, 2002; AU: November 25, 2002 (PS); AU: November 27, 2002 (Xbox); AU: November 29, 2002 (PS2); EU: November 29, 2002 GameCube; NA: October 8, 2002; AU: November 29, 2002; EU: December 6, 2002 Windows; NA: November 14, 2002; AU: November 21, 2002; EU: November 29, 2002
- Genre: Sports
- Modes: Single-player, multiplayer

NBA Live 2003 is the 2002 installment of the NBA Live video games series. The cover features Jason Kidd as a member of the New Jersey Nets. The game was developed by EA Canada and released on October 8, 2002, for the PlayStation, PlayStation 2, Xbox, and GameCube consoles and November 14, 2002, for Microsoft Windows. It was the last NBA Live game to be released on the original PlayStation. The game includes a soundtrack, which is the first video game soundtrack in history to be certified Platinum by the RIAA, selling over 1,300,000 copies worldwide.

== Reception ==
Reception

Aggregate score
Aggregator	Score			
Aggregator	GameCube	PC	PS2	Xbox
Metacritic	82/100	80/100	83/100	82/100

Review scores
Publication	Score			
Publication	GameCube	PC	PS2	Xbox
AllGame	N/A	N/A	3/5	N/A
Electronic Gaming Monthly	N/A	N/A	8.17/10	8/10
Famitsu	N/A	N/A	32/40	N/A
Game Informer	N/A	N/A	8.75/10	N/A
GamePro	4/5	N/A	4/5	4/5
GameRevolution	N/A	N/A	B+	B+
GameSpot	8.2/10	8.7/10	8.5/10	8.2/10
GameSpy	3.5/5	4/5	3.5/5	3.5/5
GameZone	9/10	N/A	8.8/10	8.8/10
IGN	8.5/10	8.5/10	8.7/10	8.5/10
Nintendo Power	4.1/5	N/A	N/A	N/A
Official U.S. PlayStation Magazine	N/A	N/A	4/5	N/A
Official Xbox Magazine (US)	N/A	N/A	N/A	8.8/10
PC Gamer (US)	N/A	63%	N/A	N/A
Maxim	5/10	N/A	5/10	5/10

The game received "favorable" reviews on all platforms according to video game review aggregator Metacritic. In Japan, where the PlayStation 2 version was released on November 28, 2002, Famitsu gave that console version a score of 32 out of 40. NBA Live 2003 was a runner-up for GameSpot's annual "Best Sports Game on PC" award, which went to Madden NFL 2003. It was also nominated for GameSpot's annual "Best Traditional Sports Game on GameCube" award, but lost to NFL 2K3. During the AIAS' 6th Annual Interactive Achievement Awards, NBA Live 2003 received a nomination for "Computer Sports Game of the Year", yet ultimately lost to Madden NFL 2003.
