= Tony Hawk's Pro Skater 3 =

2001 video game

- Developers: Neversoft (Note: Ported to Windows by Gearbox Software, ported to Mac OS by Beenox); Shaba Games (PS) (Note: Ported to Nintendo 64 by Edge of Reality); Vicarious Visions (GBA); HotGen (GBC)
- Publisher: Activision (Note: Released under the Activision O2 brand) (Note: Mac OS version published by Aspyr)
- Producers: Scott Pease; Ralph D’Amato
- Designers: Chris Rausch; Aaron Cammarata
- Programmer: Mick West
- Artists: Darren Thorne; Johnny Ow
- Series: Tony Hawk's
- Engine: RenderWare
- Platforms: PlayStation; PlayStation 2; Game Boy Color; GameCube; Xbox; Game Boy Advance; Windows; Nintendo 64; Mac OS
- Release: October 30, 2001: PlayStation, PlayStation 2; NA: October 30, 2001; EU: November 30, 2001 Game Boy Color; NA: November 16, 2001; EU: November 23, 2001 GameCube; NA: November 18, 2001; EU: May 3, 2002 Xbox; EU: March 14, 2002; NA: March 15, 2002 Game Boy Advance; NA: March 15, 2002; EU: March 28, 2002 Windows; NA: March 29, 2002; EU: May 10, 2002 Nintendo 64; NA: August 20, 2002 Mac OS; NA: January 31, 2003
- Genre: Sports
- Modes: Single-player, multiplayer

Tony Hawk's Pro Skater 3 is a 2001 skateboarding video game and the third installment in the Tony Hawk's series. It was published by Activision under the Activision O2 label in 2001 for the PlayStation, PlayStation 2, Game Boy Color and GameCube. In 2002, it was published for the Xbox, Game Boy Advance, Windows, Mac OS, and the Nintendo 64. It was the final official release for the Nintendo 64 (having been discontinued 3 months prior) and the only game that was released for the system in 2002, the first game released for the PlayStation 2 supporting online play and was a launch title for the GameCube in North America and PAL regions.

Tony Hawk's Pro Skater 3 received critical acclaim, with the PlayStation 2 version being tied for highest-rated PlayStation 2 game on Metacritic alongside Grand Theft Auto III, and selling over 2.1 million copies in the United States by July 2006. Pro Skater 3 is also considered to be one of the greatest video games ever made.

A remake of the game is included as part of Tony Hawk's Pro Skater 3 + 4, released in 2025.

== Gameplay ==
The Windows version of Pro Skater 3

Tony Hawk's Pro Skater 3 saw the introduction of the revert, a trick that enabled vert combos to be tied together with a manual, by tapping a button when landing in a quarterpipe; it allows for much longer combos than in the previous two games, where landing in a quarterpipe would finish a combo. It also added hidden combos. These were variations on standard tricks that could be performed as grab, flip, lip, or grind tricks. For example, double-tapping the kickflip button would make the character perform a double kickflip. This system would later be refined in Pro Skater 4.

The game stood out in the franchise for being the first title to have online capabilities. Users could connect directly to other players online on the PlayStation 2 version—even prior to the launch of the network adapter, with a USB Ethernet adapter. The PlayStation and Nintendo 64 versions run on the Pro Skater 2 engine.

The game has new tricks such as the Cannonball, Wrap Around, Fingerflip, Del Mar Indy and a new animation for the Airwalk. The Xbox version has an improved frame rate over the PlayStation 2 and GameCube version, as well as an additional level, the Oil Rig, that later returned as a level in Tony Hawk's American Wasteland.

=== Featured pro skaters and characters ===
The game features thirteen professional skateboarders, along with several unlockable original characters, depending on the version. Furthermore, the game features Darth Maul, Doomguy (Note: PC version only) and Wolverine via licensing deals, as well as professional surfer Kelly Slater (to coincide with Kelly Slater's Pro Surfer). Additionally, the Japanese and other Asian versions feature exclusive Japanese pro skaters.

Featured pro skaters			Celebrity guest skaters	
Steve Caballero; Kareem Campbell; Eric Koston; Rune Glifberg; Tony Hawk; Bucky Lasek	Bam Margera; Rodney Mullen; Chad Muska; Andrew Reynolds; Geoff Rowley; Elissa Steamer	Jamie Thomas; Junnosuke Y^{b}; Shin Okada^{b}; Hiroki Saegusa^{b}; Sukehachi^{b}	Darth Maul^{a}; Wolverine^{a}; Officer Dick^{a}; Private Carrera^{a}; Ollie the Magic Bum^{a}; Kelly Slater^{a}	Demoness^{a}; Neversoft Eyeball^{a}; Doom Guy^{a}^{c}; X-Ray^{a}^{d}; Shaun Palmer^{a}^{e}; Mindy^{a}^{e}

^a unlockable ^b Japan-exclusive ^c PC-exclusive ^d Xbox-exclusive ^e Game Boy Advance-exclusive

== Development ==
Shortly prior to release, Neversoft quickly amended some of the objectives in the Airport level due to sensitivity reasons in light of the September 11 attacks, where terrorist non-player characters were instead reskinned into pickpockets. Series producer Ralph D'Amato recalled: "When 9/11 happened, we were almost finished with Pro Skater 3. We had an airport level where the goal was to stop terrorists bombing the plane. We had to scramble and change it to stopping pickpockets".

== Reception ==
Chester Barber of Next Generation gave five stars out of five for PlayStation 2 version, highly praising the gameplay, new tricks to perform, graphics and controls.

Reception

Aggregate score
Aggregator	Score
Metacritic	(PS) 87/100 (PC) 90/100 (PS2) 97/100 (GCN) 91/100 (XBOX) 93/100 (GBA) 90/100

Review scores
Publication	Score
Eurogamer	(PS2) 8/10 (XBOX) 8/10 (GBA) 9/10
GameRevolution	(GCN) 9/10
GameSpot	(PS) 9/10 (N64) 8.1/10 (PC) 9/10 (PS2) 10/10 (GCN) 9/10 (XBOX) 9.6/10 (GBA) 9.5/10
IGN	(PS) 9.6/10 (PC) 9.3/10 (PS2) 9.7/10 (GCN) 9.1/10 (XBOX) 9.5/10 (GBA) 9.6/10
Nintendo World Report	(GCN) 9/10

By July 2006, the PlayStation 2 version of Tony Hawk's Pro Skater 3 had sold 2.1 million copies and earned $77 million in the United States. Next Generation ranked it as the 14th highest-selling game launched for the PlayStation 2, Xbox or GameCube between January 2000 and July 2006 in the country. Combined sales of Tony Hawk console games released in the 2000s reached 10.7 million units in the U.S. by July 2006. Its PlayStation 2 version also received a "Platinum" sales award from the British Entertainment and Leisure Software Publishers Association (ELSPA), indicating sales of at least 300,000 copies in the country.

The PS2 version earned a rare perfect 10 score from Jeff Gerstmann of GameSpot (one of only 30 titles to earn this award in GameSpot's history), who stated that the game "makes everything before it almost unplayable by comparison". GameSpot named Tony Hawk's Pro Skater 3 the best PlayStation game, best alternative sports console game and overall second-best console game of 2001. It was also nominated for the publication's annual "Best GameCube Game" and "Best PlayStation 2 Game" awards. It was also awarded the best sports game award at E3 2001. IGN rated the game 9.7/10, stating that the game "should go down in history as one of the best twitch-fests on PlayStation 2". The game is currently the top rated PS2 game on the review aggregate website Metacritic, with an average score of 97/100, tying with Grand Theft Auto III. Famitsu gave the game a 30/40.

Tony Hawk's Pro Skater 3 was a runner-up for GameSpot's 2002 "Best Sports Game on PC" award, which went to Madden NFL 2003. It won the publication's 2002 "Best Sports Game on Game Boy Advance" award, and was a runner-up for "Game of the Year on Game Boy Advance". During the 5th Annual Interactive Achievement Awards, Tony Hawk's Pro Skater 3 was honored with the "Console Sports" award by the Academy of Interactive Arts & Sciences; it also received nominations for outstanding achievement in "Animation" and "Visual Engineering".

== Awards ==
- E3 2001 Game Critics Awards: Best Sports Game
- 2002 Interactive Achievement Awards: Console Sports Game of the Year

== Sequel ==
A fourth game in the series, titled Pro Skater 4, was released the following year in October 2002.
