= 2002 FIFA World Cup (video game) =

2002 video game

- North American PC cover art
- Developers: EA Canada; Creations; Intelligent Games (all versions except PS); Tose Software (GC)
- Publishers: NA/EU: EA Sports; JP: Electronic Arts Square
- Series: FIFA World Cup
- Platforms: PlayStation 2, Xbox, Microsoft Windows, PlayStation, GameCube
- Release: PlayStation 2 & Xbox: NA: 22 April 2002; EU: 26 April 2002; JP: 2 May 2002; PlayStation & Windows: EU: 26 April 2002; NA: 30 April 2002; GameCube: NA: 30 April 2002; JP: 2 May 2002; EU: 3 May 2002
- Genre: Sports
- Modes: Single-player, Multiplayer

2002 FIFA World Cup, sometimes known as FIFA World Cup 2002, is the second EA Sports official World Cup video game and tie-in to the 2002 FIFA World Cup, released for GameCube, Microsoft Windows, PlayStation, PlayStation 2 and Xbox. It was developed by EA Canada and Creations, with Intelligent Games assisting the development of the PC and sixth-generation console versions, with additional assistance from Tose Software for the GameCube version. The game was published by EA Sports in North America and Europe and published by Electronic Arts Square in Japan. The GameCube version was a launch title for the system in Europe.

== Overview ==
A stepping stone between the game engines of FIFA Football 2002 and FIFA Football 2003, the game still incorporates the power bar for shots and crosses but with a steeper learning curve and customisation of the chances of being penalised by the match referee. Some kits are licensed, along with the player likeness and the stadia of the 2002 FIFA World Cup. Unlike the previous games in the FIFA series, the game had an original soundtrack composed by Bob Buckley and performed by the Vancouver Symphony Orchestra, although "Anthem" by Vangelis is used as one of the match entrance fanfares.

== Reception ==
Reception

Aggregate scores
Aggregator	Score
GameRankings	(PC) 79% (PS2) 76.58% (Xbox) 76.05% (GC) 73.59% (PS) 68.75%
Metacritic	(PC) 80/100 (Xbox) 79/100 (GC) 78/100 (PS) 77/100 (PS2) 73/100

Review scores
Publication	Score
Electronic Gaming Monthly	5.5/10
Eurogamer	6/10
Famitsu	30/40
Game Informer	8/10
GamePro	(Xbox) 4.5/5; 3.5/5
GameRevolution	(Xbox) B (PS2) B−
GameSpot	(PC) 8.8/10 (Xbox) 8/10; 7.4/10 (PS) 6.8/10
GameSpy	(GC) 85% (Xbox) 83%
GameZone	(PC) 9.2/10; 8.5/10 (GC) 8/10
IGN	(PC) 9.3/10 (PS2) 8.3/10; 8.2/10
Nintendo Power	4.3/5
Official U.S. PlayStation Magazine	4/5
Official Xbox Magazine (US)	8.3/10
PC Gamer (US)	56%

2002 FIFA World Cup was met with positive to average reception. GameRankings and Metacritic gave it a score of 79% and 80 out of 100 for the PC version; 76.58% and 73 out of 100 for the PlayStation 2 version; 76.05% and 79 out of 100 for the Xbox version; 73.59% and 78 out of 100 for the GameCube version; and 68.75% and 77 out of 100 for the PlayStation version. In Japan, Famitsu gave the GameCube, PS2, and Xbox versions each a score of 30 out of 40.

The PlayStation 2 version of 2002 FIFA World Cup received a "Gold" sales award from the Entertainment and Leisure Software Publishers Association (ELSPA), indicating sales of at least 200,000 copies in the United Kingdom. The game was an immediate hit in Italy, with sales of 90,000 units across all platforms within one day of release.

The game sold 3.5 million copies by October 2002.

== Lawsuit ==
Bayern Munich and German international goalkeeper Oliver Kahn successfully sued Electronic Arts for their inclusion of him in the game without his prior consent despite EA reaching an agreement with FIFPro, the body that represents all FIFA players. As a result, EA was banned from selling copies of the game in Germany and was forced to financially compensate Kahn.

== See also ==
- 2002 FIFA World Cup
- World Cup 98 (video game)
- FIFA World Cup video games
