= MLB Slugfest 2003 =

2002 video game

- Developers: Midway Sports (PS2); Gratuitous Games (GC, Xbox)
- Publisher: Midway Sports
- Series: MLB Slugfest
- Platforms: PlayStation 2, Xbox, GameCube
- Release: PlayStation 2: NA: June 24, 2002; Xbox: NA: August 26, 2002; GameCube: NA: September 4, 2002
- Genre: Sports (baseball)
- Modes: Single-player, multiplayer

MLB Slugfest 2003, often stylized as MLB Slugfest 20-03, is a baseball video game published by Midway Sports in 2002 for the PlayStation 2, Xbox and GameCube. It is the first game in the MLB Slugfest series. Alex Rodriguez from the Texas Rangers is the cover athlete.

== Reception ==
Reception

Aggregate score
Aggregator	Score		
Aggregator	GameCube	PS2	Xbox
Metacritic	80/100	77/100	79/100

Review scores
Publication	Score		
Publication	GameCube	PS2	Xbox
AllGame	N/A	3/5	3/5
Electronic Gaming Monthly	N/A	7.17/10	N/A
Game Informer	N/A	7.75/10	N/A
GameRevolution	N/A	B	N/A
GameSpot	8.1/10	8.1/10	8.1/10
GameSpy	3.5/5	73%	N/A
GameZone	8.6/10	8.2/10	8.4/10
IGN	8.2/10	8.3/10	8.1/10
Nintendo Power	3.8/5	N/A	N/A
Official U.S. PlayStation Magazine	N/A	4/5	N/A
Official Xbox Magazine (US)	N/A	N/A	8.6/10
X-Play	N/A	4/5	N/A
Maxim	N/A	N/A	5/5

The game received "generally favorable reviews" on all platforms according to the review aggregation website Metacritic. Maxim gave the Xbox version universal acclaim in its early review, nearly three months before said console version was released Stateside.

The game was nominated for the "Best Alternative Sports Game on GameCube" and "Best Alternative Sports Game on Xbox" awards at GameSpot's Best and Worst of 2002 Awards, both of which went to Tony Hawk's Pro Skater 4.
