= Circus Maximus: Chariot Wars =

2002 racing video game

- Developer: Kodiak Interactive
- Publishers: NA: Encore; EU: THQ
- Platforms: PlayStation 2, Xbox
- Release: Xbox: NA: February 26, 2002; EU: June 28, 2002; PlayStation 2: EU: July 5, 2002
- Genre: Racing
- Mode: Single-player

Circus Maximus: Chariot Wars (also simply called Circus Maximus) is a 2002 video game set in Ancient Rome featuring chariot racing. Players compete against other chariots, each with a horse and a gladiator, and in death matches where players use their gladiator to fight others to the death. The game takes its name from the Circus Maximus outdoor race track in Rome.

The game is most remembered for gameplay that offered a combination of realistic Roman history and chariot driving with combat sequences.

== Reception ==
Reception

Aggregate score
| Aggregator | Score |
|---|---|
| Metacritic | 67/100 |

Review scores
| Publication | Score |
|---|---|
| AllGame | 3/5 |
| Electronic Gaming Monthly | 3/10 |
| Game Informer | 6/10 |
| GamePro | 5/5 |
| GameRevolution | C |
| GameSpot | 6.2/10 |
| GameSpy | 76% |
| GameZone | 7.5/10 |
| IGN | 3.8/10 |
| Official Xbox Magazine (US) | 6.5/10 |
| The Cincinnati Enquirer | 3.5/5 |
| Playboy | 70% |

The Xbox version received "average" reviews according to the review aggregation website Metacritic. Maxim gave it a score of eight out of ten and said that the game "earns laurels for putting players in simultaneous control of a driver and a passenger who can use a whip or a sword to turn opponents into Caesar salad." However, The Cincinnati Enquirer gave it three-and-a-half stars out of five and said that it was "fun, but only after you master the steep learning curve. The game is tough to learn because all of its controls — buttons, triggers and thumbsticks — must be used for practically any race." Playboy gave it a similar score of 70% and said that it "scores points for an original theme coupled with fresh play mechanics. It then promptly loses them to poor execution."
