= Wreckless: The Yakuza Missions =

2002 video game

- North American PlayStation 2 cover art
- Developers: Bunkasha (Xbox); Stealth Studios (PS2); Broadsword Interactive Limited (GCN)
- Publishers: JP: Bunkasha; NA/PAL: Activision
- Composer: Hajime Fukuma
- Engine: T-Total (PS2)
- Platforms: Xbox, PlayStation 2, GameCube
- Release: Xbox: NA: February 5, 2002; JP: February 22, 2002; PAL: March 14, 2002; GameCube, PS2: NA: November 20, 2002; PAL: November 22, 2002
- Genre: Racing
- Mode: Single-player

Wreckless: The Yakuza Missions, known in Japan as Double S.T.E.A.L. (ダブル・スティール, Daburu Sutīru), is a 2002 racing video game originally released on the Xbox and later for GameCube and PlayStation 2, using Traveller's Tales' in-house game engine, under the codename "T-Total", on the latter platform. The game is set in Hong Kong, in which the player completes missions.

The game was specifically developed for Xbox rather than being a port and was well-received. The GameCube and PlayStation 2 versions suffered from performance issues and did not sell well. On August 4, 2005, a Japan-only sequel was released for the Xbox called Double S.T.E.A.L. The Second Clash (ダブル スティール THE SECOND CLASH, Daburu Sutīru The Second Clash). The sequel had online leaderboard support via Xbox Live. Online support was terminated in 2010, however, revival online servers such as Insignia have restored online functionality.

== Plot ==
In the game, set in Hong Kong, the player plays as either part of a corrupt police unit attempting to crack down on rival yakuza operations, or as a pair of spies hired to take down Tiger Takagi, the head of the Hong Kong yakuza.

== Reception ==
=== Wreckless: The Yakuza Missions ===
Wreckless: The Yakuza Missions

Aggregate score
Aggregator	Score		
Aggregator	GameCube	PS2	Xbox
Metacritic	58/100	60/100	74/100

Review scores
Publication	Score		
Publication	GameCube	PS2	Xbox
AllGame	N/A	N/A	2.5/5
Edge	N/A	N/A	4/10
Electronic Gaming Monthly	N/A	N/A	7.5/10 (Note: Three critics of Electronic Gaming Monthly gave the Xbox version each a score of 7.5/10, 7/10, and 8/10.)
EP Daily	N/A	N/A	7.5/10
Famitsu	N/A	N/A	26/40
Game Informer	7.75/10	7.75/10	7/10
GameRevolution	N/A	N/A	B−
GameSpot	5.4/10	5.6/10	6.8/10
GameSpy	1/5	1/5	86%
IGN	6.8/10	6.8/10	9/10
Nintendo Power	3.8/5	N/A	N/A
Nintendo World Report	6.5/10	N/A	N/A
Official U.S. PlayStation Magazine	N/A	2/5	N/A
Official Xbox Magazine (US)	N/A	N/A	9.1/10
FHM	N/A	N/A	4/5

The game received "mixed or average reviews" on all platforms according to the review aggregation website Metacritic. In Japan, Famitsu gave the Xbox version a score of two sevens and two sixes for a total of 26 out of 40.

Michael "Major Mike" Weigand of GamePro's May 2002 issue called the Xbox version "a solid offering for gamers on the prowl for action-seasoned driving. If you liked Driver and Spy Hunter, make Wreckless: The Yakuza Missions your next challenge." (Note: GamePro gave the Xbox version 4/5 for graphics, sound, control, and fun factor.) Ten issues later, however, Fennec Fox said of the other two console versions, "Hopefully, we've learned that most launch games should not be touched after the launch is over. The new Wreckless may have more missions (which get boring after a while), a free-roam mode (which you can only unlock by completing the game, so there's little point), and the ability to run over pedestrians (big whoop), but the fact is that there are games on both the PS2 and GameCube that easily outclass this one in everything it sets out to do." (Note: GamePro gave the GameCube and PlayStation 2 versions each two 2.5/5 scores for graphics and sound, 4.5/5 for control, and 3/5 for fun factor.)

Extended Play gave the Xbox version three stars out of five, saying, "While Wreckless is a fun game, it certainly will not appeal to all gamers. Fans of action-driving titles will enjoy the game's fast-paced feel and crisp graphics, but the game's shortcomings ultimately keep it from achieving the classic status of a game such as Twisted Metal. However, for those who like their games unique (or are big fans of Hong Kong Cinema), there are some thrills to be had, which could earn Wreckless a cult following." Louis Bedigian of GameZone gave the same console version 9.5 out of 10, saying, "The controls are nearly perfect. I have never played a driving game with such precise controls before." However, Michael Lafferty gave the GameCube version seven out of ten, calling it "an average arcade demolition game that does have a good range of features but suffers from game play that is basically the same thing over and over." Natalie Romano gave the PlayStation 2 version a similar score of seven out of ten, calling it an "extremely fun game that loses it[s] charms way too quickly."

Eurogamer find the game "so rubbish, that we didn't even review it"

The Xbox version was nominated for the "Best Graphics (Technical) on Xbox" award at GameSpot's Best and Worst of 2002 Awards, which went to Tom Clancy's Splinter Cell.

=== Double S.T.E.A.L. The Second Clash ===
Double S.T.E.A.L. The Second Clash

Review scores
Publication	Score
Edge	4/10
Famitsu	(Xbox) 34/40; 27/40

The sequel received more mixed reviews than the original. In Japan, Famitsu gave it a score of two sevens, one six and one seven, while Famitsu Xbox gave it one nine, one eight, one nine, and one eight.
