= Toxic Grind =

2002 video game

- Developer: Blue Shift Inc.
- Publisher: THQ
- Engine: RenderWare
- Platform: Xbox
- Release: NA: October 21, 2002; UK: November 8, 2002
- Genre: Extreme sports
- Modes: Single Player, Multiplayer

Toxic Grind is an extreme sports game developed by Blue Shift Inc. and released by THQ for the Xbox in 2002. Described as the "only BMX game with a storyline" by the developers, Toxic Grind is a narrative BMX-based game in which players complete a series of missions within a futuristic game show over eleven levels. Similar to other extreme sports games of its type, the game features levels designed for players to complete tricks and avoid obstacles. Toxic Grind was originally planned for a multiplatform release with a GameCube port, although only the Xbox version reached release. The game was released to generally negative reviews, with critics mixed on the merits of the story additions to the game and the gameplay mechanics and control scheme.

== Gameplay ==
A screenshot of gameplay in Toxic Grind.

Toxic Grind is an extreme sports game in which the player navigates a BMX across 11 stages, whilst completing missions and avoiding obstacles. Similar to other games of its type, players can execute tricks including vert tricks, grinds, and wallrides to earn points, with combos earning increased points and allowing special "adrenaline tricks" to be performed. Control of the player's BMX is also similar to other games, with buttons assigned to hops, loop tricks, grind tricks, and holds. The game features several modes, including 'Underground', a story mode involving the completion of a series of missions to unlock new levels, 'Arcade', a free play mode for unlocked levels, and 'Pro Circuit', a mode involving play over a series of levels in a competition to earn the best average score. The game also supports a multiplayer mode, featuring 'Quick Draw', requiring players to beat the other to a specified score, 'Score War', play to reach the highest score in the time limit, 'Turf War', requiring players to touch more items in the level than their competitor, and 'Tug of War', in which players earn and steal points from each other by performing tricks.

== Synopsis ==
In the year 2097, BMX riding has been outlawed, with violators of the law sentenced to appear on "Toxic Grind", a game show hosted by host Dixon Von Blass. On the show, contestants are injected with a deadly toxin, ensuring certain death. However, in order to enhance the show's ratings, the host decides to use time travel kidnap Jason Hayes, one of the world's best freestyle BMX riders, to showcase on the show. Jason is faced with a gauntlet of deadly objectives and obstacles in order to survive the show and become the savior of BMX.

== Development ==
THQ announced Toxic Grind in January 2002 for the Xbox and GameCube, marketing the game as a "unique take on extreme sports" and the "first mission-based BMX game with a storyline". However, work on a GameCube version of Toxic Grind was cancelled during development, with THQ identifying the game as a "better fit" for the Xbox. Initial previews of Toxic Grind in early 2002 encountered criticism with the demo's slow framerate, with IGN stating the game "proved sluggish and in need of serious tweaking", and was a "visible shortcoming" with the framerate "dropping below 30 regularly". Blue Shift involved additional staff, including developer Richard Geldreich, to "fix up and optimise the rendering, shader and shadowing code" affecting the game's framerate, with the game optimised "at the last minute" prior to release.

== Reception ==
Reception

Aggregate score
| Aggregator | Score |
|---|---|
| Metacritic | 49% |

Review scores
| Publication | Score |
|---|---|
| GameSpot | 3/10 |
| IGN | 4.9 |
| Xbox Magazine (XBM) | 6/10 |
| Xbox Nation (XBN) | 2/10 |

Toxic Grind received "generally unfavorable" reviews from critics, according to review aggregator Metacritic, with an average score of 49% across 9 reviews. Reviewers were mixed on the premise and story of the game, with positive reviews praising the originality of the game's approach. Jeff Gerstmann of GameSpot praised the "funny and inventive premise" of the game, noting "the creative story is told pretty well using a series of static images and decent voice-over." Justin Raymond of GameZone was mixed, stating whilst he "applauded (the game) for trying something new, the story feels very corny...the cutscenes (consist) of static figures and voice-overs - they feel kind of cheap and crude." In contrast, IGN found the story scenes to be "dull", critiquing the acting as "laughable" and stated it "doesn't help this game much and only seems to make this game more campy and cheap." Sam Bishop of Xbox Nation described the story as "painfully bad" and critiqued its "hackneyed premise".

Reviewers were also mixed on the gameplay and controls. Describing the game as ranking among "the worst we've ever come across", Sam Bishop of Xbox Nation critiqued the game's "unresponsive and sloppy control scheme", focusing upon the "utterly unintuitive and disruptive process" of manuals and tricks "that consistently ruin the process of trick combos". Jeff Gerstmann of GameSpot critiqued the game's physics as "painfully unfinished", stating "you never really feel like you're catching the right amount of air...everything about the way the game moves has a very clunky look and feel to it." Similarly, Kendall Lacey of Xbox Magazine stated that the game was "not very exciting" and "never manages to convey any real sense of movement." However, Justin Raymond of GameZone acknowledged "the actual gameplay can be pretty fun", praising the controls as "tight" and "easy to pull off and link together."
