= Taz: Wanted =

2002 video game

- Developer: Blitz Games
- Publisher: Infogrames
- Director: Jon Cartwright
- Producer: Team Phoenix
- Designer: Scott West
- Programmers: Claude Dareau; Philip Palmer; Nigel Higgs; John Weeks
- Artists: Chris Southall; Marc Buckingham; David Webb
- Composer: Marc Canham
- Engine: BlitzTech
- Platforms: GameCube; PlayStation 2 Windows; Xbox
- Release: 17 September 2002: PlayStation 2, Xbox; NA: 17 September 2002; EU: 27 September 2002; AU: 18 October 2002 Windows; EU: 27 September 2002; NA: 1 October 2002; AU: 18 October 2002 GameCube; EU: 4 October 2002; NA: 8 October 2002; AU: 18 October 2002
- Genre: Platform
- Modes: Single-player, multiplayer

Taz: Wanted is a platform video game released in 2002 by Blitz Games. The game features the Looney Tunes character the Tasmanian Devil.

== Plot ==
Taz and She-Devil are hanging out romantically on Taz Island, but are suddenly captured by Yosemite Sam and held captive in Yosemite Zoo; Taz is kept in a large cage in the center of the zoo while She-Devil is still in a smaller cage in a truck. While Sam films an advertisement for the zoo on TV, Taz attempts to break out his cage, and Sam has She-Devil moved to a safer area of the zoo. After Taz breaks out, Sam has his "Taz Catcher" workers put up wanted posters and post a bounty to help catch Taz. Tweety appears and agrees to help Taz in his journey to save She-Devil, giving him pointers on where the wanted posters Taz needs to destroy are found.

After going through the zoo's safari, winter, and beach-themed attractions and destroying all of the wanted posters strewn throughout, Taz nearly escapes the zoo using a snowblower, an inflatable raft, and an escaped elephant found in said locations. However, Taz soon finds himself having to battle Gossamer in a game of Elephant Pong. When Taz wins, Sam retreats and moves She-Devil again. Taz chases after them, reaching the town of "Sam" Francisco. After evading capture from Sam's workers again, Taz sees Sam advertising She-Devil as the prize on the game show "Gladiatoons", prompting Taz to find a way into the show.

After causing chaos and destroying the wanted posters at the local museum, shopping mall, and construction site, Taz uses an unstable cement mixer from the site to launch himself into the Gladiatoons set. Taz then takes Wile E. Coyote's place in the main competition against the champion, Daffy Duck. Taz eventually emerges victorious against Daffy, but when Taz is placed on the winner's podium, Daffy throws a switch that causes the podium to trap Taz in a cage. After Daffy claims the bounty on Taz, Sam and his workers then take the captive Devil and transport him by train to the Old West. Upon reaching the train station in the desert, Taz manages to break free yet again. He then sees Sam's blimp lower him and She-Devil into an explosives warehouse on an otherwise unreachable butte.

Taz goes on to destroy the wanted posters throughout a local canyon town, a haunted theme park locale, and a large underground strip mine, eventually gaining access to a mine cart in the process. Taz then rides the cart and launches himself into the factory and confronts Sam. Sam uses dynamite in an attempt to blow up Taz, but ends up causing the warehouse to explode in the process. Sam escapes in his blimp with She-Devil, but the explosion has such force that it hurls Taz into outer space and eventually back on his island, where Sam is trying to build a theme park over it.

Taz catches up to Sam, where he is attempting to destroy the entire island by detonating a large amount of explosives in a volcano. Taz defeats Sam, causing him to fall into the lava. However, Sam managed to save himself thanks to a hidden jetpack, and escapes. As Taz and She-Devil are raised into Sam's blimp, which in en route back to Yosemite Zoo, Tweety suddenly appears operating a large mech, much to Taz's confusion. Tweety reveals that it was his idea to construct the 'Tazland A-maze-ment Park' all along, and battles Taz throughout the blimp. The battle eventually culminates with Taz opening the blimp's rear cargo door, and yelling with such audible force that it pushes Tweety out of the blimp, defeating him. She-Devil then appears, having broken out on her own, and shares a brief kissing session with Taz. She-Devil then tries to pilot the blimp from the cockpit to take them home to their island, but Taz accidentally destroys the control panel when he bursts in, causing the craft to crash on the island. She-Devil then hands Taz a broom to clean up, much to Taz's annoyance.

== Gameplay ==
Taz: Wanted has four areas, the first three having the same basic blueprint. There are three levels in each area, each level having seven wanted posters of some variety that must be destroyed with some technique. Once all seven posters are destroyed, a scene will show an area of the level in which something happens that will help Taz get to the new area, such as a gate opening or something breaking. In the new area, Taz gets his hands on something and somehow manages to get it and him back to the HUB. Once the three things are acquired for the area, they can be used to enter a boss arena. The only exception for this is the level Taz Land, in which nothing is brought back, and the final area, with only one level and two bosses. Once the boss is defeated Taz is either blown, shipped, or chased to the next area. To travel between areas, a misplaced door is placed in each one which transports you to Planet X with all the other doors Taz can travel through. Defeating bosses unlocks their arenas for two-player mode.

== Reception ==
Reception

Aggregate score
Aggregator	Score
Metacritic	(PS2) 65/100 (Xbox) 62/100 (GC) 61/100 (PC) 58/100

Review scores
Publication	Score
AllGame	2.5/5
GameSpot	(PC) 5.1/10; 5/10
GameZone	7.2/10 (PS2) 7/10 (Xbox) 6.9/10
IGN	(PS2) 6.7/10 (Xbox) 6.5/10 (PC) 6.2/10 (GC) 5.7/10
NGC Magazine	52%
Nintendo Power	3/5
Official U.S. PlayStation Magazine	3.5/5
Official Xbox Magazine (US)	5.6/10
PC Zone	66%
X-Play	3/5

Taz: Wanted received "mixed or average" reviews, according to review aggregator Metacritic

The game was nominated for 2002 BAFTA award in category 'Best Children's Entertainment'.
