= Law 3037/2002 =

Repealed Greek legislation outlawing electronic games

Law 3037/2002 was a controversial law passed by the Greek government in 2002 and was later repealed in 2011. The law effectively banned all electronic games in public places in the hopes that it would fight illegal gambling in the country. The bill was formulated after a member of the ruling Panhellenic Socialist Movement (PASOK) political party was videotaped in an illegal gambling establishment, resulting in public hysteria that was fueled by sensationalist reporting in the press. The bill was passed on 29 July 2002 to take effect with its publication in the Government Gazette, pursuant to the enabling article.

During a case against some Internet café owners who allowed their customers to play online chess and other games, a local court in Thessaloniki declared the law unconstitutional. More than 300 people gathered outside the court in support of the Internet café owners. The law affected both Greek citizens and foreigners. The European Commission sent an official letter to the Greek Foreign Ministry explaining that the law may be in conflict with European legislation and, if that were the case, action could be taken against Greece by the European Court of Justice.

On September 24, 2002, government officials published a document in an effort to clarify the controversial articles of the law. After the European Union intervention and debates Internet café owners, the government passed a new decision (1107414/1491/T. & E. F.), published in the Government Gazette issue 1827, on December 8, 2003. The new law clarified some articles of 3037/2002 but still banned video games in internet cafés and computer software which deleted or encrypted files on hard disks of computers owned by Internet cafés. The Greek police raided Internet cafes in Larissa on January 14, 2004, as reported by Eleftherotypia newspaper. Eighty computers were taken by the police as evidence, and three Internet café owners were arrested. The European Commission in February 2005 referred Greece to the European Court of Justice over its ban on electronic games.

The law 3037/2002 was repealed in 2011, by the article 54 of law 4002/2011 ΦΕΚ Α/180/22-8-2011.
