= ESPN NBA 2Night 2002 =

2002 video game

- North American cover art
- Developer: Konami Computer Entertainment Osaka
- Publisher: Konami
- Director: Kazuo Iwasaki
- Producer: Kazutomo Terada
- Composers: Kazuhiko Uehara; Shigeru Araki
- Platforms: PlayStation 2, Xbox
- Release: NA: February 26, 2002 (PS2); JP: March 28, 2002; NA: April 16, 2002 (Xbox); EU: May 3, 2002 (PS2)
- Genre: Sports
- Modes: Single-player, multiplayer

ESPN NBA 2Night 2002 is a video game in the ESPN NBA 2Night Basketball franchise, developed by Konami and released for PlayStation 2 and Xbox. It is a sequel to ESPN NBA 2Night, which had been released for Dreamcast in 2000 and PlayStation 2 in 2001.

== Teams ==
- Atlanta Hawks
- Boston Celtics
- Chicago Bulls
- Cleveland Cavaliers
- Golden State Warriors
- Los Angeles Clippers
- Los Angeles Lakers
- Brooklyn Nets
- New York Knicks

== Modes ==
- Exhibition
- Season
- Playoffs
- Franchise

== Reception ==
Reception

Aggregate score
| Aggregator | Score | |
| Aggregator | PS2 | Xbox |
|---|---|---|
| Metacritic | 59/100 | 52/100 |

Review scores
| Publication | Score | |
| Publication | PS2 | Xbox |
|---|---|---|
| EP Daily | 7.5/10 | N/A |
| Famitsu | 30/40 | 30/40 |
| Game Informer | 7.5/10 | 6.25/10 |
| GameRevolution | D+ | N/A |
| GameSpot | 5/10 | N/A |
| GameSpy | 55% | N/A |
| GameZone | 7/10 | N/A |
| IGN | 5.7/10 | N/A |
| Official U.S. PlayStation Magazine | 3/5 | N/A |
| Official Xbox Magazine (US) | N/A | 4.2/10 |

The game received "mixed" reviews on both platforms according to the review aggregation website Metacritic. In Japan, Famitsu gave it a score of 30 out of 40 on both platforms.
