= Salt Lake 2002 (video game) =

2002 sports video game

- Developers: Attention to Detail; DC Studios (GBA)
- Publishers: Eidos Interactive; Ubi Soft (GBA)
- Platforms: Windows, PlayStation 2, Game Boy Advance
- Release: Windows, PlayStation 2: EU: 18 January 2002; NA: 25 January 2002 (PC); NA: 30 January 2002 (PS2); Game Boy Advance: NA: 31 January 2002; EU: 8 February 2002
- Genre: Sports
- Modes: Single-player, multiplayer

Salt Lake 2002 is the official video game of the XIX Olympic Winter Games, hosted by Salt Lake City, Utah, United States in 2002. Developed by Attention to Detail and published by Eidos Interactive (DC Studios/Ubi Soft for the Game Boy Advance version), it was released for Windows, PlayStation 2 and Game Boy Advance. An Xbox version was also planned but cancelled.

== Competition ==
There are four game modes: Olympic, Tournament, Classic and Time Trial. The Olympic Mode returns to the simplistic direct-to-competition mode, unlike Sydney 2000 that forced the player to qualify for the Olympics. Each players' victories are logged, and trophies/medals can be seen in a trophy room. Gameplay-wise, the events are unevenly done. While the downhill/slalom events are reasonably simulated and playable (one can play downhill in first person view, and at easier levels missing a gate in the slalom does not disqualify the player), in ski jump and bobsleigh results are generally hard to predict or control.

== Playable nations ==
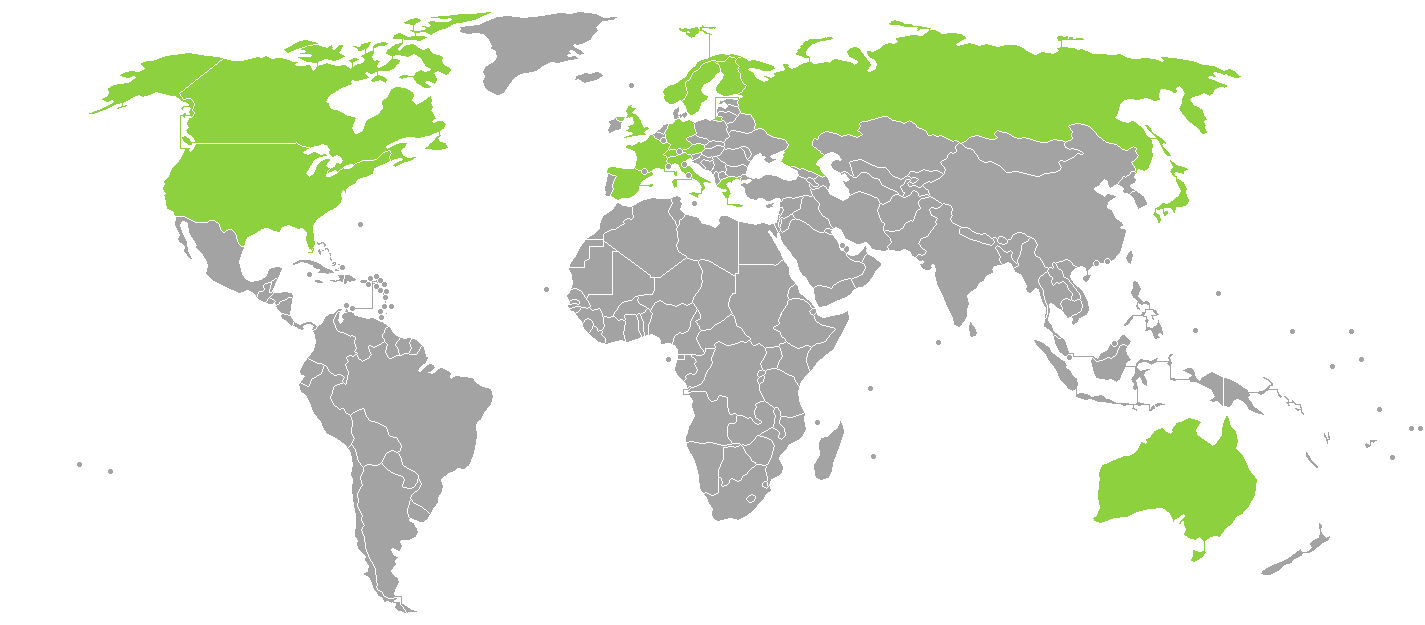
Playable countries

There is a total of 16 playable countries in the game. They are:

- Australia
- Austria
- Canada
- Finland
- France
- Great Britain
- Germany
- Greece
- Italy
- Japan
- Norway
- Russia
- Spain
- Sweden
- Switzerland
- United States

== Events ==
- Men's Alpine Skiing Downhill
- Women's Alpine Skiing Slalom
- Women's Freestyle Skiing Aerials
- Men's Ski Jump K120 Individual
- Men's Two-man Bobsleigh
- Men's Snowboard Parallel Giant Slalom
- Curling

== Reception ==
Reception

Aggregate score
Aggregator	Score		
Aggregator	GBA	PC	PS2
Metacritic	55/100	44/100	49/100

Review scores
Publication	Score		
Publication	GBA	PC	PS2
Computer Games Magazine	N/A	2.5/5	N/A
Computer Gaming World	N/A	2/5	N/A
Famitsu	N/A	N/A	25/40
Game Informer	5/10	N/A	N/A
GameSpot	N/A	6.3/10	N/A
GameZone	9/10	7.5/10	7.6/10
IGN	5.1/10	2/10	2/10
Nintendo Power	2/5	N/A	N/A
Official U.S. PlayStation Magazine	N/A	N/A	2.5/5
PC Gamer (US)	N/A	35%	N/A
BBC Sport	N/A	N/A	82%
Maxim	N/A	N/A	2/10

The Game Boy Advance version of Salt Lake 2002 received "mixed" reviews, while the PC and PlayStation 2 versions received "generally unfavorable reviews", according to the review aggregation website Metacritic. In Japan, where the PS2 version was ported for release on 28 February 2002, Famitsu gave it a score of 25 out of 40.
