= UFC: Throwdown =

2002 video game

- North American PlayStation 2 cover art
- Developer: Opus
- Publishers: NA: Crave Entertainment; JP: Capcom; EU: Crave/Ubi Soft
- Producers: Taka Suzuki; Takeshi Shimizu
- Designer: Koji Ishizeki
- Programmer: Shoichi Iwasaki
- Composer: Jun Enoki
- Platforms: PlayStation 2, GameCube
- Release: PlayStation 2: NA: June 4, 2002; JP: August 1, 2002; PAL: September 6, 2002; GameCube: NA: July 30, 2002; JP: September 5, 2002; PAL: September 20, 2002
- Genres: Fighting, Sports
- Modes: Single-player multiplayer

UFC: Throwdown (full title: Ultimate Fighting Championship: Throwdown), known in Japan as UFC 2: Tapout (UFC2 タップアウト, UFC2 Tappuauto) on the PlayStation 2 and UFC 2 Tapout Final Spec. (UFC2 タップアウト ファイナルスペック, UFC2 Tappuauto Fainaru Supekku) on the GameCube, is a video game of the fighting game genre released in 2002 by Opus. The game is based on the Ultimate Fighting Championship. In Japan, the same name was used for the Xbox version of UFC: Tapout.

== Overview ==
There are five different game modes; "Career", "UFC Mode", "Arcade", "Tournament" and "Exhibition". Career mode involves creating a fighter, giving him a fighting style, completing a number of "skill challenges" to build up his attributes, then winning five sparring matches before you can enter an eight-man tournament. After the tournament is over, the player picks a new fighting style to learn, and completes the same process until it has been done five times.

In UFC Mode, the player picks a heavyweight or light-heavyweight fighter and must win four fights before having a title match. On winning, the player receives a silver belt, which can later become a gold belt if UFC Mode is completed again with the same fighter. There is also an open-weight division, where the player can face fighters from outside their weight class.

In arcade mode the player selects a fighter and must win ten consecutive fights. Up to eight people can compete in the Tournament mode. Exhibition mode consists of single 1 vs. 1 fights.

The game cover features UFC fighter, Tito Ortiz and the late Charles Lewis Jr., better known as Mask, the founder of the TapouT brand. The full roster includes 28 fighters.

== Reception ==
Reception

Aggregate score
| Aggregator | Score | |
| Aggregator | GameCube | PS2 |
|---|---|---|
| Metacritic | 67/100 | 68/100 |

Review scores
| Publication | Score | |
| Publication | GameCube | PS2 |
|---|---|---|
| AllGame | N/A | 2/5 |
| Electronic Gaming Monthly | N/A | 6.33/10 |
| Game Informer | N/A | 8.25/10 |
| GamePro | N/A | 3/5 |
| GameRevolution | N/A | C |
| GameSpot | 7.2/10 | 7.6/10 |
| GameSpy | 80% | 86% |
| GameZone | N/A | 7.8/10 |
| IGN | 6.7/10 | 7.4/10 |
| Nintendo Power | 2.6/5 | N/A |
| Official U.S. PlayStation Magazine | N/A | 2.5/5 |

The game received "average" reviews on both platforms according to the review aggregation website Metacritic.

== See also ==
- List of fighting games
