= FIFA Football 2003 =

- PAL region cover art, featuring (left to right) Real Madrid's Roberto Carlos (in the Brazil colors), Manchester United's Ryan Giggs and Juventus's Edgar Davids
- Developer: EA Canada (Note: Ported to PlayStation by EA UK. The Game Boy Advance version was developed by Exient Entertainment.)
- Publisher: EA Sports
- Artist: Ali Kojori(Animation Director)
- Series: FIFA
- Platforms: PlayStation; Microsoft Windows; Game Boy Advance; GameCube; PlayStation 2 Xbox
- Release: October 25, 2002: PC, PS, PS2, Xbox, GC; PAL: 25 October 2002 (PS2); PAL: 1 November 2002; NA: 2 November 2002 (PC); NA: 11 November 2002 (PS); NA: 12 November 2002 (Xbox); NA: 14 November 2002 (GC & PS2) Game Boy Advance; PAL: 15 November 2002; NA: 19 November 2002
- Genre: Sports game
- Modes: Single-player, multiplayer

FIFA Football 2003, known as FIFA Soccer 2003 in North America, and simply FIFA 2003 is a football simulation video game produced by Electronic Arts and released by EA Sports. It was released in 2002.

FIFA 2003 is the tenth game in the FIFA series and the eighth to be produced in 3D.

== Gameplay ==
A number of new features were added to improve upon the previous version. Club Championship Mode was introduced with the feature of playing against 17 of Europe's top clubs in their own stadiums and the fans singing their unique chants and songs. A TV-style broadcast package gives highlights at half-time and full-time, as well as comprehensive analysis. One of the most anticipated new features was EA Sport's "Freestyle Control" which allows the user to flick the ball on and lay it off to teammates. Other additions include greater likenesses of some of the more well-known players such as Thierry Henry and Ronaldinho, as well as realistic player responses.

== Players ==
The European cover features Roberto Carlos, Ryan Giggs, and Edgar Davids, representing Brazil, Manchester United and Juventus respectively. In the United States, Landon Donovan appeared on the cover alone.

The highest rated player in the game is the Italian midfielder Matteo Brighi, from Parma, with a rating of 97.

== Reception ==
Reception

Aggregate score
Aggregator	Score					
Aggregator	GBA	GameCube	PC	PS	PS2	Xbox
Metacritic	76/100	86/100	83/100	70/100	88/100	88/100

Review scores
Publication	Score					
Publication	GBA	GameCube	PC	PS	PS2	Xbox
AllGame	N/A	N/A	3.5/5	3.5/5	4/5	N/A
Eurogamer	6/10	N/A	N/A	N/A	9/10	N/A
Game Informer	N/A	8/10	N/A	N/A	N/A	N/A
GamePro	N/A	5/5	N/A	N/A	5/5	5/5
GameSpot	N/A	8.6/10	9.1/10	N/A	8.6/10	8.6/10
GameSpy	2.5/5	4/5	3/5	N/A	4.5/5	4/5
GameZone	N/A	9.3/10	9.4/10	N/A	8.2/10	9/10
IGN	8.8/10	8.4/10	7/10	N/A	8.3/10	8.4/10
Nintendo Power	3.9/5	3.9/5	N/A	N/A	N/A	N/A
Official U.S. PlayStation Magazine	N/A	N/A	N/A	3.5/5	5/5	N/A
Official Xbox Magazine (US)	N/A	N/A	N/A	N/A	N/A	8.8/10
PC Gamer (US)	N/A	N/A	78%	N/A	N/A	N/A
BBC Sport	N/A	N/A	N/A	N/A	86%	N/A

Upon release, FIFA 2003 was initially outsold by Pro Evolution Soccer 2 (PES2) in October 2002, but FIFA 2003 later overtook PES by December 2002, when FIFA had sold 2.5 million copies across Europe. The PlayStation 2 version of FIFA Football 2003 received a "Double Platinum" sales award from the Entertainment and Leisure Software Publishers Association (ELSPA), indicating sales of at least 600,000 copies in the United Kingdom.

The game received "generally favorable reviews" on all platforms except the PlayStation version, which received "average" reviews, according to the review aggregation website Metacritic. FIFA Football 2003 was a runner-up for GameSpot's annual "Best Sports Game on PC" award, which went to Madden NFL 2003.
