= Tony Hawk's Pro Skater 4 =

2002 video game

- Developers: Neversoft (Note: Ported to Windows and Mac OS X by Beenox); Vicarious Visions (PS, GBA) (Note: Game Boy Advance version ported to Tapwave Zodiac by Semi Logic Entertainments)
- Publisher: Activision (Note: Released under the Activision O2 Brand) (Note: Windows and Mac OS X versions published by Aspyr, mobile version co-published by JAMDAT and Activision, Tapwave Zodiac version published by Tapwave)
- Series: Tony Hawk's
- Platforms: PlayStation; PlayStation 2; Xbox; GameCube; Game Boy Advance; Windows; Mac OS X; Tapwave Zodiac; digiBLAST
- Release: October 23, 2002: GameCube, PlayStation, Xbox; NA: October 23, 2002; EU: November 15, 2002 Game Boy Advance, PlayStation 2; NA: October 23, 2002; EU: November 22, 2002 Windows, Mac OS X; NA: August 14, 2003; EU: August 2003 Mobile; NA: October 28, 2003 Tapwave Zodiac; NA: June 2004; UK: October 22, 2004
- Genre: Sports
- Modes: Single-player, multiplayer

Tony Hawk's Pro Skater 4 is a 2002 skateboarding game developed by Neversoft and published by Activision under their Activision O2 label. The game was ported by different developers to various systems. It is the fourth installment in the Tony Hawk's series. The game was released in 2002 for the GameCube, PlayStation, PlayStation 2, Xbox, and Game Boy Advance. In 2003, it was released for Windows and Mac OS X by developer Beenox and publisher Aspyr. In 2004, a Tapwave Zodiac version was released. Another port of the Game Boy Advance version was also released as a launch title for the digiBLAST, a Linux-based handheld console for children released in 2005.

A remake of the game is included as part of Tony Hawk's Pro Skater 3 + 4, released in 2025.

== Gameplay ==
An in-game screenshot of the PC version

Pro Skater 4 is a departure from the previous three games' Career mode, in which the player had a set amount of time in order to find and complete goals. 4 instead features a Career mode more similar to Free Skate mode, in which there is no time limit to explore the level, the goals are usually offered to the player to attempt by characters found in the level. This Career laid the foundation for the Story modes of the Underground series, American Wasteland, Project 8 and Proving Ground.

The game builds on the success of the gameplay in the previous games in the series. All of the combos from the previous game make an appearance, as well as some new tricks that can be performed to better navigate parks and areas. New to the game is the spine transfer, in which the player can press the shoulder button to transfer between quarter-pipes connected back-to-back, or otherwise self-right themselves to exit quarter-pipes or prevent bailing should they fly off them. The game also features skitching, which lets skaters hang off the back of moving vehicles.

The "hidden combos" for turning some tricks into slight variations in Pro Skater 3 turned into a standard feature, albeit not as advanced as the system would turn out in the next game in the series, where it was finalized. Also included was the ability to do grind and lip extensions by tapping a direction and grind while grinding or lipping, which can also grant the player bigger combos as they can do a grind extension into a special move, for example. As with trick extensions, this would be standard in the next game in the series where it was much simpler to do. The game is also the only one in the series where the player does not have to buy tricks. Instead, the basic trick-set the player gets is allocated depending on what type of move set the player defines for their character.

With broadband, a room of up to eight people can be hosted. With dial-up, a room up to three people can be hosted. Players with either connection can join any room.

- Trick Attack: The goal is to get as many points as possible. Whoever has the most points at the end wins.
- Graffiti: If one player does a trick on an object, that object changes color to the player's color. If another player does a bigger trick on it that is worth more points, they steal that object from other players. The one with the most tags wins.
- Combo Mambo: Almost the same as Trick Attack, except the highest number of points are done in one combo.
- King of the Hill: A capture the flag type of game wherein the player must hold a crown for as long as possible.
- Slap: The goal of the game is to hit each other. The faster skater will knock down the other.
- Free Skate: Practice.

=== Featured pro skaters and characters ===
The game features fourteen professional skateboarders, along with several unlockable original characters, depending on the version. Furthermore, the game features Jango Fett and Eddie (Iron Maiden's mascot) via licensing deals, as well as professional skater Mike Vallely and Daisy, a female skater visually based on and voiced by Jenna Jameson.

Featured pro skaters			Celebrity guest skaters	
Bob Burnquist; Steve Caballero; Kareem Campbell; Eric Koston; Rune Glifberg; Tony Hawk	Bucky Lasek; Bam Margera; Rodney Mullen; Chad Muska; Andrew Reynolds; Geoff Rowley	Elissa Steamer; Jamie Thomas; Mike Vallely^{a}	Jango Fett^{a}; Eddie^{a}; Daisy^{a}; Little Person^{b}; Mindy^{c}; Frycook^{c}	Roger^{c}; Momo^{c}

^a unlockable ^b PlayStation-exclusive ^c Game Boy Advance-exclusive

== Reception ==
Reception

Aggregate score
Aggregator	Score
Metacritic	(PC) 88/100 (PS2) 94/100 (GCN) 91/100 (XBOX) 90/100 (GBA) 85/100

Review scores
Publication	Score
Eurogamer	(PS2/XBOX) 8/10
GameSpot	(PC) 8.7/10 (PS2) 9.5/10 (GCN) 9.2/10 (XBOX) 9.3/10 (TWZ) 7.2/10 (GBA) 8.8/10
GameSpy	(PC) 4.5/5 (PS2) 5/5 (GCN) 4.5/5 (XBOX) 5/5
IGN	(PC) 9.2/10 (PS2) 9.3/10 (XBOX) 9/10 (GBA) 9.2/10
Nintendo Life	(GCN) 8/10
Nintendo World Report	(GCN) 9/10 (GBA) 8.5/10
Official U.S. PlayStation Magazine	(PS1) 8/10

The game received critical acclaim. IGN gave the Xbox version a 9/10, stating that "Tony Hawk 4 is by far the best skateboarding title around and head and shoulders above its 'me-too' competition". The PlayStation 2 version received the highest score from IGN, with a 9.3/10, commenting that though the graphics hadn't changed from its predecessor, the maps were much larger than in Pro Skater 3, along with praising the increased difficulty.

GameSpot named Pro Skater 4 the best Xbox game, and second-best PlayStation 2 and GameCube game, of October 2002. It later won GameSpot's annual "Best Alternative Sports Game on GameCube" and "Best Alternative Sports Game on Xbox" awards, and was nominated in the "Game of the Year on GameCube" and "Best Online Game on PlayStation 2" categories. During the 6th Annual Interactive Achievement Awards, Pro Skater 4 received a nomination for "Console Sports Game of the Year" by the Academy of Interactive Arts & Sciences.

=== Game Boy Advance version ===
GameSpot declared it the second-best Game Boy Advance game of November, behind Metroid Fusion, and a runner-up for the publication's annual "Best Sports Game on Game Boy Advance" award, which went to Tony Hawk's Pro Skater 3.

== Legacy ==
The career mode concept of Pro Skater 4 returned in 2003's Underground and saw continued use in the remainder of Neversoft's Tony Hawk's titles. A remake of Pro Skater 4 is included in Pro Skater 3 + 4, which was released in July 2025.
