= Madden NFL 2003 =

2002 video game

- North American cover art with Marshall Faulk
- Developers: EA Tiburon; Budcat Creations (PS, GBA)
- Publisher: EA Sports
- Series: Madden NFL
- Platforms: Game Boy Advance; GameCube; Windows; PlayStation; PlayStation 2 Xbox
- Release: NA: August 12, 2002; EU: September 27, 2002 (PC, Xbox); EU: October 4, 2002 (PS2); EU: October 11, 2002 (GC)
- Genre: Sports
- Modes: Single-player, multiplayer

Madden NFL 2003 is an American football simulation video game based on the NFL that was developed by EA Tiburon and Budcat Creations and published by EA Sports. The thirteenth installment of the Madden NFL series, the game features former St. Louis Rams running back Marshall Faulk on the cover. This edition of Madden was the first to have EA Trax, the Mini Camp mode, and to feature Al Michaels as play-by-play announcer, who took over for Pat Summerall. Although it featured the expansion Houston Texans and the relocation of the Seattle Seahawks to the NFC, it was actually the second to do so (after the previous edition had it done in the second season of its own Franchise mode, with the Seahawks still in the AFC and no Texans team when said mode was started). The game was released on August 12, 2002, for the Game Boy Advance, GameCube, Microsoft Windows, PlayStation, PlayStation 2 and Xbox. The PlayStation version also includes the Sega Genesis version of John Madden Football 93.

For the first time this game is not to feature Pat Summerall who retired from broadcasting until his death in 2013.

== Reception ==
Reception

Aggregate score
Aggregator	Score					
Aggregator	GBA	GameCube	PC	PS	PS2	Xbox
Metacritic	76/100	92/100	89/100	85/100	95/100	92/100

Review scores
Publication	Score					
Publication	GBA	GameCube	PC	PS	PS2	Xbox
AllGame	3/5	4/5	4.5/5	N/A	4/5	4/5
Computer Games Magazine	N/A	N/A	4.5/5	N/A	N/A	N/A
Computer Gaming World	N/A	N/A	5/5	N/A	N/A	N/A
Electronic Gaming Monthly	N/A	N/A	N/A	N/A	9.33/10	N/A
Game Informer	N/A	9.25/10	N/A	N/A	N/A	9.5/10
GamePro	N/A	5/5	N/A	N/A	5/5	5/5
GameSpot	7.5/10	8.6/10	9.2/10	N/A	9/10	8.6/10
GameSpy	N/A	N/A	4/5	N/A	N/A	91%
GameZone	N/A	N/A	N/A	N/A	9/10	N/A
IGN	8.2/10	8.8/10	9.2/10	N/A	9.1/10	8.8/10
Nintendo Power	N/A	4.2/5	N/A	N/A	N/A	N/A
Official U.S. PlayStation Magazine	N/A	N/A	N/A	4/5	5/5	N/A
Official Xbox Magazine (US)	N/A	N/A	N/A	N/A	N/A	8.8/10
PC Gamer (US)	N/A	N/A	74%	N/A	N/A	N/A
BBC Sport	N/A	N/A	N/A	N/A	87%	N/A
The Cincinnati Enquirer	N/A	4.5/5	4.5/5	N/A	4.5/5	4.5/5

The GameCube, PlayStation 2 and Xbox versions received "universal acclaim", while the PC, PlayStation and Game Boy Advance versions received "generally favorable reviews", according to the review aggregation website Metacritic. In Japan, where the PS2 version was ported for release on December 19, 2002, Famitsu gave it a score of 33 out of 40.

Maxim gave it a perfect score twice, once from Ryan Boyce, who said that "The folks at EA Sports... loaded this year's ultrarealistic game up with a slew of new features that include online play, a huge arcade-style training camp, and a nifty play creator that's so versatile that you can have receivers run pass routes that spell your name"; and once from Scott Steinberg, who said that, "Destined for the Hall of Fame, Madden's latest namesake (now in its 13th year) improves upon already stunning graphics and amps game play with faster speed and such fresh gridiron moves as sidearm passing and—wahoo!—gang tackling." The Cincinnati Enquirer gave it four-and-a-half stars out of five, saying, "Veteran players will be familiar with the feel of the game they grew up with, but there are certainly enough tweaks and new additions to justify its purchase." BBC Sport gave the PS2 version 87%, saying, "While 'NFL 2K3' still has slightly better graphics, Madden's updated controls, the excellent franchise features and its heavenly tactical play make it one of the best sports games ever to grace the PS2."

Madden NFL 2003 was a runner-up for GameSpot's August 2002 "PC Game of the Month" award. It won the publication's annual "Best Sports Game on PC" award, and was nominated in the "Most Improved Sequel on PC", "Best Traditional Sports Game on GameCube", "Best Traditional Sports Game on Xbox" and "Best Online Game on PlayStation 2" categories. During the 6th Annual Interactive Achievement Awards, the game won both "Console Sports Game of the Year" and "Computer Sports Game of the Year".

== Legacy ==
Madden NFL 2003 was included in The EA Sports Collection in May 2004 along with other 2002 EA Sports games.
