= Terry McGovern (actor) =

American actor (born 1942)

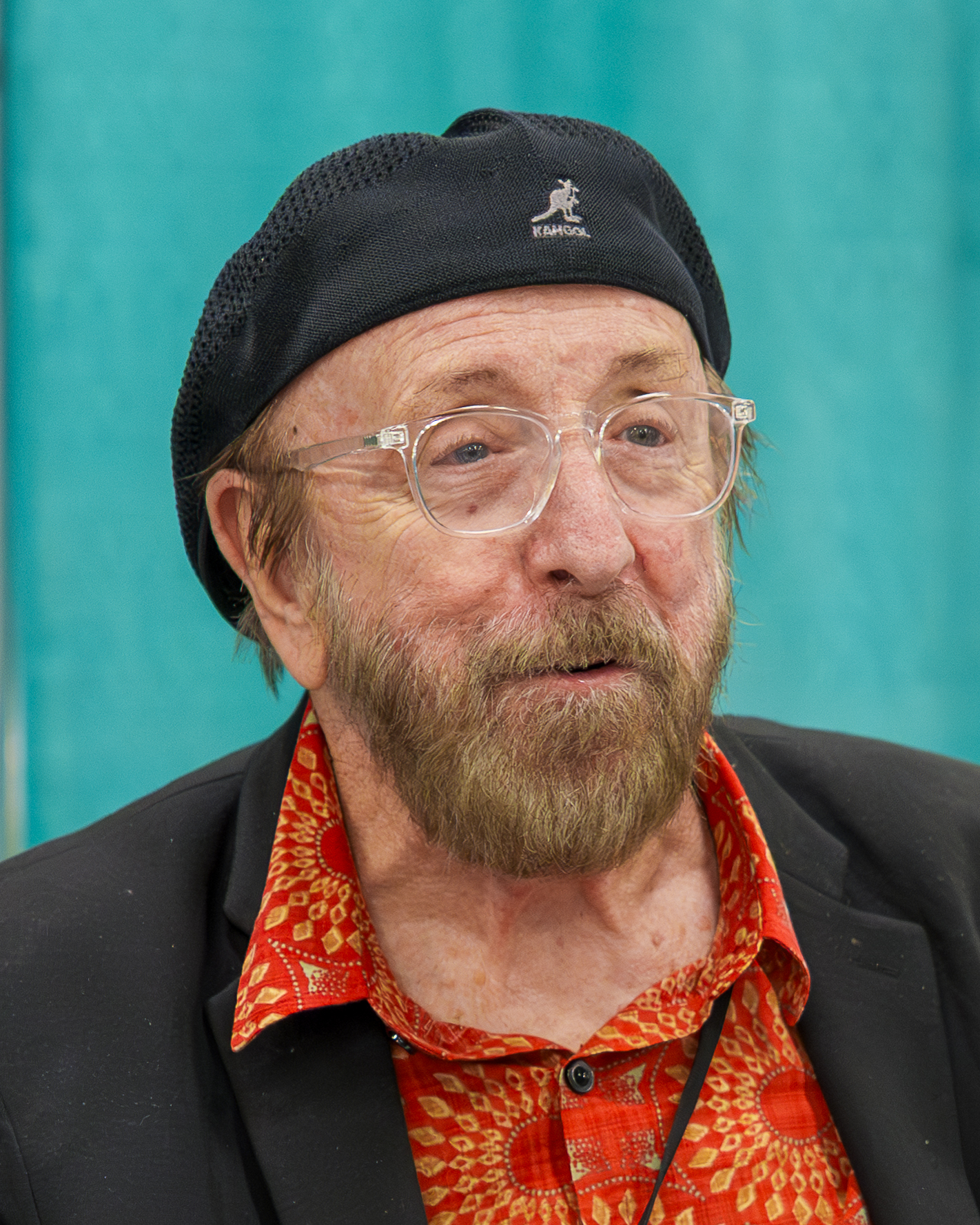
- McGovern at Animate! Columbia in 2026
- Born: Terence McGovern; May 11, 1942 (age 84); Berkeley, California, U.S.
- Occupations: Actor; television broadcaster; radio personality; acting instructor
- Years active: 1965–present
- Spouse: Molly McGovern (m. 1967)
- Children: 2
- Website: terrymcgovern.com

Terence McGovern (born May 11, 1942) is an American actor, television broadcaster, radio personality and acting instructor. He is best known as the original voice of Disney character Launchpad McQuack from DuckTales and spin-off Darkwing Duck. He was also elected into the Bay Area Radio Hall of Fame as a member of its Class of 2008.

== Career ==
McGovern was schooled at Duquesne University in Pittsburgh with a double major in journalism and English, and later studied acting with Stella Adler and Milton Katselas. McGovern worked at KDKA radio and KDKA-TV in Pittsburgh from 1965 to 1969, leaving for KSFO in San Francisco during the summer of 1969. At age 30, McGovern traveled to Los Angeles, California, to further pursue his entry into acting. He started his career in films with George Lucas, in Lucas' inaugural film, THX 1138. It was on this film that Terry created the word Wookiee. According to Lucas in a 1977 Rolling Stone interview, he stated: " We were riding along in the car one day and he (Terry) said: 'I think I ran over a Wookiee back there,' and this really cracked me up and I said, 'What is a Wookiee?' and he said, 'I don't know, I just made it up.'"

Lucas and McGovern continued their work together in the 1970s classics American Graffiti and Star Wars. McGovern played the role of the young high school teacher Mr. Bill Wolfe in American Graffiti, and in Star Wars he provided voice-overs for various personalities of the Empire. In 1993, he appeared in Mrs. Doubtfire, playing a voiceover director who argues with Daniel Hillard during the opening scene. McGovern also appeared in Back to the Future in a deleted scene as the McFlys' neighbor, who pressures George into buying an entire case of peanut brittle to help fund his daughter's Little League team.

McGovern played Jim Coyle in the CBS series Charlie & Co. and has helped to create hundreds of television and radio commercials. McGovern starred in Walt Disney's animated series DuckTales and Darkwing Duck as the characters Launchpad McQuack and Babyface Beagle (only as Launchpad in Darkwing Duck). On theatrical stages, McGovern has had roles ranging from musical comedies to Shakespeare.

Since 1999, McGovern has voiced "Dan Stevens", fictional play-by-play announcer, for the NFL 2K series of sports video games, alongside voice actor Jay Styne (as "Peter O' Keefe"). Both have provided their voices for all seven games in the series, the last being the unlicensed All-Pro Football 2K8. Critics have praised McGovern and Styne's commentary as a great alternative to sports video games featuring real commentary teams.

McGovern is an instructor of commercial and character voice and scene and monologue acting, and he contributes to the College of Marin with his expertise. He taught script writing and the history of broadcast announcing for the University of San Francisco. He is also the artistic director of The Marin Actors' Workshop, which he founded. He published a poetry booklet entitled Rod McCroon's Look at the Loud, which is a parody of Listen to the Warm by Rod McKuen. The poetry was presented to his KSFO audience.

Since 2012, he has hosted the weekend morning show on Boss Boss Radio. The internet radio station plays the Top 40 hits of the Boss Radio era, 1964 thru 1980.

== Personal life ==
McGovern and his wife Molly have two sons, and they live in Marin County, California.

== Selected filmography ==
=== Film ===
- THX 1138 (1971) as Announcer (voice)
- The Candidate (1972) as Reporter (KSFO)
- American Graffiti (1973) as Mr. Wolfe
- Magnum Force (1973) as Demonstrator (uncredited)
- Smile (1975) as Judge #2
- Northville Cemetery Massacre (1976) as Teddy
- The Enforcer (1976) as Disc Jockey
- Star Wars (1977) as Stormtroopers (voice)
- Americathon (1979) as Danny Olson
- J-Men Forever (1979) (voice)
- Cardiac Arrest (1980) as Brewer
- The Incredible Shrinking Woman (1981) as Cheese Demonstrator
- Girls Just Want to Have Fun (1985) as Ira
- Radioactive Dreams (1985) as Nicky Nuker
- Innerspace (1987) as Travel Agent
- Amazon Women on the Moon (1987) as Salesman (segment "First Lady of the Evening")
- Party Line (1988) as Simmons
- DuckTales the Movie: Treasure of the Lost Lamp (1990) as Launchpad McQuack (voice)
- Mrs. Doubtfire (1993) as A.D.R. Director Lou
- Nine Months (1995) as Dr. Newsoe
- Jack (1996) as Radio Personality
- The Californians (2005) as Mr. Putterman

=== Television ===
- Happy Days (1974) as Sloan Marlowe
- Fernwood 2 Night (1977) as Larry Guy, Terry Guy
- Three's Company (1977) as Ray Hagen
- Mork & Mindy (1978) as Club manager
- St. Elsewhere (1982) as Reporter
- Dempsey (1983, TV Movie) as Benson
- The A-Team (1983) as Prof. Bruce Warfel (Episode: "The Rabbit Who Ate Las Vegas"; credited as Terence McGovern)
- Mickey Spillane's Mike Hammer (1984) as Taylor Wilson
- The Jetsons (1985–1987) (voice)
- Charlie & Co. (1985, TV Series) as Jim Coyle
- Kissyfur (1985, TV Series) as Jolene
- Transformers (1985–1986, TV Series) as Wildrider (voice)
- Greatest Adventure: Stories from the Bible (1986–1989, TV Series) as Derek
- Foofur (1987, TV Series) (voice)
- DuckTales (1987–1990, TV Series) as Launchpad McQuack / Baby Face Beagle (voice)
- The Hogan Family (1988) as Buddy Natkin
- The Magical World of Disney (1989–1990, TV Series) as Launchpad McQuack (voice)
- Darkwing Duck (1991–1992, TV Series) as Launchpad McQuack (voice)
- Raw Toonage (1992, TV Series) Launchpad McQuack (voice)
- MythBusters (2011) as himself (Episode: "Mission Impossible Mask")

=== Video games ===
Year	Title	Role	Notes
1990	DuckTales: The Quest for Gold	Launchpad McQuack	
1997	Lego Island	Bill Ding, Studs Linkin, Radio Guy	
1997	Curse of Monkey Island, The	Capt. Blondebeard, Gruff	
1998	Star Wars Trilogy Arcade	Admiral Ackbar, Controller, Rebel B	
1998	Star Wars: Rogue Squadron	Crix Madine, Wes Janson	
1999	Star Wars: X-Wing Alliance	Admiral Ackbar, Rebel Pilot 2	
1999	Star Wars Episode I: Racer	Bozzie Baranta, Ratts Tyerell	
1999	Rising Zan: The Samurai Gunman	Narrator, Gunman	
2000	Star Wars Math: Jabba's Game Galaxy	Ratts Tyerell	
2000	X-Squad	Soldiers	
2000	Star Wars: Jar Jar's Journey Adventure Book	Graga, Clam	
2002	Ty the Tasmanian Tiger	Lenny the Lyre Bird	
2002	Liberty's Kids	Benjamin Franklin	
2004	ESPN NFL 2K5	Dan Stevens	
2004	Ty the Tasmanian Tiger 2	Lenny, Trader Bob	
2005	Ty the Tasmanian Tiger 3: Night of the Quinkan	Lenny the Lyre Bird	
2006	The Godfather	Al Neri	
2007	Sam & Max Beyond Time and Space	Santa Claus, the Spirits of Christmas	
2010	Sam & Max: The Devil's Playhouse	Elf Snowcone, Nicholas Saint Kringle	
2011	Law & Order: Legacies	Giles Bedford	
2012	The Walking Dead	Larry, Save-Lots Bandits, Gary	
2013	DuckTales: Remastered	Launchpad McQuack	
2013	The Wolf Among Us	Johann the Butcher	
2017	2064: Read Only Memories	Keith	

- Star Wars: Jedi Knight: Mysteries of the Sith (1998) as Rebel Commander / Pirate Raider / Rebel Soldier 2 / Stormtrooper / Civilian Man / Trandoshan / Abron Mar (voice)
- Star Wars: Droid Works (1998) (voice)
- Sim Theme Park (1999) as Advisor (voice)
- D no Shokutaku 2 (1999) (voice)
- Mechwarrior 3 (1999) as Dominic Paine (voice)
- NFL 2K (1999) as Dan Stevens (voice)
- Clock Tower II: The Struggle Within (1999) as Allen Hale, George Maxwell (voice)
- X Fire (2000) (voice)
- Star Wars: Force Commander (2000) as Stormtrooper #1 (voice)
- Ms. Pac-Man Maze Madness (2000) as Professor Pac (voice)
- NFL 2K1 (2000) as Dan Stevens (voice)
- Star Wars: Episode I: Battle for Naboo (2000) as Kol Kotha, Trader 1 (voice)
- Shadow of Memories (2001) as Pedestrian 1, Pedestrian 6 (voice)
- Star Wars: Galactic Battlegrounds (2001) as Jedi Knight / Stormtrooper (voice)
- Reader Rabbit: Capers on Cloud Nine (2001) as Sam the Lion (voice)
- NFL 2K2 (2001) as Dan Stevens (voice)
- SOCOM U.S. Navy SEALs (2002) (voice)
- Shinobi (2002) (voice)
- Pac-Man World 2 (2002) as Professor Pac (voice)
- NFL 2K3 (2002) as Dan Stevens (voice)
- Jet Set Radio Future (2002) (voice)
- The Sims: Superstar (2003) as Sim (voice)
- ESPN NFL Football (2003) as Dan Stevens (voice)
- Airforce Delta: Blue Wing Knights (2004) (voice)
- Batman Begins (2005) (voice)
- All-Pro Football 2K8 (2007) as Dan Stevens (voice)
- Family Feud 2010 Edition (2009) as Announcer (voice)
- Press Your Luck 2010 Edition (2009) as Announcer (voice)
- Axis Football 17 (2017) as Dave Stevens (voice)
- Axis Football 2018 (2018) as Dave Stevens (voice)

=== Broadcast history ===
- KDKA Radio and Television, Pittsburgh, 1965–69
- KSFO Radio, San Francisco, 1969–74
- KPIX Television, San Francisco, 1975–77
- KSAN Radio, San Francisco, 1974–79
- KWST Radio, Los Angeles, 1980
- KRLA Radio, Los Angeles, 1982–83
- POWER 104 Radio, New York, 1983
- K-101 Radio, San Francisco, 1988–92
- KYA Radio, San Francisco, 1992–94
- KTVU Television, San Francisco, 1992–94
- KRON-TV and BayTV, San Francisco, 1994–97
- "Profiles in Rock," syndicated radio series from Watermark, Inc., 1980
