= VMU =

Memory card for the Dreamcast

Visual Memory Unit
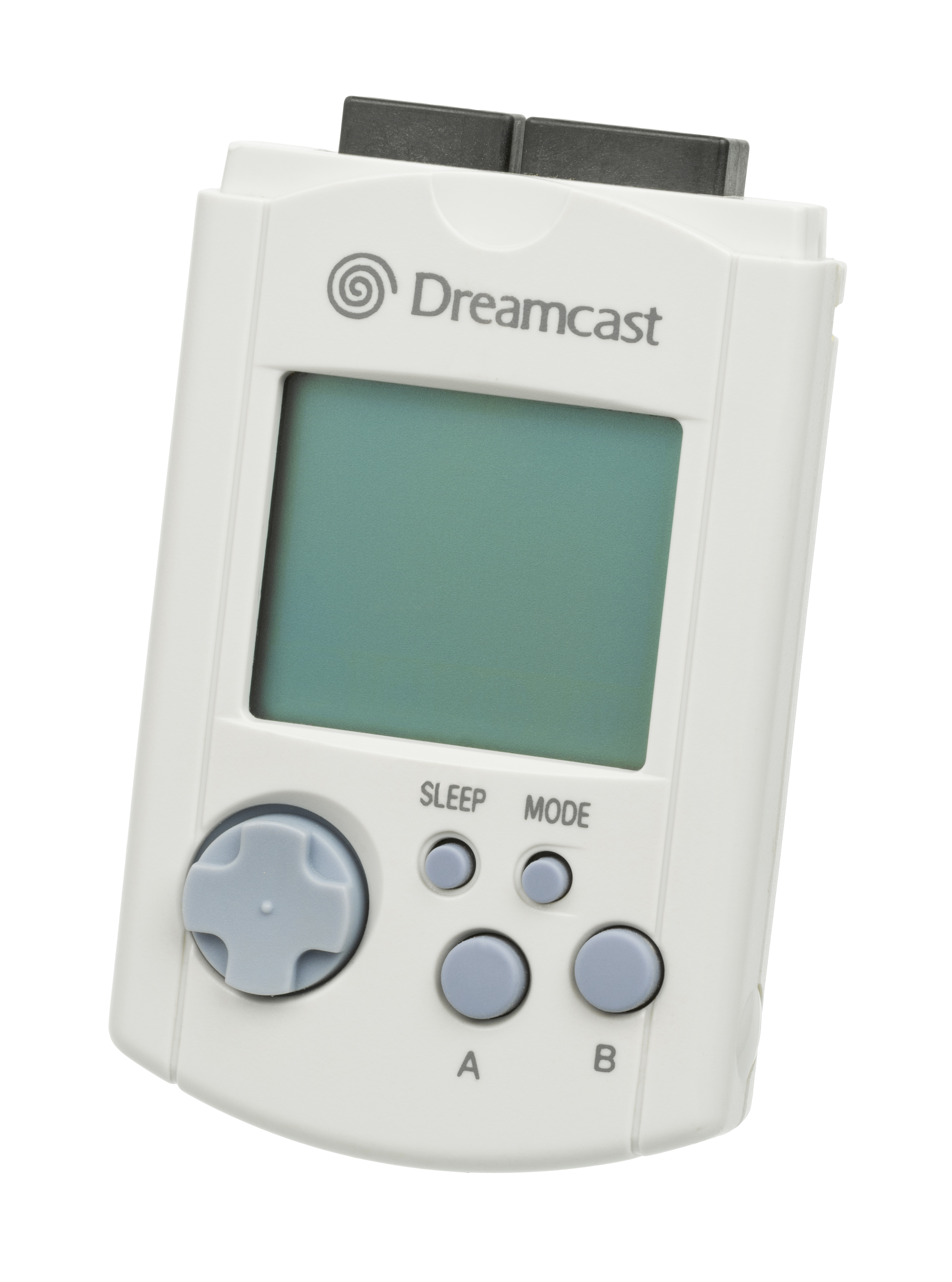
- Manufacturer: Sega
- Type: Peripheral, handheld game system
- Generation: Sixth
- Released: JP: July 30, 1998; NA: September 9, 1999; EU: October 14, 1999; AU: November 30, 1999
- Lifespan: 1998–2001
- Discontinued: JP: March 30, 2001
- Media: Dreamcast GD-ROM (used for content transfer)
- CPU: 8-bit Sanyo LC8670
- Storage: 100 KB (200 blocks) accessible 28 KB (56 blocks) system data
- Input: 4 x digital buttons; Digital D-Pad
- Power: 2 × CR2032 lithium batteries
- Weight: 45g

The Visual Memory Unit (VMU), also referred to as the Visual Memory System (ビジュアルメモリ, Bijuaru Memori) (VMS) in Japan, is the primary memory card produced by Sega for the Dreamcast home video game console. The device features a monochrome liquid crystal display (LCD), multiplayer gaming capability (via connectors at the top), second screen functionality, a real-time clock, file manager, built-in flash memory, and sound capability. Prior to the launch of the Dreamcast, a special Godzilla edition VMU, preloaded with a virtual pet game, was released on July 30, 1998, in Japan.

While its most basic function is as a removable storage device, the VMU may also serve as an auxiliary display during normal gameplay and, through the use of additional software (distributed as extras on Dreamcast GD-ROMs), acts as a handheld game console. The VMU was mostly purchased separately from the console. Console-like features of the VMU include a screen, speaker, proper directional pad, four action buttons, the ability to connect and interact with other VMUs, and the ability to download additional games.

== Hardware ==
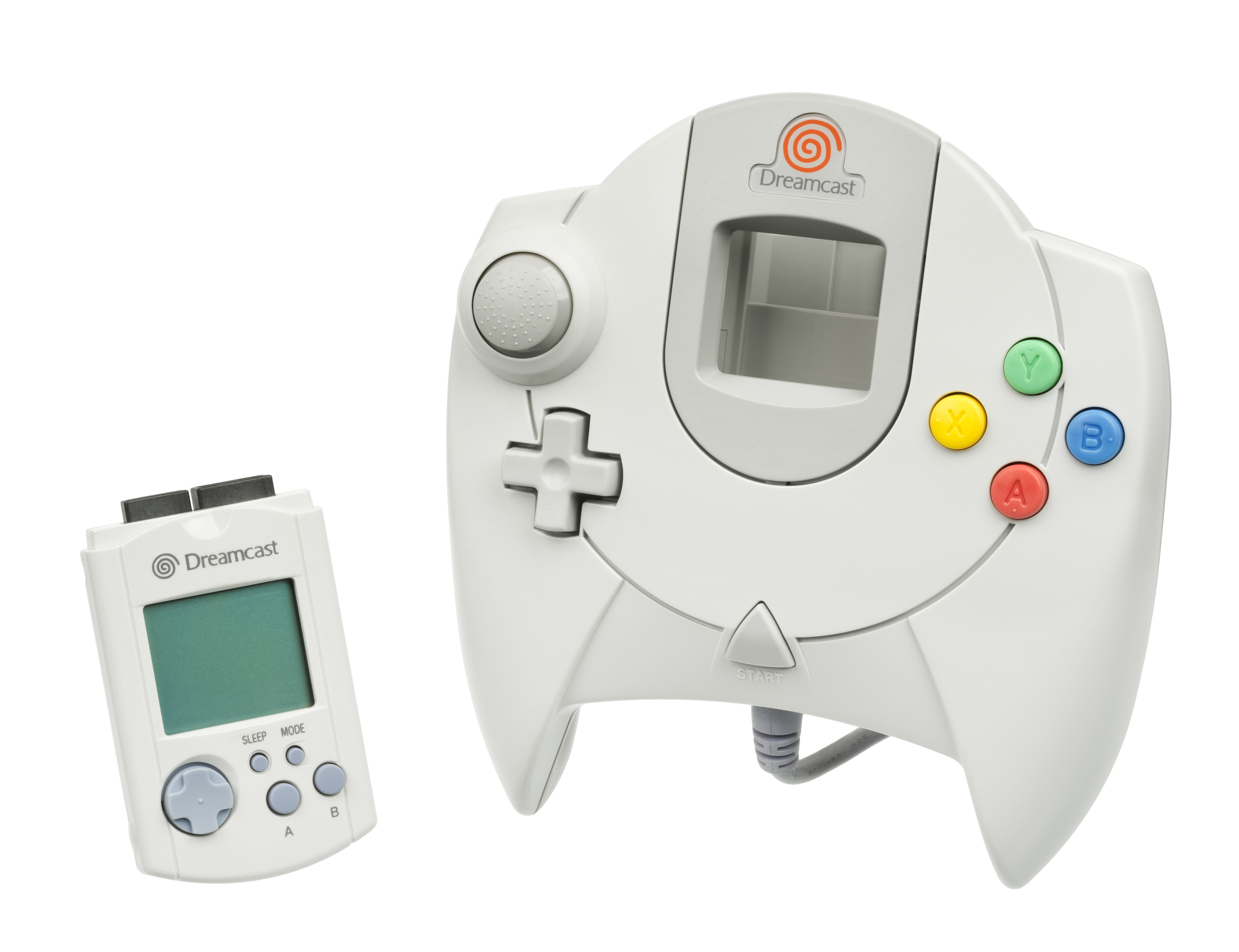
VMUs attach through either of two slots on the controller; the screen of the VMU attached in the front slot is visible through a window on the controller.

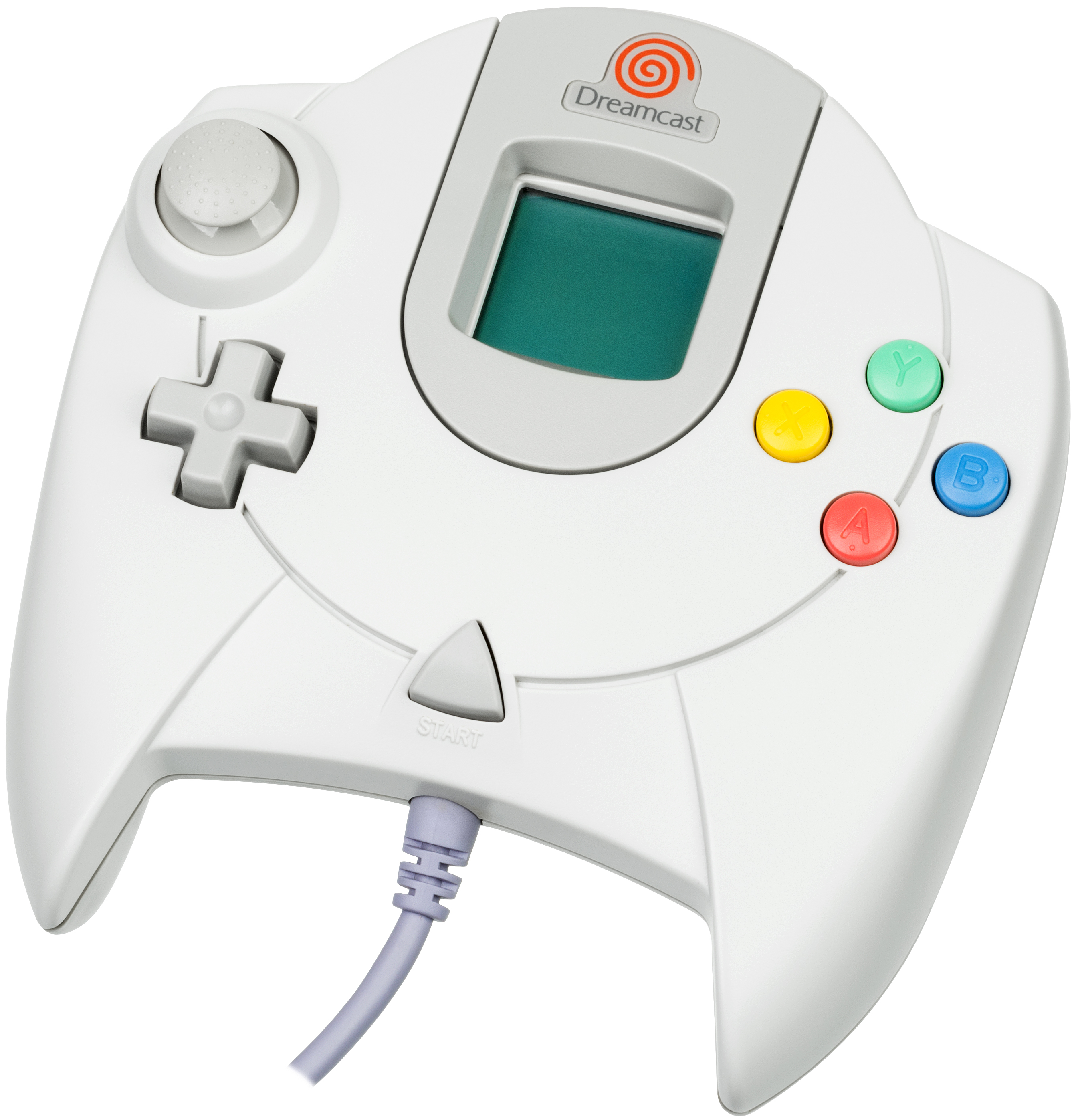
The VMU shown inside the controller

For use as a memory card and second screen, the VMU is plugged directly into one of two slots on a Dreamcast controller (up to two VMUs may be plugged in each controller, and eight VMUs per Dreamcast console).

Upon initial use, the player is prompted to set the date and time, and then select from a group of bitmap images to serve as the default background for the VMU (various Dreamcast titles may offer players additional background images for the unit). This image is displayed while the Dreamcast console is in the operating system menu.

When operated independently of the Dreamcast console, the VMU acts as a file manager, clock/calendar (with selectable clock animations), and handheld game console. VMUs may also connect to each other directly to facilitate file transfer or multiplayer gaming.

The VMU runs on two CR-2032 lithium batteries which are inserted into the rear of the VMU under a screw-secured lid. Without battery power, the VMU still functions as a memory card and auxiliary display, but cannot play downloaded mini-games. Additionally, a VMU without battery power will beep when the Dreamcast is powered on (if the VMU is inserted into a connected Dreamcast controller)

The VMU has 128 KB of flash memory, but by default 28 KB is reserved for system use leaving 100 KB for data storage, which is divided into 200 'blocks' – one block equaling 512 bytes. In recent years, homebrew programs like Dream Explorer (aka VMU Tool) have allowed users to unlock an extra 44 blocks (22 KB) of this reserved space increasing the overall VMU capacity to 244 blocks. However, a handful of games might be unable to detect the memory card if this is done, although none have been reported apart from DreamKey/DreamPassport and Metropolis Street Racer.

== Minigames and in-game features ==
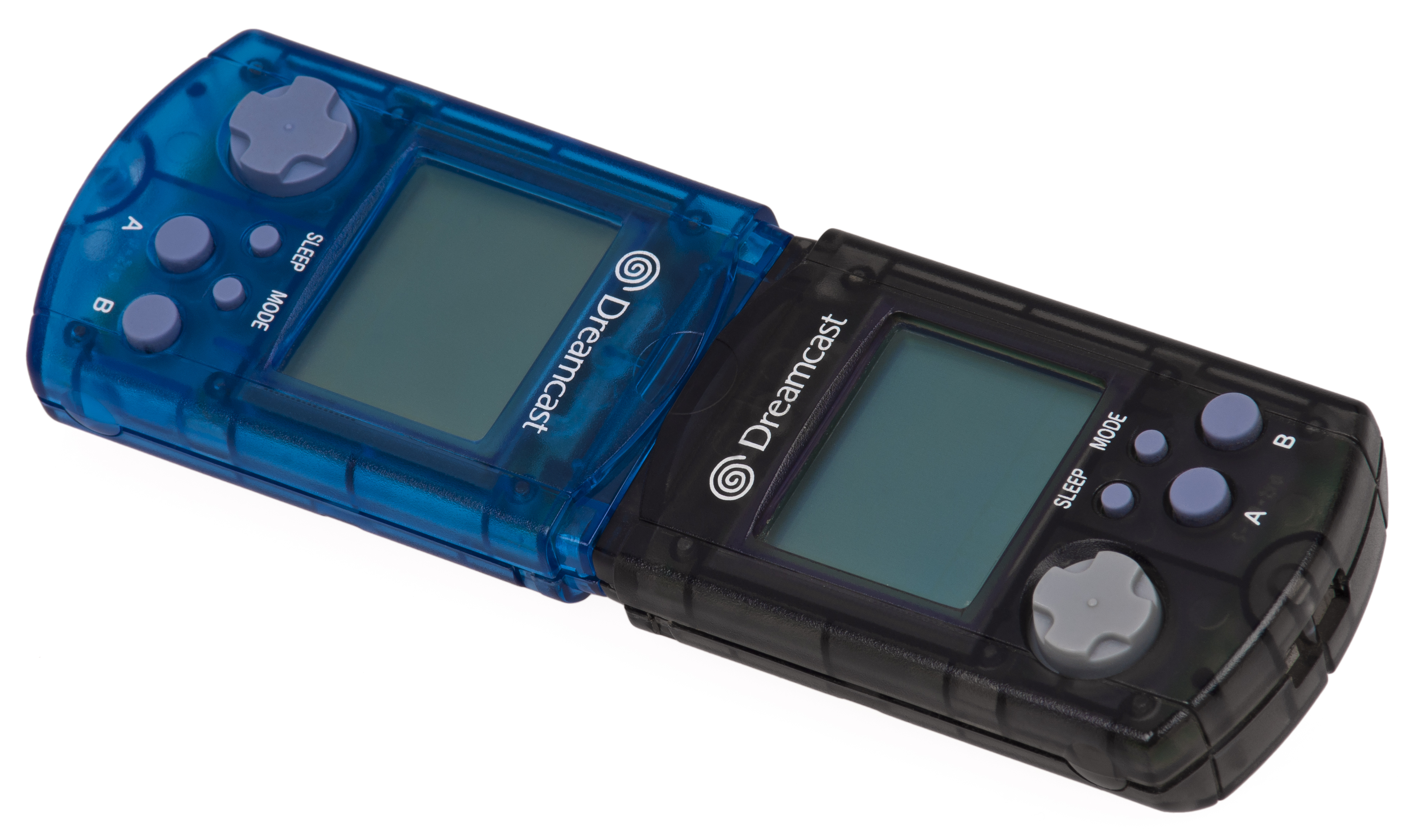
VMUs can be coupled to trade files or for multi-player gaming.

Several titles for the Dreamcast include mini-games that can be downloaded onto a VMU. The Sonic Adventure series, for instance, include the Chao Adventure mini-games (Chao Adventure and Chao Adventure 2 which features more activities and items). In the games, players can transfer Chao eggs to the VMU and partake in various activities to increase the stats of their hatched Chao, whereupon they can upload their improved Chao back into the Dreamcast game. Sega GT includes Pocket GT, a top-down racer in the style of the 8-bit SpyHunter games.

In other video games, statistics such as the current health condition are displayed on the VMU for convenience (as in Resident Evil: Code Veronica) or to enhance multi-player gaming (for example, NFL 2K2 allowed the VMU to display secret plays not viewable to other players).

There are also numerous homebrew games, original creations and ports of famous games that are freely available on the internet and can be installed and played on a VMU. These games include: Metroid, VMU Mini Pacman, Breakout, Space Invaders, Tetris, VMU Fighter (a side-scrolling shoot 'em up), VMU Football (an American football game), VMU-a-Sketch (a digital Etch-a-sketch pad), and 3D FPS (a first-person-shooter).

Dreamcast game	VMU minigame	In-game features
Cardcaptor Sakura: Tomoyo no Video Daisakusen	Three mini-games: Breakout; Oyatu; Tobakero; Clock (four themes)	?
Carrier	—N/a	Health condition
D2	Photo viewer	Compass
Dino Crisis	—N/a	Health condition; Ammo count
Evil Twin: Cyprien's Chronicles	Four mini-games (downloadable)	?
Evolution: The World of Sacred Device	?	Health condition
Evolution 2: Far Off Promise	12-hour clock	—N/a
F355 Challenge	—N/a	Arcade connectivity
Godzilla Generations (Japanese version)	Three mini-games: Atsumete Godzilla; Gamera Dream Battle; Mothra Dream Battle	?
Jet Set Radio / Jet Grind Radio	Graffiti transfer	—N/a
Marvel vs. Capcom 2: New Age of Heroes	Transfer characters, colors and stages	Arcade connectivity
Namco Museum	Pac-It	—N/a
NBA 2K / 2K1 / 2K2	—N/a	Team statistics
NFL 2K / 2K1 / 2K2 / Blitz	?	Secret plays
Pen Pen TriIcelon	—N/a	Currently selected playable character
Pop'n Music series	Pop'n Music Anywhere mini-game	Virtual Pop'n Music controller
Power Stone	Three mini-games: Gunrock’s Gun-Gun Slot; Falcon’s Aerial Adventure; Ayame’s Shuriken Training	?
Power Stone 2	View and trade items	?
Quake III Arena	Maze mini-game	Animation
Ready 2 Rumble	?	Punch count; Hit percentage
Resident Evil series	?	Health condition
Sakura Wars 3	?	Kinematron messages; Area map
Seaman	Organize and raise food for Seaman	Seaman microphone status
Sega GT	Pocket GT (Japan, Europe and US)	—N/a
Sega Rally 2	Stats and records	—N/a
Shenmue	Shenmue Goodies	Training instructions
Silent Scope	?	Sniper rifle scope view
Skies of Arcadia	Pinta's Quest	Cham alert
Sonic Adventure	Chao Adventure	Chao animation
Sonic Adventure 2	Chao Adventure 2	—N/a
Sonic Shuffle	—N/a	Revealed card numbers
Soulcalibur (Japanese version)	Three mini-games	Animated characters
Super Magnetic Neo	—N/a	Secret area alerts
Tech Romancer	Three mini-games	?
Time Stalkers	Five mini-games	—N/a
Tokyo Bus Guide	Traffic Signs Quiz	?
TrickStyle	TrickStyle Jr.	?
Virtua Tennis	?	Wireframe match
Zombie Revenge	Three mini-games	?

== Variants ==
Multiple Dreamcast memory cards with no VMU features have been released. The cards therefore omit a display screen, input buttons, speaker and built-in clock. Some have the same 128 KB storage as the VMU, equivalent to 200 blocks, while others have multiple "pages" with each acting as a 128 KB memory card. In the latter case, a button or switch allows the user to select the desired memory card. This is due to the Dreamcast having a limit of 128 KB per individual memory card.

=== 4x Memory Card ===
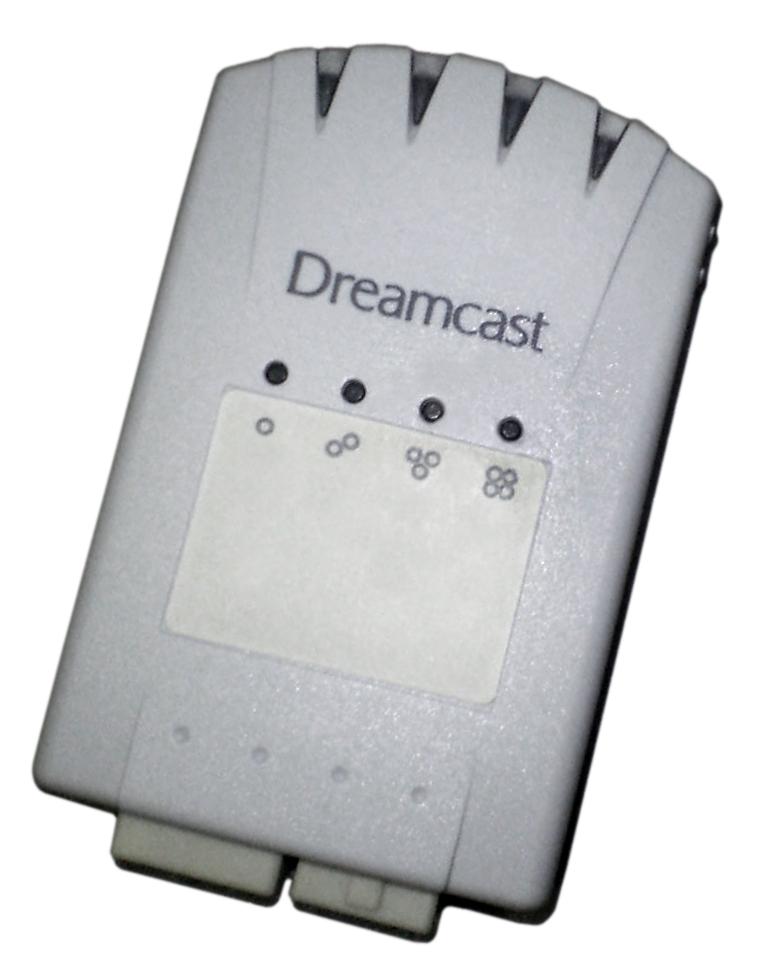
The official Dreamcast 4x memory card has several lights on its front indicating the currently used storage "page".

Sega released an official 4x Memory Card which offered four times the data storage of a standard VMU, with 800 blocks. It was released in Japan on December 14, 2000, as "Memory Card 4X", and in the US as "4x Memory Card". A button is used to select one of four "pages", and a series of four orange LED on the card indicates which of these is currently in use. Not all games are compatible, so Sega released a list of incompatible games.

A limited edition Phantasy Star Online 4x Memory Card was also released in Japan to coincide with the game's release. It was coloured blue and featured the Phantasy Star Online logo printed onto the casing.

The 4x Memory Card did not make it to retail in Europe, despite a planned release (along with the Dreamcast Broadband Adapter which was also unreleased in Europe) due to the Dreamcast's unforeseeably short lifespan – although unofficial third party 4x Memory Cards were released in Europe.

=== Third-party memory cards ===
The Nexus Memory Card is a third party version of the Visual Memory Unit that features four times the memory of a stock VMU with 800 blocks (4 megabit / 512 kilobytes) but lacks an LCD screen. The card is divided into 4 pages each with 200 blocks, each page can be selected using a button on the top left of the card. The Nexus Memory Card is slightly larger than the normal VMU and can be connected to a personal computer by USB, Parallel or Serial cable. A 3200 block (16 megabit / 2 megabytes) version of the Nexus is also available, but this model has been known to be unstable.

Nyko released two memory cards for the Dreamcast: the Jumbo Memory Pak X2 with twice the storage as a VMU, and the Hyperpak with four times the storage. The Hyperpak could also act as a Jump Pak by setting its switch to rumble mode.

The Performance Memory Card was a third-party basic memory card with the same 200 blocks of storage as a VMU. The Performance Mega Memory Card acted like a 4X Memory Card. It used a switch on its back to select the desired memory card "page". Unlike other memory cards however, the Performance model had to be removed from the controller before the "page" could be switched.

In September 2023, following a successful crowdfunding campaign, Dreamware Enterprises released an aftermarket VMU update called the VM2. The VM2 features a backlit screen, a rechargeable battery with USB-C support, and MicroSD storage.

== Reception ==
In a 10-year retrospective, GamesRadar called the VMU "one of our favorite storage devices". They offered praise for the originality of the device, as well its flexibility and commented that newer systems should have revisited the concept. However, they lamented that most games didn't find a useful purpose for it and that the device drained batteries quickly. In 2024, Time Extension called the VMU "an important evolution of the memory card concept".

== See also ==
- PocketStation, a similar device by Sony for the PlayStation, released six months later
