= ESPN football =

ESPN football may refer to:

- ESPN College Football
- List of programs broadcast by ESPN, includes National Football League programs
- ESPN NFL Football, American football video game released in 2003
- ESPN NFL 2K5, American football video game released in 2004 and 2005

== See also ==
- Soccer on ESPN/ABC, association football coverage
