= The Greatest Adventure =

The Greatest Adventure may refer to:

- The Greatest Adventure: Stories from the Bible, a Hanna-Barbera animated series released direct-to-video from 1985 to 1992
- "The Greatest Adventure" (song), a song from the 1977 Rankin/Bass film The Hobbit
- The Greatest Adventure (comic book), a 2017—2018 comic book limited series published by Dynamite Entertainment, featuring Edgar Rice Burroughs characters and concepts
- The Greatest Adventure (documentary), a 1978 NASA documentary on the Apollo program and Moon landing.
