= Dark Angel: Vampire Apocalypse =

2001 video game

- North American PlayStation 2 cover art
- Developer: Metropolis Digital
- Publisher: Metro3D
- Platform: PlayStation 2
- Release: NA: July 13, 2001
- Genre: Action-role-playing
- Mode: Single-player

Dark Angel: Vampire Apocalypse is an action role-playing game (ARPG) developed by Metropolis Digital and published by Metro3D for the PlayStation 2 (PS2) home game console.

== Plot ==
Set in the year 1670 in the land of Gothos, Dark Angel follows the female vampire protagonist Anna, who is assigned to protect three villages from the evil Shadow Lord and his armies of minions. Anna has but one year to gather the necessary experience and supplies for the inevitable showdown with the Shadow Lord. Featuring hack and slash-style gameplay inspired by titles such as Diablo, Dark Angel has the player take on missions, explore random dungeons, and battle hordes of monsters. The game allows the player to map a wide variety of weapons and items using the game controller face buttons.

== Development and release ==
Dark Angel: Vampire Apocalypse was originally announced in 1999 by Metro3D to be in development for the Dreamcast. The 21-person team, which also worked on Metro3D's Armada, was led by Mark Jordan, the company's vice president of development, and was composed of many ex-Atari and THQ staffers. IGN reported that Dark Angel was advertised for both the Dreamcast and PS2 in the October 2000 issue of NextGen. When the website contacted the developer, they were informed that the game would be released for the PS2. In a January 2001 interview between the website GameSpot and Jordan, the developer admitted its plans to release a PS2 version of Dark Angel in the late first quarter of 2001 and a Dreamcast version a few months later.

According to Jordan, the storyline of Dark Angel grew from the development team's "fascination with gothic fantasy... love of stylish characters, and... desire to make an epic game". Other aspects of the game's development were taken from previously successful games. Character animation sets were inspired by properties including Diablo, Strider, and Fallout. The game was meant to be structured like the latter of the three titles, allowing the player to visit a multitude of locations and save anywhere. A new graphical engine was built from the ground up with "inverse kinematic components and special effects similar to the sword-slash streaks in Soul Calibur". In an earlier Dreamcast version interview, Jordan cited Zelda 64 for the game's use of viewpoint changes, depending on the situation.

Metro3D intended the Dreamcast version of Dark Angel: Vampire Apocalypse to utilize the console's VMU peripheral to build up the protagonist's skills and abilities or trade items with other players. Though similar to its Dreamcast counterpart, the PS2 edition was to feature graphical enhancements, making "extensive use of the PS2 alpha processor... with some scene lighting with four-point light sources". As Jordan explained to GameSpot, "We also do a lot of real-time simulation to generate real-time amorphous fog, exploding/bouncing character parts, and particle effects. Plus, we can throw more monsters at you on the PlayStation 2." Jordan further emphasized to IGN the PS2's graphical ability for real-point light sources, rendering semi-transparent particles, and displaying large numbers of polygons. "It's great for forcing us to learn assembly language really well. That is also the most difficult aspect," Jordan summarized. "To struggle and get good results is what makes developing for the PS2 worthwhile." A random mathematical system is employed to determine levels, weapons, and enemies. For example, some enemies may be more agile than others or have special abilities and resistances.

The game's release was delayed to early 2000, late 2000, and eventually early 2001. A Japanese release was planned. On March 20, 2001, Metro3D officially announced its decision to cancel the Dreamcast version due to waning support of the console and high development costs for third-party companies. Dark Angel: Vampire Apocalypse was officially released for the PS2 in North America on July 8, 2001. Metro3D had told GameSpot its plans to release a first-person shooter set in the Dark Angel universe for the PS2. Although games including "Dark Angel II" and "Dark Angel: Anna's Quest" were listed in development on the company's website, no other titles bearing the Dark Angel moniker were ever released.

Dark Angel: Vampire Apocalypse was also released for the Korean market, published by Digital Plans in 2002. It is not a US-exclusive.

== Reception ==
Reception

Aggregate score
Aggregator	Score
Metacritic	53/100

Review scores
Publication	Score
EP Daily	4 of 10
GameSpot	3.9 of 10
GameSpy	25%
IGN	5.2 of 10
Next Generation	2/5
Official U.S. PlayStation Magazine	1.5/5

Dark Angel: Vampire Apocalypse received "mixed" reviews according to the review aggregation website Metacritic. Chester "Chet" Barber of NextGen called it "an epic game with shallow gameplay." Atomic Dawg of GamePro said, "To call this flawed but fun game an RPG is to stretch the definition. Just the same Angel's crafty A.I. orchestrates a pretty mean horror show." (Note: GamePro gave the game two 3.5/5 scores for graphics and sound, and two 4/5 scores for control and fun factor.)
