= Star Command: Revolution =

1997 video game

- Developer: Metropolis Digital
- Publisher: GT Interactive
- Platforms: MS-DOS, Windows
- Release: NA: March 1997
- Genre: Real-time strategy
- Modes: Single player, multiplayer

Star Command: Revolution is a real-time strategy game developed by Metropolis Digital, Inc. and published by GT Interactive. It was originally released in 1997 for MS-DOS, and was re-released in 1998 for Microsoft Windows under the title Star Command Deluxe. This re-release was overshadowed by its contemporary, Starcraft. A sequel, Star Command X: Armada, is hinted at upon successful completion of the campaign mode, but it was never produced. Instead, the developer released the similarly named but unrelated game Armada on November 26, 1999.

The main storyline follows an interspecies conflict in the Zeta galaxy after the discovery of an energy resource called "Solinite." The races, previously coexisting in peace, begin fighting each other for control of the Solinite, until several political assassinations allow the tyrannical warlord Narvek to take over the galaxy. A small group of rebels who call themselves "Star Command" fight back against Narvek in an effort to dethrone him and restore peace to the galaxy.

== Gameplay ==
The nonlinear campaign mode places the player in control of a mothership commandeered by Star Command, with the objective of destroying Narvek. This mothership is the only ship that can collect resources and build other stations and ships. The campaign is lost if the player allows the mothership to be destroyed.

Each campaign battle occurs in one of 31 separate rectangular sectors, where the player must build enough ships to conquer the enemies' battalions while managing long-term resource consumption; resources are finite, and ships and stations (other than the mothership) cannot be brought between sectors. Most sectors have an objective, usually involving the destruction of enemy fleets or stations. Players who accomplish these tasks are rewarded with permanent bonuses, such as an increase in the mothership's harvesting rate. The battles increase in difficulty as the player nears Narvek's base.

Each battle begins with the sector completely obscured by fog of war. Areas the player explores become permanently visible, regardless of whether the player has any ships in that area.

=== Ships ===
Every ship and station has a set of four vital statistics: shield, tech, engine, and control. The "shield" statistic is how much damage the ship can stand before it is destroyed; once depleted, the ship explodes. "Tech" is what allows a ship to fire; reducing this tends to make a ship fire less often. "Engine" is a representation of how fast the ship can move; reducing this causes ships to move more sluggishly than normal. "Control" is a statistic, that, like "shield," has little effect until it is completely reduced; when this occurs, the ship defects to the side of the ship that dealt the last control damage (and restores some control). (Note: Stations, motherships, and the ships in campaign mode that can't be built by a player will self-destruct rather than defect.)

Each race has a set of 16 constructible ships and stations, some of which are similar across each race, such as a base, which is necessary for building ships, a university, which trains ships and teaches the mothership new technology necessary for building new ships, and a fighter carrier, which launches three smaller fighter ships at enemies within range. Each ship and station has a cost, which consists of various amounts of Solinite, time (not time to build, but time a player must wait before building again), and a resource specific to each race. Destroying a ship or station other than the mothership will leave behind an "Engine Core," which is a small amount of Solinite, and some of the race-specific resource.

Players start with the ability to build only 1 ship and 3 stations which are all similar for each race: the base, the university, a guardpost (a station that fires at enemies), and a "scout" class ship. The scout is the only type of ship which can break "pack" Solinite into smaller pieces that can be collected by the mothership.

Other than the mothership, ships have 7 "levels" of skill, which can be increased through combat, or up to level 4 by placing the ship next to a university. Higher levels give bonuses to the ships, such as a higher rate of fire or multiple shots at a time.

Placing the mothership next to a race's university allows it to learn that race's technology, i.e. more ships and stations. Once all of a race's technologies have been discovered, the mothership will next learn how to build another race's base. Building this will allow the player to build that race's university, allowing the player to learn even more technology.

=== Multiplayer modes ===
The game features a multiplayer battle mode, which is a single skirmish between two and four human or AI players. The game includes support for playing over a LAN or the Internet (an IPX-compatible card is necessary, however).

Additionally, the game includes support for a two-player campaign. However, it is not possible to load a saved two-player campaign.

== Races ==
Each race has 1 base, 7 ships (including 1 scout-class ship, 1 repair vessel, and 1 fighter carrier), 1 university, 1 guardpost, 1 small special station, 1 droid factory (necessary for building droids), 2 droids, 1 large special station, and 1 special action for the large station. There are no limits to the number of ships a player can produce, except a player cannot have more than 1 of any race's base, droid factory, or large special station.

=== Terrans ===
In the campaign mode, the player starts out with only Terran technology.

The Terrans are a humanoid race that specializes in control damage. (Note: This doesn't mean that they can only do this form of damage. All races do shield damage, but some of this race's special ships also do damage to another ship statistic.) Their repair vessel fixes other ships' tech damage. They can build a special ship called a "Switcher" which can instantaneously swap position with any friendly ship other than fighter carriers. The Terrans' special stations are the "Target," a small station that can be fired upon by friendly forces to increase their level, and the "StatCon," a large station which can fire the "Controller" to any visible point in the sector, dealing heavy control damage to any enemies it hits.

=== Computrons ===
The Computrons are the artificial intelligence race, specializing in tech damage. Their repair vessel heals shield damage on other friendly ships. One of their specialized ships is the "Reflex Weapon," a ship which can fire simultaneously on all enemies within range. Their special stations are the "Teleportal," which allows friendly ships other than carriers to immediately appear next to it, and the "Foldspacer," which by itself can fire a heavy shield blast at enemies and can "Fold Space," moving itself to any visible part of the sector. Additionally, the Computrons can build a droid called a "Scrambler," which cannot be targeted by stations.

=== Nomads ===
The Nomads are a humanoid race that specializes in heavy shield damage. Their repair vessel heals engine damage on other friendly ships. One special Nomad ship is the "Point Laser," a ship which can nullify a shot fired by another ship or cause a fighter to return to its carrier. Their special stations are the "Bomb," which the player can direct to explode, dealing heavy shield damage to every ship adjacent to it, and the "Torpedo Launcher," which launches a "Torpedo" at any visible point in the sector, dealing heavy shield damage to the ship(s) it hits. The Nomads can also build a "Bomb Droid" which does not self-destruct as the Bomb does, but explodes when destroyed, dealing some shield damage to any adjacent ships.

=== Triumverites ===
The Triumverites are beings with three disembodied brains floating in a canister where a head would be on a human. Many of their ships deal engine damage to enemies. One special Triumverite ship is the "Cloaker," which cannot be seen by enemies on the mini-map. Their special stations are the "Omni Fighter," a station that launches a Point Laser-immune fighter at enemy forces, and the "Repair Matrix," which fires a blast of energy to any visible point on the map that repairs every statistic of the ships it hits, and can also increase the ships' statistic capacity by a small amount. In contrast to the Computrons' Scrambler, the Triumverites can build a droid called an "Evaser," which cannot be targeted by ships.

== Reception ==
Reception

Review scores
Publication	Score
GameSpot	6.5/10 (DOS)
Next Generation	2/5 (DOS)

Star Command: Revolution received mixed reviews, with widespread praise for the ability to visit areas in non-linear order, but widespread criticism for the save system, specifically the allotment of only one save slot per campaign and that the game can only be saved between battles. Some critics also found that there is not enough gameplay differentiation between the four different species. In his review, GamePro's Major Mike said it "stands apart from the average Command & Conquer clone", citing the balance between exploration and battles, the detailed spacecraft, the voice digitization, and the easily mastered controls. Tim Chown likewise commented that Star Command: Revolution stood out from other real-time strategy games by combining genuine depth and challenge with frantic battles that play out with vivid graphics. He complained of several issues with the interface and AI, but concluded it "has enough novelty in style and presentation to warrant a close look."

Both Chown and Tim Soete, who reviewed the game for GameSpot, noted the game's similarity in appearance to early screenshots of StarCraft, and anticipated direct competition between them. However, Soete was less certain of Star Command's quality, musing that, "While Star Command's gameplay is absorbing and addictive at times, in the end it's hard to tell whether you're playing an inventive real-time strategy game that beat its competition to the mark or just revisiting a weightless pastiche of recycled ideas." He particularly criticized that there is no need to bother with the system of four damage meters, since focusing on destroying ships' shields is enough to guarantee victory. He concluded the game still has enough novelty to appeal to fans of the genre. A reviewer for Next Generation similarly said the game "has some new elements, but for the most part it's same old same old."
