= Puzzle Master =

1999 video game

- Developer: Metropolis Digital
- Publisher: Metro3D
- Platform: Game Boy Color
- Release: 11 November 1999
- Genre: Puzzle
- Mode: Single-player

Puzzle Master is a 1999 video game developed by Metropolis Digital and published by Metro3D. It is a puzzle video game in which players must arrange falling blocks in a row to clear levels with fantasy elements. Upon release, the game received average reviews.

== Gameplay ==
Gameplay screenshot

Puzzle Master is a in which players must align groups of one to five falling blocks that represent various elements, including fire, water, wood and stone. Arranging three of the same element in row clear them from the play field, and increase a meter that, when filled, completes the level. Players collect power-ups in a queue that, when used, assist the completion of segments: knives take out a column of pieces, keys and bombs remove parts of a level, and hearts complete a group. Levels also include items that interact with falling pieces, such as items that provide players with power-ups, or remove pieces. There are several game modes, including Quest, Time Challenge and Training. In Quest mode, there are monsters and fantastical creatures in levels that cause tiles to fall or place unremovable pieces, which can only be defeated with knives or bombs.

== Reception ==
Reception

Review scores
Publication	Score
AllGame	3/5
IGN	8/10
Nintendo Power	6.7/10

Some critics remarked that the game's design was atypical for a , although others felt the game was derivative of games such as Tetris. Nintendo Power considered the game built on Tetris by introducing "refreshing elements" that gave the player "more to do on each level", and greater variation across levels. Craig Harris of IGN stated the game was a "decent title" that tried "something new in a familiar genre", but the fantasy elements felt "out of place". Brett Alan Weiss of Allgamer felt the game was a "curiosity" in the genre, stating its mechanics were "interesting", but it lacked the "focus and intensity" of Tetris. Stating that it was a "shame it's not better known", Retro Gamer stated Puzzle Master introduced an "array of different things" atypical to the puzzle genre, including item collection, traps and interactive elements.
