= Sub Rebellion =

2002 video game

- Developer: Racjin
- Publishers: JP: Irem; WW: Metro3D
- Platform: PlayStation 2
- Release: JP: May 2, 2002; NA: October 10, 2002; EU: October 25, 2002
- Genre: Submarine simulator
- Mode: Single-player

Sub Rebellion, known in Japan as U: Underwater Unit (-U- アンダーウォーター ユニット, -U- Andāwōtā Yunitto), is a submarine simulation video game developed by Racjin and published by Irem and Metro3D for PlayStation 2 in 2002.

== Plot ==
The game takes place in the year 2154, fifteen years after a cataclysmic event involving massive-scale movement of the Earth's crust, resulting in two thirds of the planet being very deeply submerged underwater, as well as the exposure of a mysterious ancient civilisation that had been concealed throughout the planet. In the present, the Meluguis Empire, a cruel, oppressive and militaristic regime formed out of the military-industrial complex, is striving for world domination, and it is opposed by the Allied Forces. In a desperate effort to reverse the highly unfavourable war situation they are in, the Allied Forces develop a highly advanced submarine called the Chronos, a vessel capable of great manoeuvrability and prowess in underwater combat. This new submarine is provided to a crew of mercenaries who have volunteered to fight in service to the Alliance.

The first mission the mercenaries operating the Chronos undertake involves fighting through Imperial forces in a large city area in order to eliminate two clusters of magnetic mines, followed by the destruction of a large minelayer submarine. The second mission involves fighting through an ancient ruin to reach and excavate a goddess statue buried under rock, and then surviving an enemy driller submarine ambush. The third mission involves fighting to reach and destroy multiple Imperial land batteries, followed by interception and destruction of an enemy destroyer. The fourth mission involves deployment to the Caribbean, fighting to destroy multiple unmanned enemy underwater batteries inside a massive fissure, followed by rescuing an allied submarine trapped under fallen rocks. After this rescue, the Chronos is immediately attacked by the Hammerhead, a very fast and technologically sophisticated submarine crewed by mysterious mercenaries serving the Empire. The Chronos crew seriously damage this enemy vessel and it retreats. The fifth mission involves fighting through a cave in close-quarters combat to eliminate Imperial submarines and excavate a strange artifact (called Medusa Head). The artifact is excavated before the air supply of the Chronos is depleted. The sixth mission is a deployment to a deep sea area in the Azores, involving hunting down and destroying four seriously dangerous large enemy submarines, followed by engaging and destroying a massive, heavily armed and heavily armoured submersible battleship. In the ruins of this battleship contains a fragment of an ancient board. The seventh mission is a deployment to the southern tip of Greenland, involving the neutralisation of three heavily defended Imperial command centres of land bases. After the destruction of the command centres, the Chronos is ambushed by four enemy driller submarines, which it destroys. The eighth mission involves scouring ancient ruins in order to acquire the other fragments of the ancient board, fighting and destroying Imperial forces along the way. The completed ancient chart goes into details about spatial/time warps and an escaped "Guardian", as well as spatial relations of the Bermuda area. The ninth mission is a deployment to the Bermuda area, involving surface assault on multiple enemy helicopters. After their elimination, the crew of the Chronos are ordered to investigate an intense energy reaction coming from underwater. When the Chronos approaches a strange statue, it is revealed to be the Guardian of Yore. The Guardian activates, traps the Chronos inside an energy barrier and attempts to destroy it, but is defeated by it. The Guardian is revealed to be part of the Ancient Civilisation (named 'Promethea'), being one of several such entities that had put in place to defend the civilisation's lands. The tenth mission involves making contact with four allied submarines that have acquired highly important intelligence on the enemy and are taking refuge in enemy territory. After the intelligence is gathered, an enemy destroyer arrives. After the destroyer is sunk by the Chronos, the Hammerhead arrives (equipped with deadlier weapons), discovering the Chronos's wavelength and communicating with the crew. The Chronos and Hammerhead fight again, with the Hammerhead again being seriously damaged and driven off. The defeats of the Hammerhead cause serious damage to its reputation, with it being transferred from front-line duties to exploring ruins. The intelligence gathered by the allied submarines revealed the Empire's plans to develop a flying boat that will be used to carry out a carpet bombing raid on Allied Headquarters. The eleventh mission is a deployment to Allied Headquarters located in the underwater New York ruins. The Chronos is sent to fight and destroy several Imperial reconnaissance submarines, followed by being tasked with defending the main base from a surprise attack made by a large and seriously dangerous Imperial assault force. An intelligence leak is suspected, with a spy being responsible. The twelfth mission involves pursuing the enemy spy (Lieutenant Commander Dempsey) through a cave network in order to discover the Imperial intelligence base, fighting enemies along the way. Once the base is discovered, Dempsey, the base and its defenders are eliminated. After this success, it is then revealed that the Allied Forces are no longer losing the war, and are now on an even par with the Empire.

The thirteenth mission involves deployment to the northern straits, involving destroying multiple Imperial heavy underwater batteries. After this, the Empire's large flying fortress seaplane, arrives. The Chronos attacks and destroys the heavily armed and dangerous aircraft before it can gain altitude, preventing the carpet bombing attack on Allied Headquarters. The Allied Forces achieve control over the northern region. The fourteenth mission is a deployment to an ancient ruin, involving protecting three allied submarines equipped with special sonar against attacking enemy forces. A second goddess statue is discovered, and when it is placed against the one discovered in the second mission, they both warn against use of the "Stillness". The fifteenth mission involves eliminating an enemy excavation team trying to acquire a Sphinx-like Promethean object. Once the team is eliminated, the object activates, and is revealed to be a highly powerful and dangerous Guardian capable of skating on water, and it tries to destroy the Chronos, but the Chronos crew manage to defeat it. With constant achievement of military victories, the war is now in the Allies' favour, with their power surpassing the Empire. The sixteenth mission is a deployment to the old city area, involving eradicating an enemy special weapons team prepping an extremely dangerous device, and wiping out two large enemy combat submarines. After this is done, the Chronos is sent to investigate an energy reaction. When the Chronos arrives, an ancient weapon is launched by the Empire. The Chronos pursues and disables it by destroying its propulsion system. There is speculation around the existence of a Promethean Holy Ground. In the seventeenth mission, there is a deployment to a labyrinth-like ancient ruin, involving fighting through Imperial forces to investigate an energy reaction very strongly suspected of having an ancient weapon (known as a Hidon) as its source. The Chronos reaches the weapon site, an aerial garden, before the Imperials do and excavates the weapon. The Hammerhead arrives (now with deadlier weapons) with backup and fights the Chronos, with the Hammerhead crew dismissing the war as meaningless. Again, the Chronos wins and the Hammerhead retreats. The Allied Forces intend to use the Hidon to destroy the Empire's main base. The Allies unleash the weapon the base, causing utter devastation and wiping out half of it. The eighteenth mission involves an all-out assault on the rest of the Empire's main base. When its command towers and defenders are destroyed, the enemy flagship Gleia attempts to escape (having the enemy Chiefs of Staff on board), but this too is taken out. The Allied Forces now control around 70% of the Atlantic Ocean, but the Emperor refuses to surrender. The Allies, intent on ending the war, advance to Old Guinea, where the Imperial Palace and the Emperor are located. The nineteenth mission involves hunting down and wiping out two large Imperial fleets attempting to flee to the Pacific Ocean. After this mission, the Allies' Third Fleet advances on the Imperial Palace and captures it after a ferocious battle. However, the Emperor commits suicide before the Allies can capture him. The Emperor's death prevents the quick achievement of a peace treaty and a ceasefire.

The twentieth mission involves exploring an ancient ruin, searching for ancient artefacts. The Empire's forces are present, having resorted to piracy. After the artefacts are acquired, the Chronos crew brings them to the door of the Holy Ground. The opening of the door triggers serious tremors, causing rock to fall from the ceiling. The falling rock damages the Chronos's hull, causing air to leak out. The Chronos escapes in time. In the twenty-first and final mission, the Chronos crew are tasked with investigating the Promethean Holy Ground and discovering the "Stillness". The Chronos races across the Holy Ground acquiring tablets and proceeding to uncover new ones before their signals die out. The charters reveal that the High Council, the leaders of the Promethean Civilisation, ordered the deep submersion of the majority of the Earth into water. The tablets reveal that the Prometheans are aliens, and that the vast majority of them evacuated the planet, returning to the Mother Star before Earth's submersion, with a small number of them choosing to remain. After these tablets are gathered, the Hammerhead arrives again (now with deadlier weapons and a paralysing blaster), its crew furious at the Chronos crew for the intrusion and the damage it has caused to the area, and revealing themselves to be Promethean aliens. A vicious fight ensues, with the Chronos eventually winning. The Hammerhead is mortally damaged. Its crew laments its failure to protect the Holy Ground, before they commit suicide by smashing their vessel into the central energy barrier, destroying it. As a result of this, the central energy barrier deactivates. The Chronos enters the central area, and this causes a Guardian to activate. A very dangerous Guardian of pyramid form. The Chronos fights and destroys it, ending the mission.

In the epilogue, it is confirmed that a geosphere manipulation device found in Holy Ground was used to cause the cataclysmic submersion of the Earth. It is stated that researchers believe that, while it may take time, the water levels will drop and the Earth will eventually return to normal. The game asserts that that technological advance walks hand-in-hand with great tragedy, and that countless battles in the name of noble causes show this all too well. The game also asserts that if humanity is ever to outgrow the fundamental drive to war, it must progress to a more advanced level of consciousness.

== Reception ==
Reception

Aggregate score
Aggregator	Score
Metacritic	71/100

Review scores
Publication	Score
Consoles +	83%
Electronic Gaming Monthly	7.83/10 (Note: Two critics of Electronic Gaming Monthly gave the game each 8/10, and the other 7.5/10.)
Famitsu	30/40
Game Informer	7.5/10
GamePro	4/5
GameSpot	6.9/10
GameZone	7.9/10
IGN	7/10
Official U.S. PlayStation Magazine	4/5
X-Play	3/5

The game received "average" reviews according to the review aggregation website Metacritic. In Japan, Famitsu gave it a score of 30 out of 40.
