= NFL 2K (video game) =

1999 video game

- North American box art, featuring Randy Moss
- Developer: Visual Concepts
- Publisher: Sega (Note: Released under the Sega Sports banner)
- Series: NFL 2K
- Platform: Dreamcast
- Release: NA: September 9, 1999; JP: January 20, 2000
- Genre: Sports (American football)
- Modes: Single player, multiplayer

NFL 2K (sometimes called Sega Sports NFL 2K) is a 1999 American football video game based on the National Football League, developed by Visual Concepts and published by Sega for the Dreamcast. It is the first installment of Sega's NFL 2K series, and was released as a launch title for the Dreamcast in North America on September 9, 1999 and was later released in Japan on January 20, 2000. It was followed by NFL 2K1 in 2000.

== Gameplay ==
The game features all 31 NFL teams and their officially licensed players, with modes including exhibition games, practice, a full season, playoffs and a fantasy draft.

NFL 2K lets players choose from a large selection of plays, run an offense or defense, and execute actions such as passing, running, receiving, tackling, and special‑teams attempts. The passing system allows quarterbacks to distribute the ball to receivers, while the running game has most carries limited to short gains of a few yards. Players can create custom plays, track statistics, trade players, build fantasy teams, and use the VMU to select plays privately, all within stadium environments that support a full season of football activities.

== Development ==
Ahead of the North American launch of the Dreamcast, Sega sought to strengthen its first-party sports lineup. Former Sega of America president Bernie Stolar later said that Sega acquired Visual Concepts for $10 million, regarding the developer as an important part of its strategy for the console. Stolar stated that during negotiations with Electronic Arts, EA sought to become the exclusive sports brand on the Dreamcast, which Sega rejected because it intended to publish sports games developed by Visual Concepts. Electronic Arts ultimately did not support the Dreamcast, leaving Sega's internally published sports games, including NFL 2K, as important components of the console's North American software lineup.

Visual Concepts designed NFL 2K to take advantage of the Dreamcast's increased graphical capabilities. The developers increased the number of player animations from approximately 400 to 1,500 and implemented what Sega's Greg Thomas described as a "perception system", in which individual players reacted dynamically to events occurring on the field. During pre-release coverage, GamePro reported Visual Concepts' claim that the defensive artificial intelligence could adapt to repeated offensive strategies, adjusting its coverage after being beaten twice by the same play.

To reproduce NFL teams and players, Sega and Visual Concepts studied hundreds of recordings of NFL games and modelled more than 700 players, including their physical builds, equipment and statistical attributes. The game also used dynamically generated animation sequences. Player models were divided into separate sections so that collisions could produce different reactions depending on the location and direction of a tackle; for example, a hit to a player's legs could cause them to buckle, while a shoulder tackle could cause them to spin or stumble.

In September 2000, Sega reissued NFL 2K as part of the Sega Sports Collector's Edition Dreamcast bundle in North America, alongside NBA 2K. The package featured a black Dreamcast console and matching controller bearing the Sega Sports logo and was priced at US$169.99. Sega marketed the bundle as a way to familiarise players with both franchises ahead of the release of their online-enabled sequels.

== Reception ==
Reception

Aggregate score
| Aggregator | Score |
|---|---|
| GameRankings | 92% |

Review scores
| Publication | Score |
|---|---|
| AllGame | 4.5/5 |
| CNET Gamecenter | 9/10 |
| Electronic Gaming Monthly | 8/10 (Note: In Electronic Gaming Monthly's review of the game, two critics gave it each a score of 8/10, one gave it 7/10, and the other gave it 9/10.) |
| Famitsu | 34/40 |
| Game Informer | 9.25/10 |
| GameFan | 98% (Note: In GameFan's viewpoint of the game, one critic gave it 99, and the other 97.) |
| GameRevolution | A |
| GameSpot | 9.9/10 |
| GameSpy | 9.5/10 |
| IGN | 9.7/10 |
| Next Generation | 4/5 |

The game received "universal acclaim" according to the review aggregation website GameRankings. Chris Charla of NextGen called it "A visual masterpiece, and a great football game that will, and should, sell systems." In Japan, where the game was ported for release on January 20, 2000, Famitsu gave it a score of 34 out of 40.

The Rookie of GamePro said in one review, "If you own a Dreamcast and love football, you'd be an absolute fool to pass up this game. Even though you won't find a franchise mode in this year's version, NFL 2K is a deep football sim that'll satisfy any pigskin junkie." (Note: GamePro gave the game two 5/5 scores for graphics and sound, 4/5 for control, and 4.5/5 for fun factor in one review.) Scary Larry said in another review, "who wins the gridiron war? It comes down to this: Madden is the best playing game in town, with incredible depth and superior football skills, but NFL 2K is the way to go if you're undecided, because the graphics, sound, and sheer fun of the game far surpass Madden and GameDay." (Note: GamePro gave the game three 5/5 scores for graphics, sound, and fun factor, and 4.5/5 for control in another review.) Argentine magazine Next Level awarded the game 91%, describing it as one of the Dreamcast's best games and recommending it to American football enthusiasts, even if they had to obtain an imported copy.

The game was a finalist for the "Console Sports Game of the Year", "Outstanding Achievement in Sound Design", "Outstanding Achievement in Visual Engineering", and "Outstanding Achievement in Game Play Engineering" awards at the AIAS' 3rd Annual Interactive Achievement Awards, all of which went to Knockout Kings 2000, Medal of Honor, Unreal Tournament, and The Sims, respectively. The game was also a nominee for CNET Gamecenter's 1999 "Dreamcast" award, which went to Soulcalibur.

By February 2000, Japanese magazine Dreamcast Magazine reported that NFL 2K had sold more than 700,000 copies in the United States. By September 2000, the game initially sold 800,000 units, and ultimately went on to sell 1 million units. NFL 2k is the highest grossing Dreamcast game in the US.

== Legacy ==
In a 2005 retrospective, GameSpot described NFL 2K as one of the best games released for the Dreamcast, one of the strongest console launch titles, and one of the most important NFL video games. The site's Ryan MacDonald, who had awarded the game a score of 9.9 out of 10 upon its original release, said retrospectively that he continued to stand by the rating and credited the game with demonstrating the potential of the Dreamcast and influencing later American football games.
