= Armada F/X Racers =

2000 video game

- Developer: Metropolis Digital
- Publisher: Metro3D
- Platform: Game Boy Color
- Release: NA: 25 August 2000
- Genre: Racing
- Mode: Single-player

Armada F/X Racers is a 2000 video game for the Game Boy Color, developed by Metropolis Digital and published by Metro3D. The game is a futuristic-themed racing game based on the 1999 Dreamcast game Armada.

== Gameplay ==
A screenshot of Armada F/X Racers.

F/X Racers is a top-down racing game featuring courses on alien planets across six courses. There are three game modes: 'Campaign' mode involves the player progressing a series of courses by reaching a finalist position in a race and then competing with the other finalist to defeat an boss with their car and power ups, and accumulate the most points in doing so. 'Mission' mode involves single races on courses that have already been completed. A third mode, 'Survival', is available on completion of the campaign, in which bosses must be completed in order. The game features six selectable alien races, each with their own vehicles and driving capabilities.

== Development ==
Armada F/X Racers was announced by Metro3D in December 1999, and was previewed by the publisher at E3 in May 2000. The game was originally slated for an April 2000 release date, but was delayed to 25 August of that year.

== Reception ==
Reception

Review scores
Publication	Score
AllGame	2.5/5
IGN	3/10

F/X Racers received negative reviews. Craig Harris of IGN dismissed the game as "one of the worst top-down racing games I've played", critiquing the "rushed" and "annoying and irritating" gameplay, the "paltry manual", the "choppy" framerate and scrolling engine, and poor sound. Writing for Allgame Nick Woods stated that the cycle of gameplay "gets old and repetitive, making the game fairly easy to defeat", stating "after the first three levels, gameplay begins to be boring and repetitive since you know which monsters wait at the end of each race", finding that the game's "limited charm and usefulness dissipates after one play through".
