= Armada (video game) =

1999 video game

- Developer: Metropolis Digital
- Publisher: Metro3D
- Director: Mark Jordan
- Designers: Mark Jordan; Roger Fang
- Platform: Dreamcast
- Release: NA: November 26, 1999
- Genres: Shooter, role-playing
- Modes: Single-player, multiplayer

Armada is a video game developed by Metropolis Digital and published by Metro3D. It was released for the Sega Dreamcast in North America on November 26, 1999. Armada is a shooter role-playing game (RPG) that allows up to four players to fly about the universe, fighting the enemy, performing missions and improving their ship.

== Plot ==
Earth has been destroyed by the unfathomable Armada, giant space aliens of unknown origin with an unknown purpose. Fleeing in whatever was available, humanity took to the stars in a desperate attempt to survive. Eons later, humans have split into six distinct groups who maintain a shaky alliance against the Armada.

== Development ==
Armada was developed by Metro3D, (formerly Metropolis Digital, Inc.) and was announced in mid-1998 as an online game. The company had previously developed a space-themed, real-time strategy game titled Star Command: Revolution. In May 1999, the game was revealed to be a massively multiplayer online role-playing game in development for the Sega Dreamcast. The game was planned to be released as a launch title for the console on September 9, 1999, but was delayed until late September or early October of that year. The game was delayed again with a projected shipment the week of November 19. Armada was finally made available at retail on November 26, 1999, the day following Thanksgiving. At one time Armada had been scheduled to be released in Japan along with Dark Angel: Vampire Apocalypse in 2000, but both games never made their release in Japanese stores for reasons unknown.

== Reception ==
Reception

Aggregate score
| Aggregator | Score |
|---|---|
| GameRankings | 76% |

Review scores
| Publication | Score |
|---|---|
| AllGame | 4/5 |
| Electronic Gaming Monthly | 5.875/10 (Note: In Electronic Gaming Monthly's review of the game, one critic gave it 6.5/10, two others gave it each a score of 6/10, and the other gave it 5/10.) |
| EP Daily | 7.5/10 |
| Game Informer | 6.5/10 |
| GameFan | 81% |
| GameRevolution | B+ |
| GameSpot | 7.8/10 |
| GameSpy | 9/10 |
| IGN | 9.1/10 |
| Next Generation | 3/5 |
| RPGamer | 2/5 |

The game received favorable reviews according to the review aggregation website GameRankings. Greg Orlando of NextGen said, "As a solitary experience, Armada's RPG elements make the game worth a look – and maybe a second one, too. These unfriendly skies (and galaxies), however, are really meant to be traversed in the company of others."

The D-Pad Destroyer of GamePro said that the game was "a Dreamcast shooter fan's dream, and it recalls the classics of the genre, like Asteroids, Xevious and a touch of R-Type. Hardcore shooter fans might be put off by its wide-open, non-level-based structure, but anyone who likes a little bad-guy-blastin' action should at least give Armada a rent." (Note: GamePro gave the game 4/5 for graphics, and three 4.5/5 scores for sound, control, and fun factor in one review.) In another GamePro review, Lamchop said that the game "features passable sound and adequate control, though it doesn't take advantage of the Dreamcast's power in many areas. Still, Armada is compelling enough to keep you up until 2:00 am [sic] trying to finish the next mission." (Note: GamePro gave the game 2.5/5 for graphics, 3/5 for sound, 3.5/5 for control, and 4/5 for fun factor in another review.)

The game was a nominee for "Console Action Game of the Year" during the Academy of Interactive Arts & Sciences' 3rd Annual Interactive Achievement Awards, which ultimately was given to Crazy Taxi.

== Legacy ==
Armada F/X Racers for the Game Boy Color, a racing game which takes place in the same universe as Armada, was developed by Metro3D and released in 2000. A direct sequel to Armada was under development, originally for the Dreamcast, then for the Xbox and PlayStation 2 under various titles including Armada II, Armada's Revenge, Armada 2: Exodus, and Armada 2: Star Command. However, due to repeated delays and redesigns along with limited resources, the game was canceled after spending over four years in varying degrees of development.

In early 2005, EvStream, an independent game development studio formed by former Metro3D members, purchased the rights for Armada. An online continuation titled Armada Online has been announced and is under development by Roger Fang and Mark Jordan. An alpha of the game was released.
