= NFL 2K =

- Genre: Sports (American football)
- Developer: Visual Concepts
- Publisher: Sega
- Platforms: Dreamcast, PlayStation 2, Xbox, GameCube
- First release: NFL 2K; September 9, 1999
- Latest release: ESPN NFL 2K5; July 20, 2004

NFL 2K is an American football video game series developed by Visual Concepts and published by Sega. The series was originally exclusive to Sega's Dreamcast due to the absence of EA Sports's Madden NFL series on the system. As the foremost "2K" title, it marked the beginning of a running athletics series that eventually led to the spin-off of 2K's sports publishing business under the name of 2K Sports. Upon the Dreamcast's discontinuation, the series continued to be published for other sixth generation game systems and became the chief competitor of the Madden series.

After the competitively priced NFL 2K5 significantly reduced sales of that year's Madden release, EA signed an exclusivity deal with the NFL that made Madden NFL the only series allowed to use NFL team and player names.

In 2020, 2K announced the NFL 2K series would return in 2021 as an arcade video game. In May 2021, however, 2K announced that the game had been delayed until March 2022; it was delayed multiple times after that.

In April 2024, 2K Games released a mobile game titled NFL 2K Playmakers, a card game similar to Madden NFL's "Ultimate Team" mode. On April 30, 2025, it was announced that the game would be shutting down on June 30.

== Games ==
Aggregate review scores
Game	GameRankings	Metacritic
NFL 2K	(DC) 91.53	—
NFL 2K1	(DC) 94.50	(DC) 97
NFL 2K2	(DC) 89.35 (PS2) 86.85 (Xbox) 84.84	(DC) 90 (Xbox) 87 (PS2) 85
NFL 2K3	(Xbox) 89.79 (GC) 89.45 (PS2) 88.10	(PS2) 93 (GC) 92
ESPN NFL Football	(Xbox) 89.27 (PS2) 88.12	(Xbox) 91 (PS2) 91
ESPN NFL 2K5	(Xbox) 90.52 (PS2) 87.84	(Xbox) 92 (PS2) 90

=== NFL 2K ===
The series was introduced by Sega to address EA Sports's decision not to publish games, including the Madden NFL series, for the Dreamcast. The first installment, NFL 2K, was released exclusively for the system, in time for its September 9, 1999 launch in North America. All 31 NFL teams were included in the game (including the returning Browns) along with alumni teams, and All-Pro teams for the AFC, NFC, and NFL. The game received positive reception upon its release, with praises for its visuals, presentation, and overall gameplay.

=== NFL 2K1 ===
A sequel, NFL 2K1, was released for the Dreamcast on September 7, 2000, to critical acclaim. Improvements over its predecessor include a significant amount of new player animations, larger play-books, improved AI, and tweaks to the running game, the passing game, and defense. 2K1 also introduced a multi-season franchise mode and online play.

=== NFL 2K2 ===
With the demise of the Dreamcast, the NFL 2K series was re-positioned as the main multi-platform rival to the Madden NFL series. NFL 2K2, the third installment, was released on September 19, 2001, for the Dreamcast. PlayStation 2 and Xbox versions of the game were later released with enhanced graphics. Reception for the game was positive, with critics noting improved AI, enhancements to the passing game, and new player animations. However, the franchise mode was criticized for lacking depth, as it remained nearly unchanged from 2K1. The Houston Texans were included in the game, featuring stock players as the team did not yet have a real-life roster.

=== NFL 2K3 ===
NFL 2K3 was released for PlayStation 2, Xbox, and GameCube in August 2002. The game featured licensed ESPN-styled presentation, with halftime reports, player awards, and post-game and weekly wrap-ups. ESPN's Dan Patrick is featured in the opening intro. Franchise mode was greatly expanded upon in 2K3, and featured interactive menus along with much greater depth. Historic teams were included for the first time, and current real-life coaches were introduced to the series (along with the ability to create ones). 2K3 was the first game in the series to include Xbox Live capabilities.

=== ESPN NFL Football ===
ESPN NFL Football was released in September 2003 for PlayStation 2 and Xbox. It is the only game in the series not featuring 2K in the title; 2K4 was instead relegated to the bottom corner of the box art. The game would expand upon the series' ESPN license, with players receiving reports and highlights from ESPN's Chris Berman and Suzy Kolber. New features were added such as first-person football and "The Crib", which serves as the player's own digital apartment and trophy room.

=== ESPN NFL 2K5 ===
With the cancellation of NFL GameDay (989 Sports) on PlayStation 2 and the NFL Fever (Microsoft Game Studios) franchise, the series truly became Madden NFL's primary competition. In what Grantland later called "one of the greatest, most insidious guerrilla-warfare moves in the history of video game competition", Sega released ESPN NFL 2K5 in July 2004 for $19.99, giving the game significant market share versus the $49.95 Madden NFL. One EA developer recalled that Sega's aggressive pricing "scared the hell out of us"; EA later reduced Madden NFL's price to $29.95. In December 2004, however, EA signed an exclusive agreement with the NFL for an undisclosed amount of money, making Madden NFL the only series allowed to use NFL team and player names. Comparatively, the NFL signed a similar six year exclusivity deal with Visa Inc. worth $400 million in January 2004. EA also signed an agreement with ESPN to become the only licensee of ESPN's brand in sports games on all platforms. This was an immense blow to Sega's franchise in their MLB, NBA, and NHL series. In 2020, EA signed an extension with the NFL, giving them sole licensing rights through the 2025 season.

== Voice commentary ==
The play-by-play and color commentary in each game is done by the fictional sportscasters Dan Stevens (Terry McGovern) and Peter O'Keefe (Jay Styne). Fictional reporter Michelle Westphal (Marcia Perry) provides occasional sideline reports from NFL 2K through NFL 2K3, while ESPN's real-life Suzy Kolber provides reports in ESPN NFL Football and ESPN NFL 2K5. Pre-game and post-game shows, halftime reports, and weekly SportsCenter wrap-ups are hosted by ESPN's Chris Berman in the latter two games.

Terry McGovern and Jay Styne returned as Dan Stevens and Peter O'Keefe in All-Pro Football 2K8.

== Cover athletes ==
Game	Platform	Cover athlete	
Game	Platform	Name	Team
NFL 2K	Dreamcast	Randy Moss	Minnesota Vikings
NFL 2K1	Dreamcast	Randy Moss	Minnesota Vikings
NFL 2K2	Dreamcast, PlayStation 2, Xbox	Randy Moss	Minnesota Vikings
NFL 2K3	GameCube, PlayStation 2, Xbox	Brian Urlacher	Chicago Bears
ESPN NFL Football	PlayStation 2, Xbox	Warren Sapp	Tampa Bay Buccaneers
ESPN NFL 2K5	PlayStation 2, Xbox	Terrell Owens	Philadelphia Eagles
NFL 2K Playmakers	Mobile	C. J. Stroud	Houston Texans

== See also ==
- All-Pro Football 2K8
- NCAA College Football 2K2: Road to the Rose Bowl
- NCAA College Football 2K3
- Madden NFL, another NFL-based series of video games
