= Stake: Fortune Fighters =

2003 video game

- North American cover art
- Developer: Gameness Art
- Publisher: Metro3D
- Producer: Owen Wu
- Platform: Xbox
- Release: NA: May 5, 2003; EU: June 6, 2003
- Genre: Fighting
- Modes: Single-player, multiplayer

Stake: Fortune Fighters is a fighting video game that was released on the Xbox in 2003. It was developed by Taiwanese company Gameness Art Software and published by Metro3D.

== Characters ==
- Anglesite
- Baron
- Barty
- Habba Kenji
- Pharo
- Void The Monk
- Yen Fan
- Yen Yen
- Unlockable Boss Character: Thor

== Development ==
Stake: Fortune Fighters was developed by Gameness Art Software and published by Metro3D. Stake is the first game created by Gameness Art, which was founded by the game's producer Owen Wu in Taipei, Taiwan in August 2000. Stake was originally developed for PC in 2001, but was converted to the Xbox beginning in July 2002. Wu explained that developing the game for Xbox was quick and easy due to the console being "very similar in architecture" to a PC.

Graphically, Stake features environments consisting of about 30,000 polygons each and characters made up of about 5,000 polygons each. The developer extensively utilized bump mapping, shadow buffing, and pixel shaders to enhance the game's realism. Wu wanted to make the gameplay in Stake unique by combining aspects of multiplayer fighting games and first-person shooters. The use of free-for-all multiplayer fighting was heavily influenced by the Capcom game Power Stone, though Wu found the stages in that game to be cramped and "aimed to open up the levels to make more Death Match style action throughout the game" and added a time limit and a frag count. Full online play was not implemented due to developmental time constraints. It has been discovered that by waiting on the main menu, the game's trailer will show. It contains a much more polished looking version of the game with better textures, models and lighting. It is unknown if it shows gameplay of the PC version or Xbox during mid-production. Comparing it to the final game, there are many differences in the artstyle and overall feel of the game. Many characters designs were drastically changed, such as Anglesite Obsidia being more bulky with a different color pallette. Also changed is their "Rage Moves" being more identical to what they are referred to in the manual of the game. At the end of development it seems as if everything was completely reworked from scratch and made the game look and feel to many people- unfinished.

== Reception ==
Reception

Aggregate score
Aggregator	Score
Metacritic	26/100

Review scores
Publication	Score
GameSpot	3.6/10
GameZone	3.6/10
IGN	2.3/10
X-Play	1/5

The game received "generally unfavorable reviews" according to the review aggregation website Metacritic.
