= NFL 2K3 =

2002 video game

- North American cover art, featuring Brian Urlacher
- Developer: Visual Concepts
- Publisher: Sega (Note: Released under the Sega Sports banner)
- Series: NFL 2K
- Platforms: PlayStation 2, Xbox, GameCube
- Release: PlayStation 2: NA: August 13, 2002; EU: March 28, 2003; Xbox: NA: August 13, 2002; EU: April 17, 2003; GameCube: NA: August 20, 2002; EU: March 28, 2003
- Genre: Sports (American football)
- Modes: Single-player, multiplayer

NFL 2K3 is a 2002 American football video game developed by Visual Concepts and published by Sega for the PlayStation 2, Xbox, and GameCube. It is the fourth installment of Sega's NFL 2K series, as well as the only game in the series to be released for the GameCube. The game was followed by ESPN NFL Football in 2003.

== Reception ==
Reception

Aggregate score
Aggregator	Score		
Aggregator	GameCube	PS2	Xbox
Metacritic	92/100	93/100	92/100

Review scores
Publication	Score		
Publication	GameCube	PS2	Xbox
Electronic Gaming Monthly	N/A	9/10	N/A
Famitsu	N/A	33/40	N/A
Game Informer	9/10	9/10	9.5/10
GamePro	5/5	5/5	5/5
GameRevolution	A−	A−	A−
GameSpot	9.1/10	9.6/10	9.1/10
GameSpy	4.5/5	N/A	4.5/5
GameZone	8.8/10	9.3/10	8.9/10
IGN	9/10	9.2/10	9.1/10
Nintendo Power	4.1/5	N/A	N/A
Official U.S. PlayStation Magazine	N/A	4.5/5	N/A
Official Xbox Magazine (US)	N/A	N/A	9.3/10
Maxim	9/10	9/10	9/10

The game received "universal acclaim" on all platforms according to the review aggregation website Metacritic. In Japan, where the PlayStation 2 version was localized for release on December 26, 2002, Famitsu gave it a score of 33 out of 40.

GameSpot named NFL 2K3 the best Xbox game, and second-best PlayStation 2 game, of August 2002. It won the publication's annual "Best Traditional Sports Game on GameCube" and "Best Traditional Sports Game on Xbox" awards, and was a runner-up for "Best Online Game on Xbox", "Best Online Game on PlayStation 2" and "Game of the Year on Xbox".
