= NFL 2K1 =

2000 sports video game

- North American box art, featuring Randy Moss
- Developer: Visual Concepts
- Publisher: Sega (Note: Released under the Sega Sports banner)
- Series: NFL 2K
- Platform: Dreamcast
- Release: NA: September 7, 2000; JP: March 29, 2001
- Genre: Sports (American football)
- Modes: Single-player, multiplayer

NFL 2K1 is a 2000 American football video game developed by Visual Concepts and published by Sega for the Dreamcast. It is the second installment of Sega's NFL 2K series, and features remediation as well as multiple in-game product placements, such as Dreamcast ads in stadiums. It was followed by NFL 2K2, the last game in the series to be released for the Dreamcast, in 2001.

In the early 2000s, SegaNet was shut down and the online features of the game were shut down as well. However, in July 2017, the game's online features were brought back thanks to DreamPi. The rest of the 2K titles on the Dreamcast have since had their online components revived and are playable online today.

== Reception ==
Reception

Aggregate score
Aggregator	Score
Metacritic	97/100

Review scores
Publication	Score
CNET Gamecenter	9/10
Electronic Gaming Monthly	9.67/10 (Note: In Electronic Gaming Monthly's review of the game, one critic gave it a score of 10/10, and the rest gave it each a score of 9.5/10.)
EP Daily	9.5/10
Famitsu	32/40
Game Informer	9.5/10
GameFan	97% (Note: In GameFan's viewpoint of the game, one critic gave it 96, and the other 97.)
GameRevolution	A
GameSpot	9.9/10
GameSpy	9/10
IGN	9.5/10
Next Generation	5/5
Maxim	5/5

NFL 2K1 received "universal acclaim" according to the review aggregation website Metacritic. Rob Smolka of NextGen called it "A great-playing game, both online and offline, and a significant advance over last year's version." In Japan, where the game was ported for release on March 29, 2001, Famitsu gave it a score of 32 out of 40.

Atomic Dawg of GamePro said in one review, "In a world of video game football, NFL 2K1 is Super Bowl-bound—with topnotch replay featuring online gameplay [...] and a vicious all-pro difficulty level. Any Dreamcast football player who passes up this game should be fined." (Note: GamePro gave the game three 5/5 scores for graphics, sound, and fun factor, and 4.5/5 for control in one review.) In another GamePro review, Cheat Monkey said, "Football fans looking for a realistic videogame should look no further. NFL 2K1 stands helmet and shoulderpads above the rest, which is easy to do since it's the only new Dreamcast football game available. With improvements made over the already incredible NFL 2K, this year's NFL game on the Dreamcast is all a football fan could wish for." (Note: GamePro gave the game two 5/5 scores for graphics and fun factor, and two 4.5/5 scores for sound and control in another review.)

The game won the awards for "Dreamcast Game of the Year", "Multiplayer Game of the Year", and "Sports Game of the Year" at the Electronic Gaming Monthly 2000 Gamers' Choice Awards (the latter at the 2000 Readers' Choice Awards); and was a runner-up for the overall Game of the Year award, which went to Tony Hawk's Pro Skater 2. The game also won "Best Dreamcast Game" and "Best Sports Game (Traditional)" awards at GameSpot's Best and Worst of 2000 Awards, and was a runner-up for the "Best Multiplayer Game" and "Game of the Year" awards, both of which went to Quake III Arena and Chrono Cross, respectively. The staff wrote that they "argued for more than an hour over whether Square's Chrono Cross or Sega's NFL 2K1 should win the award for Game of the Year." The game won the awards for "Best Multiplayer Console Game" and "Best Console Sports Game" at The Electric Playground's 2000 Blister Awards, and was nominated for the "DC Game of the Year", "Console Game of the Year", "Gamers' Choice Dreamcast", and "Best Game of the Year" awards, all of which went to Jet Grind Radio (the former two), Tony Hawk's Pro Skater 2 and Shenmue (tied in with the third award), and Deus Ex, respectively.

Studies have been done on how effective in-game commercialization is in sports games on people, including NFL 2K1.

According to PC Data, NFL 2K1 sold 900,000 units in 2000. It is the second highest-grossing Dreamcast game in the US, after the original NFL 2K.

== Legacy ==
NFL 2K1 has been retrospectively noted for its role in the development of online console sports games. In a 2005 retrospective on the NFL 2K series, GameSpot described the network-enabled Dreamcast as signalling the end of console football's previously offline nature, with NFL 2K1 becoming the first Sega sports title to fulfil the system's promise of online play. The publication noted that Sega introduced online sports gaming ahead of Sony, Microsoft and EA Sports, and regarded services such as SegaNet as an indication of the direction in which sports games were heading.
