= NBA 2K2 =

2001 basketball video game

- Box art featuring Allen Iverson
- Developer: Visual Concepts
- Publisher: Sega
- Series: NBA 2K
- Platforms: Dreamcast, GameCube, PlayStation 2, Xbox
- Release: Dreamcast: NA: October 23, 2001; EU: March 8, 2002; PlayStation 2: NA: January 15, 2002; Xbox: NA: February 26, 2002; GameCube: NA: March 20, 2002
- Genre: Sports
- Modes: Single-player, multiplayer

NBA 2K2 is a 2001 sports video game developed by Visual Concepts and published by Sega for Dreamcast, PlayStation 2, Xbox and GameCube. NBA 2K2 featured more street courts such as Mosswood, Fonde Rec Center, Venice Beach, etc. The cover athlete is Allen Iverson of the Philadelphia 76ers.

It is also one of the few games to release on all four 6th generation home platforms, and the only game to release on all four in North America.

== Overview ==
NBA 2K2 now offers a number of new features designed to improve upon Sega Sports' basketball franchise, which began on the Dreamcast in 1999. In addition to the NBA teams, players, and stadiums from the 2001–02 season, the game includes five legends teams starring legends such as Michael Jordan, Larry Bird, Julius Erving, Wilt Chamberlain, Magic Johnson, and Bill Russell.

Each player's abilities reflect those based on the 2001–02 season, so the location of shots is important depending on the athlete. Moves such as crossover dribbles, pump fakes, speed bursts, and both icon and directional passing allow players multiple options to move the ball down the court. While approaching the net, players can press a single button to pass to the man closest to the basket or use their athlete's size advantage to back down a defender. Players can also call for a pick with a press of the button, pass out of a shot, or select one of four in-game offensive plays from a roster of 16.

Defensive moves include steals, a combination block and jump button, as well as the ability to face up a ball handler, double-team a star player, commit an intentional foul, and call one of seven defensive sets such as Man-to-Man or Half-Court Trap. Before playing a game, adjustments can be made for game speed, quarter length, and difficulty. In-game features include instant replay and a choice of five different camera angles. User statistics as well as season and franchise progress can be saved after each game.

=== Features ===
Modes of play include Exhibition, an adjustable Season (from 14 to 82 games), Practice, Tourney, Playoffs, Fantasy, where players can create a custom tournament or league after drafting, and Franchise, which involves signing free agents, cutting players, making trades, and scouting for new talent before embarking on consecutive seasons. Players can also edit or create a team using ten custom logos as well as design their own star athlete from scratch.

== Development ==
More than 30 people worked on the game.

== Reception ==
Reception

Aggregate score
Aggregator	Score			
Aggregator	Dreamcast	GameCube	PS2	Xbox
Metacritic	93/100	90/100	89/100	90/100

Review scores
Publication	Score			
Publication	Dreamcast	GameCube	PS2	Xbox
Electronic Gaming Monthly	8.83/10 (Note: Two critics of Electronic Gaming Monthly gave the Dreamcast version each a score of 9/10, and the other gave it 8.5/10.)	9/10	8.83/10 (Note: Two critics of Electronic Gaming Monthly gave the PlayStation 2 version each a score of 9/10, and the other gave it 8.5/10.)	9/10
EP Daily	9/10	N/A	N/A	9/10
Game Informer	9.25/10	9/10	8.75/10	9/10
GameRevolution	N/A	N/A	B+	N/A
GameSpot	9.7/10	8.6/10	9.1/10	8.9/10
GameSpy	90% (PDC) 9/10	N/A	(favorable)	N/A
GameZone	N/A	N/A	9/10	N/A
IGN	9.4/10	8.6/10	8.6/10	8.8/10
Nintendo Power	N/A	4.5/5	N/A	N/A
Official U.S. PlayStation Magazine	N/A	N/A	5/5	N/A
Official Xbox Magazine (US)	N/A	N/A	N/A	9.1/10
The Cincinnati Enquirer	N/A	4.5/5	4.5/5	4.5/5
Maxim	N/A	N/A	5/5	N/A

The game received "universal acclaim" on all platforms except the PlayStation 2 version, which received "generally favorable reviews", according to video game review aggregator Metacritic.

Tokyo Drifter of GamePro's January 2002 issue said that the Dreamcast version "rectifies all other gripes about the previous two incarnations and officially achieves a top ranking in its field." (Note: GamePro gave the Dreamcast version two 5/5 scores for graphics and fun factor, and two 4.5/5 scores for sound and control.) Two issues later, he called the PlayStation 2 version "the game to get for PlayStation 2 basketball simulation fans, even if it seems like a warm-up for a fully revamped return next year. That's still a long way off, and it's hard to resist the total package of pretty graphics, solid controls, and a challenging game of b-ball that you can pick up today." (Note: GamePro gave the PlayStation 2 version two 4.5/5 scores for graphics and fun factor, 4/5 for sound, and 5/5 for control.) Another issue later, he called the Xbox version "the complete package for basketball on the Xbox." (Note: GamePro gave the Xbox version three 5/5 scores for graphics, control, and fun factor, and 4/5 for sound.) Still another issue later, he said that the GameCube version "may be the last of the various incarnations of Sega's hoop franchise to appear this year, but it certainly was worth the wait." (Note: GamePro gave the GameCube version two 4.5/5 scores for graphics and fun factor, and two 4/5 scores for sound and control.)

The Dreamcast version won the award for "Best Sports, Traditional Game" at GameSpot's Best and Worst of 2001 Awards, and was nominated for the "Best Dreamcast Game" award, which went to Phantasy Star Online. It was also nominated for the "Console Sports" award at the Academy of Interactive Arts & Sciences' 5th Annual Interactive Achievement Awards, which went to Tony Hawk's Pro Skater 3. The same console version won the award for "Dreamcast Game of the Year" (which it shared with NFL 2K2) at The Electric Playground's 2001 Blister Awards, and was also nominated for the "Best Multiplayer Console Game" (along with said game) and "Best Console Sports Game" awards, but lost both to Halo: Combat Evolved and Madden NFL 2002, respectively.

In a 2016 retrospective, German magazine MANIAC ranked NBA 2K2 21st among its 25 best Dreamcast games, stating that the game surpassed the contemporary NBA Live series with its technology and controls, and describing it as one of the Dreamcast's sports highlights.
