= The Greatest Adventure: Stories from the Bible =

- Frame of the episode "The Creation". (From left to right): Seth, Storyteller, Moki, Margo, Derek, Nod children.
- Genre: Action; Adventure; Drama; Christianity
- Based on: The Bible
- Written by: Harvey Bullock (1985-1987); Ric Estrada (1985-1987, 1991-1992); Dennis Marks (1986-1987, 1988-1990); Bruce D. Johnson (1987); Robert Taylor (1987); Lew Saw (1988); Kay Wright (1988); Jim Willoughby (1989-1990); Karran Eccles Wright (1990-1992)
- Directed by: Ray Patterson (1985–1986); Don Lusk (1987–1992)
- Voices of: Darleen Carr; Darryl Hickman (1989–1992); Terry McGovern (1985–1989); Rob Paulsen
- Narrated by: Michael Rye (opening)
- Theme music composer: Hoyt Curtin
- Composers: Hoyt Curtin (entire run); Gary William Friedman (1988); Tom Worrall (1988 (Note: Additional music in 1989)); Albert Lloyd Olson (1991); Vaughn Johnson (1992); Russell Fox (choral music, 1987 and 1989)
- Country of origin: United States
- Original language: English
- No. of episodes: 13

Production
- Executive producers: William Hanna; Joseph Barbera; Paul Sabella (1990-1991)
- Producer: Kay Wright
- Editors: Gil Iverson (entire run); Tim Iverson (1991–1992); Tom Gleason (1992)
- Running time: 25–30 minutes
- Production company: Hanna-Barbera Productions

Original release
- Release: April 26, 1985 – August 19, 1992

The Greatest Adventure: Stories from the Bible is an American animated direct-to-video film series produced by Hanna-Barbera Productions that tells of three young adventurers who travel back in time to watch biblical events take place. Thirteen videos were released between April 26, 1985 and August 19, 1992.

== Overview ==
Derek and Margo, two young archaeologists, are on a dig accompanied by "their nomad friend", a boy named Moki. They find themselves trapped in a sinking whirlpool of sand, finally the dust settles, they looked in awe at a vast chamber, filled with giant relics and artifacts from another civilization, there come across a far end of the cavern a door with a strange inscription in an ancient ruin that turns out to be a portal through time as the narrator said "All who enter into these portals passed through time". Though the introduction is the same in all videos, each episode sends the three friends into a different story from the Bible. They often interact with principal figures from each story, but without any significant effect upon the plot so as not to alter the course of history; in other episodes, they arrive decades after the events depicted in the Bible and are relayed the story by a firsthand witness.

The episodes were not released in an order consistent with the Biblical chronology, but can be construed to give a coherent story beginning with "The Creation" and ending with "The Easter Story". The first six episodes, released simultaneously, relate Old Testament stories, with episodes pertaining to the life of Jesus being added among some additional Old Testament stories as the series progressed.

Each individual episode featured celebrity voices in principal Biblical roles.

== Production and distribution ==
The series was initially conceived by Hanna-Barbera co-founder Joseph Barbera some seventeen years before it was produced, but he had difficulty in procuring support for the project. Eventually, however, Hanna-Barbera's parent company Taft Broadcasting agreed to provide funding, and the first video was released in 1985, then Turner Home Entertainment continued production after they bought Hanna-Barbera in 1991. Sparrow-Star Song assisted with distribution, releasing all thirteen episodes on VHS, one episode per tape. Five of these episodes ("The Miracles of Jesus", "David and Goliath", "Noah's Ark", "The Easter Story", and "Moses") were released on DVD in 2006.

In 2024, 39 years after its production began, the series made its television debut among the inaugural offerings of digital television network MeTV Toons, which draws some of its programming from the Hanna-Barbera library. MeTV Toons aired the program on Sunday mornings until February 16, 2025.

== Voice cast ==
=== Main ===
- Darleen Carr – Margo
- Darryl Hickman – Derek (1989–1992)
- Terry McGovern – Derek (1985–1989)
- Rob Paulsen – Moki
- Michael Rye – Narrator (main titles), Sebel (in "Samson and Delilah")

=== Special guest stars ===
- Adrienne Barbeau – Mary Magdalene (in "The Easter Story"), Queen Vashti (in "Queen Esther")
- Alan Oppenheimer – Jonah (in "Jonah"), Belshazzar (in "Daniel and the Lion's Den"), Melon Merchant (in "The Nativity"), Wise Man #2 (in "The Nativity")
- Barry Bostwick – Joseph (in "Joseph and his Brothers")
- Bruce McGill –
- Charlotte Rae – Noah's wife (in "Noah's Ark")
- David Ackroyd – Angel (in "The Nativity"), Jesus Christ (in "The Miracles of Jesus")
- Dean Jones – King Ahasuerus (in "Queen Esther")
- Ed Asner – Joshua (in "Joshua and the Battle of Jericho")
- Gavin MacLeod – Daniel (in "Daniel and the Lion's Den")
- Gregory Harrison – Joseph (in "The Nativity")
- Harold Gould – Benjamin (in "The Miracles of Jesus")
- Helen Hunt – Mary (in "The Nativity")
- Helen Slater – Queen Esther (in "Queen Esther")
- Herschel Bernardi – Goliath (in "David and Goliath")
- James Earl Jones – Pharaoh (in "Moses")
- James Whitmore – Moses (in "Moses")
- Jeffrey Tambor – Eli (in "The Nativity"), Peter ("The Easter Story")
- Joe Spano – Jesus (in "The Easter Story")
- John Randolph –
- Les Tremayne – the Storyteller (in "The Creation"), God (in "The Creation")
- Linda Purl – Delilah (in "Samson and Delilah")
- Lorne Greene – Noah (in "Noah's Ark")
- Marc Singer – Adam (in "The Creation")
- Michael Constantine –
- Perry King – Samson (in "Samson and Delilah")
- Richard Libertini – Apple Merchant (in "The Creation")
- Richard Thomas – Mark (in "The Easter Story")
- Robby Benson – David (in "David and Goliath")
- Ron Rifkin – Mordecai (in "Queen Esther")
- Roscoe Lee Browne – Magus (in "The Nativity")
- Stephanie Zimbalist – Eve (in "The Creation")
- Tim Curry – The Serpent (in "The Creation"), Judas Iscariot (in "The Easter Story")
- Vincent Price – King Herod (in "The Nativity")
- Werner Klemperer – Haman (in "Queen Esther")

=== Additional voices ===
- Allan Johnson –
- Allan Lurie –
- Andre Stojka – Lead Heckler (in "Noah's Ark"), King Saul's Councilor (in "David and Goliath")
- B.J. Ward – Haman's Wife (in "Queen Esther")
- Barry Dennen – Senel (in "The Easter Story")
- Bernard Erhard – Saul (in "David and Goliath")
- Bill Woodson – Simon (in "The Easter Story")
- Brock Peters – Priest (in "Samson and Delilah")
- David Mendenhall – Seth (in "The Creation")
- Dena Dietrich – Belshazarr's Mother (in "Daniel and the Lion's Den")
- Dick Gautier –
- Dorian Harewood – Roman Guard (in "The Easter Story")
- Ed Gilbert – Balak (in "The Easter Story"), Micah (in "Jonah")
- Frank Welker – Lions, Soldier (in "Daniel and the Lion's Den"); Monkey, Roman Soldier (in "The Nativity")
- Fredricka Weber –
- George DiCenzo –
- George Hearn – Retainer (in "Queen Esther")
- Henry Corden – Khalil (in "Daniel and the Lion's Den")
- Henry Polic II – Secal (in "Daniel and the Lion's Den")
- Jerry Dexter –
- Joseph Ruskin –
- Keene Curtis – Pontius Pilate (in "The Easter Story")
- Kristoffer Tabori – Young Jonah (in "Jonah")
- Mariette Hartley – Rahab
- Michael Bell – Eliab, Philistine Soldier (in "David and Goliath")
- Michael Nouri –
- Nancy Dussault – Martha (in "Jonah")
- Nicholas Guest –
- Paul Eiding –
- Paul Lukather –
- Peter Cullen – King of Nineveh (in "Jonah"), Japeth (in "Noah's Ark")
- Peter Mark Richman –
- Peter Renaday –
- René Auberjonois –
- Richard Dysart – Aaron (in “Moses”)
- Richard Erdman – Egyptian Magician (in "Moses")
- Scott Grimes – Yasha (in "The Nativity")
- Stan Jones –
- Tony Jay – Caiaphas (in "The Easter Story"), God, Man (in "Jonah"), Jerusalem Man #3 (in "The Easter Story")
- Vic Perrin –
- Virginia Gregg – Miriam (in "Samson and Delilah")
- William Wright –
- Zale Kessler –

== Episodes ==
No.	Title	Directed by	Story by	Storyboarded by	Original release date
1	"Moses"	Ray Patterson	Harvey Bullock	Ric Estrada	April 26, 1985
The trio witnesses the ten plagues of Egypt and follow Moses through the parting of the Red Sea. Adapted from the Book of Exodus.
2	"David and Goliath"	Ray Patterson	Harvey Bullock	Ric Estrada	April 25, 1986
The three meet David and eventually see him defeat Goliath. Adapted from the First Book of Samuel.
3	"Joshua and the Battle of Jericho"	Ray Patterson	Harvey Bullock	Ric Estrada	April 25, 1986
The trio find themselves ensnared in the Battle of Jericho. Adapted from the Book of Joshua.
4	"Samson and Delilah"	Ray Patterson	Harvey Bullock	Ric Estrada	April 25, 1986
The protagonists find themselves witnessing the story of Samson and Delilah. Adapted from the Book of Judges.
5	"Noah's Ark (Noah and the Ark)"	Ray Patterson	Harvey Bullock	Ric Estrada	April 25, 1986
The protagonists find themselves aboard Noah's Ark. Adapted from the Book of Genesis.
6	"Daniel and the Lion's Den"	Ray Patterson	Dennis Marks	Ric Estrada	April 25, 1986
The trio find themselves in Babylon, where they witness the miracle of Daniel in the lions' den. Adapted from the Book of Daniel.
7	"The Nativity"	Don Lusk	Bruce D. Johnson and Harvey Bullock (story adaptation), Dennis Marks (teleplay)	Ric Estrada and Robert Taylor	October 15, 1987
The trio witnesses the birth of Jesus. Adapted from the Gospel of Matthew.
8	"The Creation"	Don Lusk	Dennis Marks	Lew Saw and Kay Wright	July 15, 1988
The three protagonists listen to a storyteller recount the creation as well as the Fall. At the same time, they learn their own lessons in honesty after tricking a gardener into giving them fruit for free. Adapted from the Book of Genesis.
9	"The Easter Story"	Don Lusk	Dennis Marks	Jim Willoughby	March 15, 1989
Mark describes the last days of Jesus' life, leading up to the crucifixion and resurrection. Adapted from the Gospel of Mark.
10	"Joseph and His Brothers"	Don Lusk	Dennis Marks and Karran Eccles Wright	Jim Willoughby	November 8, 1990
The trio befriend Joseph and learn about his coat of many colors. Adapted from the Book of Genesis.
11	"The Miracles of Jesus"	Don Lusk	Karran Eccles Wright	Ric Estrada	September 26, 1991
The time travelers encounter an elderly version of the young man raised from the dead in the city of Nain, who recounts the various miracles of Jesus. Adapted from the Gospel of Luke.
12	"Queen Esther"	Don Lusk	Karran Eccles Wright	Ric Estrada	February 27, 1992
Esther and Mordecai expose the duplicity of Haman. Adapted from the Book of Esther.
13	"Jonah"	Don Lusk	Karran Eccles Wright	Ric Estrada	August 19, 1992
Jonah recounts the story of his journey to Nineveh and being swallowed by a fish. Adapted from the Book of Jonah.
