= All-Pro Football 2K8 =

2007 video game

- PlayStation 3 cover
- Developer: Visual Concepts
- Publisher: 2K
- Platforms: PlayStation 3, Xbox 360
- Release: NA: July 16, 2007
- Genre: Sports
- Modes: Single-player, multiplayer

All-Pro Football 2K8 is an American football game for seventh generation consoles. All-Pro Football 2K8 is the first football game to be published by 2K since EA Sports purchased exclusive licenses to the intellectual properties of the NFL and NFLPA. John Elway, Barry Sanders, and Jerry Rice appear on the cover.

== Overview ==
All-Pro Football 2K8 features a fictional league called the "All-Pro League", or 'APL'. The APL consists of 24 teams that are grouped into six divisions of four teams each. The league runs a sixteen-game schedule and holds a championship game at the end of the playoffs, similar to the NFL.

Since the exclusivity deal the NFL has with EA only covers team licenses, 2K contracted the individual rights to over 240 retired NFL players to appear in the game.

Even though there are no NFL teams in the game, the player can still create teams that resemble their NFL counterparts. A Create-a-Player feature allows the user to add in players that were not included in the roster.

=== Teams ===
Many of the teams in the game have one or more aspects that are thinly veiled references to other elements of popular culture. While some link to sports teams past and present, others refer to TV, films, cars, comic books, American history and even Native American tradition.

- Arizona Scorpions
- Atlanta Wasps
- Boston Minutemen
- Carolina Cobras
- Chicago Beasts
- Dallas Gunfighters
- Detroit Firebirds
- Denver Cougars
- Las Vegas Rollers
- Los Angeles Legends
- Miami Cyclones
- Milwaukee Indians
- Minneapolis Werewolves
- New Jersey Assassins
- New York Knights
- Ohio Red Dogs
- Philadelphia Americans
- Pittsburgh Iron Men
- San Francisco Sharks
- Seattle Sailors
- St. Louis Rhinos
- Tampa Bay Top Guns
- Texas Rustlers
- Washington Federals

== Reception ==
Reception

Aggregate score
Aggregator	Score	
Aggregator	PS3	Xbox 360
Metacritic	73/100	75/100

Review scores
Publication	Score	
Publication	PS3	Xbox 360
Electronic Gaming Monthly	6.67/10	6.67/10
Game Informer	8/10	8/10
GamePro	N/A	4/5
GameSpot	7.5/10	7.5/10
GameSpy	3.5/5	3.5/5
GameTrailers	7.1/10	7.1/10
GameZone	7.5/10	N/A
IGN	7.6/10	7.6/10
Official Xbox Magazine (US)	N/A	8/10
PlayStation: The Official Magazine	8/10	N/A
411Mania	N/A	8/10

The Xbox 360 version received "generally favorable reviews", while the PlayStation 3 version received "average" reviews, according to the review aggregation website Metacritic. The gameplay of APF2K8 is considered better to the game play of Visual Concepts' previous title, ESPN NFL 2K5. However, All-Pro Football 2K8 received criticism for the lack of a multi-season Franchise Mode, as seen in competing titles such as Madden NFL 08 and NCAA Football 08, given ESPN NFL 2K5 contained a similar Franchise Mode. 2K Sports and Visual Concepts chose to omit a franchise mode because since the game revolves around the use of legends from different eras, they felt there would be no rational way for the legends to develop or age.

=== O. J. Simpson controversy ===
In a court ruling, O. J. Simpson was ordered to pay the family of Ronald Goldman any money made for his appearance in the game. Simpson was found not guilty of murdering his ex-wife Nicole Brown Simpson and Goldman in 1995, but was found legally responsible for their deaths by a civil court jury two years later. During pre-production of the game, Simpson was a member of the in-game team called the New Jersey Assassins. Players on the team perform a throat slash as a touchdown celebration, and the animatronic mascot for the Assassins will make a slashing motion. Some pre-release videos showed Simpson performing these moves, implying to some that the designers were intentionally referencing the murders. However, in the retail version of the game, Simpson was moved to the Cyclones.

== See also ==
- Blitz: The League
- Madden NFL 08
- ESPN NFL 2K5
- NCAA Football 14
