= Metro3D =

American video game developer and publisher

Metro3D, Inc.
- Type: Private
- Industry: Video games
- Founded: 1998
- Defunct: 2004
- Fate: Closed
- Headquarters: San Jose, California,
- Key people: Stephen C. H. Lin (CEO)
- Website: metro3d.com (archived)

Metro3D, Inc. was an American video game developer and publisher. Based in San Jose, California, and founded in 1998, the company released several games for the Dreamcast, Game Boy Color (GBC), Game Boy Advance (GBA), and PlayStation 2 (PS2) and Xbox consoles.

== History ==
The formation of Metro3D was announced in April 1999, headed by the ex-Capcom employees Joe Morici and George Nakayama, after signing an agreement with Nintendo of America to become a third-party developer for Nintendo 64 and GBC games.

The company's CEO, Dr. Stephen C. H. Lin, and the U.S. branch of the company filed Chapter 11 bankruptcy on April 19, 2004, after defaulting on a series of loans from Cathay Bank totaling $6.5 million. In June 2005, the European branch was sold off to Stewart Green of Green Solutions Limited (the parent of Data Design Interactive), who reestablished the publisher as Metro3D Europe Ltd. In July 2005, Metro3D Europe announced that they had secured a deal with Data Design Interactive to publish their budget titles for the PlayStation 2 and Microsoft Windows. The company continued releasing titles throughout the year and into 2006. By 2007, Green Solutions folded Metro3D into Data Design Interactive.

== Games ==
- Aero the Acro-Bat (GBA, 2002)
- Aero the Acro-Bat 2 (GBA, unpublished)
- Armada (Dreamcast, 1999)
- Armada II (Dreamcast, Xbox, PS2, unpublished)
- Armada F/X Racers (GBC, 2000)
- Armored Core 2: Another Age (PS2, 2002) (European distribution only)
- Armored Core 3 (PS2, 2003) (European distribution only)
- Chase H.Q.: Secret Police (GBC, 1999)
- Classic Bubble Bobble (GBC, 1999)
- The Cage (GBC, unpublished)
- Dark Angel: Vampire Apocalypse (PS2, 2001)
- Dark Angel II (PS2, unpublished)
- Dark Angel: Anna's Quest (GBC, unpublished)
- Defender of the Crown (GBA, 2002)
- Dinosaur Hunting (released in Japan, unpublished in North America by Metro3D)
- DroneZ (Xbox, 2004, released in Japan as Dennou Taisen ~ DroneZ ~, unpublished in North America by Metro3D)
- Dual Blades (GBA, 2002)
- Gem Smashers (GBA, 2003)
- Maxxis Ultimate ATV (Xbox, unpublished)
- Pumpkin Man (Xbox, unpublished)
- Puzzle Master (GBC, 1999)
- Ninja (GBC, unpublished)
- Shayde: Monsters vs. Humans (Xbox, unpublished)
- Smash Cars (PS2, 2003)
- Stake: Fortune Fighters (Xbox, 2003)
- Sub Rebellion (PS2, 2002)
- The Three Stooges (GBA, 2002)
- Threat Con Delta (PS2, 2004, released in Japan as Kyoushuu Kidou Butai: Kougeki Helicopter Senki, unpublished in North America by Metro3D)
- Urban Extreme (PS2, 2006)
- Wings (GBA, 2003)
- King's Field IV (PS2, 2003) (European distribution only)
- Zero the Kamikaze Squirrel (GBA, unpublished)
