= ESPN NFL Football =

2003 video game

- North American cover art, featuring Warren Sapp
- Developer: Visual Concepts
- Publisher: Sega
- Series: NFL 2K
- Platforms: PlayStation 2, Xbox
- Release: NA: September 2, 2003; AU: November 27, 2003; EU: November 28, 2003
- Genre: Sports (American football)
- Modes: Single-player, multiplayer

ESPN NFL Football (alternatively known as NFL 2K4) is a 2003 American football video game developed by Visual Concepts and published by Sega for the PlayStation 2 and Xbox. It is the fifth installment of Sega's NFL 2K series, although it does not use "2K" in the title and uses the name of sports cable network ESPN. The game was followed by ESPN NFL 2K5 in 2004.

In line with other online-enabled games on the Xbox, multiplayer on Xbox Live was available to players until April 15, 2010. However, online play for ESPN NFL Football has since been restored on the replacement Xbox Live servers called Insignia.

== Reception ==
Reception

Aggregate score
Aggregator	Score	
Aggregator	PS2	Xbox
Metacritic	91/100	91/100

Review scores
Publication	Score	
Publication	PS2	Xbox
Electronic Gaming Monthly	8/10	N/A
Game Informer	9.25/10	9.25/10
GamePro	5/5	5/5
GameRevolution	B+	B+
GameSpot	9.3/10	9.3/10
GameSpy	4/5	4/5
GameZone	9.4/10	9.2/10
IGN	9.3/10	9.3/10
Official U.S. PlayStation Magazine	4.5/5	N/A
Official Xbox Magazine (US)	N/A	9.3/10
BBC Sport	87%	N/A
The Cincinnati Enquirer	4/5	4/5

The game received "universal acclaim" on both platforms according to the review aggregation website Metacritic. GameSpot named it the best Xbox game of September 2003.
