= ESPN NFL 2K5 =

2004 video game

- Cover art featuring Terrell Owens
- Developer: Visual Concepts
- Publishers: Sega of America; Global Star Software (PAL regions)
- Series: NFL 2K
- Platforms: PlayStation 2, Xbox (Note: Backwards compatibility is available on Xbox 360)
- Release: NA: July 20, 2004; EU: February 4, 2005
- Genres: Sports (American football)
- Modes: Single-player, multiplayer

ESPN NFL 2K5 is a 2004 American football video game developed by Visual Concepts and published by Global Star Software and Sega for the PlayStation 2 and Xbox. It is the sixth installment of Sega's NFL 2K series, and the last to use official National Football League licensing. Gameplay is presented as a live ESPN television broadcast and features the voices and digital likenesses of multiple ESPN on-air personalities.

The game was originally released on July 20, 2004. It was the last NFL 2K game to be released before Electronic Arts (EA) signed an exclusive rights agreement with the NFL to make 2K's rival Madden NFL series the only officially licensed NFL game. It was also the last game still being developed by Sega at the time.

ESPN NFL 2K5 received universal critical acclaim, with most critics praising the VIP system and the incorporation of the ESPN broadcast mechanics. It earned numerous end-of-year accolades and honors, and was nominated for several more. It has continued to earn praise retrospectively and is widely considered one of the greatest American football video games ever made.

== Gameplay ==
The game features a franchise mode with a SportsCenter feature hosted by Chris Berman. He outlines the games of the current week with his co-host Trey Wingo who talks about the latest injuries and free agent deals and trades during the season. Mel Kiper Jr. hosts the draft portion of the segment, while Suzy Kolber reports from the sidelines. There is also weekly preparation for the coming week, which allows the player to make decisions on training and preparation. The player can also create their own team, deciding the team logos (over 10 are available), team name, the team's city, the team's stadium look and build, jerseys and how good the team is. It also has a feature called first-person football, which gives the player the experience on the field looking from the eyes of the players. There is also the traditional create-a-player mode.

One of the features in the game is a celebrity game involving Jamie Kennedy, Steve-O, David Arquette, Funkmaster Flex, or Carmen Electra which is initiated by a phone call from one of the aforementioned "celebrities" in the player's custom crib. The player plays against a celebrity with their own custom team of Pro Bowl players. The teams the celebrities use are The Buartville Funkmasters, Cincinnati Electra Shock, LA Dreamteam, Los Angeles Locos, and the Upper Darby Cheesesteaks. During the game, the celebrities appear in a small box and use trash-talk. If the player wins the game, they receive the team's stadium as a playable venue.

ESPN NFL 2K5 features the voices of Terry McGovern as play-by-play announcer Dan Stevens, Jay Styne as color commentator Peter O'Keefe, sideline reporter Suzy Kolber, studio host Chris Berman, Trey Wingo, and Mel Kiper Jr., with Berman appearing at the start of a player's own SportsCenter broadcast and during the loading screen for the player's own ESPN NFL Countdown pregame show, and Kolber appearing in the Player of the Game segment of the postgame show.

== Release ==
In what Grantland later described as "one of the greatest, most insidious guerrilla-warfare moves in the history of video game competition", ESPN NFL 2K5 was priced at $19.99 the day it shipped, much lower than the market leader Madden NFL at $49.99. This greatly reduced Madden sales that year; one EA Sports developer recalled that "[i]t scared the hell out of us". This led EA to reduce Madden NFL 2005's price to $29.95.

== Reception ==
Reception

Aggregate score
Aggregator	Score	
Aggregator	PS2	Xbox
Metacritic	90/100	92/100

Review scores
Publication	Score	
Publication	PS2	Xbox
Electronic Gaming Monthly	8.33/10	8.33/10
Game Informer	9.5/10	9.5/10
GamePro	5/5	5/5
GameRevolution	B+	B+
GameSpot	9.1/10	9.2/10
GameSpy	4.5/5	4.5/5
GameZone	9.3/10	9.5/10
IGN	9.3/10	9.4/10
Official U.S. PlayStation Magazine	4/5	N/A
Official Xbox Magazine (US)	N/A	9.3/10
Maxim	5/5	5/5

Upon release, ESPN NFL 2K5 received "universal acclaim" on both platforms according to the review aggregation website Metacritic. Matthew Kato of Game Informer rated the game 9.5 out of 10 and summarized his positive review by calling it "the best football title there is and the only one that's a must have", a quote which was paraphrased on the front cover of the game's keep case. Andrew Reiner echoed this sentiment in the review's "Second Opinion" section, calling ESPN NFL 2K5 "the greatest football game to date." Chris Carle of IGN gave the PlayStation 2 and Xbox versions a 9.3 and 9.4 out of 10 respectively, and each version was awarded the publication's "Editor's Choice". Carle praised the game's various features, particularly the VIP system, which he called, "Probably the coolest innovation ESPN NFL 2K5 has to offer." Bro Buzz of GamePro gave the game a perfect 5 out of 5, praising the incorporation of ESPN broadcast styles within the game and noting that "the tight controls do a great job of commanding a slick array of player moves and on-the-fly scheme adjustments."

Many reviews compared ESPN NFL 2K5 to Madden NFL 2005, which was released in the same year. In a direct comparison of the two games, Electronic Gaming Monthly declared Madden to be the better game, with scores of 9.5, 9.0, and 9.0, while NFL 2K5 was given scores of 8.5, 8.5, and 8.0. Alex Navarro of GameSpot recommended NFL 2K5, noting superior offensive gameplay, special teams, online play, features, presentation, graphics, and sound. Jon Robinson of IGN agreed that the graphics and presentation of NFL 2K5 were superior to Madden, yet he felt Madden was the better game due to the superior gameplay. Kato opened his review by claiming, "ESPN NFL 2K5 is better than Madden NFL 2005. I say this without reservation", while Buzz stated, "Each season, Sega's ESPN NFL series has been making steady progress in its quest for video-game football stardom. This year, the design guys at Visual Concepts have turned ESPN NFL 2K5 into the most entertaining show in video-game football."

=== Sales ===
In the United States, the PlayStation 2 release of ESPN NFL 2K5 had sold 1.7 million copies and generated $33 million in revenue by July 2006, two years after its release. During the same time period, sales of NFL 2K5 reached 3 million combined units across all consoles, and it was the 23rd highest-selling game launched for either the PlayStation 2, Xbox, or GameCube.

=== Awards ===
ESPN NFL 2K5 won multiple awards for the best sports game of 2004. During the AIAS' 8th Annual Interactive Achievement Awards (now known as the D.I.C.E. Awards), ESPN NFL 2K5 won in the category of "Console Sports Simulation Game of the Year". At E3 2004, it won the Best Sports Game award from GameSpot, and in IGN's year-end awards, it won Best Sports Game released for the Xbox. Upon release, ESPN NFL 2K5 won GameSpot's Xbox Game of the Month and PlayStation 2 Game of the Month awards, and the publication later named it the year's "Best Traditional Sports Game" and "Best Budget Game" across all platforms. It was also nominated for Best Sports Game across all video game systems by IGN and the Spike Video Game Awards, losing in both to Madden NFL 2005. In the Satellite Awards, given annually by the International Press Academy, it was the only NFL simulation game nominated for Outstanding Sports Game, although NFL Street, a football game that does not simulate NFL gameplay, was also nominated.

Since its release, numerous websites and publications have ranked ESPN NFL 2K5 as one of the greatest sports video games of all time, listed as 44th by Bleacher Report in 2011. In his "Sports Video Game Rankings" compiled for ESPN, Robinson ranked the game 8th, two spots higher than Madden NFL 2005 despite Robinson's preference for Madden in his contemporary review. Yardbarker included NFL 2K5 in an unordered list of the 25 best sports games of all time, noting that, "For a brief moment, there was a true challenger to the Madden hegemony. ESPN NFL 2K5 had a different look and a slightly different game play, and people loved it." Time ranked NFL 2K5 as the 41st greatest video game of all-time regardless of genre, stating, "Sorry, Madden NFL fans, true football gaming fanatics know this is the best gridiron game ever made."

== Legacy ==
In retrospective analyses, ESPN NFL 2K5 has continued to receive favorable comparisons to the Madden NFL series and is noted for its depth that has yet to be matched in subsequent years. In 2014, Owen S. Good of Polygon wrote that NFL 2K5 was "sports video gaming's King Arthur, eternally populist, noble and heroic, champion of an age long ago enough to make its triumphs soar and its shortcomings recede to nothingness." Good went on to state that EA's Madden developers "for 10 years have been haunted by NFL 2K5 — in forums, in comments, in social media — that nothing they do could be as good as something that by now really isn't a video game, but a mythological ideal that grows more romantic with every year". A 2016 Game Informer retrospective by Matthew Kato praised the variety of features in the game, which was noted as "a far cry from the stark decline that followed in EA's NFL titles." Kato concluded by stating, "The title is more than just a novelty or a case of its reputation exceeding its value, a rare feat for the genre in my eyes." The game has very often been considered by critics to be one of the greatest video games ever made.

=== EA exclusive licensing controversy ===
In December 2004, EA Sports acquired an exclusive rights agreement with the NFL and NFLPA to be the sole creator of NFL video games.

In December 2010, a U.S. district court judge certified a class action anti-trust lawsuit against Electronic Arts for anti-competitive practices to proceed. Electronic Arts settled the class action suit in July 2012 for $27 million (equivalent to $37.86 million in 2025), and retained its exclusive NFL license.
