= NFL 2K2 =

2001 video game

- North American cover art, featuring Randy Moss
- Developer: Visual Concepts
- Publisher: Sega (Note: Released under the Sega Sports banner)
- Series: NFL 2K
- Platforms: Dreamcast, PlayStation 2, Xbox
- Release: Dreamcast: NA: September 18, 2001; PlayStation 2: NA: November 20, 2001; Xbox: NA: January 9, 2002
- Genre: Sports (American football)
- Modes: Single-player, multiplayer

NFL 2K2 is a 2001 American football video game developed by Visual Concepts and published by Sega for the Dreamcast. It is the third installment of Sega's NFL 2K series, as well as the last in the series to be released for the Dreamcast, which had been discontinued by the time of the game's release. The game was later re-released for PlayStation 2 and Xbox, being the first game to be released by Sega for the latter console.

The game and the rest of the 2K titles on the Dreamcast have had their online capabilities revived and are completely playable online.

== Reception ==
Reception

Aggregate score
Aggregator	Score		
Aggregator	Dreamcast	PS2	Xbox
Metacritic	90/100	85/100	87/100

Review scores
Publication	Score		
Publication	Dreamcast	PS2	Xbox
AllGame	N/A	4/5	4/5
Electronic Gaming Monthly	7.83/10 (Note: Three critics of Electronic Gaming Monthly gave the Dreamcast version each a score of 8.5/10, 7/10, and 8/10.)	8.17/10 (Note: Two critics of Electronic Gaming Monthly gave the PlayStation 2 version each a score of 8/10, and the other gave it 8.5/10.)	8.83/10 (Note: In Electronic Gaming Monthly's review of the Xbox version, one critic gave it 8.5/10, and the rest gave it each a score of 9/10.)
EP Daily	8.5/10	N/A	N/A
Famitsu	29/40	32/40	N/A
Game Informer	9/10	9.5/10	9.25/10
GameRevolution	N/A	A−	N/A
GameSpot	9.5/10	9.5/10	9.3/10
GameSpy	9/10	78%	82%
GameZone	N/A	N/A	7/10
IGN	9/10	9/10	8.3/10
Next Generation	4/5	N/A	N/A
Official U.S. PlayStation Magazine	N/A	3.5/5	N/A
Official Xbox Magazine (US)	N/A	N/A	8.8/10

The Dreamcast version received "universal acclaim", while the PlayStation 2 and Xbox versions received "generally favorable reviews", according to the review aggregation website Metacritic. Gary Whitta of NextGen said of the Dreamcast version, "It's showing its age, but NFL2K2 can still compete with anything the next generation has to offer." In Japan, where the Dreamcast and PS2 versions were ported for release on March 28, 2002, Famitsu gave it a score of 29 out of 40 for the former, and 32 out of 40 for the latter.

Dr. Zombie of GamePro's December 2001 issue said that the Dreamcast version "continues its dominance as a high quality alternative to the Madden NFL series. Although the game wins by default for the Dreamcast, NFL 2K2's game enhancements and updated rosters make this a must-but for Dreamcast football gamers." (Note: GamePro gave the Dreamcast version 5/5 each for graphics, sound, control, and fun factor.) Two issues later, Bro Buzz said of the PlayStation 2 version, "Despite a few weak spots on its roster, NFL 2K2 is a whole lotta fun! Madden NFL 2002, out and about since last August, probably caught the lion's share of football gamers this season. But if you're ready for a second season, NFL 2K2 is more than worthy. And, as just the first PS2 football game from Sega Sports, you gotta like its chances next season." (Note: GamePro gave the PlayStation 2 version 4/5 each for graphics, sound, control, and fun factor.) Another issue later, he said of the Xbox version, "It's basically a port of the PS2 version, but on the Xbox, its graphics are so much sharper and the joystick-dependent interface feels perfect." (Note: GamePro gave the Xbox version two 5/5 scores for graphics and fun factor, and two 4.5/5 scores for sound and control.)

The Dreamcast version was nominated for the "Best Sports, Traditional Game" and "Best Dreamcast Game" awards at GameSpot's Best and Worst of 2001 Awards, both of which went to NBA 2K2 and Phantasy Star Online, respectively. The same console version won the award for "Dreamcast Game of the Year" (which it shared with NBA 2K2) at The Electric Playground's 2001 Blister Awards, and was also nominated for the "Best Multiplayer Console Game" (along with said game), but lost to Halo: Combat Evolved.
