= Index of Windows games (H) =

This is an index of Microsoft Windows games.

This list has been split into multiple pages. Please use the Table of Contents to browse it.

Title	Released	Developer	Publisher
Haegemonia: Legions of Iron	2002	Digital Reality	DreamCatcher Games, Wanadoo
Halo 2	2007	Bungie	Microsoft Game Studios
Halo Infinite	2021	343 Industries	Microsoft Game Studios
Halo: Combat Evolved	2003	Bungie, Gearbox Software	Microsoft Game Studios
Halo: The Master Chief Collection	2019	343 Industries	Xbox Game Studios
Happy Feet	2006	Artificial Mind and Movement	Midway Games
Happy Tree Friends: False Alarm	2008	Stainless Games	Sega
Hard Reset	2011	Flying Wild Hog	Flying Wild Hog
Hard Truck: 18 Wheels of Steel	2002	SCS Software	ValuSoft
Hard Truck 2	2000	SoftLab-Nsk	ValuSoft
Hard Truck Apocalypse	2005	Targem Games	CDV Software
Hardcore 4X4	1997	Gremlin Interactive	ASC Games
Hardlife	1997	Cryo Interactive	Virgin Interactive
Hardspace: Shipbreaker	2022	Blackbird Interactive	Focus Entertainment
The Hardy Boys: The Hidden Theft	2008	JoWooD	The Adventure Company
Harry Potter and the Chamber of Secrets	2002	KnowWonder	Electronic Arts
Harry Potter and the Goblet of Fire	2005	EA UK	Electronic Arts
Harry Potter and the Half-Blood Prince	2009	EA Bright Light Studio	Electronic Arts
Harry Potter and the Order of the Phoenix	2007	EA UK	Electronic Arts
Harry Potter and the Philosopher's Stone	2001	KnowWonder	Electronic Arts
Harry Potter the Prisoner of Azkaban	2004	KnowWonder	Electronic Arts
Harry Potter: Quidditch World Cup	2003	EA UK	Electronic Arts
Haru no Ashioto	2004	Alchemist	Minori
Haruiro Ouse	2008	Purple Software	Purple Software
Harukanaru Toki no Naka de 2	2001	Ruby Party	Koei
Harvest: Massive Encounter	2008	Oxeye Game Studio	Oxeye Game Studio
Heart of Darkness	1998	Amazing Studio	Interplay Entertainment
Hearthstone	2014	Blizzard Entertainment	Blizzard Entertainment
Hearts of Iron	2002	Paradox Development Studio	Strategy First, Atari SA
Hearts of Iron II	2005	Paradox Development Studio	Paradox Interactive
Hearts of Iron III	2009	Paradox Development Studio	Paradox Interactive
Hearts of Iron IV	2016	Paradox Development Studio	Paradox Interactive
Heat Project	2005	DOOBIC Entertainment	ParanGAME, Gamania, Asia Eastern
Heavy Rain	2019	Quantic Dream	Quantic Dream
Heavy Weapon	2005	PopCap Games	PopCap Games
Heiankyo Alien	1999	Hyperware	Hyperware
The Hell in Vietnam	2007	DTP Entertainment	City Interactive
Hellbender	1996	Terminal Reality	Microsoft
Hellblade: Senua's Sacrifice	2017	Ninja Theory	Ninja Theory
Hellboy: Dogs of the Night	2000	Cryo Studios North America	Cryo Studios North America
Hellgate: London	2007	Flagship Studios	Namco, EA Games, HanbitSoft
Hello Kitty Online	2009	Sanrio Digital, Typhoon Games	Level Up! Games, GOGAME, Aeria Games, Burda:ic, gloot.net, GameMaxx
Hello Kitty: Roller Rescue	2005	XPEC Entertainment	Namco, Empire Interactive
Hellpoint	2020	Cradle Games	TinyBuild
Hercules	1997	Disney Interactive Software	Disney Interactive Software
Heretic II	1998	Raven Software	Activision
Hero Online	2006	Netgame	Mgame USA Inc.
Heroes of Annihilated Empires	2006	GSC Game World	GSC World Publishing
Heroes of Might and Magic	1996	New World Computing	New World Computing
Heroes of Might and Magic II	1996	New World Computing	3DO
Heroes of Might and Magic III	1999	New World Computing	3DO
Heroes of Might and Magic III: Armageddon's Blade	1999	New World Computing	3DO
Heroes of Might and Magic III: The Shadow of Death	2000	New World Computing	3DO
Heroes of Might and Magic IV	2002	New World Computing	3DO
Heroes of Might and Magic V	2006	Nival Interactive	Ubisoft
Heroes of Might and Magic V: Hammers of Fate	2006	Nival Interactive	Ubisoft
Heroes of Might and Magic V: Tribes of the East	2007	Nival Interactive	Ubisoft
Heroes of the Pacific	2005	Transmission Games	Codemasters
Heroes of the Storm	2015	Blizzard Entertainment	Blizzard Entertainment
Heroes Over Europe	2009	Transmission Games	Ubisoft
Hexen: Beyond Heretic	1997	Raven Software	id Software
Hexen: Deathkings of the Dark Citadel	1997	Raven Software	id Software
Hexen II	1997	Raven Software	Empire Interactive Entertainment
Hexplore	1998	Doki Denki Studio	Infogrames
Hidden & Dangerous	1999	Illusion Softworks	Take-Two Interactive, TalonSoft, Global Star Software, Gathering of Developers
Hidden & Dangerous 2	2003	Illusion Softworks	Gathering of Developers
Hidden Star in Four Seasons	2017	Team Shanghai Alice	Team Shanghai Alice
High Heat Baseball 1999	1998	Team .366	The 3DO Company
High Heat Baseball 2000	1999	Team .366	The 3DO Company
High Heat Major League Baseball 2002	2001	3DO	3DO
High Heat Major League Baseball 2003	2002	3DO	3DO
High Heat Major League Baseball 2004	2003	3DO	3DO
High School Musical 3: Senior Year Dance	2008	Page 44 Studios	Disney Interactive
Higurashi Daybreak	2006	Twilight Frontier	Twilight Frontier
Hind	1996	Digital Integration Ltd.	Digital Integration Ltd., Interactive Magic
Hinterland	2008	Tilted Mill Entertainment	Tilted Mill Entertainment
Hired Guns: The Jagged Edge	2007	GFI Russia	GFI / Russobit-M
The History Channel: Civil War - A Nation Divided	2006	Cauldron HQ	Activision Value
The History Channel: Great Battles of Rome	2007	Slitherine Software	Black Bean Games
History Civil War: Secret Missions	2008	Cauldron Ltd	Activision Value
History: Egypt – Engineering an Empire	2010	Slitherine Software	Slitherine Software
Hitman 2: Silent Assassin	2002	IO Interactive	Eidos Interactive
Hitman: Blood Money	2006	IO Interactive	Eidos Interactive
Hitman: Codename 47	2000	IO Interactive	Eidos Interactive
Hitman: Contracts	2004	IO Interactive	Eidos Interactive
The Hive	1995	Rainbow America	Trimark Interactive
The Hobbit	2003	Inevitable Entertainment	Vivendi Universal
Hogs of War	2000	Infogrames	Infogrames
Hollow Knight	2017	Team Cherry	Team Cherry
Home Safety Hotline	2024	Night Signal Entertainment	Night Signal Entertainment
Home Sweet Home	2007	Big Blue Bubble	Big Blue Bubble
Home Sweet Home	2017	Yggdrazil Group	Yggdrazil Group
Homefront	2010	Kaos Studios	THQ
Homefront: The Revolution	2016	Dambuster Studios, Crytek	Deep Silver
Homeworld	1999	Relic Entertainment	Sierra Entertainment
Homeworld 2	2003	Relic Entertainment	Sierra Entertainment
Homeworld 3	2024	Blackbird Interactive	Gearbox Publishing
Homeworld: Cataclysm	2000	Barking Dog Studios	Sierra Entertainment
Homeworld: Deserts of Kharak	2016	Blackbird Interactive	Gearbox Publishing
Homura Hime	2026	Crimson Dusk	Playism
Hooligans: Storm Over Europe	2002	Darxabre	Darxabre, Hip Games
Hooters Road Trip	2002	Hoplite Research	Ubi Soft
Hopeless Masquerade	2013	Twilight Frontier, Team Shanghai Alice	Twilight Frontier, Team Shanghai Alice
Hopkins FBI	1998	MP Entertainment	MP Entertainment
Horizon Zero Dawn	2020	Guerrilla Games, Virtuos	Sony Interactive Entertainment
Horses	2025	Santa Ragione Game Studio	Santa Ragione Game Studio
Horsez	2006	MTO	Ubisoft
Hospital Tycoon	2007	DR Studios	Codemasters
Hostile Waters: Antaeus Rising	2001	Rage Games Limited	Rage Games Limited
Hot Wheels Micro Racers	2000	Unique Development Studios	Mattel Interactive
Hot Wheels Stunt Track Driver	1998	Mattel	THQ
Hot Wheels: Velocity X	2002	Beyond Games	THQ
Hot Wheels: World Race	2003	Climax Group	THQ
Hot Wheels: Beat That!	2007	Aspyr Media	Activision
Hot Wheels: Stunt Track Challenge	2004	Climax Group	THQ
Hour of Victory	2007	N-Fusion Interactive	Midway Games
Hourglass of Summer	2002	Princess Soft	Princess Soft
House Flipper	2018	Empyrean	Frozen District, PlayWay
House Flipper 2	2023	Empyrean, Frozen District	Frozen District, PlayWay
The House of the Dead	1998	Wow Entertainment	Sega
The House of the Dead 2	1999	Wow Entertainment	Sega
The House of the Dead III	2002	Wow Entertainment	Sega
House of the Dying Sun	2016	Marauder Interactive	Marauder Interactive
House Party	2022	Eek! Games, LLC	Eek! Games, LLC
Hover!	1995	Microsoft	Microsoft
Hover Bovver	2002	Idigicon Limited	Idigicon Limited
How to Survive	2013	Eko Software	505 Games
Hoyle Card Games	1999	Sierra On-Line	Sierra On-Line
Hoyle Casino	2000	Sierra On-Line	Sierra On-Line
Hoyle Casino Empire	2002	Sierra Entertainment	Sierra Entertainment
Hoyle Majestic Chess	2003	Fluent Entertainment	Sierra Entertainment
Hugo II, Whodunit?	1995	Gray Design Associates	Gray Design Associates
Hugo III, Jungle of Doom!	1995	Gray Design Associates	Gray Design Associates
Hugo's House of Horrors	1995	Gray Design Associates	Gray Design Associates
Hulk	2003	Radical Entertainment	Vivendi Games
Human: Fall Flat	2016	No Brakes Games	Curve Digital
Hunt: Showdown	2019	Crytek	Crytek
Hunted: The Demon's Forge	2011	InXile Entertainment	Bethesda Softworks
Hydrophobia	2011	Dark Energy Digital	Dark Energy Digital
Hype: The Time Quest	1999	Playmobil Interactive	Ubi Soft
Hyperball Racing	2006	Gabitasoft Entertainment	Gabitasoft Entertainment
HyperBlade	1996	Wizbang! Software Productions	Activision
Hypercharge: Unboxed	2020	Digital Cybercherries	Digital Cybercherries
Hysteria Hospital: Emergency Ward	2009	Game Invest	Oxygen Games
