= Home Sweet Home Rebirth =

2025 supernatural horror film

- Release poster
- Directed by: Alex & Steffen
- Based on: Home Sweet Home by Yggdrazil Group Co., Ltd
- Produced by: Dean Altit; Pakin Maliwan
- Starring: William Moseley; Michele Morrone; Urassaya Sperbund; Alexander Lee
- Cinematography: Maher Maleh
- Edited by: Sebastian Wild
- Music by: Tao Liu
- Production companies: Altit Media Group; Yggdrazil Group; 20th Century Studios; Film Frame Productions
- Distributed by: Vertical
- Release date: April 11, 2025
- Running time: 93 minutes
- Countries: United States; Thailand
- Languages: English; Thai
- Box office: $235,442

Home Sweet Home Rebirth is a 2025 supernatural horror film, based on the 2017 Thai video game Home Sweet Home developed and published by Yggdrazil Group. Directed by Alex & Steffen, the film stars William Moseley, Michele Morrone, Urassaya Sperbund and Alexander Lee. It was released by Vertical in the United States on April 11, 2025.

== Plot ==
Jake (William Moseley), a dedicated police officer, embarks on a family vacation to Bangkok with his wife, Prang (Urassaya Sperbund), and their young daughter, Loo. Despite being on vacation, Jake remains engrossed in work, causing tension with Prang. Their trip takes a horrifying turn when a mass shooting erupts at a shopping mall. Jake confronts the shooter, Mek (Michele Morrone), who cryptically refers to Jake as “the Keeper” before triggering an explosion that kills them both.

Jake awakens in "The Hindrance," a purgatorial realm between life and death. Here, he encounters Chan (Alexander Lee), a novice monk who reveals that Jake's death was part of a ritual to open the Gates of Hell. Chan explains that Jake is the prophesied "Keeper," destined to prevent the apocalypse. Meanwhile, Prang and Loo navigate a city overrun by possessed individuals. They seek refuge in a hotel, unaware that Mek, now possessing Jake's body, is pursuing them.

Jake returns to the mortal realm by inhabiting another man's body, armed with a sacred flintlock and a Nona metal knife provided by Chan. He confronts Mek, leading to a brutal fight. In the chaos, Prang, mistaking the real Jake for an imposter due to his new appearance, shoots him. Jake is sent back to The Hindrance, where Chan heals him and prepares him for the final confrontation.

Guided by a map left by Mek, Jake and Chan locate the Gates of Hell. They discover that Mek plans to sacrifice Loo, whose blood is key to fully opening the gates. In a climactic battle, Jake kills Mek, sending his soul to The Hindrance, where it is destroyed. Prang shoots Wichien, Chan's father and the mastermind behind the ritual, as he attempts to kill Loo. Wichien warns that to close the gates, Jake must enter them himself. Accepting his fate, Jake bids farewell to his family and steps into the infernal portal, sealing it shut.

With the gates closed, Prang and Loo reunite with Prang's mother, believing the nightmare is over. However, a mysterious woman arrives at the site of the sealed gates, suggesting that the battle between good and evil is far from over.

== Cast ==
- Michele Morrone as Mek
- William Moseley as Jake
- Urassaya Sperbund as Prang
- Alexander Lee as Novice Monk

== Production ==
In November 2023, it was announced that a live-action adaptation of the 2017 Thai video game Home Sweet Home was in development, with Alexander Kiesl and Steffen Hacker directing, and Michele Morrone, William Moseley, Urassaya Sperbund and Alexander Lee joining the cast. It is Urassaya's first Hollywood film; principal photography had been completed in Thailand by December 2023.

== Release ==
Home Sweet Home Rebirth released in the United States on April 11, 2025, by Vertical. It earned $235,442 in the box office outside of the US.
