= Tycoon City: New York =

2006 video game

- Developer(s): Deep Red Games
- Publisher(s): Atari
- Platform(s): Microsoft Windows 98/ME/2000/XP/Vista
- Release: NA: February 21, 2006; PAL: February 24, 2006
- Genre(s): City-building game
- Mode(s): Single-player

Tycoon City: New York is a 2006 city-building game that was developed by Deep Red Games and published by Atari. The game first released on February 21, 2006, and players are tasked with developing New York City, specifically the island of Manhattan. Players are asked to build many of the city's most recognizable landmarks such as the Empire State Building, the Chrysler Building, the Statue of Liberty, Rockefeller Center and the United Nations Headquarters.

Tommo purchased the rights to this game and digitally publishes it through its Retroism brand in 2015.

== Gameplay ==
Gameplay can be accomplished through two different modes. In "Build New York" the player is given specific tasks and must build New York district by district, starting with Greenwich Village. The player must complete certain tasks and compete with business rivals in order to unlock other districts for development. In "Sandbox" mode players have full control over the entire island and are able to control the amount of competition, their rate of building, and starting amount of cash.

Regardless of which mode the game is played in, the game starts with an empty district which must be developed. Players choose from different types of buildings, including residential, commercial, and recreational. To add to the realism, several brand names (including Staples and Loews Theatres) can be built. The player must attract customers to raise funds by upgrading their buildings. This can include flowers, extra seating, signs, air conditioners, or water towers. Landmarks can be constructed by earning landmark bonds. Unlike in some other city-building games, the player has no control over the positioning of streets. The focus on individual businesses and their needs reflects that of Deep Red Games' earlier business empire game, Monopoly Tycoon.

Although the World Trade Center is not available in the game, there is a park called Memorial Park where the Twin Towers should be. To represent the Center there are two trees placed were the towers should be. The player cannot buy the park at any time and, therefore, is not allowed to upgrade it.

Districts in the game include:

- Central Park
- Chelsea
- Chinatown
- East Village
- Financial District
- Garment District
- Greenwich Village
- Harlem
- Liberty Island
- Little Italy
- Lower East Side
- Midtown
- Soho
- TriBeCa
- Upper East Side
- Upper West Side

== Reception ==
Critical reception for Tycoon City: New York has been mixed and the game currently holds a rating of 67 on Metacritic, based on 30 reviews.
