= Madden NFL 2002 =

2001 video game

- North American cover art with Daunte Culpepper
- Developers: EA Tiburon; Budcat Creations (PS, N64, GBA); 3d6 Games, GameBrains (GBC)
- Publishers: NA/EU: EA Sports; JP: Electronic Arts Square
- Series: Madden NFL
- Platforms: PlayStation, PlayStation 2, Windows, Game Boy Color, Nintendo 64, Xbox, GameCube, Game Boy Advance
- Release: August 14, 2001: PlayStation; NA: August 14, 2001 PlayStation 2; NA: August 20, 2001; EU: October 12, 2001; JP: January 31, 2002 Windows; NA: August 21, 2001; EU: September 21, 2001 Game Boy Color; NA: September 11, 2001 Nintendo 64; NA: September 13, 2001 Xbox; NA: November 15, 2001 GameCube; NA: November 18, 2001 Game Boy Advance; NA: November 19, 2001
- Genre: Sports (American football)
- Modes: Single-player, multiplayer

Madden NFL 2002 (also known as Madden 2002) is an American football video game. It features former Minnesota Vikings quarterback Daunte Culpepper on the cover. Pat Summerall and John Madden are the commentators. The Madden NFL 2002 commercial first aired during Super Bowl XXXVI, three days after Madden NFL 2002 started selling in Japan. Notably, it does not feature the Super Bowl MVP Tom Brady, who is included on later editions of the game as a roster update. It is also the first game to be developed by Budcat Creations.

== Features ==
Madden NFL 2002 features play now, season, franchise, tournament, create-a-player and create-a-team modes. It also has the Madden Card feature. Along with being a GameCube and Xbox launch title, it was one of the last releases for the Nintendo 64 and Game Boy Color. This is the first Madden game to feature the Houston Texans in the team select (although they did not begin play for another year after the game's debut). It was bundled with NBA Live 2002 and NASCAR Thunder 2002 as part of the EA 2002 collector's edition for the PlayStation. Also the game featured the 2002 Expansion Draft where the player can add the 32nd team into the league, but it will force the Seattle Seahawks to move into the NFC (which will occur in the second season of the 30-season Franchise mode).

The Baltimore Ravens had the best team overall in the game with the score of 99. The worst team in the game belongs to the Houston Texans with the score of 39. The best offense in the game belongs to the St. Louis Rams with the score of 96. The best defense in the game belongs to the Baltimore Ravens with the score of 96. The best special teams in the game belongs to seven different teams (Minnesota Vikings, Tennessee Titans, Baltimore Ravens, Detroit Lions, Indianapolis Colts, San Diego Chargers, and Denver Broncos) all with scores of 99.

Also included as an extra is a slightly modified version of John Madden Football 93 for the Sega Genesis in the PlayStation and Nintendo 64 versions, albeit with an updated roster due to licensing issues.

== Reception ==
The PlayStation 2 and Xbox versions received "universal acclaim", and the Game Boy Advance, GameCube, Nintendo 64 and PlayStation versions received "generally favorable reviews", while the PC version received "mixed or average reviews", according to the review aggregation website Metacritic. NextGen said of the Xbox version in its final issue, "Slightly better than last year's (or even this year's) excellent PS2 version, it's hard to find much fault with this outstanding effort." In Japan, Famitsu gave the PS2 version a score of 33 out of 40.

Kevin "BIFF" Giacobbi of GameZone gave the PC version 9.5 out of 10, saying, "This is probably the most beautiful display of 3-D graphics you will find in any sports game to date. This is of course if your PC has a lot under the hood, especially a good video card." Louis Bedigian gave the Xbox version 9 out of 10, saying, "Control and sound issues aside, this is the best version of Madden 2002 available." He later gave the GameCube version 8.9 out of 10, saying that it was "Harder to control than it should be. I love both the Xbox and GC controllers (a rarity, since most gamers like one, but hate the other), but Madden was not developed for either of them." Kevin Krause gave the PlayStation 2 version the same score of 8.9, calling it "a game that's so feature-rich, so extremely customizable, and so realistic that I'd recommend this one even if you're not a football buff." Michael Lafferty, however, gave the PlayStation version 8 out of 10, saying that it was "Solid graphically and in the audio department." However, William Abner of Computer Games Magazine gave the PC version three stars out of five, saying, "It's better to have not played a game that teases you such as this than to have played it and pulled your hair out in frustration."

Reception

Aggregate scores
Aggregator	Score							
Aggregator	GBA	GBC	GameCube	N64	PC	PS	PS2	Xbox
GameRankings	63%	69%	90%	80%	72%	85%	92%	89%
Metacritic	76/100	N/A	89/100	78/100	71/100	88/100	94/100	90/100

Review scores
Publication	Score							
Publication	GBA	GBC	GameCube	N64	PC	PS	PS2	Xbox
AllGame	4/5	2/5	N/A	N/A	4/5	N/A	N/A	4.5/5
Computer Gaming World	N/A	N/A	N/A	N/A	3.5/5	N/A	N/A	N/A
Electronic Gaming Monthly	N/A	N/A	8.83/10 (Note: Two critics of Electronic Gaming Monthly gave the GameCube version each a score of 9/10, and the other gave it 8.5/10.)	7/10	N/A	7/10	9.33/10 (Note: In Electronic Gaming Monthly's review of the PlayStation 2 version, one critic gave it 9/10, and the rest gave it each a score of 9.5/10.)	9/10
EP Daily	N/A	N/A	N/A	N/A	N/A	N/A	10/10	N/A
Game Informer	N/A	N/A	9/10	N/A	N/A	8/10	9.75/10	9.5/10
GameRevolution	N/A	N/A	N/A	N/A	N/A	B	A−	A−
GameSpot	N/A	N/A	8.6/10	9.1/10	6.7/10	9.3/10	9.2/10	8.6/10
GameSpy	N/A	N/A	(favorable)	N/A	78%	N/A	91%	4/5
IGN	7.8/10	N/A	8.7/10	N/A	7/10	N/A	9.2/10	8.6/10
Next Generation	N/A	N/A	N/A	N/A	N/A	N/A	N/A	5/5
Nintendo Power	N/A	N/A	4.5/5	3.5/5	N/A	N/A	N/A	N/A
Official U.S. PlayStation Magazine	N/A	N/A	N/A	N/A	N/A	4.5/5	4.5/5	N/A
Official Xbox Magazine (US)	N/A	N/A	N/A	N/A	N/A	N/A	N/A	9/10
PC Gamer (US)	N/A	N/A	N/A	N/A	75%	N/A	N/A	N/A
Playboy	N/A	N/A	N/A	N/A	N/A	N/A	90%	N/A

Uncle Dust of GamePro's October 2001 issue said of the Nintendo 64 version, "After last year's impressive debut for Madden on the PS2 and the lack of any must-have additions to the 2002 version, you'd be much better served saving the money you would have spent on this cart and putting it toward a new system to play a truly new game of Madden." (Note: GamePro gave the Nintendo 64 version 3.5/5 for graphics, 3/5 for sound, and two 4/5 scores for control and fun factor.) Jake the Snake said of the PlayStation version, "If you need a new football game as badly as you need a system upgrade, Madden 2002 drills it through the old wooden uprights." (Note: GamePro gave the PlayStation version two 5/5 scores for graphics and fun factor, 4/5 for sound, and 4.5/5 for control.) Atomic Dawg said of the PlayStation 2 version, "Madden football is on a roll, and even in the face of future competition it continues to set the standard for PS2 football fare. It looks like another great season for Madden in 2002." (Note: GamePro gave the PlayStation 2 version 5/5 each for graphics, sound, control, and fun factor.) Two issues later, Bro Buzz said of the Xbox version, "Madden makes the smary play by not fixing anything that ain't broke. If you're making tackles and scoring touchdowns with the PS2 version, there's no incentive to switch right now. But if you're a first-time football gamer looking for a serious simulation or a pro totally committing to the Xbox, you can't go wrong with Madden NFL 2002." (Note: GamePro gave the Xbox version two 5/5 scores for graphics and fun factor, 4/5 for sound, and 4.5/5 for control.)

Glenn Rubenstein of Extended Play gave the PlayStation 2 version all five stars, saying that it was "everything you'd expect from the series, plus a few pleasant surprises. The graphics and gameplay are terrific, and the create-a-team and franchises features are now more complete, allowing you greater control over building your football dynasty. Although it moves fast, it still isn't anywhere close to the more arcade-style football games out there. It remains very much a hands-on simulation of football. Even though the competition has weakened in recent years, the "Madden" series is at the top of its game, and this is close to perfection." He later gave the GameCube version the same perfect score, saying, "Even though there is currently no competition on the GameCube gridiron, Madden NFL 2002 is worth buying. The game offers something for everyone. Younger football fans will appreciate the game's training modes, and more experienced players will enjoy the game's long-term potential. Madden NFL 2002 not only plays an incredibly deep and solid game of football, but it showcases the system's versatility for handling a fast-paced sports simulation. We hope that this is just the beginning of an amazing run for EA Sports on the GameCube."

The PC version sold 310,000 units and earned $9.7 million by August 2006 in the U.S., after its release in August 2001. It was the country's 59th best-selling computer game between January 2000 and August 2006. Combined sales of all Madden NFL computer games released between January 2000 and August 2006 had reached 1.9 million units in the U.S. by the latter date. Madden NFL 2002 sold 4 million units.

The game was a runner-up in GameSpot's annual award categories for the best Xbox game, best Nintendo 64 game, and best traditional sports console game. It was also nominated for the "Console Sports" and "PC Sports" awards at AIAS' 5th Annual Interactive Achievement Awards, both of which went to Tony Hawk's Pro Skater 3 and FIFA Football 2002, respectively. The game won the award for "Best Console Sports Game" at The Electric Playground's 2001 Blister Awards, and was nominated for the "Best Sports Game for PC", "Best Graphics in a Console Game", and "PS2 Game of the Year" awards, but lost to High Heat Major League Baseball 2002, Halo: Combat Evolved, and Grand Theft Auto III, respectively.
