= 5th Annual Interactive Achievement Awards =

Video game award ceremony

- Date: February 28, 2002
- Venue: Hard Rock Hotel and Casino
- Country: Las Vegas, Nevada, USA
- Hosted by: Patton Oswalt

Highlights
- Most awards: Halo: Combat Evolved (4)
- Most nominations: Halo: Combat Evolved; Ico (8)
- Game of the Year: Halo: Combat Evolved
- Hall of Fame: Will Wright

The 5th Annual Interactive Achievement Awards was the 5th edition of the Interactive Achievement Awards, an annual awards event that honored the best games in the video game industry during 2001. The awards were arranged by the Academy of Interactive Arts & Sciences (AIAS), and were held at the Hard Rock Hotel and Casino in Las Vegas, Nevada on February 28, 2002. It was also held as part of the Academy's first annual D.I.C.E. Summit. It was hosted by stand-up comedian Patton Oswalt, and featured presenters included Cliff Bleszinski, Richard Garriott, Richard Hilleman, Don James, American McGee, Lorne Lanning, Sid Meier, Shigeru Miyamoto, Ray Muzyka, Natalie Raitano, Lucia Rijker, Jason Rubin, Jez San, George Sanger, and Steve Schirripa.

The award for "Hand-Held Game of the Year" was introduced this year as a console award. The console and computer awards for "Family Title of the Year" had been renamed as "Children's Title of the Year". This would be the final year the award for "PC Educational Title of the Year" would be offered. This was the first year nominees were limited to just one genre award for either console/PC.

Halo: Combat Evolved won the most awards, including "Game of the Year", and was tied with Ico for having the most nominations. Electronic Arts received the most nominations and published the most nominated games. Microsoft Game Studios had won the most awards and tied with Nintendo for having the most award-winning games. Baldur's Gate won both console and PC awards for "Role-Playing Game of the Year", with Baldur's Gate: Dark Alliance for console and the Baldur's Gate II: Throne of Bhaal expansion for PC.

Will Wright, the creator of SimCity and The Sims, was inducted into the Academy of Interactive Arts & Sciences Hall of Fame.

== Winners and Nominees ==
Winners are listed first, highlighted in boldface, and indicated with a double dagger (‡).

**Game of the Year**
- **Halo: Combat Evolved** — **Bungie**, **Microsoft Game Studios**‡
  - Black & White — Lionhead Studios, Electronic Arts
  - Ico — SCE Japan Studio
  - Sid Meier's Civilization III — Firaxis Games, Infogrames

=== Craft Awards ===
**Outstanding Achievement in Game Design**: **Grand Theft Auto III** — **DMA Design**, **Rockstar Games**‡; Dark Age of Camelot — Mythic Entertainment, Vivendi Universal Games; Halo: Combat Evolved — Bungie, Microsoft Game Studios; Ico — SCE Japan Studio; Jak & Daxter: The Precursor Legacy — Naughty Dog, Sony Computer Entertainment; Pikmin — Nintendo EAD	**Outstanding Achievement in Character or Story Development**: **Ico** — **SCE Japan Studio**‡; Black & White — Lionhead Studios, Electronic Arts; Conker's Bad Fur Day — Rare; Metal Gear Solid 2: Sons of Liberty — Konami; Myst III: Exile — Presto Studios, Ubisoft
**Outstanding Achievement in Animation**: **Oddworld: Munch's Oddysee** — **Oddworld Inhabitants**, **Microsoft Game Studios**‡; Black & White — Lionhead Studios, Electronic Arts; Dead or Alive 3 — Team Ninja, Tecmo; Super Smash Bros. Melee — HAL Laboratory, Nintendo; Tony Hawk's Pro Skater 3 — Neversoft, Activision	**Outstanding Achievement in Art Direction**: **Ico** — **SCE Japan Studio**; Halo: Combat Evolved — Bungie, Microsoft Game Studios; Metal Gear Solid 2: Sons of Liberty — Konami; Oddworld: Munch's Oddysee — Oddworld Inhabitants, Microsoft Game Studios; Star Wars Rogue Squadron II: Rogue Leader — Factor 5, LucasArts
**Outstanding Achievement in Sound Design**: **Metal Gear Solid 2: Sons of Liberty** — **Konami**‡; Frequency — Harmonix, Sony Computer Entertainment; Ico — SCE Japan Studio; Tom Clancy's Ghost Recon — Red Storm Entertainment, Ubisoft	**Outstanding Achievement in Original Musical Composition**: **Tropico** — **PopTop Software**, **Gathering of Developers**‡; Batman Vengeance — Ubisoft Montreal; Harry Potter and the Sorcerer's Stone — KnowWonder, Electronic Arts; Myst III: Exile — Presto Studios, Ubisoft
**Outstanding Achievement in Game Play Engineering**: **Grand Theft Auto III** — **DMA Design**, **Rockstar Games**‡; Black & White — Lionhead Studios, Electronic Arts; Halo: Combat Evolved — Bungie, Microsoft Game Studios; Monopoly Tycoon — Deep Red Games, Infogrames	**Outstanding Achievement in Visual Engineering**: **Halo: Combat Evolved** — **Bungie**, **Microsoft Game Studios**‡; Gran Turismo 3: A-Spec — Polyphony Digital, Sony Computer Entertainment; Microsoft Flight Simulator 2002 — Microsoft Simulation Group; Return to Castle Wolfenstein — Gray Matter Studios, Activision; Tony Hawk's Pro Skater 3 — Neversoft, Activision

=== Console Awards ===
**Console Game of the Year**: **Halo: Combat Evolved** — **Bungie**, **Microsoft Game Studios**‡; Gran Turismo 3: A-Spec — Polyphony Digital, Sony Computer Entertainment; Ico — SCE Japan Studio; Pikmin — Nintendo EAD
**Innovation in Console Gaming**: **Pikmin** — **Nintendo EAD**‡; Halo: Combat Evolved — Bungie, Microsoft Game Studios; Ico — SCE Japan Studio; Oddworld: Munch's Oddysee — Oddworld Inhabitants, Microsoft Game Studios	**Console Action/Adventure Game of the Year**: **Halo: Combat Evolved** — **Bungie**, **Microsoft Game Studios**‡; Conker's Bad Fur Day — Rare; Grand Theft Auto III — DMA Design, Rockstar Games; Ico — SCE Japan Studio; Jak & Daxter: The Precursor Legacy — Naughty Dog, Sony Computer Entertainment
**Console Children's Title of the Year**: **Mario Party 3** — **Hudson Soft**, **Nintendo**‡; Harry Potter and the Sorcerer's Stone — Argonaut Games, Electronic Arts; Tarzan: Untamed — Ubisoft Montreal; Monsters, Inc. — Kodiak Entertainment, Sony Computer Entertainment	**Console Fighting Game of the Year**: **Dead or Alive 3** — **Team Ninja**, **Tecmo**‡; Super Smash Bros. Melee — HAL Laboratory, Nintendo; Victorious Boxers: Ippo's Road to Glory — New Corporation, Empire Interactive
**Hand-Held Game of the Year**: **Advance Wars** — **Intelligent Systems**, **Nintendo**‡; Golden Sun — Camelot Software Planning, Nintendo; Mario Kart: Super Circuit — Intelligent Systems, Nintendo; The Legend of Zelda: Oracle of Seasons — Flagship/Capcom, Nintendo; Tony Hawk's Pro Skater 2 — Vicarious Visions, Activision	**Console Role-Playing Game of the Year**: **Baldur's Gate: Dark Alliance** — **Snowblind Studios**, **Black Isle Studios**, **Interplay Entertainment**‡; Castlevania: Circle of the Moon — Konami; Dark Cloud — Level-5, Sony Computer Entertainment; Golden Sun — Camelot Software Planning, Nintendo; Paper Mario — Intelligent Systems, Nintendo; The Legend of Zelda: Oracle of Ages — Flagship/Capcom, Nintendo
**Console Racing Game of the Year**: **Gran Turismo 3: A-Spec** — **Polyphony Digital**, **Sony Computer Entertainment**‡; NASCAR Thunder 2002 — EA Tiburon; Project Gotham Racing — Bizarre Creations, Microsoft Game Studios; Splashdown — Rainbow Studios, Infogrames, Infogrames	**Console Sports Game of the Year**: **Tony Hawk's Pro Skater 3** — **Neversoft**, **Activision**‡; Madden NFL 2002 — EA Tiburon; NBA 2K2 — Visual Concepts, Sega; SSX Tricky — EA Canada

=== Online Awards ===
**Online Gameplay of the Year**: **Return to Castle Wolfenstein** — **Gray Matter Studios**, **Activision**‡; Aliens Versus Predator 2 — Monolith Productions, Sierra On-Line; MechWarrior 4: Black Knight Expansion — FASA Interactive, Microsoft Game Studios; Monopoly Tycoon — Deep Red Games, Infogrames; Tom Clancy's Ghost Recon — Red Storm Entertainment, Ubisoft	**Massive Multiplayer/Persistent World Game of the Year**: **Dark Age of Camelot** — **Mythic Entertainment**, **Vivendi Universal Games**‡; Asheron's Call: Dark Majesty — Turbine, Microsoft; Phantasy Star Online — Sonic Team, Sega

=== PC Awards ===
**Computer Game of the Year**: **Black & White** — **Lionhead Studios**, **Electronic Arts**‡; Dark Age of Camelot — Mythic Entertainment, Vivendi Universal Games; Return to Castle Wolfenstein — Gray Matter Studios, Activision; Sid Meier's Civilization III — Firaxis Games, Infogrames
**Innovation in Computer Gaming**: **Black & White** — **Lionhead Studios**, **Electronic Arts**‡; Dark Age of Camelot — Mythic Entertainment, Vivendi Universal Games; Majestic — Anim-X, Electronic Arts; The Sims: Hot Date — Maxis, Electronic Arts	**Computer Action/Adventure Game of the Year**: **Return to Castle Wolfenstein** — **Gray Matter Studios**, **Activision**‡; Aliens Versus Predator 2 — Monolith Productions, Sierra On-Line; Clive Barker's Undying — EA Los Angeles; Myst III: Exile — Presto Studios, Ubisoft
**Computer Children's Title of the Year**: **Backyard Basketball** — **Humongous Entertainment**, **Infogrames**‡; Disney's Stanley Tiger Tales — Artech Studios, Disney Interactive; Harry Potter and the Sorcerer's Stone — KnowWonder, Electronic Arts; Scan Command: Jurassic Park — Knowledge Adventure	**Computer Educational Title of the Year**: **Where in the World is Carmen Sandiego? Treasures of Knowledge** — **The Learning Company**, **Riverdeep**‡; Disney Learning: Phonics Quest — Disney Interactive; Spy Masters: Unmask the Prankster — Knowledge Adventure
**Computer Role-Playing Game of the Year**: **Baldur's Gate II: Throne of Bhaal** — **BioWare**, **Black Isle Studios**, **Interplay Entertainment**‡; Diablo II: Lord of Destruction — Blizzard North; Wizardry 8 — Sir-Tech Canada	**Computer Simulation Game of the Year**: **Microsoft Flight Simulator 2002** — **Microsoft Simulation Group**‡; IL-2 Sturmovik — 1C: Maddox Games, Ubisoft; Microsoft Train Simulator — Kuju Entertainment, Microsoft
**Computer Sports Game of the Year**: **FIFA 2002** — **EA Canada**‡; Madden NFL 2002 — EA Tiburon; NHL 2002 — EA Canada	**Computer Strategy Game of the Year**: **Sid Meier's Civilization III** — **Firaxis Games**, **Infogrames**‡; Battle Realms — Liquid Entertainment, Crave Entertainment, Ubisoft; Black & White — Lionhead Studios, Electronic Arts; Kohan: Immortal Sovereigns — TimeGate Studios, Strategy First

=== Hall of Fame Award ===
- Will Wright

=== Multiple nominations and awards ===
==== Multiple Nominations ====
Games that received multiple nominations
Nominations	Game
8	Halo: Combat Evolved
8	Ico
7	Black & White
4	Dark Age of Camelot
4	Return to Castle Wolfenstein
3	Gran Turismo 3: A-Spec
3	Grand Theft Auto III
3	Metal Gear Solid 2: Sons of Liberty
3	Myst III: Exile
3	Oddworld: Munch's Oddysee
3	Pikmin
3	Sid Meier's Civilization III
3	Tony Hawk's Pro Skater 3
2	Aliens Versus Predator 2
2	Conker's Bad Fur Day
2	Dead or Alive 3
2	Golden Sun
2	Harry Potter and the Sorcerer's Stone (PC)
2	Jak & Daxter: The Precursor Legacy
2	Madden NFL 2002
2	Microsoft Flight Simulator 2002
2	Monopoly Tycoon
2	Super Smash Bros. Melee
2	Tom Clancy's Ghost Recon

Nominations by company
Nominations	Games	Company
19	11	Electronic Arts
17	7	Microsoft Game Studios
16	6	Sony Computer Entertainment
13	9	Nintendo
9	6	Ubisoft
8	3	Activision
8	1	Bungie
7	1	Lionhead Studios
4	3	Infogrames
4	2	Infogrames
4	2	Konami
4	1	Gray Matter Studios
4	1	Mythic Entertainment
4	1	Vivendi Universal Games
3	3	Intelligent Systems
3	1	Argonaut Games
3	1	DMA Design
3	1	Firaxis Games
3	1	Neversoft
3	1	Oddworld Inhabitants
3	1	Polyphony Digital
3	1	Presto Studios
3	1	Rockstar Games
2	2	Black Isle Studios
2	2	Disney Interactive
2	2	Flagship
2	2	Interplay Entertainment
2	2	Knowledge Adventure
2	2	Sega
2	1	Camelot Software Planning
2	1	Deep Red Games
2	1	HAL Laboratory
2	1	Monolith Productions
2	1	Naughty Dog
2	1	Rare
2	1	Red Storm Entertainment
2	1	Sierra On-Line
2	1	Team Ninja
2	1	Tecmo

==== Multiple awards ====
Games that received multiple awards
Awards	Game
4	Halo: Combat Evolved
2	Black & White
2	Grand Theft Auto III
2	Ico
2	Return to Castle Wolfenstein

Awards by company
Awards	Games	Company
6	3	Microsoft Game Studios
4	1	Bungie
3	3	Nintendo
3	2	Activision
3	2	Electronic Arts
3	2	Sony Computer Entertainment
2	2	Interplay Entertainment
2	1	DMA Design
2	1	Gray Matter Studios
2	1	Lionhead Studios
2	1	Rockstar Games
