= FIFA 13 =

2012 video game

- Cover art featuring Barcelona's Lionel Messi
- Developers: EA Canada; EA Romania (mobile)
- Publisher: EA Sports
- Producers: David Rutter; Kaz Makita
- Series: FIFA
- Engine: Impact
- Platforms: Microsoft Windows Consoles: PlayStation 2 PlayStation 3 Xbox 360 Wii Wii U; Handheld: PlayStation Portable PlayStation Vita Nintendo 3DS; Mobile: iOS Windows Phone 8 Java ME
- Release: NA: 25 September 2012; AU: 27 September 2012; EU: 28 September 2012; JP: 18 October 2012; Wii U: NA: 18 November 2012; PAL: 30 November 2012; JP: 8 December 2012; Windows Phone: WW: 8 July 2013
- Genre: Sports
- Modes: Single-player, multiplayer

FIFA 13 is a football simulation video game developed by EA Canada and published by Electronic Arts worldwide under the EA Sports label. The game was released in late September 2012 in most regions with the Japanese release being in October.^{[a]}

It is the only FIFA game released on the Wii U (for which it was a launch title), while also being the first game in the series to use the PlayStation Move on the PlayStation 3 and the Kinect sensor on the Xbox 360. FIFA 13 included new features to the FIFA franchise such as the First Touch Control and new celebrations were also added. A demo of the game was released on 11 September 2012, with the following teams being playable: Borussia Dortmund, Manchester City, Juventus, A.C. Milan, Arsenal, and was downloaded a record 1.99 million times within three days.

== Features ==
A new additional feature in FIFA 13 is to support Kinect for Xbox 360 and PlayStation Move for PlayStation 3. The Wii U version includes some exclusive touch-based features including the ability to shoot precisely by tapping an image of the goal and managing the match in real-time.

=== Leagues ===
The leagues in FIFA 13 have been confirmed by EA Sports through their website, with EA calling it "the most authentic football game on the planet with 30 of the world's best leagues" All leagues from FIFA 12 are included, with the addition of the Saudi Professional League for the first time in the series history.

Bundesliga clubs Borussia Dortmund against Bayern Munich in FIFA 13

=== National teams ===
There are 46 international teams on FIFA 13 as confirmed on the EA website. The Czech Republic and Paraguay are returning. India, Bolivia and Venezuela return to the main series after an 11-year hiatus since FIFA Football 2002. Croatia was removed from the international teams, as they could not reach the licensing agreement.

=== Career mode ===
Career mode this year has been updated, with players being able to manage an international team as well as a club. Players managing their particular clubs can manage to quit their jobs as a national coach. Players can choose their international squad to be played for international matches in career mode. In each match, players can decide if the football players are able to play on the next international squad. Options in transfers include counter-offers and offering a player as well as money. On the iOS platform, players cannot manage national teams and can only offer money to get players.

=== Seasons Mode ===
Seasons mode allows players to progress through an online league system by being pitted against players of a similar skill level. After the user chooses a real-world team to play as, an online player with similar skills and a similar star level team is found as an opponent.

The football player plays ten matches per season with a specific number of points required for promotion to the league above.

=== Ultimate Team ===
FIFA Ultimate Team, commonly abbreviated to 'FUT', is an additional feature of FIFA 13. This game mode allows the player to build their own team from real world players, which they can then use to compete in tournaments and divisions over the internet. For each game completed, players earn coins to spend on improving their team.

Players and other items in this mode take the form of cards, which are obtained through buying packs or from buying directly from other players through the auction house. There are three different tiers of cards; bronze, silver and gold, indicating their quality (lowest being non-rare bronze, highest being rare gold). These cards can be obtained in two ways; buying packs or buying directly from other players. Player cards have an overall rating, which is an estimate of their overall in game quality.

The FIFA Ultimate team web app was released on 18 September 2012, allowing players to access their ultimate team from their computer and a variety of other devices, such as an iPhone app and on Android.

== Stadiums ==
There are 26 stadiums in FIFA 13, including two new real ones: Tottenham Hotspur's White Hart Lane and the Saudi Arabia's King Fahd International Stadium. FC Barcelona's Camp Nou, present in previous editions of the game, does not appear in FIFA 13, as EA could not reach a licensing agreement with the club. Because of this, a generic stadium called El Libertador, is used.

FIFA 13 again features Sky Sports main commentators Martin Tyler & Alan Smith commentating on League Matches with ITV main commentators Clive Tyldesley & Andy Townsend on the Cup Matches. 3 new voices have been added to FIFA 13: Sky Sports Reporter Geoff Shreeves is touchline reporter explaining the severity of an injury, Alan McInally has goals as they go in from the other matches in a role he performs on Soccer Saturday on Sky Sports and Mike West reads out the classified results from the league or cup your team is in, he performs this role on BBC football results show Final Score.

=== Covers ===
The North American cover for the game features Lionel Messi, whilst St James' Park, Newcastle, has been included as the background. Other location-based covers will be used, as in previous years, and feature Messi and other players from the respective region, except North America, which only features Messi. This is the first time since FIFA Soccer 2003 that the North American version had a single cover athlete.

EA Sports also offered a downloadable cover for FIFA 13 for Major League Soccer, featuring Chris Wondolowski of the San Jose Earthquakes, Fredy Montero of Seattle Sounders FC, Tim Cahill of the New York Red Bulls, and Darren Mattocks of Vancouver Whitecaps FC. Wondolowski, Montero, and Cahill were elected by vote on EA Sports' website, while Mattocks was included for being named Best Player Under 24 in MLS by MLS. EA Sports also offered downloadable covers for each MLS team with a player from that club being featured. The teams and players were:

=== Wii and PlayStation Vita versions ===
The Wii and PlayStation Vita versions of FIFA 13 are recycled previous year titles rather than brand new, ground-up developments. Media outlet Nintendo Gamer pointed out using various comparison screenshots that FIFA 13 on Wii is actually the Wii version of FIFA 12 with some minor updates to club kits, listings and graphics textures, whilst menu designs and game mechanics are mostly identical. IGN also pointed out that Electronic Arts treated the PlayStation Vita version of FIFA 13 in a similar manner, calling it a "cynically re-skinned" version of the console's previous title FIFA Football (FIFA Soccer in North America; which is actually the title of FIFA 12 on the console). Whilst this version does include some of the new online features found on the PlayStation 3 version, the menus, backgrounds, modes, and most game mechanics are largely identical to the previous title. IGN justifies that the Wii version as a recycled development since the game was released in the console's twilight period, and additionally considering the game is also available on the console's successor, the Wii U, which was confirmed as a completely new development. Additionally, in an interview with Wired, EA's COO Peter Moore says, "Year on year, Wii has just dropped, and clearly we don't make games for it anymore." However, IGN states there is no justification for the PlayStation Vita's version in either its development or the game's price, as the console itself was still in its early years, and questioning EA's official comment, "It is the same great FIFA gameplay for the PS Vita."

Electronic Arts continued this recycling development trend in future installments on these platforms, as well as any other platform they did not deem profitable enough, releasing them under a "Legacy Edition" label starting with FIFA 14.

== Reception ==
=== Critical response ===
FIFA 13 received critical acclaim. During the 16th Annual D.I.C.E. Awards, the Academy of Interactive Arts & Sciences awarded FIFA 13 with "Sports Game of the Year". IGN gave FIFA 13 a 9/10. GamesRadar called FIFA 13 "a great evolutionary step for EA's footy juggernaut", but criticised the collision engine as "unnatural", and the newly revamped Career Mode as "forced and artificial" and "archaic" – awarding it 4 stars. GameSpot gave FIFA 13 a score of 8/10, praising the new skill games, but bemoaning the lack of improvement over FIFA 12. OXM reported that the seven biggest flaws of FIFA 12 were, for the most part, fixed in FIFA 13. PC Gamer awarded the Microsoft Windows version of the game a score of 86/100, stating that it is still an "excellent football game", but "has been overburdened by features and is hungry for some real innovation". The PSP version of the game was also praised, garnering a favourable review Pocket Gamer, who described it as "worthwhile addition to the handheld's already vast repertoire", giving it an 8/10 score. FIFA 13 received a positive review on iOS from CNET, proclaiming it "not only the best soccer game, but the best sports game on an iOS device", bestowing upon it 4.5/5 rating.

Reviews for other platforms were more negative. Nintendo's Wii version received a negative review from ONM, who stated that the game was a "shamefully cynical 'update' that brings absolutely nothing new to the table", giving the game a 30% rating. Reviews for the PS Vita were equally cynical about the amount of work EA had put into the latest version of the series, with OPM calling the game an "exact clone" of FIFA Football, and stating that "there isn't a single new feature in FIFA 13" – awarding the game 5/10. The 3DS edition received a poor review from GamingXP, with "clumsy controls" being an overriding complaint. IGN gave the PlayStation Vita version a 4.0/10, stating, "There's nothing inherently wrong with FIFA 13 on the Vita from a mechanical point of view. But something went wrong. EA has chosen not to get behind Sony's latest handheld. The potential of FIFA on a handheld certainly hasn't been realised."

=== Sales ===
FIFA 13 sold more than one million copies (1.23 million units in 48 hours) in the United Kingdom in its first week of release (the fourth game to do so after Call of Duty: Modern Warfare 2, Call of Duty: Black Ops and Call of Duty: Modern Warfare 3), and topped the UKIE charts on all formats week ending 29 September 2012. 4.5 million copies were sold worldwide in five days, with 7.4 million units sold four weeks after its release, which makes the game the biggest videogame launch of 2012 and biggest sports videogame launch of all-time according to EA. As of May 2013, FIFA 13 has sold 14.5 million copies.

== Notes ==
a In Japan, the game was published only on the following console platforms: PlayStation 3, PlayStation Vita, PlayStation Portable, Xbox 360, and Wii U. It is also available for Microsoft Windows and iOS, but those versions are without Japan's localised packaging/presentation.

b Localised covers are not included on Nintendo's platforms in the Middle East and Poland since Nintendo of Europe has no localisation offices in either territories, albeit it distributes its games in those places. In the case of the Middle East, official localisation of Nintendo's products is handled by an Emirati company called Active Gulf, a branch of a licensed Japanese distributor called Active Boeki, which imports all of its games, including third-party titles, from the North American region, in which only some Nintendo-published titles have a localised packaging. Stadlbauer Sp., Nintendo's last licensed trader in Poland since 2012, was responsible for distribution of Nintendo's products in the country before ceasing their operations in August 2013. They only locally distributed pan-European editions of Nintendo's licensed games as published for "other" European markets.
