= FIFA Football 2002 =

2001 video game

- Arsenal forward Thierry Henry is the cover athlete worldwide.
- Developer: EA Canada
- Publisher: EA Sports
- Series: FIFA
- Platforms: Windows, PlayStation, PlayStation 2, GameCube
- Release: EU: 2 November 2001; NA: 6 November 2001; GameCube: NA: 21 November 2001
- Genre: Sports
- Modes: Single-player, multiplayer

FIFA Football 2002, (Note: Known as FIFA Soccer 2002: Major League Soccer in North America and FIFA 2002: Road to FIFA World Cup (FIFA 2002 ロード・トゥ・FIFAワールドカップ) in Japan.) commonly known as FIFA 2002 and known in North America as FIFA Soccer 2002: Major League Soccer, is a football video game released in 2001, produced by Electronic Arts and released by EA Sports. FIFA 2002 is the ninth game in the FIFA series.

== Gameplay ==
Power bars for passes were introduced, and dribbling reduced in order to attain a higher challenge level. The power bar can also be customised to suit the gamer's preference. The game also includes club emblems for many more European clubs as well as for major Dutch clubs such as PSV, AFC Ajax and Feyenoord, although there was no Dutch league of any kind (they were under the "Rest of World" header). This game also features, for the first time, the Swiss Super League, at the cost of excluding the Greek League. A card reward system licensed from Panini was also introduced where, after winning a particular competition, a star player card is unlocked.

Similar to FIFA 98, this game features a Road to the World Cup game mode featuring the real-life format of each qualification zone as well as every team that had participated in it (except Oceania), however the World Cup itself is not featured, either as part of the mode or as its own mode. If the player chooses any nations that had automatically qualified for the 2002 FIFA World Cup (i.e. France, Japan, and South Korea), the player is instead tasked with improving their FIFA ranking through international friendlies. As a bonus for qualifying from each region, the game will unlock continental cups from said region (marking the only time they appear in a FIFA game, except for the UEFA Euro), winning each regional cup would give the player a Panini card featuring star players from each continent. Once the player unlocks and wins all of the regional cups, the game will unlock the FIFA Confederations Cup as a bonus (also the only time it appears in a FIFA game).

However, most of the international teams featured in the game are not licensed (some of them down to the players' names like the Netherlands), while smaller countries such as Barbados, were only given numbers as player names. To date, this was the last FIFA edition (not counting the World Cup versions) to feature the Japan national team, since Japan Football Association would go on to concede exclusive rights to Konami's Pro Evolution Soccer series. Also, this was the final FIFA edition to feature the Israel Premier League and its teams.

France and Arsenal star Thierry Henry is featured as the cover star. FIFA Football 2002 is the last FIFA for 10 years to only have one person as the cover star, before Lionel Messi appeared alone on FIFA 13.

== Reception ==
Reception

Aggregate score
Aggregator	Score			
Aggregator	GameCube	PC	PS	PS2
Metacritic	81/100	77/100	81/100	82/100

Review scores
Publication	Score			
Publication	GameCube	PC	PS	PS2
AllGame	4/5	N/A	N/A	N/A
Computer Games Magazine	N/A	3/5	N/A	N/A
Electronic Gaming Monthly	7/10	N/A	N/A	N/A
EP Daily	8.5/10	N/A	N/A	N/A
Famitsu	34/40	N/A	N/A	32/40
Game Informer	8/10	N/A	N/A	8/10
GameSpot	8.9/10	9.3/10	8.7/10	8.7/10
GameSpy	82%	N/A	N/A	N/A
IGN	8.6/10	6.3/10	N/A	8.5/10
Next Generation	N/A	N/A	N/A	4/5
Nintendo Power	4.3/5	N/A	N/A	N/A
Nintendo World Report	7/10	N/A	N/A	N/A
Official U.S. PlayStation Magazine	N/A	N/A	N/A	4.5/5
PC Gamer (US)	N/A	89%	N/A	N/A
BBC Sport	N/A	N/A	N/A	88%

The game received "favourable" reviews on all platforms according to the review aggregation website Metacritic. Gary Whitta of NextGen said of the PlayStation 2 version in its final issue, "With improved tactics and graphics, FIFA 2002 once again cements itself at the top of the virtual soccer universe." In Japan, where the GameCube version was ported for release on 15 November 2001, followed by the PlayStation 2 version two weeks after (29 November), Famitsu gave it a score of 34 out of 40 for the former version, and 32 out of 40 for the latter version.

Air Hendrix of GamePro's December 2001 issue called the PlayStation 2 version "an absolutely gorgeous game, packing in fantastic animations, lavish player models, and stadiums with cool details like flags waving in the stands." (Note: GamePro gave the PlayStation 2 version 5/5 for graphics, 4/5 for sound, and two 4.5/5 scores for control and fun factor.) An issue later, The D-Pad Destroyer said, "The saddest thing about the GameCube version of FIFA 2002 is that it had to come out this year. Given a little more time with Nintendo's infant hardware, EA Sports could have worked its trademark magic to get more GameCube goodness in the game. As it is, it seems like a direct PlayStation 2 port with somewhat clunky GameCube controls. A World Cup contender, perhaps, but it comes up short of the winning goal." (Note: GamePro gave the GameCube version 4/5 for graphics, 4.5/5 for sound, and two 3.5/5 scores for control and fun factor.)

Michael Lafferty of GameZone gave the PlayStation version nine out of ten, calling it "the best PlayStation soccer game currently on the market. The gameplay, graphics and audio tracks are all superb." He later gave the PC version 8.8 out of 10, saying that it "transcends previous incarnations of the sport, enlivening the screen with realistic game play, and lively graphical elements." Kevin Krause gave the PlayStation 2 version 8.6 out of 10, calling it "a next generation soccer game that is enjoyable to play and more importantly, an accurate simulation of how the game is actually played by the pros."

The console versions were nominated for the "Best Sports, Traditional Game" award at GameSpot's Best and Worst of 2001 Awards, which went to NBA 2K2; the PC version did, however, win the award for "Best Sports Game". The same PC version also won the award for "PC Sports" at AIAS' 5th Annual Interactive Achievement Awards. The game was nominated at The Electric Playground's 2001 Blister Awards for "Best Sports Game for PC", "Best Console Sports Game", and "Best Canadian Console Game of the Year", but lost to High Heat Major League Baseball 2002, Madden NFL 2002, and NHL Hitz 2002, respectively.
