= High Heat Major League Baseball =

Series of baseball video games

High Heat Major League Baseball was a series of baseball video games, released on PlayStation, Xbox, PlayStation 2, and Microsoft Windows. There were six annual versions of the game released, starting with High Heat Baseball 1999, and ending with High Heat Major League Baseball 2004.

With the exception of the first game in the series, the officially licensed teams and player names from all 30 Major League Baseball teams were included. The series was created by games company 3DO (under the Team .366 brand), which filed for bankruptcy in 2003, soon after the release of the final version of the series, High Heat Major League Baseball 2004. In August 2003, Microsoft purchased the rights to the High Heat franchise from 3DO; however, Microsoft has yet to develop a new title in the series.

High Heat was traditionally known for possessing more simulation-style qualities than competitors World Series Baseball, All-Star Baseball, or Triple Play, but frequently lagged behind in graphical quality.

== Games ==
Game	Release date	Cover athlete (team)	Platforms
High Heat Baseball 1999	April 1998		Microsoft Windows
High Heat Baseball 2000	April 1, 1999		PlayStation, Microsoft Windows
Sammy Sosa High Heat Baseball 2001	February 29, 2000	Sammy Sosa (Chicago Cubs)	PlayStation, Microsoft Windows
High Heat Major League Baseball 2002	March 5, 2001	Vladimir Guerrero (Montreal Expos)	PlayStation, PlayStation 2, Game Boy Advance, Microsoft Windows
High Heat Major League Baseball 2003	February 12, 2002	Curt Schilling (Arizona Diamondbacks)	PlayStation 2, Game Boy Advance, Microsoft Windows
High Heat Major League Baseball 2004	February 18, 2003	Curt Schilling (Arizona Diamondbacks)	PlayStation 2, Xbox, Microsoft Windows

== Reception ==
At the core of High Heat′s gameplay was its batter-pitcher interface, which was often hailed as the most realistic of its era.

According to GameDaily, "Although [the original] High Heat Baseball was not a big seller, the game won numerous awards".
