= Beach Life =

2002 video game

- Developer(s): Deep Red Games
- Publisher(s): Eidos Interactive
- Producer(s): Andrew Wensley
- Platform(s): Windows
- Release: EU: September 6, 2002; NA: September 10, 2002; AU: September 27, 2002
- Genre(s): Business simulation
- Mode(s): Single-player

Beach Life (known as Virtual Resort: Spring Break in North America) is a business strategy video game for Windows developed by Deep Red Games, published by Eidos Interactive and released in September 2002.

== Gameplay ==
Beach Life is a business simulation game in the same vein as Theme Park and Rollercoaster Tycoon. In the game, the player manages an Ibiza-style holiday resort, complete with themed clubs, bars, and surf shops. Through learning what their guests want from their stay, different kinds of attractions and food and drink establishments can be built to satisfy their needs and make more money. Staff can be hired to help facilitate this, such as cleaners, mechanics, and security guards.

Gameplay options themselves come in two forms: the Scenario mode and the Sandbox mode. In Scenario mode, the player works their way through island after island, completing a number of set objectives in each. Their progress on a resort can be hampered by hazards such as shark attacks and thunderstorms, all while they build attractions and cater to the needs of the guests. Once they have beaten a level in Scenario mode, they can unlock it in Sandbox mode. Sandbox mode is essentially a "free-play" mode, where there are no objectives, unlimited time and more building options.

== Development and release ==
A screenshot of the fixed isometric perspective gameplay of Beach Life.

Project leader Steve Beverley stated that the idea of Beach Life came from "toying with the idea of creating a 'people-watching' simulation game" inspired by the party culture of Ibiza and Aiya Napa. Deep Red Games pitched this idea to Eidos Interactive executive Ian Livingstone, who supported the convergence of "cheap booze, loud music, romance, polluted water, mosquitoes, hot sun (and) beach volleyball" as "the perfect experience to simulate in a game". The developers of Beach Life stated the isometric graphics were inspired by Commandos 2 and Desperados: Wanted Dead or Alive, and the features of the game were influenced by The Sims: Hot Date and RollerCoaster Tycoon.

Despite receiving a mild ESRB classification rating of 'Teen', Beach Life was marketed in Europe as an adult game, with a far more suggestive cover and marketing than the US version. Project lead Steve Beverly stated the studio was "exploring the fine line" between the adult innuendo and a more family-friendly content rating. Reviewers observed many of the "gaudy, voyeuristic details" implied by the marketing were not, in fact, depicted in the game. Brett Todd of GameSpot noted "the closest you get to adult content here are the bikini babes on the box cover". The game was released for exclusively for Windows in 2002 in Europe on September 6, North America on September 10, and Australia on September 27.

== Reception ==
Beach Life

Aggregate score
Aggregator	Score
Metacritic	69/100 (PC; based on 14 reviews)

Review scores
Publication	Score
Computer Games Magazine	3/5 stars
Computer Gaming World	1.5/5 stars
Eurogamer	6/10
GameSpot	6.4
GameSpy	70
Hyper	72%
IGN	7.8
PC Gamer (US)	79%
PC PowerPlay	80%

Beach Life received mixed reviews, with review aggregator Metacritic indicating the game received "mixed or average" with an average score of 69 out of 100 based on 14 reviews.

Positive reviews of Beach Life focused on the appeal and novelty of the game's concept. Dan Adams of IGN stated "it's a tycoon game with some personality and a bit of style...it's a fairly simple tycoon game, albeit a relatively fun simple tycoon game...what other game actually tells you to get a certain number of people drunk and hooking up?" Jere Lawrence of PC PowerPlay similarly stated "Beach Life is fun to muck about with...watching your guests get drunk and go in for some convivial calisthenics on the beach is amusing...the sheer variety of buildings on offer, coupled with the fact that some appeal to women more than men, makes for some interesting strategic challenges."

Reviewers of Beach Life were mixed on the tone and marketing of the game. Jere Lawrence praised the "good sense of humor...that permeates every line of code in this game". Rick Ernst of Computer Gaming World dismissed the "annoying" presentation of the game, stating "anyone who's made it through puberty will likely be embarrassed by the game's lame toilet humor."

Critics of Beach Life found the visual presentation of the game was dated. Martin Taylor of Eurogamer stated "visually, Beach Life is unremarkable. Everything is pre-rendered and the islands themselves are devoid of animation." Several critics expressed annoyance that the camera cannot be rotated, creating issues with perspective and item placement.

Negative reviews of Beach Life also critiqued the lack of customization as a significant limitation to the longevity of the gameplay. Cam Shea of Hyper stated the game could have used "more hands-on options, such as greater scope in landscaping and customising structures". Allen Rausch of GameSpy stated that "after finishing the scenarios and a short time fooling around with the maps in sandbox mode, you've basically seen everything the game has to offer." Similarly, Jason Cross of Computer Games Magazine noted "you can't rotate the map, only buildings. Painstakingly bulldozing every shrub in the way of the building you're trying to place is annoying."
