= Sammy Sosa High Heat Baseball 2001 =

2000 baseball video game

- Developer: Team .366
- Publisher: The 3DO Company
- Series: High Heat Major League Baseball
- Platforms: Microsoft Windows, PlayStation
- Release: Windows: NA: March 7, 2000; EU: June 30, 2000; Championship Edition: NA: September 2000; PlayStation: NA: March 23, 2000
- Genre: Sports
- Modes: Single-player, multiplayer

Sammy Sosa High Heat Baseball 2001 is a video game released in 2000, and is the third game in the High Heat Major League Baseball video game series. It was the first game in the series to feature then-Chicago Cubs right fielder Sammy Sosa on the cover.

== Reception ==
Reception

Aggregate score
Aggregator	Score	
Aggregator	PC	PS
GameRankings	85%	52%

Review scores
Publication	Score	
Publication	PC	PS
CNET Gamecenter	8/10	4/10
Computer Games Strategy Plus	4/5	N/A
Computer Gaming World	5/5	N/A
Electronic Gaming Monthly	N/A	4/10 (Note: In Electronic Gaming Monthly's review of the PlayStation version, one critic gave it 5/10, two gave it each a score of 4/10, and another gave it 3/10.)
Eurogamer	7/10	N/A
Game Informer	N/A	3.75/10
GameFan	N/A	69% (Note: In GameFan's viewpoint of the PlayStation version, one critic gave it a score of 74, and the other 63.)
GameSpot	8.7/10	5.4/10
GameSpy	91%	N/A
GameZone	9.5/10	N/A
IGN	8/10	5.5/10
Official U.S. PlayStation Magazine	N/A	2/5
PC Accelerator	9/10	N/A
PC Gamer (US)	93%	N/A

The PC version received "favorable" reviews, while the PlayStation version received "mixed" reviews, according to the review aggregation website GameRankings. GamePro called the PC version "a good game that's left on the verge of becoming a great one." (Note: GamePro gave the PC version two 3.5/5 scores for graphics and sound, and two 4/5 scores for control and overall fun factor.)

Brad Cook of AllGame gave the PC version four stars out of five, saying that it was "definitely worth picking up if you're a diehard baseball fan. The ability to play out current players' careers and get them into the Hall of Fame while nurturing the paths of newcomers is worth the purchase price alone." However, Mark Kanarick gave the PlayStation version three-and-a-half stars, saying, "Sammy Sosa High Heat Baseball 2001 is really on its way up. If the developers can take care of some control issues for next year's version, they may really have a winner to compete with the 'Big Two.'"

The staff of Computer Games Magazine nominated the PC version for their 2000 "Sports Game of the Year" award, whose winner remains unknown. It won the award for Sports at Computer Gaming World's 2001 Premier Awards. The game was a runner-up for GameSpy's "2000 Sports Game of the Year", which went to PGA Championship Golf 2000. The staff called it "the best action baseball game to ever grace a PC." Though not reviewed, the game was nominated for the "Best Sports Game for PC" award at The Electric Playground's Blister Awards 2000, which went to Tony Hawk's Pro Skater 2.
