= Vegas Tycoon =

2003 video game

- Developer(s): Deep Red Games
- Publisher(s): Global Star
- Platform(s): Windows
- Release: EU: October 14, 2003; NA: January 19, 2004; Steam: December 21, 2006
- Genre(s): Business simulation game Strategy
- Mode(s): Single player PEGI 3+

Vegas Tycoon (also styled Vega$: Make It B!G) is a business simulation game for Windows that was released October 14, 2003 in Europe and January 19, 2004, in North America.

== Gameplay ==
The player is tasked with building and maintaining a Las Vegas resort with hotels and casinos while keeping guests entertained.

== Reception ==
Reception

Aggregate score
Aggregator	Score
Metacritic	76/100

Review scores
Publication	Score
Computer Games Magazine	80/100
Edge	6/10
GameSpy	85/100
GameZone	8.2/10
IGN	7.7/10
PC Games (DE)	73/100

The game has received mainly positive reviews with IGN calling it "a pretty fun and complex tycoon experience".
