= SeaWorld Adventure Parks Tycoon =

2003 video game

- Developer(s): Deep Red Games
- Publisher(s): Activision Value
- Platform(s): Windows
- Release: October 22, 2003
- Genre(s): Business Simulation
- Mode(s): Single player

SeaWorld Adventure Parks Tycoon is a business simulation Windows game based on the SeaWorld parks that was released in 2003. It was published by Activision Value and developed by Deep Red Games. It had a sequel, SeaWorld Adventure Parks Tycoon 2, released in 2005 (2006 in Europe).

== Overview ==
The game puts the player in the position of managing SeaWorld parks from a 2.5D (isometric) perspective. (The San Diego, San Antonio, and Orlando parks.) It features two different modes of play. One is a mode where the player must complete certain tasks in the park (often pre-built) before moving on. The second is a sandbox mode where the player starts building their own park out of the given barren land and a certain budget. In this mode, there are no limitations to what a player can and cannot do within the park grounds.

== Reception ==
In the United States, SeaWorld Adventure Parks Tycoon sold 290,000 copies and earned $5.4 million by August 2006, after its release in September 2003. It was the country's 69th best-selling computer game between January 2000 and August 2006. Combined sales of all SeaWorld Adventure Parks Tycoon computer games released between January 2000 and August 2006 had reached 450,000 units in the United States by the latter date.

== Sequel ==
SeaWorld Adventure Parks Tycoon 2 was released January 25, 2005.
