= House Flipper =

2018 video game

- Developer: Empyrean
- Publishers: Frozen District, PlayWay
- Engine: Unity
- Platforms: macOS; Windows; PlayStation 4; Xbox One; Nintendo Switch; Android; iOS
- Release: macOS, Windows: WW: 17 May 2018; PlayStation 4: WW: 25 February 2020; Xbox One: WW: 26 February 2020; Nintendo Switch: WW: 12 June 2020; Android: AU: 16 October 2020; UK: 21 October 2020; NA: 28 October 2020; iOS: WW: 22 October 2020
- Genre: Simulation
- Mode: Single-player

House Flipper is a simulation game developed by Empyrean and published by Frozen District and PlayWay for macOS, Windows, PlayStation 4, Xbox One, and Nintendo Switch. It was initially released on 17 May 2018. A mobile version, entitled House Flipper: Home Design, was released for Android and iOS in October 2020. A sequel, House Flipper 2, was released in December 2023.

== Gameplay ==
House Flipper is a simulation game played in the first-person perspective. Gameplay involves fixing up properties in order to create a profit. Tasks that can be performed include painting, laying down tiles, cleaning, installations, and demolition. Some of these tasks are unlocked as the game progresses, and tools can be upgraded to perform them faster. The game includes a catalog that lets players browse through different options of furniture, wallpaper, doors, and windows.

There are several modes of play in House Flipper; first, players need to complete quests (which can be accessed through email) for money. Quests can involve cleaning, painting walls, placing furniture and remodelling homes. Once quests are completed, the player is rewarded with money depending on the size of the job and how well it is completed. Elsewhere, players can buy and resell houses according to buyers’ needs. Each house has a selection of potential buyers with different needs such as cleanliness or a family room. These buyers compete for the house in an auction, bidding depending on how much it suits their needs. As well as this, player can buy and customize houses for themselves.

== Reception ==
Reception

Aggregate score
Aggregator	Score
Metacritic	PC: 68/100; NS: 56/100

Review scores
Publication	Score
Game Informer	6/10
Nintendo World Report	7.5/10

House Flipper received "mixed or average reviews" according to review aggregator platform Metacritic, with multiple reviewers commenting that fixing up the homes is satisfying while questioning its long-term playability. Kotaku reviewed the game, stating that they found it satisfying to fix up homes that are "often extremely gross or ugly" and that "Manifesting your vision of a decent, sellable house onto these garbage heaps feels amazing—especially because it happens on such a granular scale." Game Informer was more mixed, writing that "Flipping your first few houses is fun, but the game doesn't have the scope or flexibility to stay interesting for long". PC Gamer was critical, stating that "There's a definite satisfaction in taking a gross room and making it look nice, and it's pretty cool that you can knock down (and rebuild) walls, but I just don't find the act of slowly and mechanically painting and cleaning much fun, especially with the knowledge that my actual house could do with a bit of that." It became a bestseller on Steam.

=== Awards ===
The game was nominated for "Game, Simulation" at the National Academy of Video Game Trade Reviewers Awards. House Flipper was also awarded Poznań Game Arena Best Polish Indie Game of 2018.

== Downloadable content ==
Together with the base game, on 17 May 2018, a free Apocalypse Flipper DLC was released. The player receives more items and 5 new properties that can be bought.

On 16 May 2019, the Garden Flipper DLC was released. This allows the player to apply renovations to the gardens of properties. The player can then participate in the garden competitions where their work will be evaluated and given a score. The property can then be sold at a higher price depending on the score that was achieved.

On 14 May 2020, the HGTV DLC was released. This DLC features new jobs, items, gameplay-mechanics and properties that can be bought. The latter requires the player to first complete the corresponding jobs.

On 19 November 2020, a new free Cyberpunk Flipper DLC was released. The DLC adds a new property for renovation and a set of props, all centered around the cyberpunk theme.

In 2021, PlayWay announced two additional DLCs; the Pets DLC is centered around adopting and keeping pets such as dogs and cats, while the Luxury Flipper DLC, released in late 2021, is based around renovating expensive modern and old houses in a new town - Moonrise Bay.
