= High Heat Baseball 2000 =

1999 sports video game

- Developer: Team .366
- Publisher: The 3DO Company
- Series: High Heat Major League Baseball
- Platforms: Windows, PlayStation
- Release: Windows: NA: April 1, 1999; PlayStation: NA: May 18, 1999
- Genre: Sports
- Modes: Single-player, multiplayer

High Heat Baseball 2000 is a video game released in 1999, and is the second game in the High Heat Major League Baseball video game series.

== Reception ==
Reception

Aggregate score
Aggregator	Score	
Aggregator	PC	PS
GameRankings	86%	50%

Review scores
Publication	Score	
Publication	PC	PS
AllGame	3/5	2/5
Computer Games Strategy Plus	4/5	N/A
Computer Gaming World	4.5/5	N/A
Electronic Gaming Monthly	N/A	2.625/10
Game Informer	N/A	3.5/10
GameFan	N/A	75%
GamePro	4.5/5	N/A
GameRevolution	N/A	C+
GameSpot	8.6/10	2.9/10
IGN	9/10	4.5/10
Official U.S. PlayStation Magazine	N/A	1/5
PC Accelerator	9/10	N/A
PC Gamer (US)	88%	N/A

The PC version received "favorable" reviews, while the PlayStation version received "mixed" reviews, according to the review aggregation website GameRankings. In Computer Gaming World, Dave Salvator wrote, "HH2K has so much going for it that if you're a hard-core baseball fan looking to get in the action, the game says hello like the business end of a Louisville Slugger."

Daily Radar's Andrew S. Bub described the PC version as a commercial disappointment. It sold 46,238 copies in the U.S. by the end of 1999, according to PC Data. Bub wrote, "Shame on you for letting EA Sports' all-flash-no-substance Triple Play 2000 outsell this gem."

The PC version won Computer Gaming World's 1999 "Sports Game of the Year" award, and was a runner-up in the magazine's overall "Game of the Year" category. The staff declared it "simply one of the best games of the year. Period." PC Gamer US likewise named it the best sports game of 1999, and wrote that it "marked the series' transformation into one of the most complete sports sims on the market." Computer Games Strategy Plus declared it the "Sports Game of the Year", and its staff described it as "the most playable, most enjoyable, and flat out best arcade baseball game that you can buy". PC Accelerator and GameSpot also named it the sports game of the year. It was also a finalist for the Academy of Interactive Arts & Sciences' "Computer Sports Game of the Year" award, which was ultimately given to FIFA 2000.
