= Hysteria Hospital: Emergency Ward =

2009 video game

- Developers: GameInvest; Camel Entertainment
- Publisher: Oxygen Games
- Platforms: Nintendo DS, Windows, Wii
- Release: NA: June 16, 2009; EU: July 17, 2009
- Genre: Strategy
- Mode: Single-player

Hysteria Hospital: Emergency Ward is a casual video game developed by Portuguese studio GameInvest with Camel Entertainment and published by O-Games on June 16, 2009 in North America. It is a simulation/strategy game.

== Gameplay ==
Hysteria Hospital tasks users with coordinating the management of a hospital. The goal of the game is to accumulate money over time by serving patients. Users can purchase new equipment such as X-ray machines to meet the demands of their patients. Main gameplay elements involve diagnosing patients, and moving them to the applicable local facilities if available (or the ambulance to get sent elsewhere). Patients are moved by dragging them to different areas. A nurse is controllable by clicking on objects, and performing chores such as fetching prescriptions, making beds, and cleaning waste.

== Reception ==
Reception

Aggregate scores
Aggregator	Score
GameRankings	(DS) 51% (Wii) 50.30%
Metacritic	(Wii) 53/100 (DS) 45/100

Review scores
Publication	Score
Nintendo Life	3/10
Official Nintendo Magazine	63%

The game was met with mixed reception upon release. GameRankings and Metacritic gave it a score of 51% and 45 out of 100 for the DS version, and 50.30% and 53 out of 100 for the Wii version.

== See also ==
- Diner Dash
