= Heat Project =

- Developer: DOOBIC Entertainment
- Publishers: ParanGAME; Gamania; Asia Eastern
- Designer: Wizet
- Engine: Lithtech
- Platform: Windows
- Release: Unknown(Closed); Unknown(Closed); July 18, 2005(Closed); May 14, 2003
- Genre: First-person shooter/Role-playing video game
- Mode: Online Multiplayer

Heat Project (Korean: 히트프로젝트) is a FPS (First Person Shooter) game based on realistic weapons and places including Alcatraz Island, Mong Kok and the National Palace Museum.

Scoring kills earns the player in-game money to buy weapons, like guns and grenades. Using game points (GASH for Hong Kong and Taiwan), players can also buy more weapons, for example, the SACR (Steyr ACR) can be only bought with game points.

== Storyline ==
In 2020, the Cinor Empire was invading other countries and became a large empire. They used ruthless ways to invade other countries, causing patriots to form a rebellion called Kronoc. The Kronoc rebels hired bio-engineered mercenaries from a wealthy company called Asin, forming the Kronoc Army. The Cinor Empire also hired bio-engineered mercenaries to counterattack the rebel army.

== Ranks ==
Heat Project uses a rank system, players can upgrade their characters with experience points into different ranks, including Private to General. When players are promoted to another rank, they can gain "technique points", which they can use it to learn some special techniques.

Experience points are calculated by the players numbers of kills, deaths and how many rounds did they win and lose. When defeating opponents with more high level than the player, they will gain more experience points.

== Customization ==
There are several ways to customize the player's character, for example, players can change their clothes to other uniforms, for example, Christmas suits, camouflage suits and police uniforms are available. Players can also customize their hair color and character's size. (big and small)

== Gameplay ==
=== Official gameplay modes ===
- Mission Combat - In Mission Combat mode, A team must plant a bomb at one of the bombsites. If the bomb is not planted after 4 minutes, B team will win automatically. It takes 40 seconds to plant or disarm a bomb. Another way to win is to eliminate all players of the opposing team. Players who are killed cannot respawn until the next round.
- Team Death Match - The objective of team deathmatch is to kill 50 or 100 players of the opposite team (decided by the host), players will be divided into two teams (A team and B team). this game can be set into 50 kills or 100 kills until game end. Deathmatch only maps include "Death Room" and some other maps. But all maps can be used for deathmatch and team deathmatch.
- Unlimited Combat - Players will be spawned in different locations in this mode. The game will end when there are 50 or 100 deaths (decided by the host). Deathmatch only maps include "Four Room" and some other maps. But all maps can be used for deathmatch and team deathmatch.

== Maps ==
Most maps in Heat Project are based on realistic places, for example, Alcatraz Island, Mong Kok, National Palace Museum are in this game.

== Versions ==
There are 4 localized versions released for now.

- Korea - Published by ParanGAME.
- Taiwan - Published by Gamania (遊戲橘子)
- Hong Kong - Published by Gamania (遊戲橘子)
- Mainland China - Published by Asia Eastern
