= Monopoly Tycoon =

2001 video game

- North American cover art
- Developer: Deep Red Games
- Publisher: Infogrames (Note: Mobile version developed and published by Mforma.)
- Director: Kevin Buckner
- Designer: Jon Law
- Programmer: Lee Hickey
- Artists: Uzma Khalid; Ian Margetts
- Platforms: Windows, Mobile phones
- Release: Windows: US: September 21, 2001; EU: November 9, 2001; Mobile: EU: March 2005; US: August 24, 2005
- Genre: Business simulation
- Modes: Single-player, multiplayer

Monopoly Tycoon is a construction and management simulation PC game published in 2001 by Infogrames and developed by Deep Red Games. The player operates a business that owns stores and apartments in a city derived from the Monopoly board game. Instead of using dice, the game relies more on the speed and innovativeness of the players. In the standard mode, the user plays against the AI opponents. In the multiplayer version, players go against other online players in order to gain victory.

There are various levels with varying difficulty. Some involve just financial prosperity of the businesses while others involve success in the political arena. But the primary objective of most levels is to accumulate the most wealth in the given time.

== Gameplay ==
In Monopoly Tycoon, the player operates a business by owning businesses, apartments, and being landlord to blocks. The player earns income from selling products and services, housing people in apartments and hotels. Income is also generated from rent for any blocks that the player is landlord of, plus utilities and railroads.

Monopoly Tycoon has the same set of blocks as the board game with an additional three. When a player is landlord of all blocks of the same color, he is able to build hotels. In addition, being landlord of any property allows the player to build park space.

As in the board game, there are railroads and utilities blocks that players can become landlord of and receive income from. To become landlord, there is an auction among the players with the property going to the highest bidder.

At the end of the day, the player is offered a mystery card similar to those from the board game. Some of the cards are a simple deposit or withdrawal of money from the player's account. Other cards allow the player to aid his businesses or harm the opponent, say by restocking one of his stores or giving an opponent block bad publicity.

Monopoly Tycoon also includes support for multiplayer game play over a LAN or Internet connection. Additionally, there is support for finding live online opponents through the included GameSpy Arcade software.

Examining the status of one of your businesses during a game. On the left side you have the summary of its income, profit, sales, etc.

== Music and sound effects ==
The music of the game is lighthearted and changes as the game progresses through the different decades. For example, in the 1970s (1970 and 1975 Monopoly Tycoon years), music from the 1970s can be heard; in 1990 and 1995, 1990s music plays. This music will play until the year 2030 is reached (this year can only be reached in the "My Mega Metropolis" level, "Starting Out", "A Homely City", "Sell, Sell, Sell", and the "First to be Worth $20,000, $25,000, or $40,000" levels). At that point, music from the 1930s can be heard from then on.

After every two days at midnight, the music from the previous decade becomes quieter and quickly fades away, while the music from the next decade starts at normal volume. For example, when midnight of 1960 occurs, the music from the 1950s fades away and the music from the 1960s plays at normal volume.

Other sounds indicate the time of day. People, cars, and the wind all make noises, in varying degrees depending on the time of day. For example, during the morning, footsteps of people waking up and coming out of their apartments is played to signify the time the city wakes up. Throughout the game, also, the sound of coins falling can be heard when the player makes money.

Enabling the music makes the game crash on Windows Vista and later. This is due to the usage of the Windows Media Source Filter (a DirectShow codec) being used to stream .wma files directly from the local Hard Disk, instead of streaming from the CD. Only three games are known to use the filter. Following Windows Vista's release, the filter was removed.

== Development ==
The game was announced by Hasbro Interactive on May 5, 2000, in a press release.

== Reception ==
Reception

Aggregate score
Aggregator	Score
Metacritic	85/100

Review scores
Publication	Score
Computer Gaming World	4.5/5
Game Informer	8.5 out of 10
PC Zone	78/100
Computer Games Magazine	4/5

Monopoly Tycoon was a commercial success, selling nearly 2 million copies by 2006. Lead designer Clive Robert explained that these sales "took years" to achieve, and that the game continued to sell as of 2006, after its release in September 2001. In the United States, Monopoly Tycoon sold 290,000 copies and earned $6.8 million by August 2006. Edge ranked it as the 66th best-selling computer game released in the country between January 2000 and August 2006.

Monopoly Tycoon received "generally favorable" reviews with an average score of 85 out of 100 according to the review aggregation website Metacritic, based on 10 reviews. It received a 'great' score of 8.5/10 from GameSpot and a 'great' score from IGN of 8.2/10. Trey Walker at GameSpot said that "Monopoly Tycoon is the kind of game you might have imagined as a kid while you played the real board game."

The developers of the game, however, were critical of their work saying that "I don't think we got it entirely right either."

During the 5th Annual Interactive Achievement Awards, the Academy of Interactive Arts & Sciences nominated Monopoly Tycoon for the "Online Gameplay" and "Game Play Engineering" awards, which ultimately went to Return to Castle Wolfenstein and Grand Theft Auto III, respectively. Monopoly Tycoon was also a nominee for Computer Gaming World's 2001 "Best Strategy Game" award, although it lost to Kohan: Immortal Sovereigns. The editors presented Monopoly Tycoon with a special prize for the "Best Use of a License That Was Ignored", and wrote, "Blessed with great AI and gameplay, Monopoly Tycoon was probably the most pleasant surprise of the year."
