= High Heat Baseball 1999 =

1998 baseball computer game

- Developer: Team .366
- Publisher: The 3DO Company
- Series: High Heat Major League Baseball
- Platform: Microsoft Windows
- Release: NA: April 1998
- Genre: Sports
- Modes: Single-player, multiplayer

High Heat Baseball 1999, also known as High Heat Baseball or High Heat, is a video game released in 1998, and is the first game in the High Heat Major League Baseball video game series.

== Gameplay ==
High Heat's gameplay options include: exhibition games, season play (16, 18, or 162 games), play-offs, and a home run derby. The game features players licensed through Major League Baseball Players Association but does not carry a Major League Baseball license, so teams appear under placeholder designations, such as "Chicago-N" and "New York-A," rather than their official team organization names and logos.

Pitcher performance statistics affect how well that pitcher throws at the beginning of a game compared to later, how often he uses a given type of pitch, and how well he performs against right-handed or left-handed batters.

== Development ==
High Heat Baseball 1999 was developed by Team .366, an internal development team of The 3DO Company. Development begin in 1995 for 3DO's Opera system, then moved to the Panasonic M2, before finally being targeted towards PCs. A PlayStation port of the game was announced, but was never released.

The developers opted to cut out between-play action such as the ball being returned to the pitcher after a ball or strike, in order to keep games down to about a half-hour for players who do not have time for long gaming sessions.

== Reception ==
Reception

Aggregate score
Aggregator	Score
GameRankings	72%

Review scores
Publication	Score
AllGame	4/5
CNET Gamecenter	7/10
Computer Gaming World	2/5
GameRevolution	B+
GameSpot	7.8/10
IGN	7/10
PC Gamer (US)	86%

The game received "average" reviews according to the review aggregation website GameRankings.
