= High Heat Major League Baseball 2004 =

2003 sports video game

- Developer: The 3DO Company
- Publisher: The 3DO Company
- Series: High Heat Major League Baseball
- Engine: RenderWare
- Platforms: PlayStation 2, Microsoft Windows, Xbox
- Release: PlayStation 2: NA: February 19, 2003; Windows: NA: March 4, 2003; Xbox: NA: March 6, 2003
- Genre: Sports
- Modes: Single-player, multiplayer

High Heat Major League Baseball 2004, also known as High Heat Baseball 2004 or High Heat 2004, is a video game released in 2003, and is the sixth and final game in the High Heat Major League Baseball video game series published by The 3DO Company, before it filed for bankruptcy in May 2003. The game was released on PlayStation 2, Xbox, and Windows. Versions of the game were also intended to launch on Nintendo's Game Boy Advance and GameCube consoles but were scrapped following 3DO's 2003 bankruptcy. Then-Arizona Diamondbacks starting pitcher Curt Schilling is featured on the cover. The Xbox version of the game had the ability to download rosters via Xbox Live. Part of the game's earnings were donated to Schilling's ALS fundraiser "Curt's Pitch for ALS".

== Gameplay ==
Gameplay in High Heat relies on timing the player's hits and throws. When playing as a batter, it mostly comes down to figuring out what kind of pitch their opponent is going to throw and tapping the button at the right moment. Playing as a pitcher is done the same way with the option of a total of 27 different throws as well as a strike and ball button.

== Reception ==
Reception

Aggregate score
Aggregator	Score		
Aggregator	PC	PS2	Xbox
Metacritic	70/100	83/100	83/100

Review scores
Publication	Score		
Publication	PC	PS2	Xbox
AllGame	N/A	3.5/5	N/A
Computer Games Magazine	2.5/5	N/A	N/A
Computer Gaming World	3/5	N/A	N/A
Electronic Gaming Monthly	N/A	9/10	N/A
Game Informer	N/A	7/10	7.25/10
GameSpot	6.4/10	8.1/10	8.1/10
GameSpy	2/5	4.5/5	N/A
GameZone	7/10	8.5/10	7.3/10
IGN	8.4/10	8.1/10	8.2/10
Official U.S. PlayStation Magazine	N/A	5/5	N/A
Official Xbox Magazine (US)	N/A	N/A	8.2/10
PC Gamer (US)	78%	N/A	N/A
X-Play	N/A	3/5	N/A

The PlayStation 2 and Xbox versions received "favorable" reviews, while the PC version received "average" reviews, according to the review aggregation website Metacritic. GamePro said of the PlayStation 2 and Xbox versions, "Other baseball games might have a more unique feature or two, and several absolutely have better graphics, but only High Heat delivers such consistently riveting gameplay. For the third season in a row, it's the top ballgame on the market." (Note: GamePro gave both console versions each a score of 4/5 for graphics, and two 5/5 scores for control and fun factor. The only difference in the sound category is that the PlayStation 2 version got 4/5, while the Xbox version got 3.5/5.)
