= House of the Dying Sun =

2016 video game

- Developer: Marauder Interactive
- Publisher: Marauder Interactive
- Release: WW: November 2, 2016
- Genre: Space combat
- Mode: Single-player

House of the Dying Sun, formerly Enemy Starfighter, is a space combat game developed and published by Marauder Interactive. It was released on November 2, 2016 for Microsoft Windows and went through Steam's Early Access program prior to its full release. The game features optional virtual reality options that work with the HTC Vive and the Oculus Rift.

The game contains fourteen scenarios that the player is able to complete, with the gameplay consisting of both first-person "cockpit combat" and an overlay in which the player is able to assume control of or give orders to ships in their fleet. The player takes the role of a royal guard seeking vengeance for their murdered emperor.

== Reception ==
Reception

Aggregate score
Aggregator	Score
Metacritic	76/100

Review score
Publication	Score
Game Informer	7.5/10

House of the Dying Sun has received a score of 76/100 on Metacritic based on 4 reviews, indicating "generally favorable" reviews.

Daniel Tack of Game Informer gave the game a score of 7.5/10, praising the gameplay and atmosphere but criticizing the game's short length.

== See also ==
- Star Citizen
