= High Heat Major League Baseball 2002 =

2001 video game

- Developers: Team .366; Möbius Entertainment (GBA)
- Publisher: The 3DO Company
- Series: High Heat Major League Baseball
- Platforms: Microsoft Windows, PlayStation, PlayStation 2, Game Boy Advance
- Release: PlayStation: NA: March 5, 2001; Windows: NA: March 15, 2001; PlayStation 2: NA: March 28, 2001; Game Boy Advance: NA: September 25, 2001; EU: October 5, 2001
- Genre: Sports
- Modes: Single-player, multiplayer

High Heat Major League Baseball 2002, also known as High Heat Baseball 2002, is a video game released in 2001, and is the fourth game in the High Heat Major League Baseball video game series. Then-Montreal Expos right fielder Vladimir Guerrero is featured on the cover. The game was released in March 2001 for Microsoft Windows, PlayStation, and PlayStation 2, followed by a Game Boy Advance port in September 2001. A Game Boy Color version was also in development but was cancelled.

== Reception ==
Reception

Aggregate score
Aggregator	Score			
Aggregator	GBA	PC	PS	PS2
Metacritic	62/100	76/100	66/100	76/100

Review scores
Publication	Score			
Publication	GBA	PC	PS	PS2
Computer Games Strategy Plus	N/A	3.5/5	N/A	N/A
Computer Gaming World	N/A	4/5	N/A	N/A
Electronic Gaming Monthly	7.5/10 (Note: Three critics of Electronic Gaming Monthly gave the Game Boy Advance version each a score of 7.5/10, 8/10, and 7/10.)	N/A	5.33/10 (Note: Three critics of Electronic Gaming Monthly gave the PlayStation version each a score of 8/10, 2.5/10, and 5.5/10.)	7.17/10 (Note: Three critics of Electronic Gaming Monthly gave the PlayStation 2 version each a score of 7/10, 6.5/10, and 8/10.)
EP Daily	N/A	8.5/10	8.5/10	8.5/10
Game Informer	7.5/10	N/A	N/A	7.75/10
GameRevolution	N/A	N/A	B−	B
GameSpot	6/10	7.8/10	5.7/10	6.1/10
GameSpy	82%	80%	N/A	80%
GameZone	9/10	9/10	9.9/10	8.5/10
IGN	4.5/10	7.8/10	7/10	8.5/10
Next Generation	N/A	N/A	N/A	4/5
Nintendo Power	4/5	N/A	N/A	N/A
Official U.S. PlayStation Magazine	N/A	N/A	4/5	4/5
PC Gamer (US)	N/A	85%	N/A	N/A
Maxim	N/A	N/A	N/A	1/5
Playboy	N/A	N/A	N/A	75%

The Windows and PlayStation 2 versions received "generally favorable reviews", while the Game Boy Advance and PlayStation versions received "mixed or average reviews", according to the review aggregation website Metacritic. Nintendo Power gave the Game Boy Advance version a favorable review while it was still in development. Edge gave the same GBA version six out of ten, saying, "While US players can happily debate the pros and cons of team line-up, it's hard to see UK gamers making the same emotional link." Christopher Allen of AllGame gave the Windows version four stars out of five, stating, "With its massive number of statistics, solid gameplay, and avalanche of customization options, High Heat Major League Baseball 2002 is a must have for any baseball fanatic. A wide fan base and multiplayer options will insure the freshness of this title for a long time. Beyond the gnawing irritation of glaring bugs requiring a patch to swat, the game is the closest representation to baseball on the computer as of 2001." Tom Carroll of the same website gave the PlayStation 2 version three stars out of five, saying that it was "not a beautiful game, despite being one of the most complete baseball titles on the market today." Rob Smolka of NextGen called the PlayStation 2 version "a must-buy for all serious PS2 baseball fans." Glenn Rubenstein of Extended Play gave the same console version three stars out of five and said that it was "by no means a poor title, it just lacks the polish and completeness of the other two titles [All-Star Baseball 2002 and Triple Play Baseball]."

Uncle Dust of GamePro compared the PlayStation version to "that off-speed pitcher who wins 15 games a year for your team—you tolerate him as a solid performer, but he's not your favorite player." (Note: GamePro gave the PlayStation version 2/5 for graphics, two 3/5 scores for sound and fun factor, and 4/5 for control.) However, he said of the PlayStation 2 version, "This is one game that is better every time you play and deserves to be taken on a full 162-game season." (Note: GamePro gave the PlayStation 2 version 3/5 for graphics, 3.5/5 for sound, and two 4.5/5 scores for control and fun factor.) However, he also said of the Game Boy Advance version in its early review, "It's sad because High Heat MLB 2002 could've been a terrific game on the GBA, yet its lack of depth, bad soundtrack, and easy difficulty level make the game a minor leaguer." (Note: GamePro gave the Game Boy Advance version 3.5/5 for graphics, 2/5 for sound, 4/5 for control, and 2.5/5 for fun factor in an early review.)

Computer Games Magazine and PC Gamer US both named the PC version the best sports game of 2001, with the latter calling it "the best simulation of any sport." It also won the award for "Best Sports Game for PC" at The Electric Playground's 2001 Blister Awards, and was nominated for the "Best Sports Game" award GameSpot's Best and Worst of 2001 Awards, which went to FIFA 2002.
