= DR Studios =

British video game developer

- Type: Computer game developer
- Industry: Video games
- Founded: 1998; 28 years ago
- Founder: Kevin Buckner; Clive Robert
- Headquarters: Milton Keynes, United Kingdom
- Products: Video games
- Parent: 505 Games
- Website: www.drstudios.co.uk

DR Studios (formerly known as Deep Red Games) is a British video game developer based in Milton Keynes in the United Kingdom. DRS primarily develops strategy games, such as Monopoly Tycoon. The company was formed in 1998 by Kevin Buckner and Clive Robert, and since then they have released more than fifteen games. In 2007, following a management buyout, the company name was changed to DR Studios.

== Titles ==
- Risk II (2000)
- Monopoly Tycoon (2001)
- Beach Life (2002)
- SeaWorld Adventure Parks Tycoon (2003)
- SeaWorld Adventure Parks Tycoon 2 (2005)
- Tycoon City: New York (2006)
- Vegas: Make it Big/Vega$ Tycoon, 'Make it Big' is the European Name & 'Tycoon' for the US (2006)
- Hospital Tycoon (2007)
- High School Dreams: Best Friends Forever (2010)
- Dragons Den (2011)
- Bug Wings (2011)
- My Sea Park (2012)
- iSchool Dreams: First Semester (2012)
- iSchool Dreams: My Valentine (2012)
- Battle Islands (2013)
- Mythic Islands (2014)
- Battle Ages (2016)
- Battle Islands: Commanders (2016)
- Terraria (Mobile) (2019)
- Terraria (Console) (2021)
