= Home Sweet Home (2017 video game) =

2017 survival, horror and puzzle video game

- Developer: Yggdrazil Group
- Publisher: Yggdrazil Group
- Director: Saroot Tubloy
- Producer: Pongtham Nantapan
- Designer: Pongtham Nantapan
- Engine: Unreal Engine 4
- Platforms: Microsoft Windows, PlayStation 4, Xbox One
- Release: Microsoft Windows; September 27, 2017; PlayStation 4, Xbox One; October 16, 2018
- Genre: Survival horror
- Mode: Single-Player

Home Sweet Home is a 2017 survival horror game developed and published by Yggdrazil Group. The game features horror elements drawn from Thai folklore. It is available on Windows, PlayStation 4, Xbox One, and on VR devices.

The main gameplay centers on evading the evil spirits chasing the player while telling the story of the protagonist Tim. After suffering from the disappearance of his wife, Tim found himself waking up in an unfamiliar place and being hunted by the vindictive, evil female spirit. He must survive and find the hidden truth behind the disappearance of his wife and the place that he once believed to be a “home sweet home”.

== Gameplay ==
A central feature of the game concerns stealth and hiding. If the ghosts or demons find the player in their hiding spot, the player can do a quick time event to escape, or will otherwise be killed and the game will respawn to the last save point. Exploration is also important, which is complemented by the fact that many areas have no dangers. Instead, the goal is to find diary pages, informative articles, or puzzle items.

== Plot ==
=== Episode I ===
Chadchai Tubloy (“Tim”) awakens in an unfamiliar building, unsure where his wife Jane is. Searching for her, he encounters a hostile female ghost wielding a boxcutter who can teleport through portals of blood. Escaping, he emerges from a stair cupboard in his own house. The whole thing had seemingly been a nightmare; while Jane had gone missing some time before.

Finding her diary, Tim goes back to the cupboard and he finds himself in a mysterious and dark wooden house mentioned in its pages. There, Tim encounters a colossal, one-eyed Preta. News reports found throughout reveal that the Preta was once Pichai Manapaiboon, the leader of a criminal biker gang who assaulted and robbed his own mother, but died when a steel rod impaled him through his eye during a police chase and was then reborn as a Preta as punishment. Tim attempts to pursue Jane, but they are separated by the Preta. Tim placates it with a food offering and escapes home again, finding it dark, ransacked, and Jane still missing.

Tim is transported to a haunted school via a blood portal where he again encounters the ghost girl. Through notes, it is revealed that the ghost, Belle, was an unstable and isolated student who fell in love with another student named Shane and put a lechery jinx on him to make him fall for her. However, the jinx backfired, killing her and leading Shane to commit suicide, leaving Belle’s ghost doomed to forever look for him. Using a hacksaw to cut through a blocked door and holy water to slow her down, Tim pacifies Belle by getting her to confront her deeds, allowing him to escape the school. Back home, Tim locates a penta-metal (five metal) knife described in Jane’s diary, given to her by a novice monk for protection during the paranormal experiences haunting her.

The game switches to Jane's perspective, as she wanders through an empty house with the knife. She is soon caught by a ghost in traditional dancing garb and dragged away.

=== Episode II ===
Tim awakens in his house, with an eclipse set to occur. Unable to cope with Jane's disappearance, he has been drinking heavily while ignoring calls from his best friend Dew. Blacking out, he wakes up in a dark forest infested with krasue and hostile, zombie-like entities. Tim is chased across a bridge that collapses; he then wakes up in an old music school haunted by Ratri, the traditionally-dressed ghost, who can teleport and attack by possessing dress mannequins. In life, the vain and selfish Ratri made a deal with a spirit to get the lead role in a big performance; but when her honest and hardworking sister Tida got the role instead, Ratri framed her for theft, leading to Tida’s death. Refusing to honor the spirit, Ratri was killed by it and began haunting the school. Tim narrowly succeeds in defeating Ratri with Jane's knife, although Tim passes out from his injuries.

Rescued and healed by the novice monk at a temple, Tim learns that he and Jane are in a limbo-like realm called Hindrance for souls who cannot yet move on. The novice urges Tim to return home and leave Jane, citing that her fate cannot be changed. While chasing Jane again, Tim encounters Chai, an occultist collecting the souls of sinners within the Hindrance (including Tim and Jane) for use in a ritual in conjunction with the eclipse to open the gates of Hell itself and obtain incredible power. Jane's knife proves ineffective and Chai's blind but powerful minion the Executioner cuts off two of Tim's fingers and shatters the knife. At the novice’s instruction, Tim gathers the components needed to reforge it into a more powerful "nona-metal" (nine metal) knife; once completed, the novice warns that it must only be used in self-defense, otherwise it will corrupt him.

Tim goes to confront Chai again but is captured and taken to an underground temple. Escaping, Tim barely manages to evade the Executioner, deafening him with gongs and blasting him with an old cannon. Tim locates Chai and stabs him in the neck, imbuing the knife and Tim's arm with additional power. Entries from Jane’s diary reveal that she had an affair with Dew, after Tim’s overworking and drinking had caused problems between the couple.

In a central chamber, Tim finds the bodies of sinners gathered for Chai’s ritual, including Pichai, Belle, and Ratri. Tim frees and briefly reunites with Jane before Chai, fused into the Executioner's body, attacks and mortally wounds her. Tim defeats him once again and shares one last goodbye with Jane before being forced to flee as the Temple begins to collapse. Chai's disembodied head pursues Tim, but he escapes the Hindrance at last with the novice's assistance. Returning to his house, Tim finally answers a phone call from Dew, appearing overcome with rage as power from the knife surges through him.

== Development ==
=== Concept ===
Home Sweet Home was developed by Thai production house, Yggdrazil Group Public Company Limited The company’s vision is to enhance Thai CGI on an international scale. Saroot Tubloy, game director and the co-founder of Yggdrazil Group has a vision that digital media will become more influential henceforth. He decided to create interactive media apart from the company’s field of profession in VFX and CGI

Therefore, Yggdrazil Group has formed a development team called Ygggame to specifically develop games and improve their expertise separated into 2 subteams by the engine used; Unreal Engine and Unity Engine especially for mobile games.

The horror game was chosen according to the company’s vision to represent Thai culture and create a unique game. Moreover, The development team was formed almost at the same time as the release of Silent Hills: Playable Teaser, giving the inspiration to create a game to be compared equally in terms of graphic quality. Home Sweet Home is also influenced by Clock Tower and Resident Evil.

Saroot said that the advantage of creating a horror game is that it is not necessary to create an embellishment scene, but the challenging part is how to play with the psychology of horror and persuade the player to be emotionally invested in the game. He has to specifically study more psychology to create the game.

At the early stage of development, the director (Mr. Saroot Tubloy) wanted to create a game that simulated the player in a haunted house with a goal to escape by solving puzzles while ghosts try to jump scare the player. However, the development team decided to add a story to make the game more compelling.

Home Sweet Home took more than 2 years to develop and was redeveloped 2 times. From the start, the game has been remodeled 2 times. The first development took 7 to 8 months and was intended for smartphones and tablets, but it was canceled after due to many limitations, mainly its graphic quality. So the PC version was selected instead. The second development took 1 year and 3 months before Home Sweet Home was voted in Steam Greenlight which is the system for users to decide whether the game should be released on Steam or not. The amount of pressure and the complaints from the voters made the development team scrap the existing project again.

The developer wants to bring out Thai ghosts’ uniqueness in horror and disturbing nature. So the gameplay was designed to hide instead of fighting against the ghosts. The developer also made Home Sweet Home available in multiple languages to evaluate Thai games on an international level and to reduce the amount of negative reputation from Thai people which the developer thinks limits the opportunity for Thai games to succeed.

=== Visual and gameplay design ===
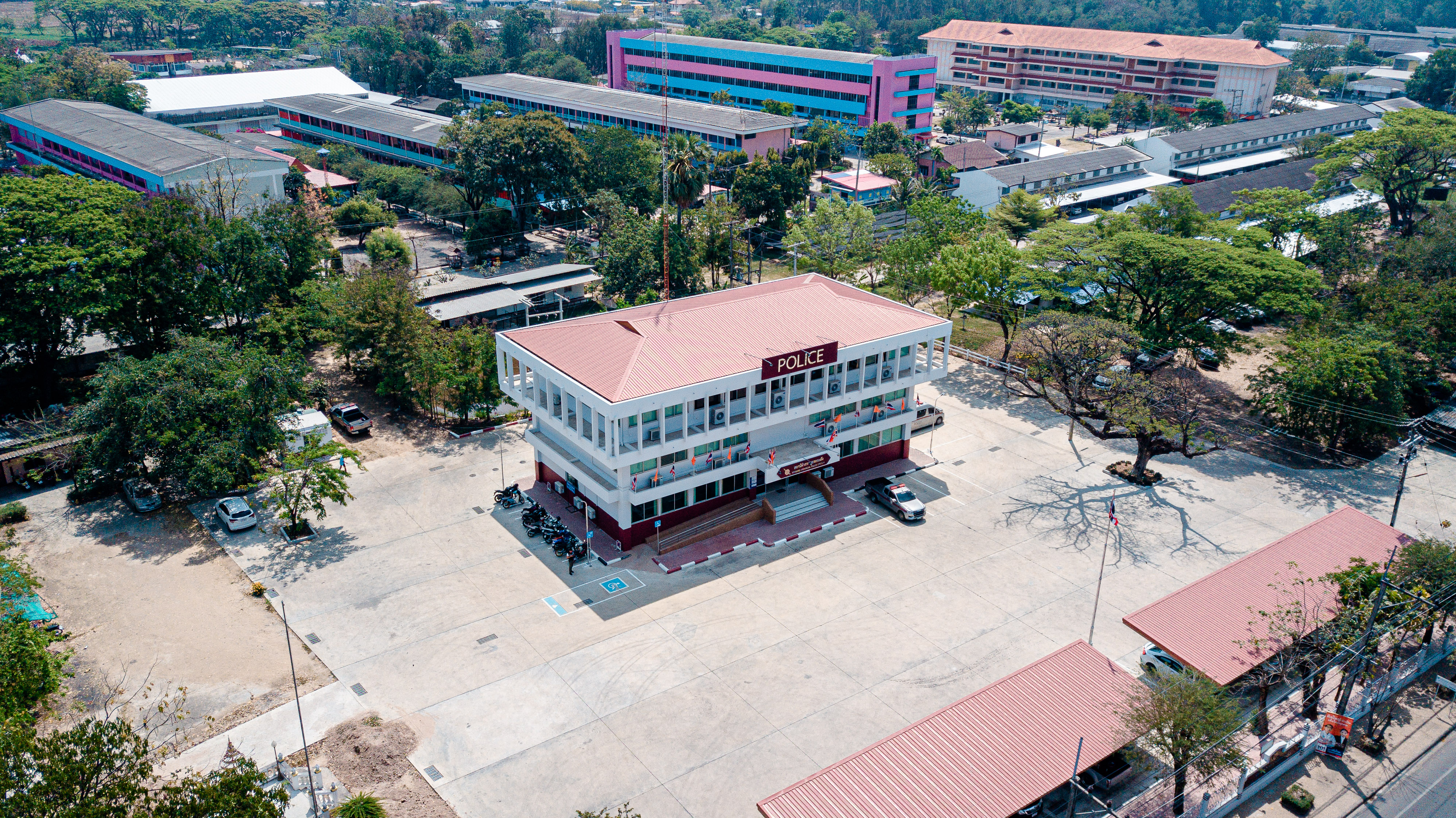
Home Sweet Home's map has a reference from existing Thai Police Station.

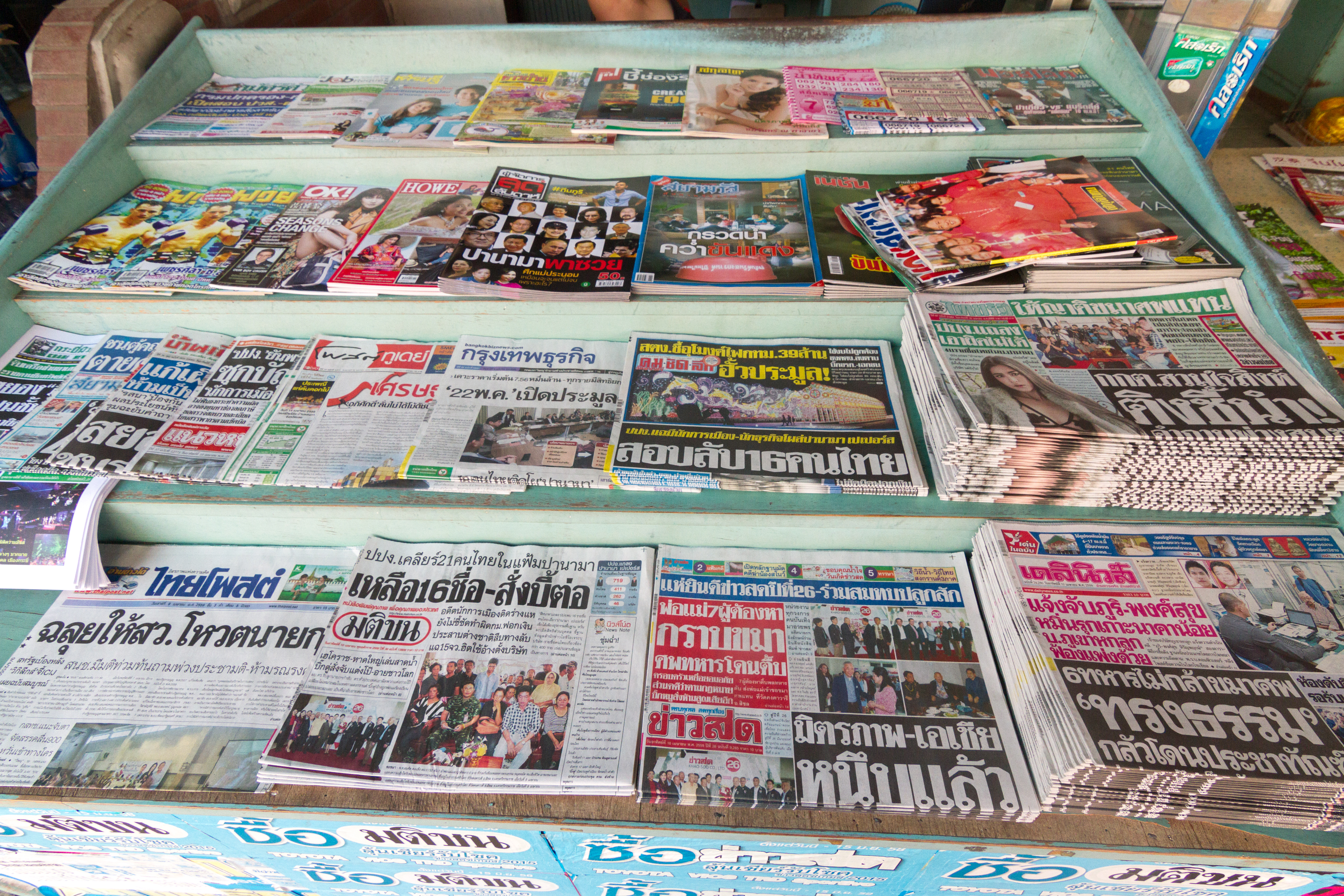
In-game item was designed after existing object such as Thai newspaper.

Home Sweet Home has the inspiration from Resident Evil, Silent Hill, and Clock Tower, which are the origin and inspiration to many horror games.

First Person perspective is chosen by the developer because it gives the immersion of the main character to maximize the fear and scariness. The developer also blurs pictures within the game that include playable characters to make players immersed in the game.

The location in the Home Sweet Home takes inspiration from real places, for example, King Mongkut's Institute of Technology Ladkrabang. faculty of the art building and Kasetsart University Building. Many characters in Home Sweet Home were inspired by real things such as Phee- Naang-Ram which was based on the story of the bathroom shrine at King Mongkut's Institute of Technology Ladkrabang.

The developer chose Unreal Engine 4 as the game engine which has a big overhaul from the last version. Unreal Engine 4 improves the editor to make it easier to use. Furthermore, the lighting engine has been upgraded to match the 2014 graphic standard with lower graphic cost and improve building speed which speed up the process.

=== Development team ===
Roles	Member	Ref.
Game Director	Saroot Tubloy	
Concept Artist	Kittichai Reaungchaichan	
Concept Artist	Krisda Taimsuwan	
3D Modeler	Antiwitcheirz Zethenytthe	
3D Modeler	Kawin Paopooree	
3D Modeler	Theerasak Nathasiri	
3D Modeler	Kreinkrai Sangpet	
3D Modeler	Sekson Keawpaitoon	
3D Modeler	Suebmongkol Thongnark	
3D Modeler	Supachock Nuamthong	
Game Designer	Pongtham Nantapan	
Producer	Pongtham Nantapan	
Unreal Engine Developer	Chutpisit Spawasu	
Unreal Engine Developer	Rati Wattanakornprasit	
Unreal Engine Developer	Thanut Panichyotai	
Unreal Engine Developer	Bood Atsatarakun	
Technical Artist	Nattapol Yodjit	
Technical Artist	Anucha Tuntiyawongsa	
Technical Artist	Sathit Limumpaimat	
Technical Artist	Nutawut Yamee	
Animator	Thanadej Seehawong	
Animator	Anocha Samrongsap	
Sound and Music Composer	Puripat Sutthidee	
Foley Artist	Puripat Sutthidee	
Game Marketing	Tunyatorn Sangpunyaruk	

== Promotion and release ==
On 1 May 2016, Yggdrazil Group released the “Home Sweet Home | Official Trailer” video on YouTube YGG Games channel to promote the poll, Steam Greenlight. The Trailer revealed the first ghost. The trailer also revealed the house and school which are the location within the game. Home Sweet Home received a positive reputation in the trailer comment section from the community including YouTubers. On 12 May 2016, Home Sweet Home announced on Steam Greenlight for voting. Home Sweet Home passed the vote from Steam Greenlight. 1 day Before the Home Sweet Home Demo release, On 17 November 2016, YggGame's Facebook page and developer page announced the event about guessing the story from 3 posters related to Home Sweet Home including “The Thai Traditional Dancer', “The University Girl'' and “A Lovely House” Posters, the winner also receives award. On 18 November 2016, the Home Sweet Home Demo was announced and released on the Facebook page. The demo has been played by the community including the YouTuber. Home Sweet Home's Facebook page announced the reward from the poster event. The event finished on 15 December 2016 and announced the winner on 16 December 2016. Home Sweet Home also released Home Sweet Home wallpapers on the Facebook page. On 30 June 2017, Facebook Home Sweet Home: Game posted a “Home Sweet Home Game Official Trailer 2017” video with a promotional post that revealed the release of Home Sweet Home in September 2017. On 1 July 2017, Facebook Home Sweet Home: Game posted the released date poster containing number 9 as Home Sweet Home will be released in September, and released a PC demo of Home Sweet Home on Steam. After the demo promotion YggGame Facebook page revealed the concept art on the Facebook page and Instagram. On 13 September 2017, the Home Sweet Home Facebook page announced the official release date for Home Sweet Home which is 27 September 2017 the poster contains the release date and platform available, also giveaway free Home Sweet Home copy for sharing this post. On 24 August 2018, Yggdrasil cooperated with Mastiff Publisher to make an announcement post on the Home Sweet Home: Game Facebook page about porting Home Sweet Home into PS4, Xbox, and Nintendo Switch versions. Home Sweet Home PlayStation 4, PlayStation VR, and Xbox versions were released in America on 16 October 2018 and in Other countries on 5 July 2019.

=== Demo ===
The game demo was released on 16 November 2016 and released on Steam on 1 July 2017 for PC, earning an enthusiastic response. In the demo, the player plays as protagonist Chadchai Tubloy (Tim) who suddenly awakens in an unknown place. The player is occasionally chased by a ghost girl with a boxcutter who can teleport through portals of blood. The player explores the environment using stealth and solves some puzzles. The level ends when a shelf blocks the exit, followed by the aforementioned ghost girl providing a jump scare.

== Reception ==
=== Sales ===
On 30 September 2019, Both Home Sweet Home Episode 1 and Home Sweet Home Episode 2 reached the top selling on Steam with Home Sweet Home Episode 1 at 7th Place and Home Sweet Home Episode 2 at first place. According to MGR Online, the Home Sweet Home franchise has sold more than 1 million copies. Brand Inside, the Marketing website, shows that the Home Sweet Home Franchise has generated an income of 55.6 million baht in 2018 a total of 33%, 47.9 million baht in 2019 a total of 25%, and 17 million baht in 2020 a total of 7.5%.

=== Critical reviews ===
According to the Steam review, players find it mostly positive about the game. Many players say that the game includes Thai lore and Thai uniqueness and enhances the intensity within the game well and some say it was too scary for them. They mention the location within the game felt similar to the real place and immerse them. However, some players did not like the game. They mention that the game has large performance issues, poor enemy AI design, a game length that is too short for them, and mistakes in the game that frustrate them.

The opinion of the reviewer is also mostly positive. Beartai, OnlineStation, and ExtremeIT mention that the game creates a phenomenal visual that keeps scaring them until the end of the game. The theme in this game according to Beartai, he says that using the location that is usually used in a horror game and creating the dreadful out of it makes him terrify to go to that location especially University in the game. Beartai also mentions that the fact that this game is in first-person perspective, great voice dialogue, and interaction within the game make him immersed in the character that he is playing. Beartai also mentions the story that keeps lore and mystery making it fun to discover in the game. For the Gameplay, ExtremeIT, and Beartai mention that the control is very smooth and perfect for stealth gameplay. They say the game mostly focuses on stealth elements which make already scary enemies become more terrifying when the player must hide from them. Online Station says about the gameplay that the puzzle that prevents the player from progressing through is well designed. They say that the puzzle is not too rough or too easy to solve and increases the depth of the gameplay. However, Beartai, OnlineStation, and ExtremeIT mention the cons which is the performance issue. Beartai mentioned that the game used too much graphic cost and he got a constant lag spike. ExtremeIT and OnlineStation have similar opinions but they complain about long loading times when progressing into new sections. ExtremeIT mentions that this problem is common for this game engine but it should not take this long. Moreover, the reviewer finds the same problem as players' enemy AI is too easy to evade. Beartai mentions that after he escapes from the enemy's grasp and hides in the locker beside the enemy, the enemy ignores him. Also, the checkpoint system Beartai says that it often makes the game impossible to progress through and frustrates him.

The international reviewer Blooddisgusting, mentions that Home Sweet Home uses multiple layers of horror to scare the player with an unusual location for the game, reach the player's nerve, and create a dreadful experience. However, he mentioned that the game broke badly which ruined many experiences that he should have had. Also, the gameplay, despite the fantastic opening, is linear and repetitive for him.

Review scores
Blooddisgusting	3/5
Beartai	7.5/10
ExtremeIT	7/10
OnlineStation	9.0

=== Awards and ceremony ===
The game made by Thai developers, Home Sweet Home, has been nominated for 5 awards at the “Development Award 2017” which is” Best Desktop / Downloadable”, “Best Hardcore Game”, “Most Promising IP”, “Best Story / Storytelling” and “Best Quality of Art” at the global game competition stage at Game Connection America 2017. Yggdrasil has sent Home Sweet Home to showcase at the Cannes Film Festival between May 16 to 24, to create the way for further business expansion. Yggdrazil Group and Ygggame, the developer team of Home Sweet Home, got the award in IP Champion 2019, in the category of excellent copyright Yggdrazil Group was generally chosen as 1 of 5 representatives from Thailand who were able to showcase their games here in Japan, Tokyo Game Show 2016 on 17–18 September 2016, with Yggdrazil Group bringing a total of 2 games which is Home Sweet Home on Steam, play games via HTC Vive and Project No.5 on Gear VR.

Year	Ceremony	Category	Result	Ref.
2016	Tokyo Game Show 2016	Showcase	Participated	
2017	Development Award 2017	Best Desktop / Downloadable	Nominated	
2017	Development Award 2017	Best Hardcore game	Nominated	
2017	Development Award 2017	Most promising IP	Nominated	
2017	Development Award 2017	Best Story / Storytelling	Nominated	
2017	Development Award 2017	Best Quality of Art	Nominated	
2019	IP Champion 2019	Excellent copyright	WON	
2023	Cannes Film Festival	Showcase	Participated	

== Legacy ==
=== Sequels and spin-offs ===
Home Sweet Home 2 was released on PC on September 25, 2019, and is available on Steam. Saroot said in the interview that Home Sweet Home episode 2 was not intended to be the sequel of the first episode, it was originally in the same episode. However, it was forced to be separated into two parts owing to the deficient development budget. Afterward, Yggdrazil Group signed a contract with Ningbo Inception Media, aiming for China's games market. With the increasing resources, Yggdrazil Group has extended their development team for Home Sweet Home episode 2 and improved the game in many aspects.

In this episode, Tim's relentless quest to locate his missing wife remains unfruitful. His journey commences with an awakening within an enigmatic jungle, driven by an irresistible urge to explore his baffling new environment. However, his exploration quickly turns perilous as he encounters local inhabitants influenced by a malevolent spirit, in addition to a cryptic and seemingly imperceptible Thai Dancer. As he continues through the forest and its surrounding areas, he becomes the target of unrelenting pursuit, necessitating not only his survival amidst pervasive malevolence but also his ability to assemble the fragmented clues required to reunite with his lost wife.

Aside from the improving intenseness of the storyline and graphic quality, the development team also added more features to the gameplay. The player can fight back the evil spirit with the weapon in the inventory instead of only hiding and avoiding mechanisms.

Home Sweet Home: Survive was released on PC on February 8, 2021 with the completely different gameplay from Home Sweet Home episode one and two. It is a multiplayer asymmetrical game where one individual, known as the warden, must track down and capture four visitors within an enclosed arena. The specific roles assumed by players in this game give rise to two primary gameplay modes.

The warden's objective is to strategically pursue the four visitors, ensuring that none of them escape or fall victim to the visitors' lethal actions. Each warden possesses distinctive statistics and special abilities, enabling them to employ various methods in their pursuit of the visitors.

Conversely, the visitors must collaborate in their pursuit of a common objective. Each character boasts a diverse set of attributes and skills tailored to distinct roles within the game, such as decoy, damage-dealer, or ritual performer. The dynamics of the game undergo a significant shift upon the fulfillment of their collective goal. Players will find themselves faced with a critical decision: either join forces to eliminate the warden or opt for self-preservation by making an escape from the arena.

Home Sweet Home: Survive is a new game that was developed to maintain the revenue in the game section of YggDrazil Group. It is still in development and has many updates, with a collaboration with Thai government organizations and others such as vtuber, YouTubers, and brands.

Home Sweet Home: Online was released on PC on June 22, 2023. In this version, the player engages in the fresh Multiplayer Online Battle Mode introduced by the creators of the Home Sweet Home franchise. Secure victory by gathering souls in a 4v4 battle, during which the individual possessing the Warden Soul undergoes a transformation into a Warden, tasked with seeking out the opposing team's visitor. Meanwhile, the other visitors must combat to survive and minimize their casualties. In the clash between the two factions, only one side can emerge as the ultimate victor.

=== Cultural influence ===
YouTube Channel name Cosbit creates Home Sweet Home in the real-life title “ถ้า Home Sweet Home อยู่ในชีวิตจริง (ผีเบลน่ากลัวเหมือนในเกมมาก!!)”. The video is about escaping from a university girl ghost which is an enemy in the game.
