= Yggdrazil Group =

Thai computer graphics company

Yggdrazil Group Public Company Limited is a Thai computer graphics company providing services in film visual effects and animation, and as a video game developer. The studio was established in 2006 by Tanat Juwiwat and Saroot Tubloy, and was registered as a limited company in 2009. They initially focused on visual effects services for television advertisements, and later expanded into film animation, and video game development with the 2017 horror video game Home Sweet Home. The company was publicly listed on the Market for Alternative Investment in 2020.

Yggdrazil Group is Thailand's second-largest computer graphics company by earnings, reported at 173.54 million baht (US$5.38 M) in 2018, with around two-thirds of its clients being international. Its filmography includes the 2018 Thai film Homestay, for which it won the Suphannahong National Film Award for Best Visual Effects, the 2019 Netflix series The Stranded, and the 2019 Chinese animated film Ne Zha.
