= Virtual Bart =

1994 video game

- North American Genesis box art
- Developer: Sculptured Software
- Publisher: Acclaim Entertainment
- Director: Hal Rushton
- Producer: Mark Flitman
- Designers: Hal Rushton; Rich Reagan; David J. Ross
- Programmers: James Michael Henn; Rob Nelson; Hung Nguyen; John Tomlinson
- Artists: Rich Reagan; Joel Izatt; Mike Peery; Ray Cornia; Michael Ulrich; Virginia Sargent; Rob Kemp
- Composers: Sam Powell; Mark Ganus; Kingsley Thurbur; Eric Nunamaker; James Hebdon
- Series: The Simpsons
- Platforms: Super Nintendo Entertainment System; Sega Genesis
- Release: September 23, 1994: Super Nintendo; NA: September 23, 1994; EU: 1994 Genesis; NA: September 23, 1994; EU: 1994
- Genre: Action
- Mode: Single-player

Virtual Bart is a 1994 action video game developed by Sculptured Software and published by Acclaim Entertainment. It was released for the Super Nintendo Entertainment System (SNES) and Sega Genesis in September 1994. It is based on the American animated television series The Simpsons, and has players control Bart Simpson through a selection of six minigames based around various themes. It is the final Simpsons game to star Bart Simpson, as well as the final Simpsons game released for the Genesis.

Virtual Bart was conceived as a follow-up to The Simpsons: Bart's Nightmare (1992), with Mark Flitman as producer. The game received generally mixed reviews from critics upon release. Reviewers criticized the game for its high difficulty, controls, and lack of polish, though praised the gameplay variety, graphics, and overall presentation. Retrospective reviews have been more critical, with it often being ranked as among the worst Simpsons games.

== Gameplay ==
Bart motors through the ruins of Springfield in the "Doomsday Bart" level of the Genesis version.

Virtual Bart consists of several minigames, similar to Bart's Nightmare. Unlike Bart's Nightmare, the game does not feature a hub world and each stage is selected randomly using a spinning roulette wheel, though it also features a Practice Mode that allows the player to pick one of the levels. Gameplay for Jurassic Bart, Baby Bart, and Pig Bart consists of platforming, while Class Picture, Mount Splashmore, and Doomsday Bart consist of different play styles.

All stages feature a time limit. If the time runs out, the player loses a life. Additionally, all stages except for Class Picture feature a health bar, which decreases every time Bart gets hit. Several stages feature corn dogs that restore Bart's health, as well as extra lives.

Once a stage is completed, it cannot be repeated; if the wheel lands on an already-completed stage, it will continue spinning slowly to the nearest remaining stage panel. If the wheel lands on the skull or corn dog panel (which quickly alternates between showing each item), the player will lose or gain a life, respectively. If the player fails a stage, they lose one life and are taken back to the roulette wheel. Failure when the player has no extra lives prematurely ends the game. Otherwise, the game ends after all stages are cleared.

The game consists of six different stages:

- Jurassic Bart: Bart is a dinosaur and runs across a primitive Springfield, and rampages throughout mountains while defeating several primitive humans that resemble Simpsons characters. Bart attacks with his tail and can roar, defeating all enemies on screen after picking up certain items.
- Baby Bart: A baby Bart follows a moving ice cream truck by escaping his home and swings his way out of his home, ending up in his local street way, and eventually a circus. Bart can use his diaper as a parachute to slow his fall while airborne, and can use his pacifier as a projectile.
- Pork Factory Pig Bart: Bart is a pig who has been captured and taken to Krusty's Pork Factory, but manages to escape, and sets off to free the captured pigs. Bart can only walk and jump, and must switch levers to free captured pigs.
- Virtual Class Picture: Bart intends to ruin his school's picture day shooting by throwing tomatoes at all of his classmates. After he succeeds, the school schedules a reshoot, which Bart intends to ruin by throwing eggs at his classmates. Bart must throw tomatoes and eggs at his classmates in a 3D field. Bart has a limited number of projectiles, and if he runs out of tomatoes or eggs, or if any adult characters are hit, the player fails the stage. There are two rounds.
- Mount Splashmore: Bart enters the Mount Splashmore water slide and must make it down safely. The stage is played from a forward-facing view, centered behind Bart. Bart must avoid obstacles and make it down to the end of the slide before time runs out. There are several forks in the slide's path. Choosing the wrong path either leads to a stuck Homer, which wastes time and sends Bart back up to the fork; or to an early exit that instantly kills him. Several power-ups appear, such as a clock that adds extra time and a surfboard that grants temporary invulnerability.
- Doomsday Bart: An explosion at the Springfield Nuclear Power Plant causes Springfield to become an apocalyptic wasteland. Bart must make his way to the Springfield entrance on his motorcycle while avoiding Jimbo and Kearney. The level plays in a 3D view, where Bart drives along a road while avoiding the two bullies' attacks. Bart can attack and can speed up his motorcycle. Passing a checkpoint extends time.

== Plot ==
At a science fair, Martin Prince presents a virtual reality device that displays six educational exhibitions. However, Bart causes the device to malfunction and gets trapped in it. Bart must complete the six programs to escape the machine.

If Bart successfully completes every stage, he escapes from the device and Homer then enters the machine. If the player gets a Game Over, Bart is released from the machine, looking ill.

== Development and release ==
Virtual Bart was developed by Sculptured Software, with Mark Flitman as producer. Flitman had previously served as an associate producer on The Simpsons: Bart's House of Weirdness, released by Konami in 1992 for DOS computers. Virtual Bart was conceived as a follow up to Bart's Nightmare, and at one point had the working title of Bart's Worst Nightmare. Virtual Bart features various digitised audio clips of Dan Castellaneta (as Homer) and Nancy Cartwright (as Bart); additional voice clips of Dan Castellaneta as Groundskeeper Willie were recorded, but went unused.

Originally, Virtual Bart was going to be developed in stereoscopy using technology similar to Valiant Comics (which Acclaim had purchased in 1994), but financial and eye strain concerns led to the idea being scrapped midway through production.

Virtual Bart was released for the Super Nintendo Entertainment System and Sega Genesis on September 23, 1994, in North America. Virtual Bart and The Itchy & Scratchy Game (1995) were the only Simpsons games not published for Sega systems under the Flying Edge division, as Acclaim had dropped the label months earlier. Flitman recalls that Matt Groening disliked the goofy premise, and only allowed Virtual Bart's release due to financial obligations.

== Reception ==
Reception

Review scores
Publication	Score	
Publication	Sega Genesis	SNES
Electronic Gaming Monthly		7/10, 5/10, 4/10, 4/10, 4/10
Famitsu		6/10, 7/10, 7/10, 7/10
GamePro	16/20	17/20
Hyper	60%	
M! Games	67%	67%
Total!		39/100
Electronic Games		B+
Super Gamer		78/100

Electronic Gaming Monthly said the whole game felt rushed during development and that the control was awful, describing the dinosaur-themed stage as being particularly poor.

Reviewing the Genesis port, GamePro praised it as being "[virtually] identical" to the SNES original. They commented of the game itself that "The humorous variations on Bart, different game play (including behind-the-Bart racing and a shooter level), and cameos of Simpsons nitwits all combine to keep the action intriguing and funny."

Retrospective reviews on Virtual Bart have been more negative. GamesRadar ranked Virtual Bart at 17th place in their ranking of Simpsons games, writing "The game is predictably underwhelming, but at least looks pretty decent. Well, it does on SNES, where Mode 7 allowed for loads of cool rotation and pseudo-3D effects." Nintendo Life listed it as the second worst Simpsons game ahead of Bartman Meets Radioactive Man (1992), believing it had good concepts that were ruined by its controls, whereas 1UP.com editor Bob Mackey was critical of the game, saying "Bart's Nightmare isn't a great game, but it's friggin' Super Mario Bros. when compared to its sorta-sequel," and calling it the worst Simpsons game he had played up to that point.
