= List of The Simpsons video games =

List of video games based on The Simpsons

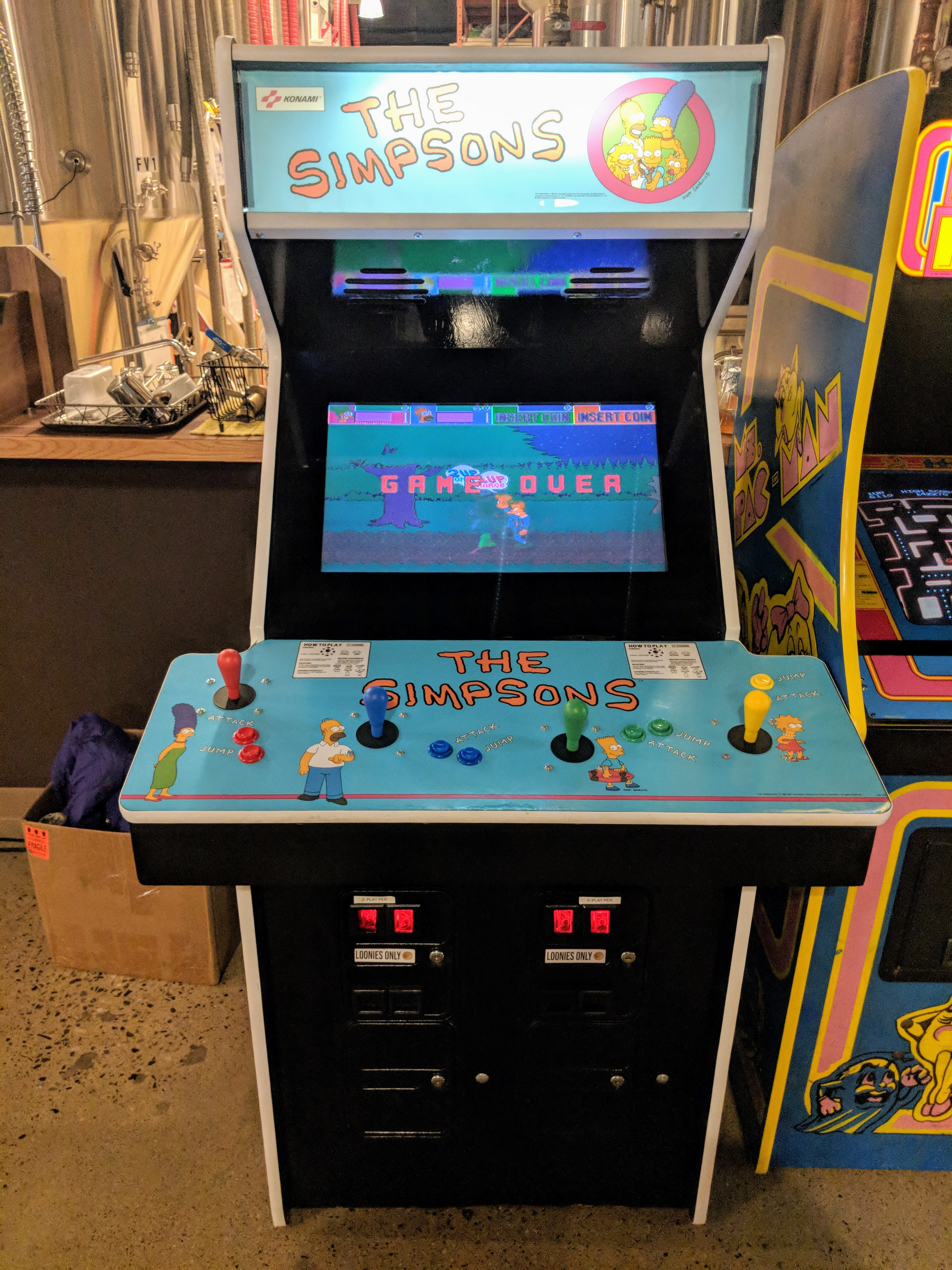
Arcade cabinet for The Simpsons, the franchise's second video game adaptation.

The Simpsons is an American animated television sitcom created by Matt Groening for the Fox Broadcasting Company. The series is a satirical parody of a middle class American lifestyle epitomized by its eponymous family, which consists of Homer, Marge, Bart, Lisa and Maggie. It is set in the fictional town of Springfield and lampoons American culture, society and television and many aspects of the human condition. The family was conceived by Groening shortly before a pitch for a series of animated shorts with producer James L. Brooks. Groening created a dysfunctional family and named the characters after members of his own family, substituting Bart for his own name. The shorts became a part of The Tracey Ullman Show on April 19, 1987, and after a three-season run, the sketch was developed into a half-hour prime time show and became a hit series for Fox. The growing popularity of the series motivated video game developers to create video games based on the series. Two pinball machines have also been produced; one self-titled, that was only made available for a limited time after the first season finale (1990) and The Simpsons Pinball Party (2003). Additionally, several handheld device games have been released, such as Bartman: Avenger of Evil (1990) and Bart Simpson's Cupcake Crisis (1991).

Video games based on the series started with The Simpsons arcade video game in 1991, developed and published Konami. Bart vs. the Space Mutants (1991), developed by Imagineering, expanded the franchise into new platforms, including the Amstrad CPC, NES and Master System. Over the next few years, the franchise would continue to expand, releasing system-exclusive games, such as the PC's Cartoon Studio (1996) and the PlayStation's The Simpsons Wrestling (2001). The release of The Simpsons Game (2007), developed by EA Redwood Shores (Visceral Games), further expanded the franchise, appearing on new platforms including the Wii, Xbox 360 and PlayStation 3. Due to the series' longevity, The Simpsons video games have also spanned many genres, such as the puzzle game Krusty's Fun House (1992), the sports game Itchy & Scratchy in Miniature Golf Madness (1994) and racing game Road Rage (2001). The Simpsons is also one of the franchises spotlighted in the toys-to-life video game Lego Dimensions (2015). Characters and locations from the show were added to Fortnite Battle Royale (2017) in Chapter 6: Mini Season 2.

== Video games ==
As of October 2020, 27 video games focused on The Simpsons series have been released. The following table showcases the correspondent title, release date, publisher, developer and the platforms on which each game was released along with any other relevant information. A detailed overview of each game can be found in their corresponding articles, with the exception of games without articles, which instead have a brief overview in a footnote.

List of The Simpsons video games
Title	Release details	Platform(s)				
Title	Release details	Microsoft	Nintendo	Sega	Sony	Other
Bart vs. the Space Mutants	Released: February, 1991 (NES); Publishers: Acclaim Entertainment, Ocean Software; Developer: Imagineering		NES	Game Gear; Genesis; Master System		Amiga; Atari ST; Amstrad CPC; Commodore 64; IBM PC; ZX Spectrum
The Simpsons	Released: March, 1991 (Arcade); Publisher: Konami; Developer: Konami	XBLM			PSN	Arcade; IBM PC; Commodore 64
Bart Simpson's Escape from Camp Deadly	Released: November, 1991; Publisher: Acclaim Entertainment; Developer: Imagineering		Game Boy			
Bart vs. the World	Released: November 1991 (NES); Publisher: Acclaim Entertainment, Virgin Interactive Entertainment; Developer: Imagineering		NES	Game Gear; Master System		Amiga; Atari ST
Bart's House of Weirdness	Released: January 1, 1992; Publisher: Konami; Developer: Distinctive					IBM PC
Krusty's Fun House (Note: Krusty's Fun House was released on the Super NES and Genesis as Krusty's Super Fun House.)	Released: May 1992 (NES); Publishers: Acclaim Entertainment, Virgin Games; Developer: Audiogenic		Game Boy; NES; Super NES	Game Gear; Genesis; Master System		Amiga; IBM PC
Bart vs. the Juggernauts	Released: September 1992; Publisher: Acclaim Entertainment; Developer: Imagineering		Game Boy			
Bart's Nightmare	Released: October 1992 (Super NES); Publishers: Acclaim Entertainment; Developer: Sculptured Software		Super NES	Genesis		
Bartman Meets Radioactive Man	Released: December 1992 (NES); Publishers: Acclaim Entertainment; Developer: Imagineering		NES	Game Gear		
Bart & the Beanstalk	Released: February 1994; Publisher: Acclaim Entertainment; Developer: Software Creations		Game Boy			
Virtual Bart	Released: September 30, 1994 (Super NES); Publisher: Acclaim Entertainment; Developer: Sculptured Software		Super NES	Genesis		
Itchy & Scratchy in Miniature Golf Madness	Released: November 1994; Publisher: Acclaim Entertainment; Developer: Beam Software		Game Boy			
The Itchy & Scratchy Game	Released: 1995 (Super NES); Publisher: Acclaim Entertainment; Developer: Bits		Super NES	Game Gear; Genesis (Note: The Sega Genesis version went unreleased.)		
The Simpsons: Cartoon Studio	Released: 1996; Publisher: Fox Interactive; Developer: Big Top	Windows				Mac
Virtual Springfield	Released: 1997; Publisher: Fox Interactive; Developer: Digital Evolution	Windows				Mac
The Simpsons Bowling (Note: The Simpsons Bowling is a 3-D trackball arcade game in which the player controls one of eight different bowlers (Homer, Marge, Bart, Lisa, Mr. Burns, Apu, Krusty the Klown and Groundskeeper Willie), all of which have different strengths and weaknesses.)	Released: 2000; Publisher: Konami; Developer: Konami					Arcade
Night of the Living Treehouse of Horror	Released: March 21, 2001; Publisher: THQ; Developer: Software Creations		GB Color			
The Simpsons Wrestling	Released: April 3, 2001; Publishers: Activision (NA) Electronic Arts (EU); Developer: Big Ape				PlayStation	
The Simpsons: Road Rage	Released: November 20, 2001 (PS2); Publisher: Electronic Arts; Developer: Radical Entertainment	Xbox	GameCube		PS2	
The Simpsons Skateboarding	Released: November 12, 2002; Publisher: Electronic Arts; Developer: The Code Monkeys				PS2	
Road Rage	Released: June 30, 2003; Publisher: THQ; Developer: Altron Corporation		GBA			
Hit & Run	Released: September 16, 2003; Publishers: Vivendi Universal Games; Developer: Radical	Windows; Xbox	GameCube		PS2	
The Simpsons Game	Released: October 30, 2007; Publisher: Electronic Arts; Developers: EA Redwood Shores, Rebellion Developments	Xbox 360	Wii; Nintendo DS		PS2; PS3; PSP	
Minutes to Meltdown (Note: Minutes to Meltdown is a pseudo-3D action game in which the player controls Homer as he races to the Springfield Nuclear Power Plant to prevent a nuclear meltdown. The game is thirty minutes long (the player must get Homer to the power plant in that time) and has three levels (one at the Simpson's home, one on the streets of Springfield, and one at the plant).)	Released: 2007; Publisher: EA Mobile; Developer: G5 Entertainment					Mobile
Itchy and Scratchy Land (Note: Itchy and Scratchy Land is an action game in which the player controls either Homer, Bart, Lisa or Marge as they go through Explosion Land, Unnecessary Surgery Land, Torture Land and Searing Gas Pain Land at the amusement park Itchy & Scratchy Land.)	Released: 2009; Publisher: EA Mobile; Developer: EA Mobile					Mobile
The Simpsons Arcade (Note: The Simpsons Arcade (2009) is a re-imagining of the original The Simpsons Arcade Game (1991).)	Released: December 9, 2009 (J2ME); Publisher: EA Mobile; Developer: IronMonkey					iOS; J2ME
Tapped Out	Released: February 27, 2012 (iOS), February 6, 2013 (Android), June 24, 2013 (Kindle); Publisher: EA Mobile; Developer: EA Mobile					iOS; Android; Kindle
The Simpsons Soccer (Note: The Simpsons Soccer is an arcade soccer game where players must kick an actual ball past Homer into the goal as many times as they can.)	Released: 2012; Publisher: Coastal Amusements Inc.; Developer: Coastal Amusements Inc.					Arcade
The Simpsons Arcade (Note: The Simpsons Arcade The Simpsons™ Arcade Machine Bundle available directly from Arcade1Up includes a riser, light-up marquee, stool, and tin wall sign. Live WiFi enabled with no monthly subscription required.)	Released: August 16, 2021 (Arcade1Up Stand-Up); Publisher: Arcade1Up; Developer: Arcade1Up					Arcade1Up Stand-Up

== See also ==
- List of video game franchises
