= The Simpsons: Bart vs. The Juggernauts =

1992 video game

The Simpsons: Bart vs. the Juggernauts
- European cover art
- Developer: Imagineering
- Publisher: Acclaim Entertainment
- Designers: Dan Kitchen; Barry Marx
- Programmers: Bill Jannott; Tom Heidt (additional programming)
- Artist: Bill Jannott
- Composer: Mark Van Hecke
- Series: The Simpsons
- Platform: Game Boy
- Release: NA: September 1992; EU: 1992
- Genres: Action, platform
- Mode: Single-player

The Simpsons: Bart vs. the Juggernauts is a 1992 action-platform game developed by Imagineering and published by Acclaim Entertainment for the Game Boy. It stars Bart from The Simpsons in a game show based on American Gladiators, in which he has to compete in challenges to earn money. Critics gave Bart vs. the Juggernauts average reviews.

== Plot and gameplay ==
In The Simpsons: Bart vs. the Juggernauts, the player controls Bart Simpson from the animated television series The Simpsons. He is participating in a weekly game show called Juggernauts USA, based on the television program American Gladiators, in which he has to run through obstacle courses, battle huge muscle-bound "juggernauts", and do various other challenges. There are a total of seven challenges that change from week to week. To make it onto the next week's episode of Juggernauts USA and avoid being eliminated, Bart must collect a certain amount of money from the challenges.

Each of the four levels of Bart vs. the Juggernauts are made up of an episode of the game show Juggernauts USA. Every challenge is based on a character from The Simpsons. For example, there is one challenge in which Bart has to run an obstacle course in Apu's Kwik-E-Mart store. Another one is Dr. Marvin Monroe's "Hop, Skip and Fry", in which Bart jumps on a floor of tiles that randomly shifts from being safe to electrifying. The others include basketball, skateboarding, a juggernaut fighting match, and a match of shoving at Moe's Tavern. The characters Kent Brockman and Marvin Monroe are the game show's commentators; after the completion of a challenge they comment on Bart's performance.

== Development and release ==
The game was developed by Imagineering and published by Acclaim. It was released in 1992 for the handheld console Game Boy.

== Reception ==
Reception

Review scores
Publication	Score
Computer and Video Games	74/100
GameZone	70/100
HobbyConsolas	81/100
Joystick	74%
Nintendo Power	13.4/20
Total!	45%
N-Force	74%
Rocky Mountain News	B-

Bart vs. the Juggernauts received average reviews from critics. UGO Networks commented that the game is "actually a pretty original idea with some decent gameplay and mix of genres — easily one of the better Simpsons Game Boy adventures," concluding that "it was all right; nothing stellar, but good enough." Matt Williamson of Rocky Mountain News gave it a B− grade, commenting: "a hysterical sendup of the American Gladiators. Nice action sequences."

In 2009, 1UP.com editor Bob Mackey reviewed the game in 1UP's official Retro Gaming Blog. He wrote that "Some of the events—out of seven total—are actually pretty entertaining; Dr. Marvin Monroe's Hop, Skip and Fry [...] could actually be updated for a more fleshed-out Xbox Live Arcade game. But the fighting-based mini-games throw a wrench in the works by leaving too much entirely up to chance and the limited controls of the Game Boy [...]. In what may be one of its few saving graces, Juggernauts unexpectedly captures a little of the Simpsons' written humor with its post-game commentary by Kent Brockman and Dr. Marvin Monroe. I wasn't exactly crying with laughter, but I actually got a few chuckles out of Monroe's psychobabble overanalysis of Bart's performance."
