= The Simpsons: Itchy & Scratchy in Miniature Golf Madness =

1994 video game

Itchy & Scratchy in Miniature Golf Madness
- North American cover art
- Developer: Beam Software
- Publisher: Acclaim Entertainment
- Producers: Alfred Milgrom; Robert Leingang
- Designer: James Halprin
- Programmer: David Theodore
- Artist: Darren Hanna
- Composer: Marshall Parker
- Series: Itchy & Scratchy
- Platform: Game Boy
- Release: NA: November 1994; EU: 1994
- Genre: Traditional sports platform
- Mode: Single-player

Itchy & Scratchy in Miniature Golf Madness is a side-scrolling action platform game and miniature golf game released on the Game Boy in 1994, featuring the cat and mouse pair Itchy & Scratchy from the American animated television series The Simpsons. Developed by Beam Software, it was the first game to feature these characters. In the game, the player controls Scratchy as he plays through a miniature golf course of nine holes while at the same time avoiding Itchy's attacks. It received mixed reviews from critics.

== Gameplay ==
The player takes control of Scratchy as he plays through various mini golf courses, trying to achieve a good score, while at the same time avoiding Itchy's attacks. Itchy uses weapons such as grenades, bazookas, chainsaws, meat cleavers, and dynamite. Scratchy can acquire items, such as a baseball bat or throwing knives, and power-ups to defend himself against Itchy. He can also use his putter as a weapon. There are a total of nine levels, or holes, in the game.

== Development and release ==
Itchy & Scratchy in Miniature Golf Madness was developed by Beam Software and published by Acclaim. The game was released exclusively for the hand-held Game Boy console in November 1994. Despite the violence, it was rated E (Everyone) by the Entertainment Software Rating Board.

== Reception ==
Critics gave Itchy & Scratchy in Miniature Golf Madness mixed reviews. Nintendo Power gave it a 2.825/5 rating in their August 1994 issue. In February 1995, VideoGames & Computer Entertainment wrote that "You'll never know just how fun miniature golf can be until you play this Itchy and Scratchy game. The unique gameplay sets it apart from other platform games, You play as Scratchy, who's trapped in a miniature golf park, Itchy's after Scratchy, equipped with chainsaws, electric cattle prods and flame throwers. You've got to maneuver your golf ball through each level. And watch out for all those little golf ball traps. You'll see plenty of innovative miniature golf contraptions. You get a golf game and an action game all in one." The magazine gave Miniature Golf Madness a 9 out of 10 rating. GamePro rated the game 11.5/20, commenting that the controls are accurate but the graphics are boring and the music is repetitive, making an overall mediocre game.

On The Simpsons, Itchy and Scratchy are featured in over-the-top violent cartoons in which Itchy repeatedly kills Scratchy. UGO Networks said they "assume that whoever thought of this [game] never actually saw the show. That's really the only excuse. Instead of maiming each other, Itchy and Scratchy decide to settle their beef on the miniature golf course." They added, however, that "Despite the fact that it didn't make sense, the game's not too bad. You play as Scratchy and you have to drive your golf ball across a sidescrolling level and avoid being beat on by Itchy. It's certainly better than Bart and the Beanstalk, but that's not saying much."

In a 1995 review of Miniature Golf Madness and The Itchy & Scratchy Game (1994, Game Gear, SNES), Jeff Kapalka of the Syracuse Herald-American wrote that Miniature Golf Madness has "all the pointless violence and mayhem that's in [The Itchy & Scratchy Game], but there's also the actual golf game that you have to survive. (The golf game is pretty neat, in and of itself. Throw in the aspect of sudden death - literally - and you've got an exciting, funny cart.)" He also commented on the look of the game: "Playing on a regular Game Boy, the graphics are, of course, not as spiffy as on the Game Gear. But then again, there's nowhere near the amount of flicker, either. Scratchy's 'deaths' are pretty spectacular, nonetheless. I was able to get through a few rounds on the Super Game Boy, and the default colors were quite nice. (No custom border on the screen, though. Sigh.) Still, I'm hoping that Acclaim eventually manages to port this game over to the Game Gear." Kapalka gave the game 2.5/4 stars.
