= Bart Simpson's Escape from Camp Deadly =

1991 video game

- North American cover art
- Developer: Imagineering
- Publisher: Acclaim Entertainment
- Designers: David Crane; Mark Klein; Barry Marx
- Artist: Mike Sullivan
- Composer: Mark Van Hecke
- Series: The Simpsons
- Platform: Game Boy
- Release: NA: November 1991; EU: December 1991; JP: February 26, 1993
- Genres: Action, platform
- Mode: Single-player

Bart Simpson's Escape from Camp Deadly is a 1991 platform video game developed by Imagineering and published by Acclaim Entertainment for the Game Boy. Based on the animated television series The Simpsons, the player controls Bart as he escapes from an unpleasant summer camp run by ruthless counselors. The plot is similar to that of The Simpsons episode "Kamp Krusty", although the game was released nearly a year before that episode aired. Critics gave the game mixed reviews.

== Plot and gameplay ==
Bart and Lisa go to spend the summer at a camp, which turns out to be the dangerous Camp Deadly run by Mr. Burns's nephew, Ironfist Burns. His intentions are to make sure that the children suffer and have as little fun as possible, refusing to allow them to leave until they are thoroughly miserable. In the first stage of the game, Bart and the other children play capture the flag in a forest, as part of the camp's morning activity. Bart is harassed by camp counselors and bullies Blindside Bill and Rebound Rodney, and must make his way through nests of angry bees and other obstacles. The second stage takes place during lunch break at the mess hall, where the counselors throw knives and forks at Bart. Bart can retaliate by throwing food, but if caught he will be made to eat his entire arsenal.

Another game of capture the flag follows in the next stage as the afternoon activity. While playing, Bart must avoid counselors, bullies, killer hornets and traps set out for the escaped Madman Mort. Bart will find Mort in a trap and choose to free him. The fourth stage is dinner break and is the same as the lunch break stage, albeit with increased difficulty. If Bart made the decision to free Madman Mort in the prior stage, he will reappear at a particularly difficult point in the dinner stage to come to Bart's aid. The following day, Bart and Lisa decide to escape from Camp Deadly, both because it is too dangerous and because they cannot stand it anymore. However, Ironfist overhears their plans. At night, in the next stage, they escape by climbing to the other side of a mountain called Mount Deadly. The game's final stage takes place in a forest on the other side. Partway through, Ironfist captures Lisa, and Bart later finds them both at a power station supplying the camp with power. Bart defeats him and frees Lisa. Together, they find and flip a switch at the station that shuts off the power at Camp Deadly and puts an end to their stay there. The end scene shows Bart and Lisa joyfully reunited with Maggie, Marge, and Homer.

Bart Simpson's Escape from Camp Deadly is a side-scrolling 2D platform game. It is single-player-only, and the player controls Bart. Lisa's role in the stages is giving Bart boomerangs to use against the various enemies. His default weapon is spit wads, and in the cafeteria stages, the barely edible food offered at the camp.

== Development and release ==
The game was developed by Imagineering and published by Acclaim. While the game was still in development, Nintendo Power gave out a walkthough in its October 1991 issue. There are quite a few differences between the game's beta and final versions, in which the madman the player rescued in one part was "Madman Krimmel Krogan", whose appearance looked similar to Jason Voorhees from the Friday the 13th series before his design was changed to the long-haired, overall-wearing, maskless Madman Mort in the final version. Also, the Mount Deadly the player is scaling in another part was named "Mt. Milehigh" before its name was changed to make it more fitting in the final version (as well as the preceding dialogue between Bart and Lisa on how to escape Camp Deadly).

The game was released in 1991 in North America and Europe for the hand-held console Game Boy. The game was released in Japan under the name Bart's Survival Camp (バートのサバイバルキャンプ, Bāto no Sabaibaru Kyanpu) on February 26, 1993. It was the first Simpsons game to be released on a portable console. The plot of Bart Simpson's Escape from Camp Deadly bears a strong similarity to the Simpsons episode "Kamp Krusty" in the sense that they both revolve around Bart and Lisa staying at an evil summer camp. However, that episode did not air until 1992, a year after the game was released.

== Reception ==
Reception

Review scores
Publication	Score
Famitsu	4/10, 5/10, 4/10, 6/10
Rocky Mountain News	C+

Bart Simpson's Escape from Camp Deadly has received mixed reviews. Nintendo Power gave it a 3.4/5 rating. UGO Networks gave the game a negative review, commenting that "this uninspired train wreck of a Game Boy title fails on nearly every level, but most of all simply because it's a snore-fest. It's your basic side-scrolling platformer with little to no connection to the source material and lasts only about few hours at best. During the game you come across bullies, camp counselors and even a few wild animals, battling them with spitballs, a boomerang and, in the lunchroom level, food. This one is for completists only." Matt Williamson of the Rocky Mountain News gave the game a C+ grade and commented that "Escape from Camp Deadly tries too hard to be a Nintendo game. It's hard, I know, to try to make game graphics more primitive, but please, guys, the more complex you make the graphics, the more confusing a game gets!" However, the Channel 4 video game programme GamesMaster gave the game an 89% rating. GamePro gave the game an average review, writing, "With just three lives and no continues, The Simpson's Escape from Camp Deadly [sic] is a tough nut to crack. Then again, Bart's never made anybody's life easy. If you're a Bart fan who loves a challenge, chances are you'll find yourself returning to this weird and wicked camp, time and time again." (Note: GamePro gave the game two 4/5 scores for graphics and sound, two 3/5 scores for gameplay and fun factor, and 5/5 for challenge.) In Japan, two reviewers in Weekly Famicom Tsūshin were upset that the game was only in English and two found it to be a run-of-the-mill action game. Two reviewers were split on how they felt about Bart, with one saying he had some charm, while the other saying he was too off-putting.

In 2009, 1Up.com editor Bob Mackey reviewed the game in 1Up's official Retro Gaming Blog. He wrote: "Camp Deadly drops the limited adventure elements of Bart Vs. the Space Mutants in exchange for some much simpler platforming with vastly improved controls [...]. The simple jumping and shooting is nothing to write home about, but Camp Deadly would have at least been a semi-competent early Game Boy game if not for the interminable waves of enemies it constantly throws at you. Here we see a common problem with Game Boy titles: the developers were clearly designing Camp Deadly with a big-screen mindset. Enemies teleport in from the edge of the screen and, given how little space there is to actually maneuver, you sometimes have less than a second to react."

Along with Konami's Teenage Mutant Ninja Turtles II: Back from the Sewers (1991), Bart Simpson's Escape from Camp Deadly was among the first Game Boy titles to include digitized voice samples.

According to internal sales data, by 1994 the game had sold approximately 76,000 copies.
