= The Simpsons (video game) =

1991 video game

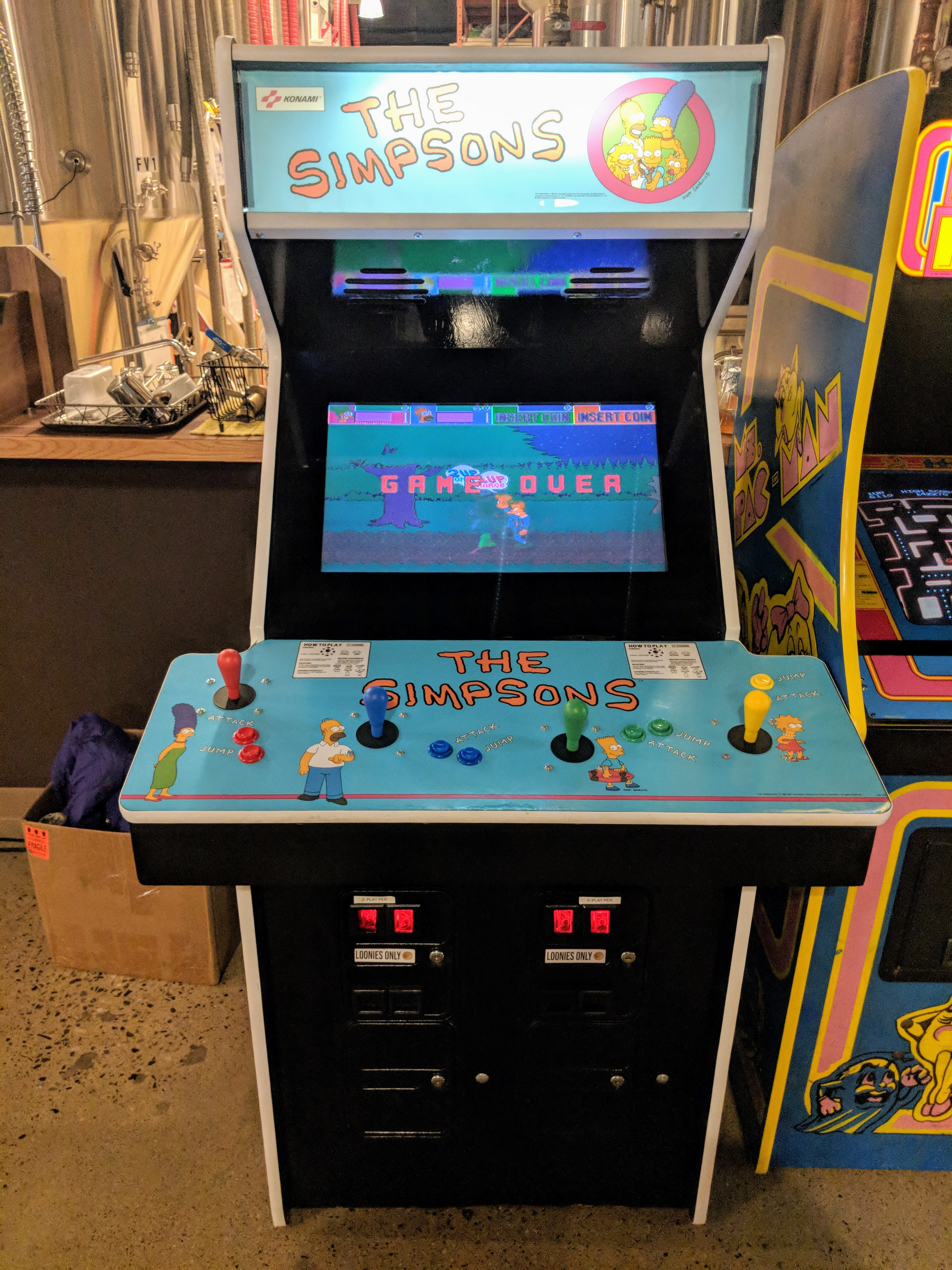
- The Simpsons four player arcade cabinet
- Developer: Konami (Note: Ported to Commodore 64 and MS-DOS by Novotrade.)
- Publisher: Konami
- Director: Kengo Nakamura
- Producer: S. Kido
- Programmers: Akira Suzuki; Hirotaka Ishikawa; NWK
- Artists: Kengo Nakamura; Yasushi Takano; K. Nakajima; Noriyuki Yokoki; Hiroshi Iuchi
- Composer: Norio Hanzawa
- Series: The Simpsons
- Platforms: Arcade; Commodore 64; MS-DOS
- Release: Arcade: NA: March 1991; JP: August 11, 1991; WW: 1991; Commodore 64, MS-DOS: NA: 1991
- Genre: Beat 'em up
- Modes: Single-player, multiplayer

The Simpsons is a 1991 beat 'em up video game developed and published by Konami. It was the second video game based on the animated television series The Simpsons to be released in North America. The game allows up to four players to control members of the Simpson family as they fight various enemies to rescue Maggie. The game features archival recordings from the show's first season mixed with brand new recordings by its voice actors, with Dan Castellaneta, Julie Kavner, Nancy Cartwright and Yeardley Smith reprising their respective roles as the Simpsons family.

The game was a commercial success in the United States, where it was one of the top three best-selling arcade games of 1991. It was ported to the Commodore 64 and MS-DOS soon after its launch in the arcades, and was released as The Simpsons Arcade Game on those platforms. It was also released under that title on Xbox Live Arcade for Xbox 360 and PlayStation Network for PlayStation 3 in February 2012; however, for unknown reasons, it was removed from both services on December 20, 2013. In 2021, under license from 20th Century Games, Arcade1Up released a 30th anniversary home arcade cabinet that features this game and The Simpsons Bowling.

== Gameplay ==
Example of the gameplay of The Simpsons video game. This screenshot is from the 7th stage of the game, where Marge is battling through enemies.

The Simpsons is a side-scrolling beat 'em up that allows players to join in at any time. Two different cabinet models were produced: one allowing up to two simultaneous players, each able to choose a character, and another allowing four players with a dedicated position for each character. Controls consist of an eight-way joystick and two buttons to jump and attack. However, the Japanese version is exclusively 2-player.

The characters have distinctive attack styles; Homer punches and kicks, Marge swings a vacuum cleaner, Bart wields a skateboard, and Lisa attacks with a jump rope. Two characters standing close to each other can mount a combined attack: Homer and Marge holding each other's ankles to roll around the screen and mow down enemies, Homer placing either kid on his shoulders so they can strike at two different heights, Marge throwing either kid, and Bart and Lisa linking arms to execute a clothesline attack. Each player has a health meter, which decreases upon being hit by enemies; food items can be picked up to replenish it. Players can also pick up and throw/swing items such as hammers, bowling balls, and mailboxes as melee weapons, and two players can team up to throw very heavy items such as police cars. One life is lost whenever a player's health meter runs out; if all lives are lost, the player may continue the game by adding credits within a time limit. Two minigames played between stages require players to hit their buttons as quickly as possible, with computer-controlled enemies replacing any characters not in play.

The Japanese version of the game includes many differences from the North American release:

- Throwable small-scale nuclear bombs that clear out all enemies within the blast radius.
- A life bar that can accumulate up to two levels beyond full capacity when the player eats food, and which is refilled at the beginning of each new level.
- A scoring system that awards different point values for each enemy type defeated, instead of a single point per enemy.
- End-of-level bonuses based on the amount of life remaining.
- Point awards in the bonus stages that are actually added to the player's score.
- Hidden items that are revealed when a player hits specific objects.

Binky and Bongo, two characters from Matt Groening's comic strip Life in Hell, make brief appearances during the game.

== Plot ==
While walking through downtown Springfield, the Simpson family collide with Waylon Smithers, who has just stolen a large diamond from a jewelry shop for Mr. Burns. The diamond goes flying and lands in Maggie Simpson's mouth, and she begins sucking on it like a pacifier as Smithers kidnaps her. The rest of the Simpsons give chase across the city, fighting off hordes of enemies (hired by Mr. Burns) to reach the Springfield Nuclear Power Plant. The pursuit covers eight stages, each of which ends with a fight against a strong boss character. In the final stage, the Simpsons must defeat first Smithers and then Mr. Burns, who uses a mobile battle suit equipped with a variety of weapons. Once Mr. Burns is defeated, Maggie puts her pacifier in his mouth and the Simpsons take her home, with Maggie now sucking on the diamond.

== Reception ==
Reception

Review scores
Publication	Score
AllGame	4.5/5 (Arcade)
Dragon	3/5 (MS-DOS)
Game Informer	8.75/100 (Arcade)
GameSpot	3/10 (XBLA)
Sinclair User	86% (Arcade)
Zero	5/5 (Arcade)

In the United States, thousands of arcade cabinets were ordered upon its debut at the American Coin Machine Exposition (ACME) in March 1991. The Simpsons went on to win a Platinum award from the American Amusement Machine Association (AAMA) for sales achievement in 1991, making it one of the top three best-selling arcade video game machines of 1991 (with the Neo Geo MVS which won Platinum and below Street Fighter II which won Diamond). In Japan, Game Machine listed The Simpsons on their October 1, 1991, issue as being the eleventh-most-popular arcade game for the previous two weeks.

The arcade game received positive reviews from critics. Sinclair User gave it a positive review, saying: "It's the great looking graphics, good sampled sound and clever animations that makes the Simpsons such fun to play". ScrewAttack ranked the arcade game as the best cartoon-based game. The game was inducted into GameSpy's Hall of Fame.

The PC/MS-DOS version of the game was reviewed in 1992 in Dragon #180 by Hartley, Patricia, and Kirk Lesser in "The Role of Computers" column. The reviewers gave the game 3 out of 5 stars.

== Legacy ==
Soon after the Simpsons' arcade release, Novotrade released ports for Commodore 64 and MS-DOS computers. A listing on the Australian Classification Board website, posted on November 9, 2011, hinted at a port of the game being developed by Backbone Entertainment for multiple platforms. In January 2012, a high-definition port of The Simpsons Arcade Game was announced for PlayStation Network for release in February, with a release on Xbox Live Arcade also revealed. The port features online multiplayer, the ability to unlock the rare Japanese 4-player version of the game, and promotional content from the game's arcade launch. The game was initially made available exclusively to PlayStation Plus users at no charge. In December 2013, the game was removed from the PlayStation Network store, although at the time it was still available through the Xbox Live Marketplace; no reason for the removal was given by either Sony or Konami.

A completely different title inspired by the arcade game, The Simpsons Arcade, was released by Electronic Arts (EA) for iOS on December 19, 2009. Unlike the arcade game, the title is a single player game where players control Homer, assisted by the other family members via power-ups. The plot is also slightly altered, as it revolves around a thumb drive containing plans for Burns' "Project: Operation Mission" hidden inside a donut that Homer attempted to eat after bumping into Smithers, who had been tasked with securing the plans, allegedly containing the town's secret data. With Burns' associates retrieving the donut and taking turns keeping it safe while Homer remains ignorant of the drive inside, his objective is simply to take back the donut. But first, he must defeating Chief Wiggum before advanced to next level, before taking final showdown with Burns in his mansion.

In June 2021, Arcade1Up announced its intent to release a 30th anniversary edition home arcade cabinet.
