= The Simpsons: Bartman Meets Radioactive Man =

1992 video game

- NES cover art
- Developer: Imagineering (Note: Game Gear version developed by Teeny Weeny Games.)
- Publisher: Acclaim Entertainment (Note: Released under the Flying Edge brand name on the Game Gear.)
- Producer: Dan Kitchen
- Designers: Barry Marx; Dan Kitchen; Roger Booth; W. Marshall Rogers
- Programmers: Chung S. Lau; Shen Jian Long; Roger Booth; Bill Jannott
- Artists: Glen A. Schofield; Gregory A. Faccone
- Composer: Mark Van Hecke
- Series: The Simpsons
- Platforms: NES, Game Gear
- Release: NES: NA: December 1992; Game Gear: NA: February 1994
- Genre: Platform
- Mode: Single-player

The Simpsons: Bartman Meets Radioactive Man is a 1992 platform game based on the Fox animated television series The Simpsons. Released by Acclaim Entertainment for the Nintendo Entertainment System and Game Gear, it follows Bart Simpson as he embarks on a comic book quest to rescue his kidnapped idol, superhero Radioactive Man. The game received mixed reviews from critics, with criticism being directed at the gameplay control.

== Gameplay ==
Bartman Meets Radioactive Man is a side-scrolling platform game. Throughout the four chapters, Bartman is faced with enemies he has to defeat. He only has five life points, but if he loses one or more of them they can be restored. This is done by collecting radioactive signs. The player is able to collect lightning icons that give Bartman the ability to shoot lightning bolts at enemies from his eyes. His other weapons are kicking and punching. In addition, Bartman must avoid the deadly traps that are scattered at various places in the levels. At the end of each chapter, Bartman must face one of the super villains that stole Radioactive Man's powers.

== Plot ==
Bart Simpson is at home reading a Radioactive Man comic book only to be shocked as Radioactive Man's sidekick, Fallout Boy, jumps out of it. Fallout Boy tells Bart that he must venture into the comic book universe in order to save Radioactive Man, who is being held captive at the black hole-orbiting prison Limbo Zone. Once inside the comic book world, Bart transforms into his superhero alter ego Bartman and has to defeat three super villains that have stolen Radioactive Man's powers: Swamp Hag, Dr. Crab, and Lava Man. After collecting these powers, Bartman must find Radioactive Man and team up with him to defeat Brain-O the Magnificent, the mastermind behind the evil plot.

== Development ==
The game was developed by Imagineering and published by Acclaim. It was released in 1992 for the Nintendo Entertainment System (NES) and the handheld Game Gear. At the time when the game was released, the "Bartman" alter ego was popular in merchandise relating to The Simpsons, although the character rarely appeared in the television series. Radioactive Man had not been featured much either at that point. In regard to this, an 1UP.com editor commented that "when it comes to mining the show for content, Bartman Meets Radioactive Man is really reaching." The Simpsons creator Matt Groening was involved with the development of earlier video games based on the series, having final approval on all storylines and character designs. For Bartman Meets Radioactive Man, Groening changed a character named Queen Ant DeLuvian to Queen Grouchina, though no character with either name exists in the released version of the game.

== Reception ==
Reception

Review scores
Publication	Score	
Publication	Game Gear	NES
GamePro	13/20	13/20
GameZone	N/A	71/100
Joypad	N/A	56%
Official Nintendo Magazine	N/A	73/100
Total!	N/A	67%
Video Games (DE)	N/A	68%
VideoGames & Computer Entertainment	6/10	6/10
Electronic Games	B+	N/A
N-Force	N/A	77/100

Bartman Meets Radioactive Man received generally mixed reviews from critics. In February 1994, the GamePro magazine commented, "Though it's not a toxic waste of time, Bartman meets Radioactive Man is an average game with handicaps that affect its playability and your enjoyment. Only you can determine if it's a meltdown or not." Game Players gave the game a 44/100 rating with the rationale that "it's full of frustrating jumps, and there are no passwords [for saving]."

In the fifth issue of Nintendo Magazine System, reviewer Andrew called Bartman Meets Radioactive Man inferior to Krusty's Fun House and gave it a score of 73 out of 100. He wrote that the game starts in a "promising manner," but quickly "degenerates" into a generic platforming game, concluding with "It would be easy to ignore Bart Meets Radioactive Man, and, if you did, you wouldn't miss out on much. But if you can cope with boring graphics and monotone tunes, you have a tough game that should take a while to complete."

In 2009, 1UP.com editor Bob Mackey reviewed the game in 1UP's official Retro Gaming Blog. He wrote that Bart "still has the same awful, inconsistent jumping from his first NES game. [...] Really, this game could have been somewhat interesting if the developers used the Radioactive Man character to parody existing comics and comic eras—as they did in the show and the Radioactive Man comic book—but that's asking way too much of a licensed 8-bit game."

Writing for Tribune Media Services in 1993, columnists Chip and Jonathan Carter gave Bartman Meets Radioactive Man a more positive review. They wrote that "we haven't seen a bad Simpsons game yet, and Bartman's actions and graphics are as good as the others. This one-player cart's not quite as much fun as the first two NES Simpsons games — probably because it's harder — but it still stands mask and cape above most other 8-bit games." The game received a 70/100 rating from the Dutch magazine Power Unlimited in 1994.
