= Bart Simpson's Guide to Life =

1993 book by Matt Groening

- Author: Various
- Language: English
- Genre: Self-help manual
- Published: August 1993 (HarperPerennial)
- Publication place: United States
- Media type: Hardback
- Pages: 192
- ISBN: 978-0-06-096975-2

Bart Simpson's Guide to Life is a humorous book published in the United States in 1993 by HarperCollins (imprint HarperPerennial). It includes advice from the Simpsons character Bart Simpson on how to deal with life. The book was written by several authors, and was helped into print by Matt Groening. It has received critical praise.

== Background ==
The book was published in 1993 by HarperCollins. The entire name of the book is Bart Simpson's Guide to Life: A Wee Handbook for the Perplexed. It was written by numerous contributing authors: Peter Alexander, Jamie Angell, Ted Brock, Eileen Campion, Max Franke, Jim Jensen, Barbara McAdams, Bill Morrison, Mili Smythe, Mary Trainor, and Doug Whaley. The Simpsons creator Matt Groening is credited with helping the book into print. Morrison, Dale Hendrickson, and John Adam are listed as the book's artists.

== Contents ==
The main purpose of Bart Simpson's Guide to Life is to give supposedly helpful tips and advice on how to cope with life (including parents, peers, school, romance, health, and manners) as experienced by the fictional character Bart Simpson from the animated television series The Simpsons. Although, as noted by Nancy Basile of About.com, "one should be cautious when accepting advice from the child who spends much of his school time at the blackboard writing punishments." Phillip Slee wrote in Child, Adolescent and Family Development that the book provides a "contemporary glimpse into the world of middle childhood". Specific things taught to readers by Bart in the book include how to increase one's allowance, avoid chores in the home, and getting away with cheating in school. A nutritional manual by Bart is also included.

== Reception ==
Nancy Basile of About.com gave Bart Simpson's Guide to Life a five out of five rating, commenting: "This book is a bargain. You'll get a lot of laughs for a lot less than other cartoon books. [...] If you're a Bart fan, you must own this book. If you're a fan of The Simpsons, you'll love this book. If you're just getting to know our favorite family, you should pick up this book to enjoy some giggles at new jokes and Bart's past adventures. Every fan will love this book, the first, second and third time." Basile also praised the illustrations as "hysterical".

March Rogers, writing for RTÉ.ie, was more negative. He wrote: "The funny bit is Matt Groening's introduction, from there is falls away to the kind of humour written on the walls of bathrooms and the backs of copy books in primary school. It seems to be pitched in-between audiences—too adult for children, too childish for adults. Page after page of annoyingly laid out poorly written prose recommending everything from cool things to be when you grow up to questioning whether or not they have secret sauce in Heaven. This attempt to portray the Simpsons characters indicates both that they do not translate well to print and that whoever contributed to this book was not a writer on the show."

Bart Simpson's Guide to Life was included on a list of "30-plus actual books written by fictional TV characters" by authors of The A.V. Club. They wrote that because "characters have developed and the show's voice has changed, Bart's Guide To Life is understandably a bit dated 17 years later (see the reference to Simpsons bootleg shirts), but like a lot of the books on this list, it's a souvenir from a different pop-cultural age."
