= The Simpsons: Bart's House of Weirdness =

1992 video game

Bart's House of Weirdness
- Developer: Distinctive Software
- Publisher: Konami
- Series: The Simpsons
- Platform: MS-DOS
- Release: NA: January 1, 1992
- Genre: Platform
- Mode: Single-player

The Simpsons: Bart's House of Weirdness is a platform video game published by Konami for MS-DOS in 1992. Developed by Distinctive Software, it is based on the Simpsons franchise and features many aspects from the series. In the game, the player controls Bart as he escapes from the Simpsons' house after being sent to his room by his parents. On his adventures throughout town, Bart is equipped with various weapons that are used to fend off enemies and animals. Reviews of the game were positive.

== Plot and gameplay ==
Bart's House of Weirdness is an action-adventure platform game that uses single-screen movement. The plot sees Bart being sent to his room by his parents Homer and Marge after having pulled one too many pranks. With nothing to do, he quickly gets bored and escapes from the home. He travels around town, and eventually heads to an amusement park where he has to save Krusty the Clown from his archenemy Sideshow Bob.

The game has six levels and a final battle. The player controls Bart as he helps his sister Maggie recover her ball, explores the basement and attic of the Simpsons' home, sneaks out to the movie theater and the Springfield Mall, and has a dream in which he is inserted into the Itchy & Scratchy universe. During these levels, Bart fights dust bunnies, spiders (in the attic), ghosts (in the basement), space mutants (at the movie theater), and Itchy and Scratchy (in the dream world).

Bart is able to utilize a variety of weapons in the game, including a burp gun, a slingshot, spray paint, and water balloons. The player controls these weapons with either a keyboard or a joystick. The joystick control has two modes: one for shooting and one for jumping. Whenever the player misses one of the creatures and they are able to hit Bart, the life bar, called the "Cool-O-Meter", drops. In order to regain Bart's coolness, the player must find a cool item that he can use. When the player has completed all levels, Bart goes to the Krustyland amusement park to save Krusty from Bob.

== Development and release ==
Bart's House of Weirdness was developed by Distinctive Software and published by Konami. It was announced by Konami at the June 1991 International Summer Consumer Electronics Show in Chicago. The game was released in 1992 solely for MS-DOS, and was available for both Color Graphics Adapter (CGA) and Enhanced Graphics Adapter (EGA), but not Video Graphics Array (VGA). Writers for UGO Networks have commented that the fact that Bart's House of Weirdness was released exclusively for DOS "more than likely tells why its critical acclaim is zilch and fan support non-existent. It's surprising it got such a limited release, seeing it was published by Konami, who usually have no problem distributing games on a variety of platforms." Similarly, a 1UP.com editor wrote that the game is "mostly-unknown (there's not even a single video of it on YouTube)" and that it "deserves a little more coverage, if only to acknowledge its existence".

== Reception ==
A screenshot of the basement level. The bottom display shows, amongst other things, Bart's lives, health, and weapons. It also shows the level's objective; in this case, it is to find a key. The graphics of the game have been praised by critics as being "sharp and colorful" and "pretty lush", and the sprites have been described as "big [and] beautiful".

The game was reviewed in 1992 in issue 179 of Dragon magazine by Hartley, Patricia, and Kirk Lesser in the column "The Role of Computers". The reviewers gave the game five out of five stars, and commented that "Without a doubt, Bart's House of Weirdness is one of the best arcade games we’ve played. It also happens to be one of Konami’s best products!" They added that "With superb Roland sound (the TV show theme and opening animations are quite good) and smooth animation, our only wish is that Konami would consider releasing this fine arcade delight with full VGA support sometime in the future. If you like Bart and really enjoy arcade games, you have to get this one." William Burrill of Toronto Star commented that "the graphics in House of Weirdness are sharp and colorful, and look much like the television show. Music from the real show is also included, along with digitized samples of Bart's rather whining voice." Computer Gaming World liked the graphics' resemblance to the TV show, and concluded that "House of Weirdness stands up as well as any 'Super-Maroid' arcade game".

In 2009, eighteen years after Bart's House of Weirdness was released, 1UP.com editor Bob Mackey reviewed the game in 1UP's official Retro Gaming Blog. He praised the game for its graphics, but was critical of the gameplay. Mackey wrote that "the graphics are far more impressive than any other Simpsons title at the time, outside of the arcade brawler. In fact, the graphics alone were responsible for my childlike [...] excitement over House of Weirdness; [...] they're pretty lush — even if they're not entirely faithful to the show. Bart's PC translation might be just a little off-model, but it's a gigantic leap over his duck-like visage seen on the NES." He added, however, that the game "is completely unintuitive, your goals aren't made clear, it's never certain if you're doing the right thing, and you're often locked into screens with no apparent way out but death." Mackey also criticized the levels' structure that "seems more randomly-generated than anything" and the fact that the "big, beautiful" sprites sometimes do not move well.
