= The Simpsons: Road Rage (GBA video game) =

2003 driving video game

- Developer: Altron
- Publisher: THQ
- Producers: Harold Kim; Yoshihiro Tanaka; Mike Schneider
- Programmers: Shinya Odaira; Yoshito Shimada
- Artists: Yusuke Sato; Daisuke Nakano; Emiko Yoshikawa
- Composer: Tomoyoshi Sato
- Series: The Simpsons
- Platform: Game Boy Advance
- Release: NA: July 3, 2003
- Genre: Driving
- Modes: Single-player, multiplayer

The Simpsons: Road Rage is a 2003 driving game developed by Altron and published by THQ for the Game Boy Advance. Based on the animated television series The Simpsons, the game allows players to control several characters from the series, who must drive through the town of Springfield and transport passengers to their destinations within a time limit. The objective is to accumulate one million dollars in fares to repurchase the local transit system from Mr. Burns. The game received mixed reviews upon release, with critics drawing comparisons to Crazy Taxi and praising its amount of content and fast-paced action while criticizing its graphics, fidelity to the series, and password save feature.

== Gameplay ==
In this example of gameplay from The Simpsons: Road Rage, Homer Simpson is transporting Principal Skinner, whose emotional state is displayed on the right-hand side.

The Simpsons: Road Rage is a driving game in which the player selects one of multiple characters from The Simpsons television series and drives a vehicle through the town of Springfield. The main objective is to generate enough revenue (totaling one million dollars) to repurchase the local transit system from Mr. Burns, who has converted the buses to nuclear power and imposed high fares. The player accomplishes this by offering a taxi service: they must locate and collect waiting passengers and deliver each to a designated destination before a time limit expires.

Money is awarded primarily for successful and timely deliveries. Additional earnings can be made from arriving early and stopping as close as possible to the precise target location. Every third passenger offers bonus objectives, such as destroying a set number of roadside objects or reaching the destination without striking any other vehicles. An on-screen arrow and map serve as navigation tools, though the destinations are fixed points that frequently lie off-road, requiring the player to seek a trail.

The game presents five modes: Road Rage, Performance, Sunday Drive, Mission, and Head to Head. The Road Rage mode involves continuously picking up and dropping off passengers within a time limit that extends with each successful delivery. Accumulated earnings from each run are added to the overall total. In the Performance mode, the driver is assigned a single passenger for the entire session, with income being earned through hitting roadside objects and other cars, making jumps, maintaining speed, or honking the horn in certain zones. The Sunday Drive mode allows the player to practice and explore the available neighborhoods without time limits or scores. The Mission mode presents a series of short, character-specific scenarios, such as destroying particular objects or performing stunts. Head to Head is a two-player competitive mode accessible via two separate cartridges and a Game Link Cable in which players compete to earn the highest amount of fares.

Progression through the game is based on reaching certain cash goals, which unlock additional playable characters (totaling up to 15) and locations, as well as miscellaneous extras accessible through the options menu. Progress is recorded via an eight-character picture-based password system rather than EEPROM; the password preserves unlocked content but does not store high scores or other gameplay elements.

== Development and release ==
The Simpsons: Road Rage was developed by Altron and published by THQ. The publisher reached an agreement with Fox Interactive in 2002 that gave them the rights to publish the Game Boy Advance version and a Buffy the Vampire Slayer game. Germaine Gioia, vice president of licensing at THQ, said "The Simpsons and Buffy properties have enjoyed tremendous consumer appeal in nearly every product category, including video game successes. Both properties will serve to further bolster our leadership position on the Game Boy Advance." The game was produced by THQ's Harold Kim, Altron's Yoshihiro Tanaka, and Fox Interactive's Mike Schneider. It was programmed by Shinya Odaira and Yoshito Shimada, and the graphics were designed by Yusuke Sato, Daisuke Nakano, and Emiko Yoshikawa. The audio was created by Tomoyoshi Sato. The game was released in North America on July 3, 2003.

== Reception ==
Reception

Aggregate score
Aggregator	Score
Metacritic	55/100

Review scores
Publication	Score
AllGame	2/5
Game Informer	2.25/10
GameSpot	5.9/10
GameSpy	2/5
GameZone	5.5/10
IGN	7.5/10
Nintendo Power	2/5, 2.5/5, 3.5/5, 3/5, 2.5/5

The Simpsons: Road Rage was met with "mixed or average" reviews according to the review aggregation website Metacritic, with reviewers likening it to a simplified imitation of Crazy Taxi. Craig Harris of IGN found the game "surprisingly enjoyable" and fast-paced, noting that learning each passenger's preferences for reckless driving added variety in successfully earning money and that the amount of unlockable content increased the game's lifespan. Ray Barnholt of GameSpy opined that the Performance mode was more enjoyable than the rest of the game because it eliminated constant passenger hunting. Frank Provo of GameSpot acknowledged the list of features as solid, but criticized the neighborhoods as too small and the destinations as excessively limited and repetitive, which contributed to a feeling of going back and forth between two points rather than exploring the entire setting. Code Cowboy of GameZone described the Road Rage mode as "repetitive and annoying", with difficulty arising from poor design rather than intentional challenge; he elaborated that the vehicles handled poorly, the obstacles were "more annoying than fun", and the boundaries felt inhibiting. The reviewers of Nintendo Power decided that although the streets were wider and less packed with familiar landmarks than the GameCube version, the Performance mode was a "fun" addition. Scott Alan Marriott of All Game Guide argued that the Mode 7-style engine, while keeping the game moving at a fast pace, was inadequate for a free-roaming mission-based game as it made the distinction between drivable and restricted areas unclear, thus limiting the original's sense of "carefree, madcap driving". Justin Leeper of Game Informer condemned the navigation as "impossible" and the overall gameplay as "apocalyptically bad".

The graphics drew frequent commentary for their reliance on a Mode 7-style engine, which Harris noted was modified from that used in GT Advance 2: Rally Racing (2001), a title that shares some development team members. He praised the implementation for maintaining a high frame rate and fast pace while incorporating hills and interactive roadside objects, though he faulted the absence of three-dimensional buildings and the lining of the roads with invisible walls rather than physical fencing. Barnholt found the presentation overly busy, saying that the "jumble of colors and lines" may cause missed turns, and likened the visual sensation to "driving a mini RC car on the street after a New Year's celebration". However, he described the 2D art as "fairly non-intrusive and nice on the eyes". Provo labeled the graphics a "mess", explaining that structures appeared blocky and distorted and the unrestricted draw distance caused distant objects to distract from nearby turns. Code Cowboy regarded the visuals as decent yet lacking detail, with obstacles and targets difficult to identify and barriers poorly differentiated from the road. Marriott credited the visuals for their "clean and generally uncluttered" presentation and fidelity to the console version, but faulted the sparse and flattened environments for making navigation difficult. Leeper described Springfield as resembling "a parking lot with chalk drawings of streets on it and a few cardboard box "buildings" scattered haphazardly", and he called the Mode 7 implementation among the worst on the platform.

Critics felt that the game failed to capture the personality of the TV series. The absence of character voice samples was widely noted, with Harris and Barnholt mentioning that the feature was a major selling point with the console versions. Harris cited the MIDI rendition of The Simpsons Theme as the sole recognizable audio. Provo and Harris further pointed out that Springfield's familiar locations were merely represented as glowing tiles, with Provo concluding that the setting would not be identifiable as Springfield without the characters' presence. Leeper derided the setting as having "no trademark Simpsons charm".

The password save system was widely criticized. Harris interpreted the measure as THQ "cheap[ing]-out". Barnholt deemed passwords inherently "evil", while Code Cowboy expressed frustration at the approach. Provo considered the picture-based system especially cumbersome for players unfamiliar with the series' minor characters.
