= The Simpsons: Bart vs. the World =

1991 video game

- North American NES box art
- Developer: Imagineering (Note: Ports by Arc Developments.)
- Publishers: Acclaim Entertainment (Note: Released under the Flying Edge brand name on Sega systems.); Amiga, Atari ST; Virgin Interactive Entertainment
- Designers: Dan Kitchen; Roger Booth; Barry Marx
- Programmers: David Crane; Garry Kitchen; Shen Jian Long; Chung S. Lau; Mark Morris; Henry C. Will IV
- Artist: Jesse Kapili
- Composers: Mark Van Hecke; Amiga, Atari ST, Game Gear, Master System; Andi McGinty
- Series: The Simpsons
- Platforms: NES, Game Gear, Master System, Amiga, Atari ST
- Release: November 1991: NES; NA: November 1991; EU: October 22, 1992 Game Gear; EU: September 1993; NA: October 1993; JP: July 29, 1994 Master System; EU: September 1993 Amiga; EU: 1993 Atari ST; EU: 1993
- Genre: Platform
- Mode: Single-player

The Simpsons: Bart vs. the World is a 1991 platform game based on the animated television series The Simpsons. It was originally developed by Imagineering and published by Acclaim Entertainment for the Nintendo Entertainment System, and was later ported by Arc Developments to Amiga, Atari ST, Game Gear and Master System in 1993. The player controls Bart Simpson as he travels around the world on a scavenger hunt while facing off against Mr. Burns' family and agents. The game has received mixed reviews from critics.

== Plot ==
On the Krusty the Clown Show, Bart Simpson wins the opportunity to participate in a Round-the-World scavenger hunt. However, the contest has been rigged by Mr. Burns' assistant, Smithers, in order for Burns to rid himself of the Simpson family for all the trouble they have caused him over the years. Burns sends his agents and fellow family members to take care of the Simpsons during the scavenger hunt. Bart travels through various real-world locations collecting items, with occasional cameos from the other Simpsons family members.

== Gameplay ==
The Simpsons: Bart vs. the World is a 2D side-scrolling platform game. Single-player is the only mode available. There are four major areas in the game: China, the North Pole, Egypt and Hollywood, and each has several stages to play through. The final stage of each area pits Bart against a boss — all of which are members of the Burns clan: third cousin Fu Manchu Burns, second cousin's grand-nephew The Abominable Snow Burns, maternal grand-uncle Ramses Burns and unspecified relation Eric von Burns.

In each stage, Bart must navigate through the area, collecting items such as firecracker balls for self-defense and Squishees to restore health (Bart can take up to five hits before dying). By grabbing a cape, Bart can become his superheroic alter-ego, Bartman, and fly for limited periods. The most important items in each stage are Krusty-brand souvenirs. There is one in every stage, and Bart must find them all in order to get the best ending (as well as unlocking a bonus Hollywood level). The other Simpsons also appear to give hints on where the souvenirs are. There are also several mini-games in each area, with puzzles such as a matching-card game and a trivia game based on events in actual episodes (from the first two seasons only).

== Development ==
The game was first developed by Imagineering and published by Acclaim in 1991 for the home console Nintendo Entertainment System (NES). It was the second Simpsons game to be released for the NES, after The Simpsons: Bart vs. the Space Mutants (1991).

A follow-up to Bart vs. the Space Mutants was in discussion but not given a green light from Acclaim until the commercial success of the first game. Dan Kitchen said the development of the game was "born pretty quickly." Dan Kitchen recalled that in his original pitch meeting with 20th Century Fox, he said he looked out the studio window and said "you guys can take everyone around the world right here in your backlot, so let's do the same thing, let's do a level where Bart is literally walking across the animator's table and jumps into a sound stage and then he's in a pirate movie or China, various exotic places that I was trying to think would be fun to play."

The more puzzle-oriented elements of the first game would disappear in Bart vs. the World. Dan Kitchen said the development team took the original code and changed how Bart looked, the gameplay physics, and attempted to remove some gameplay elements such as far-reaching jumps and blind jumps. Imagineering received more input from Fox, which led to more characters from the television series being put in the game, leading to them showing up on the interstitial map and minigames.

In 1993, Bart vs. the World was released for the home console Master System (SMS), the personal computers Atari ST and Amiga, and the handheld console Game Gear (GG). The publishers for these versions were Flying Edge (SMS and GG), Virgin Games (Amiga), and Acclaim (ST). The developers were Arc Developments (GG, SMS, and ST) and Virgin Games (Amiga). The NES version of the game includes the theme song from The Simpsons.

== Reception ==
Reception

Review scores
Publication	Score
Electronic Gaming Monthly	4/10, 5/10, 3/10, 4/10 (NES); 7/10, 6/10, 7/10, 7/10 (Game Gear)
Joystick	42%

Reviews of Bart vs. the World have been mixed. GamePro gave the NES version an 80/100 rating, commenting that "after running him through the rigors of a zany-but-strenuous Nintendo workout, the conclusion of this review became obvious: if ya loved Bart in Bart vs. the Space Mutants, you're gonna like him in Bart vs. the World. Despite a few shortcomings here and there, Bart's new cart is a world-beater!" Tribune Media Services also gave it a positive review, writing that "the storyline is great, the graphics, as Bart would say, are 'cool, man', and the action and control are terrific. This version of The Simpsons is a lot more complex than the first — not harder, there's just more to it."

AllGame's Brett Alan Weiss was more negative, giving the NES version 2.5/5 stars. He wrote that "most of the puzzles [...] are childish and boring. Even younger kids will get tired with these silly little games after a while. [...] The Simpsons trivia is kind of cool; you'll find yourself remembering fondly several of the earlier episodes. However, the questions begin repeating themselves a little sooner than they should." He added that "once you are through toying around with the puzzles, you'll find that the meat of the game is lame as well. The level design is far from clever, the controls are sluggish, and the action is dull." A review in the Italian newspaper La Repubblica said the game was "very playable, though not particularly original."

The Dutch magazine Power Unlimited rated the Game Gear version 70/100, noting that it "consists partly of boring platform worlds" that are "not really worth the effort". They added, however, that "fortunately, there are also some simple puzzle games that are fun" and keep the game above mediocrity. A Game Players review gave the Game Gear version a 62/100 rating. The magazine wrote that "the twisted humor of other Simpsons games isn't there and the action segments could be from any game. Ignore it for home, but pack it for the beach."

In 2009, 1UP.com editor Bob Mackey reviewed the NES game in 1UP.com's official Retro Gaming Blog. He wrote that it had the same problems that Bart vs. the Space Mutants had, such as "lousy jumping physics", and that it "also manages to strip away the novelty that made the original Simpsons NES game worth checking out in the first place. The sequel is a straight-up, cookie-cutter platformer without any real Simpson-y touches to satisfy fans of the show; Bart finds himself wandering through generic side-scrolling levels, with a Simpsons character showing up every now and then to remind you that this is an actual licensed product and not just a ROM hack."

Entertainment Weekly gave the game a B and wrote that "A nice multicultural touch — at one point in this travel-action game, Bart skateboards down China's Great Wall — puts this a notch above Acclaim's other Simpsons games, if not up to the standards of the irrepressibly subversive TV show."

According to internal data, by 1994 Acclaim sold approximately 53,000 copies of the NES version and 42,000 copies of the Game Gear version.
