= Krusty's Fun House =

1992 video game

- European NES box art
- Developer: Audiogenic
- Publishers: Acclaim Entertainment (Note: Released under the Flying Edge brand name on Sega systems.) (Console versions); Virgin Games (Home computer versions)
- Designer: Fox Williams
- Artist: Patrick Fox
- Composers: Nu Romantic Productions; Bigmouth Studios (Console versions); David Whittaker (sound programming); Dave Lowe (MS-DOS sound programming)
- Series: The Simpsons
- Platforms: NES, SNES, Game Boy, Master System, Game Gear, Genesis/Mega Drive, Amiga, MS-DOS
- Release: 1992: MS-DOS; NA: 1992; EU: 1992 Genesis; NA: 1992; EU: December 17, 1992 SNES; NA: June 1992; EU: December 10, 1992; JP: January 29, 1993 NES; NA: September 1992; EU: 1992 Game Boy; NA: January 1993 Game Gear; NA: 1993; EU: May 1993 Master System; EU: May 1993
- Genres: Puzzle, platform
- Mode: Single-player

Krusty's Fun House, also known as Krusty's Super Fun House, is a 1992 puzzle video game based on the animated television series The Simpsons. It was developed by Audiogenic and published by Acclaim Entertainment for the Nintendo Entertainment System (NES), Super Nintendo Entertainment System (SNES), Sega Genesis, Master System, Game Gear, and Game Boy; versions for the Amiga and MS-DOS computers were released by Virgin Games. In the game, players control Krusty the Clown as they attempt to exterminate all rats in the various levels, using objects to create a path for the rats towards the machine.

Krusty's Fun House was reskinned from the 1991 puzzle game Rat Trap, developed by Patrick Fox and Scott Williams for the Atari ST, Amiga, and Commodore 64. After releasing it, Audiogenic approached Acclaim, who agreed to release the game with The Simpsons license. Krusty's Fun House received generally favorable reviews upon release.

== Gameplay ==
The player directs small rats to an extermination area through complicated maze-like levels. The player controls Krusty the Clown, who must navigate through his Krusty Brand Fun House. Each level is a puzzle in which a number of rats must be exterminated. Using different objects and obstacles, Krusty must create a path for the rats to follow and guide them towards an extermination device. Other creatures such as snakes, Martians, flying pigs and birds attempt to hinder Krusty's progress by injuring him; he must throw pies in order to defeat them.

In each stage the extermination devices are run by a different character, including Bart, Homer, Corporal Punishment and Sideshow Mel.

== Development ==
Acclaim Entertainment had the rights to The Simpsons brand and, starting with The Simpsons: Bart vs. the Space Mutants, released several games. Between 1991 and 1993, there were over nine video games based on the series, among them Krusty's Fun House.

The game's developer was Audiogenic, a company that was developing a game for home computers that was very similar to what Krusty's Fun House would become. The original game was Rat Trap developed by Patrick Fox and Scott Williams, featuring a big-headed pink-haired boy who guided rats around a stage towards a machine by placing blocks in certain places to exterminate them and was released in 1991 for the Atari ST, Amiga, and Commodore 64 computers.

The sole programmer for Krusty's Super Fun House was Douglas Hare. Hare was working as a freelancer on a potential original game for Audiogenic for the Super Nintendo Entertainment System. Audiogenic had sold the idea of reformatting Rat Trap as a The Simpsons-based game which then led to Acclaim getting Hare to port the game. The games feature nearly the same background as Rat Trap. Douglas said that the differences between the game were mostly limited to the addition of elements from The Simpsons, such as posters for Duff Beer in the background, while the Rats were designed to more closely match the style of Simpsons creator Matt Groening. Hare only worked on the Super NES version of the game.

== Release ==
The game was released in 1992 for the Amiga, NES, IBM PC compatibles, Master System, Game Gear, Game Boy, Super NES and Mega Drive/Genesis. Acclaim published the console versions and sub-licensed the home computer versions to Virgin. The 16-bit versions on the Super NES and the Mega Drive/Genesis were entitled Krusty's Super Fun House, as were the Amiga and DOS versions.

There are two revisions of the Super NES and Genesis games. Version 1.1 has completely different music for the second and fourth world.

== Reception ==
Reception

Review scores
Publication	Score
Mean Machines	90% (MD); 90% (SNES)
Super Play	79% (SNES)
Entertainment Weekly	A− (Mega Drive)
Go!	91/100 (GG)
N-Force	83/100 (NES)
NMS (Australia)	90/100 (GB)
Mega Action	86% (Mega Drive)

Award
Publication	Award
Nintendo Power Award '92	Best Overall NES Game - Nominated

Super Play magazine gave the SNES version of Krusty a 79 percent rating and wrote "it's actually pretty good fun to play, although perhaps more of a Younger Player-oriented game than anything else. Not one to set your heart on fire, but a good solid game nevertheless." Computer Gaming World in April 1994 said that the computer version "is an above average arcade/strategy game that is ideal to burn away half an hour or so". In 1995, Total! ranked the game 75th on their Top 100 SNES Games summarizing: "A sort of reverse Lemmings in which you have to kill the little on-screen characters."

According to internal data, by 1994 the game sold approximately 243,000 copies across all platforms combined.
