= The Simpsons: Bart & the Beanstalk =

1994 video game

- North American cover art
- Developer: Software Creations
- Publisher: Acclaim Entertainment
- Designer: Brian Ullrich
- Programmer: Andrew Routledge
- Artists: James Clarke; Alan Moult
- Composer: Joe Smith
- Series: The Simpsons
- Platform: Game Boy
- Release: NA: February 1994; JP: September 30, 1994; EU: 1994
- Genre: Platformer
- Mode: Single-player

The Simpsons: Bart & the Beanstalk is a platform game released in February 1994 for the hand-held console Game Boy. It was developed by Software Creations and published by Acclaim Entertainment, and is based on the animated television series The Simpsons. The game is a parody of the fairy tale "Jack and the Beanstalk"; a large beanstalk grows far up into the sky outside the home of Bart Simpson, whom the player controls. Bart climbs the beanstalk all the way to the top and adventure ensues. Bart & the Beanstalk has received mixed reviews from critics.

== Plot and gameplay ==
The game merges the existing universe of The Simpsons television series with the fairy tale of Jack and the Beanstalk. In the story, Bart Simpson goes to market to sell the family cow, but is swindled by a clever miser (played in the game by the character Mr. Burns) who trades it for magical beans and a slingshot. When Bart takes the magic beans home his father Homer Simpson accidentally eats them and spits them outside. A beanstalk grows, Bart climbs to the top, and adventures in a giant castle ensue. Bart meets several characters from The Simpsons on these adventures.

The Simpsons: Bart & the Beanstalk is a side-scrolling platform game. It is single-player only. The player of the game controls Bart in a total of seven levels. They are: "Up the Beanstalk", "Outside the Castle", "The Giant's Cupboard", "Soup Du Jour", "The Giant's Room", "Escape from the Castle", and "Down the Beanstalk". In order to complete a level, the player must collect a certain amount of gold coins. Bart is faced with a number of enemies on every level, and he can use his slingshot to fend them off. He can also pick up dynamite, which kills all enemies currently on the screen. The enemies featured in the game include beetles, hornets, flies, ducks, rats, and fire flies. On some levels, Bart also has to defeat a boss.

== Development and release ==
The game was developed by Software Creations and published by Acclaim. Richard Kay and Michael Webb served as executive producers, and Joe Smith composed the music. It was released in North America in February 1994 for the hand-held console Game Boy, and in Japan on September 30, 1994. The Simpsons: Bart & the Beanstalk is one of several The Simpsons Game Boy games published by Acclaim in the beginning of the 1990s.

== Reception ==
The Simpsons: Bart & the Beanstalk

Review scores
Publication	Score
Consoles +	86%
Electronic Gaming Monthly	6/10, 5/10, 5/10, 5/10
Famitsu	5/10, 4/10, 4/10, 4/10
Game Players	35/100
GamePro	3.5/5
Official Nintendo Magazine	76/100
Banzzaï	83%
Nintendo Acción	73/100
Super Console	76/100
Syracuse Herald-American	3/4

Bart & the Beanstalk has received mixed reviews from critics. In his 1994 book Video Games: A Guide for Savvy Parents, David Sheff describes Bart & the Beanstalk as "a frustratingly tough game without much whimsy." GamePro commented that "this drab game definitely lacks personality. There's a challenge here for those who want to sit through yet another simple side-scroller. Everyone else, though, might be better off trading in their magic beans for a cow." Similarly, a review in Game Players said "the designers of this action game took a standard story, plastered the Simpsons faces on boring characters, then threw in some of the show's running jokes. Bor-ring!" The four reviewers of Electronic Gaming Monthly found the game's biggest problem to be that it is too frustratingly hard, especially for the game's pre-adolescent target audience. They also stated that the difficulty stems chiefly from the poor design of Bart's slingshot. A reviewer in Nintendo Power complimented on the visually appealing characters and enemies and the fun concept while finding that it had poor control and bosses were tedious due to the amount of time it takes to defeat them.

Jeff Kapalka of the Syracuse Herald-American was more positive, giving the game a three out of four rating in a review. He commented that "the graphics are crisp, clear and cartoony, and it's a fun game for the Game Boy," and noted that the game is similar to the early side-scrolling Mario games. A review in the St. Petersburg Times called The Simpsons: Bart & the Beanstalk "fun and funny".

In 2009, 1UP.com editor Bob Mackey reviewed the game in 1UP's official Retro Gaming Blog. He described the game as annoying, but thought the graphics were good. Mackey wrote that "outside of a funky walk cycle from Bart, the game actually looks pretty nice—for some reason the Game Boy Simpsons games were always graphically superior to the NES ones—but that's about all the praise it deserves. Even more so than Camp Deadly, the screen of Beanstalk is awfully cramped, so the problem of enemies appearing out of nowhere to kill you has only gotten worse." Mackey added that he would have liked to see a more powerful weapon because the range of the slingshot is only a few feet.
