= The Itchy & Scratchy Game =

1995 video game

- Developer: Bits Studios
- Publisher: Acclaim Entertainment
- Producer: Robert Leingang
- Designers: Cos Lazouras; Alan Grier
- Programmers: Jason Austin; Doug Hare
- Artist: Alan Grier
- Composer: Shahid Ahmad
- Platforms: Super NES, Game Gear
- Release: March 1995
- Genre: Platform
- Mode: Single-player

The Itchy & Scratchy Game is a platform video game that was released for the Super NES and Game Gear. Based on the American animated television series The Simpsons, it stars the cat and mouse pair Itchy & Scratchy, and features the classic gory violence from the show. The main character is Itchy, who has to fight Scratchy. Reception of the game has been generally negative.

The game was also developed for the Genesis but it was never commercially released.

== Gameplay ==
The Itchy & Scratchy Game is a side-scrolling platform game based on The Itchy & Scratchy Show, a show within a show in the animated television series The Simpsons. There are seven levels in the game. The player controls Itchy, a mouse whose goal is to torture and kill the cat Scratchy. The game is played by running around the level and attacking Scratchy and various other enemies. Both Itchy and Scratchy carry mallets as their standard weapons, although various other weapons—coordinating with the theme of the level—can also be used. Every few moments, Scratchy will come onto the screen and then run away after attacking Itchy or Itchy has inflicted damage on Scratchy. Once Scratchy's health has been depleted, a boss battle will ensue.

== Development ==
The game was developed by Bits Studios and published by Acclaim. The game was rated "Kids to Adults" (suitable for children aged six and older) by the Entertainment Software Rating Board, "despite a plethora of chainsaws, axes, and flamethrowers," as a reviewer for Entertainment Weekly wrote. The SNES version has several censored dying animations compared to the unreleased but dumped Mega Drive/Genesis version.

== Reception ==
Reviews of The Itchy & Scratchy Game have been generally negative, with much criticism being directed at the gameplay. Reviewing the Genesis version, GamePro commented that "If the video game industry ever comes crashing down, Itchy and Scratchy will be near the top of the 'Blame Us' list." They cited the overly easy gameplay and absence of the excessive violence and theme song which made Itchy and Scratchy popular. A different GamePro reviewer made similar remarks of the Game Gear version, and further criticized it for its "grainy" sound and for omitting the boss battles of the console version. Game Players gave the SNES version a 35/100 rating in March 1995, commenting that the "gameplay suffers from extensive repetition and poor control and, despite the large number of weapons included in the game, there are too few opportunities to pick them up." Reviewing the SNES version, GamePro criticized the "mindless" gameplay, drab graphics, and tiresome animations, but concluded that "the control is the worst part. In a game of jumping and hitting, the lack of jumping attacks and the inaccurate weapons make you itch for a different game."

The Game Players review noted that "for true Simpsons fans, the Itchy and Scratchy level in Bart's Nightmare [from 1992] is still the best place to look for this duo." Entertainment Weekly gave the SNES game a grade of "C" in May 1995, and commented that "there's a reason Itchy & Scratchy cartoons rarely occupy more than 30 seconds of any Simpsons episode: stretch the concept to the full half-hour, and the ratings would plummet. It's the same for videogames. While Itchy and Scratchy appeared in a hilarious cameo on the Super NES and Mega Drive/Genesis game Bart's Nightmare, here they duke it out in an interminable, multistage whackfest." The gaming website UGO Networks was more positive, writing that the game "had great animation and was actually (gasp!) pretty funny."
