= The Simpsons: Bart vs. the Space Mutants =

1991 video game

- North American NES box art
- Developer: Imagineering (Note: Amstrad CPC, Commodore 64, ZX Spectrum, Genesis/Mega Drive, Master System and Game Gear ports by Arc Developments.)
- Publishers: Acclaim Entertainment (Note: Released under the Flying Edge brand name on Sega systems.); Home computers Ocean Software
- Director: Garry Kitchen
- Designers: Garry Kitchen; Barry Marx; Dan Kitchen; Roger Booth; Henry C. Will IV
- Artist: Jesse Kapili
- Writer: Barry Marx
- Composers: Danny Elfman (theme); Mark Van Hecke (NES); Mark Cooksey (MS/GG); Jonathan Dunn (computers)
- Series: The Simpsons
- Platforms: NES, Amiga, Amstrad CPC, Atari ST, Commodore 64, ZX Spectrum, Sega Genesis/Mega Drive, Master System, Game Gear
- Release: February 1991: NES; NA: February 1991; EU: December 12, 1991 Amiga; EU: September 1991 CPC, Atari ST, C64, ZX Spectrum; EU: 1991 Genesis/Mega Drive; NA: 1992; EU: 1992 Master System; EU: September 1992 Game Gear; NA: December 1992; EU: January 5, 1993
- Genre: Platform
- Mode: Single-player

The Simpsons: Bart vs. the Space Mutants is a 1991 platform video game based on the animated television series The Simpsons. It was originally developed by Imagineering and published by Acclaim Entertainment for the Nintendo Entertainment System, and was later released for the Amiga, Amstrad CPC, Atari ST, Commodore 64, and ZX Spectrum by Ocean Software, and in 1992 for the Sega Genesis, Master System, and Game Gear; all ports were developed by Arc Developments. In the game, the player controls Bart Simpson through five levels as he tries to ruin the aliens' plan to take over the world, collecting specific items and avoiding enemies.

Bart vs. the Space Mutants was designed by Garry Kitchen, who was approached by Acclaim in 1989 while the original Simpsons shorts were airing on The Tracey Ullman Show. Full production began in May 1990 with an intended release by Christmas 1990, but development issues caused the game to be delayed to early 1991. Upon release, Bart vs. the Space Mutants received mixed reviews, with criticism directed towards the control and high difficulty level. However, it was also a commercial success, selling over one million copies and becoming a best-seller for the NES. It was followed the same year with The Simpsons: Bart vs. the World.

== Plot and gameplay ==
Bart vs. the Space Mutants is a 2D side-scrolling platformer. In the single-player game, Bart Simpson is the only one who knows of the aliens' secret plan due to an unlikely quirk that he discovers when using his X-ray glasses, which he ordered from an ad on the last page of a comic book. It turns out that the X-ray specs, which Bart procured to see the nakedness of girls through their clothes, also exposed certain Springfield characters as being possessed by Space Mutants.

With this knowledge of the aliens' secret plan, Bart has to stop them from collecting the items they need to build their "ultimate weapon" to take over the world. There are five levels, in which Bart must collect or destroy a certain number of these items (purple objects in the first level, hats in the second, balloons in the third, exit signs in the fourth, and nuclear rods in the fifth). If Bart loses a life he says "Eat my shorts!" Another objective of Bart vs. the Space Mutants is to help Bart convince the other members of the Simpson family about the aliens' existence so that they will help him during the levels. This is achieved when Bart defeats a disguised space mutant, whereupon he collects a letter. Should he spell out the first name of a family member, said member will aid him in the boss battle. The five stages are the streets of Springfield, the Springfield Mall, Krustyland Amusement Park, a natural history museum, and the Springfield Nuclear Power Plant. If Bart exhausts all his lives, an end scene will be shown depending on what stage it took place, where the aliens gloat over their victory and/or mock Bart. If Bart completes the game, an end scene will be shown where the enraged aliens vow never to return to Earth, but try to accept defeat graciously and do something to pay their respects to the boy who thwarted them. Six months later, the Simpsons are vacationing in South Dakota when they notice a fifth face on Mount Rushmore that looks like Bart's.

In order to get to some of the items and progress through the game, Bart must use equipment such as rockets and cherry bombs, which are bought with coins that can be collected by getting rid of aliens. Bart is controlled on foot and on a skateboard. To get rid of aliens, which are disguised as real humans, he needs to jump on their heads, although some are just regular humans. The game increases in difficulty with each level, and Bart meets up with a boss at the end of the first four. The levels use elements of The Simpsons and some of the television humor appears in the game: for example, in the first level Bart can make a prank call to the bartender Moe in order for him to run outside so that the player can spray paint his purple apron (an example of an item that the aliens need) into a red color that the aliens do not want. The game includes some minigames.

== Development and release ==
Bart vs. the Space Mutants is the first video game based on the animated television series The Simpsons, and includes the theme song from the show. The game was designed by Garry Kitchen, who previously developed Keystone Kapers and Pressure Cooker for Activision. Imagineering developed Bart vs. the Space Mutants for the Nintendo Entertainment System, whereas Arc Developments handled all conversions.

Kitchen stated the game was offered to him by Greg Fischback of Acclaim as the Simpsons shorts were airing on The Tracey Ullman Show in 1989, asking him to look into them as a property to develop it into a game. Kitchen stated the biggest hurdle in development was time as Acclaim really wanted the game to be available before Christmas. Full production began in May 1990, and would finish in December 1990, missing the Christmas deadline. The story of Bart vs. the Space Mutants was written by Barry Marx, a friend from Columbia University. Due to not having access to pre-release Simpsons material, the developers made sure to watch the episodes as they premiered in order to include as many references to the series as possible.

It was published in 1991 by Acclaim for the NES and by Ocean Software for the Atari ST, Amiga, ZX Spectrum, Commodore 64, and Amstrad CPC. It was also released in 1992 for the Sega Genesis, Master System, and Game Gear under Acclaim's Flying Edge label. A Japanese Mega Drive version was advertised alongside Krusty's Fun House, but never released.

== Reception ==
Reception

Review scores
Publication	Score
AllGame	4/5
Amiga Power	78% (Amiga)
Computer and Video Games	8.3/10 (Amiga)
Electronic Gaming Monthly	7/10, 8/10, 7/10, 6/10
GameZone	84% (SMD)
VideoGames & Computer Entertainment	8/10
Entertainment Weekly	B

Awards
Publication	Award
Crash	Crash Smash
Sinclair User	SU Classic
Your Sinclair	Megagame

The game was a best-seller. It sold 1 million copies at $40 each.

Reviews of Bart vs. the Space Mutants have been mixed. Many critics have described the game as difficult. An author for the Italian newspaper la Repubblica said the levels are not easy, and the Swedish edition of Sega Force described the game as both difficult and boring. Nintendo Power wrote: "Bart Simpson has finally made it to the NES from Acclaim. His adventure, though, is anything but a game for underachievers. This game is very challenging and could be frustratingly so to some players. The tasks that you must perform to complete the adventure require patience and skill."

The NES version of Bart vs. the Space Mutants received a B rating from Lou Kesten of Entertainment Weekly, who noted that "the biggest drawback of this game is its brutally difficult opening section. However, what makes it challenging are clever strategic puzzles rather than thumb-bruising acrobatics. Bart tests reflexes and imagination in a way all too rarely seen in video games."

James Leach of Your Sinclair gave the ZX Spectrum game a 92/100 rating, writing that "I'm really into this game. As far as I can see, it's got everything it should have. It's fast, it's easy in places and dead wicked in others and it's got a massive amount of variety. What more could you want? ... The graphics are very cartoony, as you'd expect, and there's pots of colour." Leach also noted that the idea of including minigames in Bart vs. the Space Mutants "is pretty inspired, and makes the game even more fun." A reviewer for Crash also gave the ZX Spectrum version a positive review, with a 91/100 rating. He praised the variety and gameplay of the game, and noted that "while it may sound pretty basic [...] it's when you start discovering things, making use of objects, finding hidden treasures that it really comes alive. And achieving an objective is satisfying because the route to completion can be pretty tough (especially some of the platform elements)." The reviewer also noted that "if you're a Simpsons fan the game's incredibly appealing, the graphics all reflect Matt Groening's cartoon very well. And how much of a fan you are dictates how much you're really going to enjoy this [game]. Non-fans can still get loads of entertainment, but some parts may be frustrating if you're not into the characters."

In 2009, 1UP.com editor Bob Mackey reviewed the NES game in 1UP.com's official Retro Gaming Blog. Although he liked the first level for "mixing an impressive amount of references from the show with gameplay that has a pinch of point-and-click adventure in", he expressed his dislike for the other levels: "Unfortunately, either due to lack of ideas or lack of time (most likely the latter), the rest of Bart vs. the Space Mutants doesn't quite live up to the promise or ambition of the first level; the remaining four stages devolve into a frustrating and generic exercise in platforming that lacks all of the little references that made the beginning of the game somewhat authentic." Mackey described the game's controls as "terrible".

Kitchen stated that he "thought the majority of the game played very well, challenging but not in an unfair way" while noting the later levels could use more tuning, but failed to get it due to scheduling. He stated that "building a game against a fixed ship date is never a good idea so I do believe the game's quality suffered a bit because of compromises we made in an attempt to get it done in record time."
