= The Simpsons: Bart's Nightmare =

1992 video game

- European Mega Drive box art
- Developer: Sculptured Software
- Publisher: Acclaim Entertainment (Note: Released under the Flying Edge brand name on the Genesis.)
- Programmer: Ken Grant
- Composers: Super NES; Mark Ganus; Kingsley Thurber; Genesis/Mega Drive; Dean Morrell
- Series: The Simpsons
- Platforms: Super NES, Genesis/Mega Drive
- Release: Super NES: NA: September 1992; EU: January 9, 1993; JP: February 26, 1993; Genesis/Mega Drive: NA: August 1993; EU: October 1993
- Genre: Platform
- Mode: Single-player

The Simpsons: Bart's Nightmare is a 1992 platform video game based on the animated television series The Simpsons. Developed by Sculptured Software and published by Acclaim Entertainment, it was first released for the Super Nintendo Entertainment System in 1992, followed by the Sega Genesis in 1993. The first half of the game follows Bart Simpson as he tries to find his missing homework pages in order to escape a bizarre dream world, while the second half consists of minigames.

== Gameplay ==
Screenshot of the Genesis version, showing the main hub

The game is split into two parts. The first is set on a street (probably Evergreen Terrace, but referred to as Windy World). Bart walks around and has to find five pages of his homework while avoiding enemies such as living mailboxes and various characters from the show. Power-ups that Bart can collect include bubble gum (with which he can blow bubbles to repel enemies or collect floating blue Zs to restore his health), watermelon seeds (which he can spit at enemies to defeat them or make them change direction), pillows (which create a new health bar for him if he runs out of Zs), and his skateboard (which temporarily increases his speed as well as restoring and extending his health bar the longer he is on it). Jimbo and his gang will coerce Bart into strolling with them, causing Bart to lose control of his movements and have to move with them, taking damage as he does. Hitting a flying saxophone will summon Lisa Simpson with fairy wings to sprinkle fairy dust on Jimbo and his gang and transform them into rats, freeing Bart. However, if Bart is by himself, the Lisa pixie will turn him into a frog who cannot attack. If Bart catches a kiss blown to him by an old lady, it will revert him to his human form.

Principal Skinner occasionally appears and tries to dress Bart in his Sunday school suit. If the player walks into Skinner, Bart will change appearance and become very slow and not be able to fire at enemies; however, the suit will also protect Bart from taking damage from all enemies (save for Jimbo and his gang). The suit wears off after a certain amount of time, or when Bart jumps in a mud puddle.

When a page is found in Windy World, the player can jump onto it, whereupon Bart shrinks down on the page, and the player has to choose one out of a selection of two randomly chosen minigames. The player must point Bart to one of the two color-coded doors to play a minigame and retrieve a lost page of Bart's homework. The doors and games include:

- The green door: Bartzilla, a two-part minigame where Bart must stomp through the streets of Springfield and destroy the army with fire breath and visual lasers. After being zapped by a shrink ray, Bart climbs the Springfield State Building and fights "Homer Kong" and "Momthra."
- The Violet door: A journey into Bart's bloodstream, where Bart must use an air pump to inflate and destroy bad germs and collect five Smilin' Joe Fissions (a character from the first-season episode "Homer's Odyssey").
- The yellow door: Itchy and Scratchy, where Bart is being attacked by the "team up" duo, as well as various other household objects that become enemies (the oven and vacuum cleaners shoot fire, the telephone explodes, Marge's picture drops eyeballs, etc.). All fire-based attacks are instantly fatal, with Bart crumbling to ashes. This is the only minigame divided into two separate parts; Bart must locate another page in Windy World before playing the second minigame.
- The blue door: Bartman, where Bart flies over Springfield as a superhero. Along the way he fights many bosses, including Sherri and Terri in a hot air balloon, Barney Gumble on a pink elephant, Waylon Smithers in a blimp (Bart faces him twice), and eventually Mr. Burns in a biplane. Not only must he avoid the enemies, Bart must avoid clouds of radioactive gas. Bart also receives bottled Squishees from Apu on a magic carpet in this level, which serves to raise his energy bar.
- The orange door: Idaho Simpson, where Bart must make his way through the balancing columns in "Temple of Maggie". There are two stages, each with a page reward at the end.

The minigames can be played in any order; the pages awarded will be 1 through 8 depending on the order they were retrieved.

Upon either failing the respective minigame (and not getting the page back) or completing the minigame (and receiving the page as a reward), the screen will flash back to Bart's room at night, which shows the number of points the player has and the number of pages collected, while Bart snores. Once a minigame is completed, it cannot be played again. Both doors will be the same color if there is only one minigame to complete.

The game ends when Bart loses all of his Zs (Windy World will be covered in a white fog, suggesting Bart's nightmare is nearly almost over) and takes damage one more time, or if he successfully completes all the minigames. Depending on how many pages Bart retrieves and how many points he gets, he is awarded a letter grade. Bart will hold it up for the player to see, and then slightly different endings are shown where the player sees the Simpson family's reactions to Bart's grade by having the paper affixed to the refrigerator (which is strikingly similar to the final scene in "Bart Gets an 'F'"). If Bart is given an "F", is the worst grade, the entire family is mad at him except Maggie, with slightly higher grades having at least Homer is pleased with Bart's hard work. Lisa is always annoyed with Bart's work unless the player manages to get Bart an outstanding grade, in which case she will look at Bart's paper in disbelief and shock.

This minigame-oriented gameplay gives the game an arcade style. Although much of the game could be categorized as a platformer, some of the minigames could fit in the shoot 'em up genre, particularly the Bartman and Bartzilla stages.

== Plot ==
When Bart Simpson was about to enter the fourth grade, he had to turn in his homework, but he fell asleep in the middle of working on it and had a dream in which his eight assignments were blown out the window, and he began to dream about retrieving them so he wouldn't fail the class.

== Development ==
Bart's Nightmare was developed by Sculptured Software and chiefly designed by Bill Williams. Company meddling during the production of the game prompted Williams to leave the video game industry. The Simpsons creator Matt Groening was involved with the development of earlier video games based on the series, having final approval on all storylines and character designs. For Bart's Nightmare, Groening altered the color of Bart's eyes, as he felt they were originally too yellow.

== Reception ==
Reception

Review scores
Publication	Score
Consoles +	SMD: 55%
Computer and Video Games	SNES: 90/100
Famitsu	SNES: 6/10, 9/10, 6/10, 7/10
GameZone	SNES: 80/100
Joystick	SNES: 79%
Nintendo Power	SNES: 15/20
Super Play	SNES: 91%
Total!	SNES: 53%
Control	SNES: 78%
Mega	SMD: 35%
N-Force	SNES: 87/100
Super Gamer	SNES: 73%
Super Pro	SNES: 80/100

Entertainment Weekly wrote: "Falling asleep while doing his homework, Bart has to battle with the demons of his subconscious—imagining himself as, among others, a rampaging green Bartzilla and a caped Bartman. A surreal blast." Super Gamer reviewed the SNES version and gave a review score of 73%, writing: "It looks as good as the cartoon, but sadly playability is irritatingly tough and not as imaginative as the graphics." Nintendo Power scored the SNES version 15/20, writing "the characters and situations in this adventure are very inventive. I like all of the things that Bart can do, but find him sometimes difficult to control."

The cartoony and colorful graphics, humor, and scenarios were praised as imaginative, well-animated and reflective of the TV series. The playability, particularly with the control, was poorly-received as awkward and difficult. Reviewing for the first issue of Super Play, Jonathan Davies found all of the sub-games "absolutely brilliant" and smartly designed, exceeding his expectations of a multi-sub-game product. Total! was more mixed, only considering some of the sub-games well-done.
