= UGO Networks =

American website (1997, last updated 2013)

- Website type: News
- Owner: IGN Entertainment
- Website: www.ugo.com
- Launched: 1997
- Current status: Inactive, defunct early 2013

UGO Entertainment, Inc. was a website that provided coverage of online media in entertainment, targeting males aged 18–34. The company was based in New York, New York, United States.

== History ==
The company started in 1997 as Unified Gamers Online, billed in directories as a "hand-picked network of professionally managed gaming sites and services." In 1997, founder Chris Sherman hired Ken Margolis Associates to manage sales and marketing to the Game Industry. Chris sold UGO to Actionworld, Inc., a subsidiary of InterWorld, which incorporated the company in the state of Delaware in April, 1997. That same year, InterWorld spun off the company "in order to permit UGO Networks to build a separate management team...and to position UGO Networks to seek private parts equity financing."

In 1998, UGO—then described as "the largest independent gaming community on the Internet"—created the prestigious UGO E3 Awards, now the Game Critics Awards, to recognize high quality video game entertainment. In 1999, UGO changed its name to UnderGround Online as part of its efforts to expand its target audience. The company streamed various forms of media entertainment on its website as well as offering articles on topics of interest to its target audience. Topics included comics, television, music and film. Its main competitors included CNET Networks, IGN, and Yahoo!. On July 24, 2007 it was announced that Hearst Corporation would acquire UGO Entertainment to expand its interactive media division. On January 6, 2009, UGO Entertainment acquired 1UP.com and its associated sites from publisher Ziff Davis.

In May 2011, IGN Entertainment announced that it would acquire UGO from Hearst in a cash and stock. At the same time, its parent company News Corporation also announced that the profitable IGN division would be spun off into a new company. In March 2012, UGO ceased to exist as a staffed website and was dormant for a short period. Later in 2012, UGO.com relaunched as a self-described "pop culture comedy site", which focused on producing original videos about movies, comics and videogames with a humorous tone. On February 4, 2013, UGO.com was purchased as part of the IGN network of websites acquired by Ziff Davis, and was shut down on February 21, 2013.

== The network ==
The UGO Networks featured websites such as Hero Machine, a Flash-based website allowing to create one's own superhero and share it; Studio UGO, featuring exclusive live music performances; Actress Archives, a website focusing on actress and female entertainer related news, photo galleries, and videos; and Caster's Realm, a blog that featured news and information on MMORPGs.
