= Bart Simpson =

Fictional character from The Simpsons franchise

- The Simpsons character
- First appearance: "Good Night"; The Tracey Ullman Show; April 19, 1987
- Created by: Matt Groening
- Designed by: Matt Groening
- Voiced by: Nancy Cartwright

In-universe information
- Full name: Bartholomew Jo-Jo Simpson
- Occupation: 4th-grade student at Springfield Elementary School
- Family: Homer Simpson (father); Marge Simpson (mother); Lisa Simpson (sister); Maggie Simpson (sister)
- Relatives: Abe Simpson (grandfather); Mona Simpson (grandmother; deceased); Clancy Bouvier (grandfather; deceased); Jacqueline Bouvier (grandmother); Patty Bouvier (aunt); Selma Bouvier (aunt); Herbert Powell (half-uncle); Abbey (half-aunt)
- Home: 742 Evergreen Terrace, Springfield, United States
- Nationality: American

Bartholomew Jo-Jo "Bart" Simpson is one of the main characters in the American animated television series The Simpsons, part of the titular family. Widely regarded as one of the greatest fictional characters of all time, he was named by Time as one of the most important people of the 20th century in 1998.

Bart made his television debut in the short "Good Night" on The Tracey Ullman Show on April 19, 1987. Cartoonist Matt Groening created and designed Bart while waiting in the lobby of James L. Brooks's office. Initially called to pitch a series of shorts based on his comic strip Life in Hell, Groening developed a new set of characters. Unlike the other Simpson family members, who were named after Groening's relatives, Bart's name is an anagram of brat. After two years on The Tracey Ullman Show, the Simpson family received their own series, which premiered on Fox on December 17, 1989. Bart has appeared in every episode of The Simpsons except "Four Great Women and a Manicure".

Always ten years old, Bart is the eldest child and only son of Homer and Marge Simpson and the brother of Lisa and Maggie. Known for his penchant for mischief, rebelliousness and disrespect for authority, Bart's most iconic traits include his chalkboard gags in the opening sequence, prank calls to Moe's Tavern, and catchphrases like "Eat my shorts", "¡Ay, caramba!", "Don't have a cow, man!", and "I'm Bart Simpson, who the hell are you?". Bart has also appeared in The Simpsons'-related media, including video games, the 2007 film version of the series, The Simpsons Ride, commercials, comic books, and an extensive line of merchandise. Nancy Cartwright, Bart's voice actor, intended to audition for the role of Lisa, and Yeardley Smith auditioned for Bart. Smith's voice was deemed too high-pitched for a boy, while Cartwright found Lisa less appealing as a character and opted to try out for Bart—a role she felt better suited her.

Bart's protagonist status during the show's first two seasons led to "Bartmania", which spawned Bart-themed merchandise touting his rebellious persona and pride in underachieving. The traits were criticized by parents and educators, who viewed him as a negative influence on children. By the third season, Homer became the show's figurehead character and the series shifted its focus to the family as a whole, although Bart remains a breakout character. He is considered one of the most iconic fictional television characters of the 1990s. Entertainment Weekly named him Entertainer of the Year in 1990. Cartwright has received accolades for her portrayal of Bart, including a Primetime Emmy Award in 1992 and an Annie Award in 1995. In 2000, Bart and the rest of the Simpson family were honored with a star on the Hollywood Walk of Fame.

== Role in The Simpsons ==
The Simpsons employs a floating timeline, in which characters either do not age or age minimally; the show is always presumed to take place in the present year. Always ten years old, Bartholomew, best known by his short-form name Bart, is the eldest child and only son of Homer and Marge Simpson; he has two younger sisters, Lisa and Maggie. In several episodes of The Simpsons, events have been tied to specific times, though these timelines are sometimes contradicted in later episodes. In "I Married Marge" (season three, 1991), Bart's birth is placed in the early 1980s. In "Simpsorama" (season 26, 2014), Bart states his birthday as February 23, while The Bart Book by series creator Matt Groening lists it as April 1. In "Bart's Birthday" (season 36, 2024), Bart, in a hypothetical series finale, celebrates his eleventh birthday, much to his dismay, as he has always identified as being ten years old.

Bart lived with his parents in Springfield's Lower East Side before the family purchased their first home. When Lisa was born, Bart initially felt jealous of the attention she received but soon warmed to her when her first word turned out to be "Bart". Bart's first day of school occurred in the early 1990s. Initially excited, his enthusiasm was quickly crushed by an indifferent teacher, prompting Marge to worry about him. During recess, Bart befriended Milhouse and began entertaining classmates with gestures and rude jokes. Principal Skinner warned Bart, "You've just started school, and the path you choose now may be the one you follow for the rest of your life! Now, what do you say?" Bart replied, "Eat my shorts". However, the episode "That 90's Show" (season 19, 2008) contradicted much of this timeline, revealing that Homer and Marge were childless during the early 1990s.

Bart's hobbies include skateboarding, watching television—particularly The Krusty the Clown Show and its segment The Itchy & Scratchy Show—reading comic books, especially Radioactive Man, playing video games, and causing general mischief. His favorite movies are Jaws and the Star Wars trilogy, while his favorite board games include Hippo in the House, The Game of Lent, and Citizenship. Throughout the series, Bart has been a student at Springfield Elementary School, where he is part of Edna Krabappel's fourth-grade class. Although too young for full-time work, Bart has taken on several part-time jobs over the years. He works as a bartender at Fat Tony's social club in "Bart the Murderer" (season three, 1991); as Krusty the Clown's assistant in "Bart Gets Famous" (season five, 1994); as a doorman in Springfield's burlesque house, the Maison Derrière, in "Bart After Dark" (season eight, 1996); and briefly owns his own factory in "Homer's Enemy" (season eight, 1997).

== Character ==
=== Creation ===
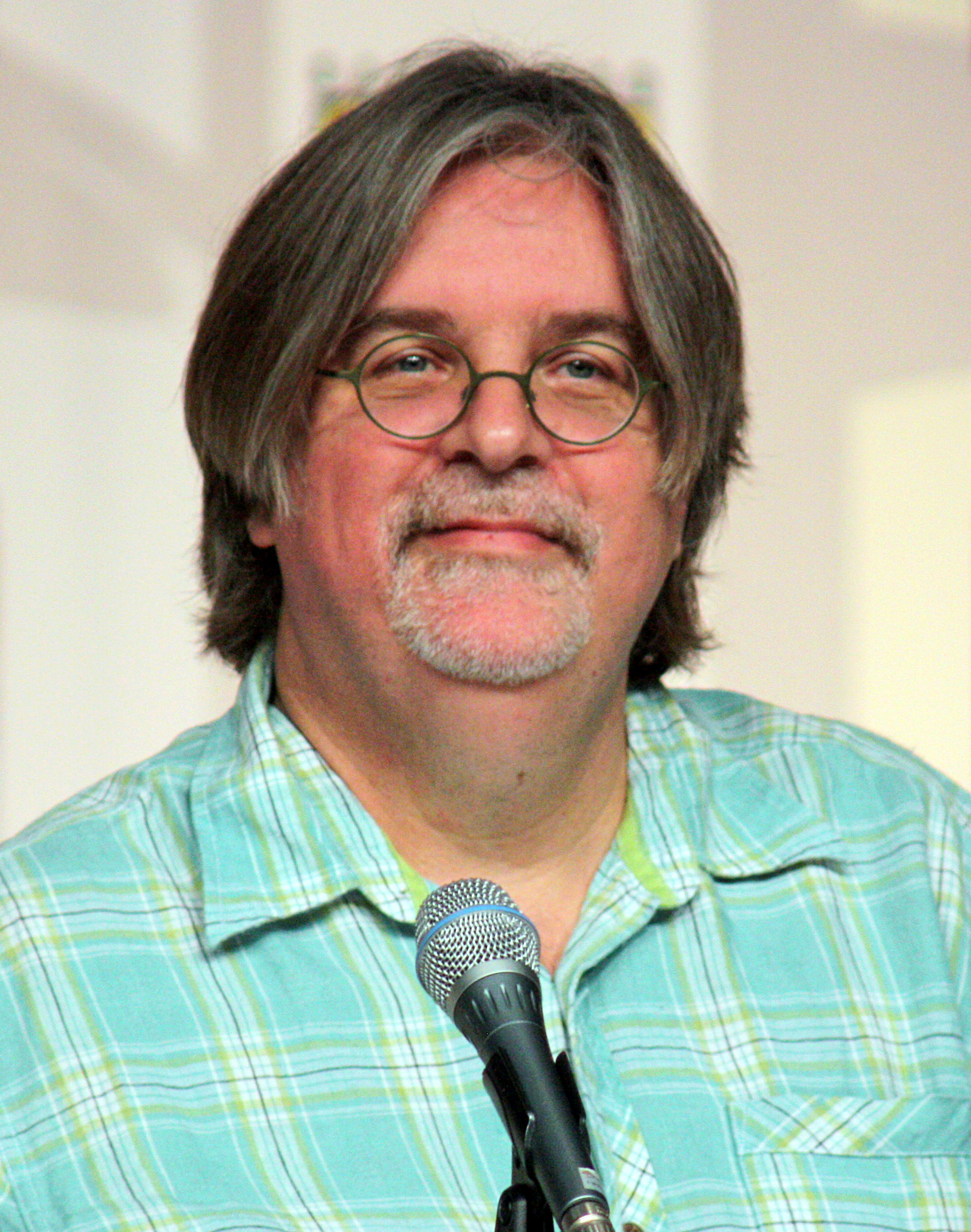
Matt Groening (pictured in 2009) conceived Bart in 1987.

Matt Groening conceived Bart and the rest of the Simpson family in 1987 while waiting in the lobby of producer James L. Brooks's office. Groening was invited to pitch a series of animated shorts for The Tracey Ullman Show and initially planned to adapt his comic strip, Life in Hell. Realizing that adapting the strip would require him to relinquish publication rights, he decided to create something new. Groening sketched a concept for a dysfunctional family, naming the characters after members of his family. For the rebellious son, he chose "Bart", an anagram of brat, instead of his own name because he felt that "Matt" would not "go over well in a pitch meeting". Bart's middle initial "J" is an homage to the animated characters Bullwinkle J. Moose and Rocket J. Squirrel from The Rocky and Bullwinkle Show, who were named after creator Jay Ward. Although numerous interpretations of his middle initial have been given, Groening said that Bart's full middle name is "Jo-Jo", which was chosen by Cartwright during a recording session.

According to The Oregonian, Bart was conceived as "a much milder, troubled youth given to existential angst who talks to himself"; the character was changed due to Nancy Cartwright's voice acting. Groening has credited numerous sources as inspirations for Bart's character. His older brother, Mark Groening, influenced Bart's rebellious attitude. Mark introduced him to a variety of comics, including Mad (when it was still a comic), Donald Duck, Uncle Scrooge, Little Lulu, and Tales From the Crypt; all were sources of inspiration for Matt. Bart was envisioned as an exaggerated version of a typical misbehaving child, combining the extreme traits of characters such as Tom Sawyer and Huckleberry Finn. Groening described Bart as "what would happen if the son of Eddie Haskell [from Leave It to Beaver] got his own show". He was disappointed with the premise of Dennis the Menace, which inspired him to create a character who was genuinely mischievous. Bart first appeared with the Simpson family on April 19, 1987, in The Tracey Ullman Show short "Good Night". On December 17, 1989, the shorts were developed into The Simpsons, a half-hour series on the Fox Broadcasting Company, where Bart and the Simpson family became the central characters.

=== Design ===
Bart in his first televised appearance in "Good Night"

The Simpson family was designed to be easily recognizable in silhouette. The characters were initially crudely drawn because Groening submitted rough sketches to the animators, expecting them to refine the designs, but they simply traced over his drawings. Bart's early design, featured in the first shorts, included hair with spikes of varying length; this was later standardized to nine spikes of equal length. Groening primarily worked in black-and-white at the time and, without considering the eventual use of color, designed Bart's spikes to look like an extension of his head. This design feature is not replicated in other characters, although some background characters in the first few seasons shared his spiky hairline.

Bart's head was described by director Mark Kirkland as a basic rectangular shape resembling a coffee can. Homer's head is also rectangular, with a dome on top, while spheres define the heads of Marge, Lisa, and Maggie. In the season-seven (1995) episode "Treehouse of Horror VI", Bart, alongside Homer, was first rendered as a three-dimensional character in the episode's "Homer^{3}" segment. The computer animation was by Pacific Data Images. Designing Bart's 3D model, the animators did not know how they would depict his hair; realizing that vinyl Bart dolls were in production, they purchased one to use as a model.

=== Voice ===
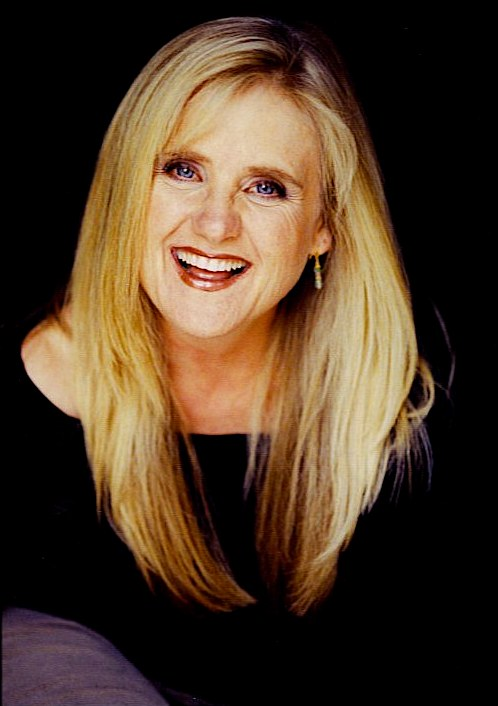
Nancy Cartwright (pictured in 2007) voices Bart.

Bart's voice is provided by Nancy Cartwright, who also voices several other child characters on The Simpsons who include Nelson Muntz, Ralph Wiggum, Todd Flanders, and Kearney Zzyzwicz. After Dan Castellaneta and Julie Kavner were cast as Homer and Marge due to their roles on The Tracey Ullman Show, the producers held auditions for Bart and Lisa. Yeardley Smith initially auditioned for Bart, but casting director Bonita Pietila felt that her voice was too high-pitched. Smith recalled, "I always sounded too much like a girl. I read two lines as Bart, and they said, 'Thanks for coming!'". She was subsequently cast as Lisa instead. On March 13, 1987, Cartwright auditioned for Lisa. Discovering that Lisa was described only as the "middle child", with little personality at the time, she became interested in Bart, who was characterized as "devious, underachieving, school-hating, irreverent, [and] clever". Groening allowed her to audition for Bart, and offered her the role immediately after hearing her read. Cartwright is the only one of the six primary Simpsons cast members who had formal voice-acting training before joining the show.

According to The Guardian, Cartwright's speaking voice has "no obvious traces of Bart". The voice she uses for Bart came naturally to her, since she had incorporated elements of it on shows like My Little Pony, Snorks, and Pound Puppies. Cartwright described Bart's voice as easy to create: "Some characters take a little bit more effort, upper respiratory control, whatever it is technically. But Bart is easy to do. I can just slip into that without difficulty". She typically records five or six takes of each line for variety, allowing producers more options to work with. Even in flashforward episodes, Cartwright continues to voice Bart; in the episode "Lisa's Wedding" (season six, 1995), Bart's voice was electronically pitched lower to reflect his age. Despite Bart's fame, Cartwright is seldom recognized in public. When she is recognized and asked to use Bart's voice in front of children, she declines because it "freaks [them] out". During the first season of The Simpsons, Fox Network barred Cartwright from interviews to avoid the revelation that Bart was voiced by a woman.

Cartwright was paid US$30,000 per episode for her work on The Simpsons until 1998. A pay dispute arose that year, during which Fox threatened to replace the six main voice actors and began preparing for new casting. The conflict was resolved, and Cartwright's salary increased to $125,000 per episode. The voice cast pushed for higher wages in 2004, seeking $360,000 per episode. The dispute was soon settled, and Cartwright's pay was increased to $250,000 per episode. In 2008, further negotiations increased the cast's salaries to about $400,000 per episode. Fox demanded production-cost reductions in 2011, threatening to cancel the series if costs were not cut. In response, Cartwright and the other main cast members agreed to a 30-percent pay reduction, lowering their per-episode earnings to just over $300,000. Cartwright was paid $315,000 per episode by 2016, which, according to Variety, made her one of the highest-paid voice actors.

=== Hallmarks ===
In the opening sequence of many episodes of The Simpsons, the camera zooms in on Springfield Elementary School, where Bart is shown writing lines on a chalkboard. This scene, known as the "chalkboard gag", varies by episode. The messages often include political humor, such as "The First Amendment does not cover burping", pop culture references like "I can't see dead people", and meta-commentary such as "I am not a 32-year-old woman" or "Nobody reads these anymore". The animators create the gags quickly, and they sometimes reflect current events. In the episode "Homer the Heretic" (season four, 1992), the chalkboard gag read "I will not defame New Orleans"; it was an apology for a controversial song in the previous week's episode, "A Streetcar Named Marge", which described the city as a "home of pirates, drunks, and whores".

An early hallmark of Bart's character was his prank calls to Moe's Tavern, where he would ask owner Moe Szyslak for a fictitious person with a gag name. Moe would try to find the person, eventually realizing it was a prank and (unaware that Bart was the caller) responding with angry threats. The calls were inspired by the Tube Bar recordings, a series of prank calls to bar owner Louis "Red" Deutsch (whose profane reactions influenced Moe's violent temperament). The calls first appeared in "Homer's Odyssey" (season one, 1990), the third episode to air. It became increasingly difficult for the writers to create new fake names and Moe's responses, leading to the pranks being phased out as a regular feature by the fourth season; however, they have occasionally resurfaced in later episodes.

The catchphrase "Eat my shorts" originated as an ad-lib by Cartwright during one of the show's early table readings, inspired by an incident during her high-school years. While performing with the marching band at Fairmont High School, the group chanted "Eat my shorts" instead of their usual cheer ("Fairmont West! Fairmont West!") The phrase may also refer to The Breakfast Club (1985), in which John Bender says it to Principal Vernon. Bart's other notable catchphrases include "¡Ay, caramba!" and "Don't have a cow!". The former was inspired by a Portuguese flamenco dancer; the latter, popularized during the 1950s, originated from the British phrase "Don't have kittens". Both were prominently featured on merchandise such as T-shirts during the show's early seasons. Another catchphrase, "Cowabunga", was borrowed from Chief Thunderthud of The Howdy Doody Show.

Bart's nude scene in The Simpsons Movie (2007).

Bart frequently appears nude in The Simpsons, often by mooning. In The Simpsons Movie (2007), he skateboards nude. Although various objects obscure his genitalia throughout the scene, his penis is briefly visible. This scene was among the first created for the film, but producers were initially concerned that it might result in an R rating. However, the Motion Picture Association of America ultimately rated the film PG-13 for "irreverent humor throughout". The scene was later recognized by Entertainment Weekly as one of 30 Unforgettable Nude Scenes.

=== Personality ===
Bart's disregard for authority has been compared to America's founding fathers, and been described as a modern fusion of Tom Sawyer and Huckleberry Finn. In his book Planet Simpson, Chris Turner characterizes Bart as a nihilist who has the philosophical view that life lacks inherent meaning, purpose, or value. Bart's rebellious nature makes him disruptive at Springfield Elementary School, where he identifies as an underachiever. He frequently clashes with his teacher, Ms. Krabappel, and Principal Skinner. Bart acknowledges his poor performance at school: "I am dumb, okay? Dumb as a post! Think I'm happy about it?" Much like his father, his mental processes are often illogical and absurd; he once believed that if he reincarnated as a butterfly, he could burn the school down without suspicion, imagining he could hold a gas can as a butterfly. Bart thinks that writing his name in wet cement will leave people wondering how he did it in hardened cement. "Brother's Little Helper" (season eleven, 1999) reveals that Bart has attention deficit disorder. His intelligence may be impacted by the hereditary "Simpson gene", which affects males in his family. He also has a fear of heights, revealed in "Kosmic Krusty" (season 38, 2026). Despite his misbehavior and selfishness, he has moments of integrity and compassion and occasionally helps Ms. Krabappel and Principal Skinner.

Bart is a really good boy. He's just mischievous. He's not bad, like characters who followed him such as [Eric] Cartman (South Park) or Beavis and Butthead. Bart can do some nasty things, but they seem so tame, by today's standards. What was shocking 19 years ago, when the show started, isn't the least bit shocking today. Bart hasn't changed.

— — Nancy Cartwright

Bart's mischievous nature and Homer's often-negligent, incompetent behavior create a turbulent, volatile, and abusive relationship between them. Bart frequently calls Homer by his first name rather than "Dad", and Homer often refers to him dismissively as "the boy". Homer's short temper leads to cartoonishly-violent outbursts, such as impulsively strangling Bart. Marge is the more caring, understanding and nurturing parent, although she acknowledges that Bart is "a handful" and is often embarrassed by his antics. In the episode "Marge Be Not Proud" (season seven, 1995), Marge struggles with adjusting her parenting style after Bart is caught shoplifting; she becomes more distant to avoid over-mothering, which causes Bart to feel guilty and try to make amends. Despite his rebellious attitude, Bart occasionally endures humiliation to please his mother. Marge frequently defends him, understanding his complexity. She describes him as her "special little guy", saying, "I know Bart can be a handful, but I also know what he's like inside. He's got a spark. It's not a bad thing [...] of course, it makes him do bad things".

Bart shares a sibling rivalry with his younger sister, Lisa. Although they often disagree—sometimes physically—they have a deep bond and care for one another. Bart often apologizes when he goes too far and recognizes Lisa's superior intellect, frequently seeking her advice about problems. He is a popular "cool kid" at school, and has many friends; his closest is Milhouse Van Houten. His influence on Milhouse is often negative, leading them into mischief. In "Homer Defined" (season three, 1991), Milhouse's mother forbids him from playing with Bart due to his bad influence; Bart is unfazed until he realizes how much he values their friendship, and Marge convinces Mrs. Van Houten to reconsider.

Bart is a fan of the children's television host Krusty the Clown, and has stated that "I've based my whole life on Krusty's teachings"; his room is filled with Krusty merchandise. Bart helps Krusty a number of times, thwarting Sideshow Bob's attempt to frame Krusty for armed robbery in "Krusty Gets Busted" (season one, 1990), reuniting Krusty with his estranged father in "Like Father, Like Clown", and helping Krusty relaunch his career with a comeback special in "Krusty Gets Kancelled". Bart's initial confrontation with Sideshow Bob in "Krusty Gets Busted" sparks a long-term rivalry. The writers developed Bob as an intelligent, obsessive antagonist, inspired by the dynamic between Wile E. Coyote and the Road Runner.

== Reception ==
=== Bartmania ===
Bart became one of television's most popular characters in 1990, sparking a cultural phenomenon known as "Bartmania". He became the most prominent Simpsons character on merchandise, particularly T-shirts; during the early 1990s, millions of Bart-themed T-shirts were sold. Bart's rebellious persona led some American public schools to ban T-shirts with sayings such as "I'm Bart Simpson. Who the hell are you?" and "Underachiever (and proud of it, man!)". A T-shirt with the latter caption is in the National Museum of American History. The popularity of Simpsons merchandise was a commercial success, generating $2 billion in revenue in its first 14 months of sales. Bart's appeal also inspired a thriving black market for counterfeit merchandise, particularly T-shirts. The items featured Bart with various slogans and redesigns, including "Teenage Mutant Ninja Bart", "Air Simpson Bart", and "RastaBart". Although Groening generally tolerated bootleg merchandise, he objected to a series of "Nazi Bart" shirts with Bart in Nazi uniforms or as a white power skinhead. 20th Century Fox sued Tom Metzger, the creator of the offensive designs, who agreed to cease production.

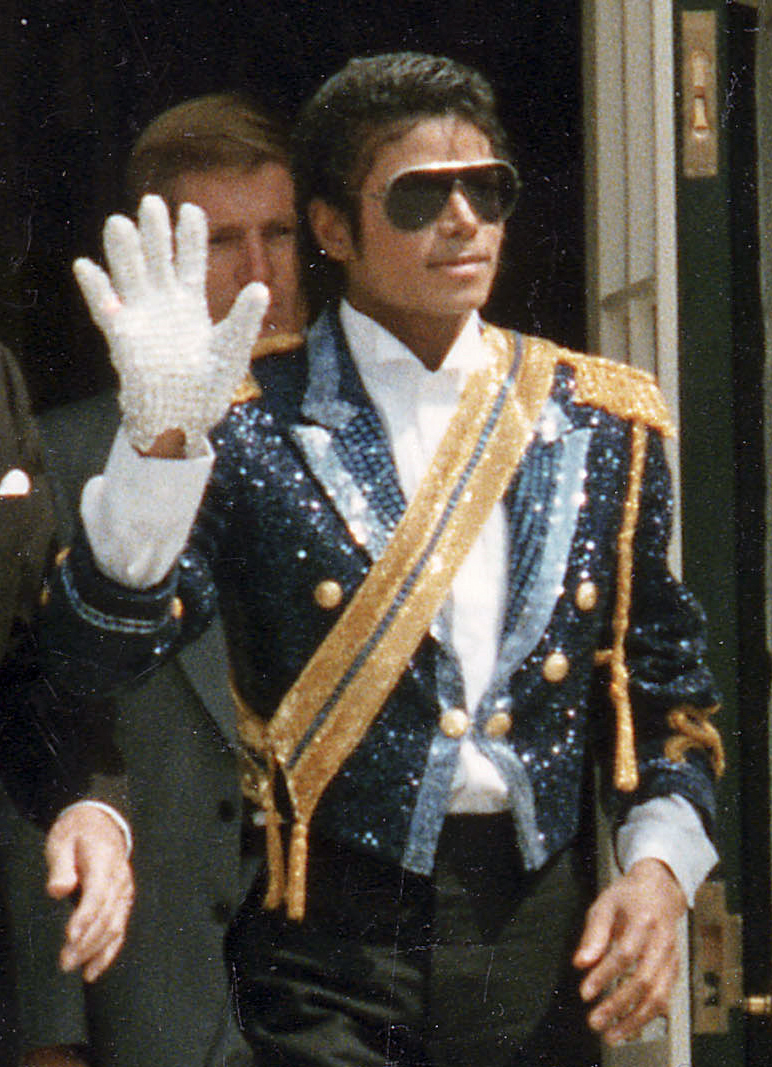
Michael Jackson (pictured in 1984) provided backing vocals for "Do the Bartman".

Bart was described as "television's king of 1990", "television's brightest new star", and an "undiminished smash". He was one of the most popular write-in candidates in the 1990 United States congressional, senatorial and gubernatorial elections, second in a number of areas only to Mickey Mouse among fictional characters. In the 1990 Macy's Thanksgiving Day Parade, Bart debuted as one of the giant helium-filled balloons for which the parade is known. This was noted in The Simpsons episode "Bart vs. Thanksgiving", which aired the day of the parade, where Homer tells Bart: "If you start building a balloon for every flash-in-the-pan cartoon character, you turn the parade into a farce!". Behind and unbeknownst to Homer, the television briefly shows a Bart Simpson balloon.

The album The Simpsons Sing the Blues was recorded in September 1990 and released in December. It peaked at number three on the Billboard 200, and was certified double platinum by the Recording Industry Association of America. The first single from the album was the pop rap song "Do the Bartman", performed by Cartwright and released on November 20, 1990. The song was written by Bryan Loren, a friend of Michael Jackson (who provided backing vocals on the track). Jackson was a fan of The Simpsons (especially Bart), and had called the producers offering to write Bart a single and make a guest appearance on the show. Jackson guest-starred in the episode "Stark Raving Dad" (season three, 1991) with the pseudonym John Jay Smith. Although "Do the Bartman" was never released as a single in the United States, it was successful in the United Kingdom; it was the number-one song for three weeks (February 16 to March 9, 1991), and was the year's fifth-best-selling song. It sold half a million copies, and was certified gold by the British Phonographic Industry on February 1, 1991.

=== Cultural influence and commendations ===
Bart has been described as one of the most iconic television characters of the 1990s, and is considered an American cultural icon. In 1990, Entertainment Weekly named him Entertainer of the Year, writing that "Bart has proved to be a rebel who's also a good kid, a terror who's easily terrorized, and a flake who astonishes us, and himself, with serious displays of fortitude". In 1998, Time included Bart on the magazine's list of the 100 most important people of the 20th century, the only fictional character on the list. He had appeared previously on the cover of Time's December 31, 1990, issue. In 1996, Bart was named 48th on TV Guide's list of "50 Greatest TV Stars of All Time". In 2002, he and Lisa were ranked eleventh on TV Guide's "Top 50 Greatest Cartoon Characters of All Time" list. In 2022, Paste writers ranked Bart the 26th-greatest cartoon character of all time.

From entertainment critics, Bart has received mostly positive reviews. Screen Rant's Dan Peeke praised him as the "best main character" in 2020, calling him "relatable" and saying that "everyone can relate to at least some element of his personality". In a 2024 review, Darryn King of Vulture called Bart a "back-talking, trouble-making, prank-calling, cherry-bomb-detonating, and, yes, graffiti-tagging cartoon creation, who was at the time fast becoming a cultural icon". A 2023 Collider review said that the episode "Bart Gets an 'F'" was a "turning point for the show, showing that Bart could be more than just a punchline while paving the way for future episodes that fleshed out his character". According to Erma Bombeck, "Kids need to know that somewhere in this world is a contemporary who can pull off all the things they can only fantasize about, someone who can stick it to their parents once in a while and still be permitted to live". In 2003, a survey of parents in the United Kingdom ranked Bart the most influential fictional character for children under age twelve.

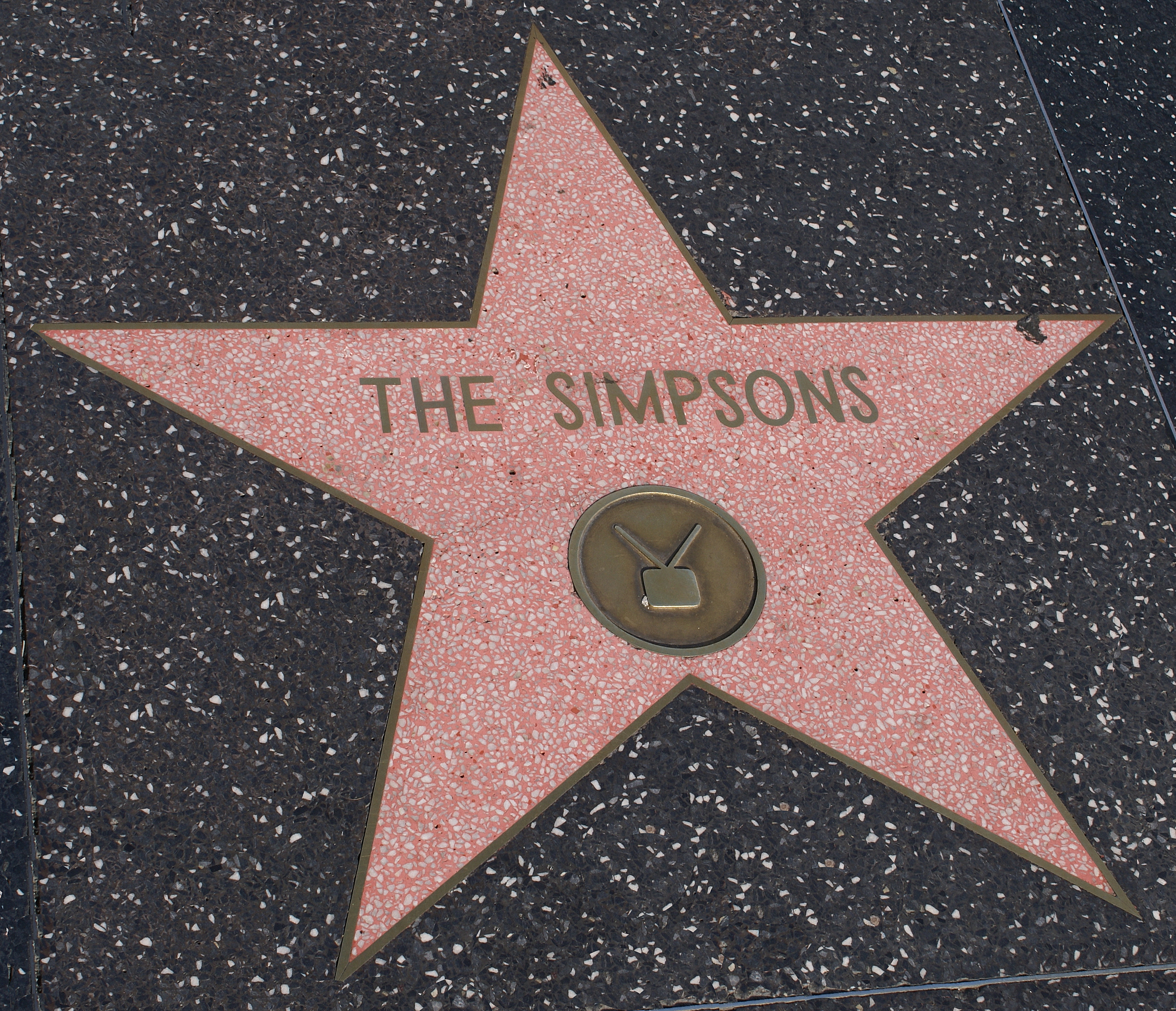
The Simpsons has been awarded a star on the Hollywood Walk of Fame.

Cartwright has received a number of awards for her performance. At the 44th Primetime Emmy Awards in 1992, she received a Primetime Emmy Award for Outstanding Voice-Over Performance for her portrayal of Bart in the season-three episode "Separate Vocations", sharing the award with five other voice actors from The Simpsons. Episodes featuring Bart have been nominated for the Primetime Emmy Award for Outstanding Animated Program, including "Radio Bart" in 1992, "Future-Drama" in 2005, and "Homer's Phobia" in 1997. Cartwright received an Annie Award for Voice Acting in the Field of Animation in 1995 for her work as Bart. In 2000, Bart and the rest of the Simpson family were recognized with a star on the Hollywood Walk of Fame at 7021 Hollywood Boulevard.

=== Negative influence on children ===
Bart's rebellious nature, often accompanied by a lack of consequences for his actions, led some parents, educators, and conservative groups to view him as a negative influence on children. Critics said that Bart's behavior made him a poor role model, with Robert Bianco of the Pittsburgh Post-Gazette describing him as a character who "outwits his parents and outtalks his teachers; in short, he's the child we wish we'd been, and fear our children will become". Educators expressed concern that Bart's "underachiever and proud of it" attitude and disdain for education posed a "threat to learning", and others called him "egotistical, aggressive, and mean-spirited". In response to criticism, producer James L. Brooks defended the character: "I'm very wary of television where everybody is supposed to be a role model. You don't run across that many role models in real life. Why should television be full of them?"

U.S. drug czar William Bennett visited a Pittsburgh drug treatment center in 1990 and saw a poster of Bart. Bennett said, "You guys aren't watching The Simpsons, are you? That's not going to help you any". Bennett later apologized, saying that he was "just kidding": "I'll sit down with the little spike head. We'll straighten this thing out." Bill Cosby called Bart a poor role model in a 1991 interview, describing him as "angry, confused, [and] frustrated". Groening responded, "That sums up Bart, all right. Most people are in a struggle to be normal. He thinks normal is very boring and does things that others just wished they dare do". U.S. president George H. W. Bush said in 1992, "We are going to keep on trying to strengthen the American family, to make American families a lot more like the Waltons and a lot less like the Simpsons". The show's writers then produced a short segment that aired three days later (before a rerun of "Stark Raving Dad"), in which Bart says: "Hey, we're just like the Waltons. We're praying for an end to the Depression, too."

== Merchandising ==
In addition to T-shirts, Bart has been featured in a variety of The Simpsons-related merchandise which includes dolls, napkins, air fresheners, cups, chewing gum, beach towels, sleeping bags, snow boots, rubber sponge balls, license-plate frames, scratch paper, laminated magnets, and handheld pinball games. Two books have been published about the character: Bart Simpson's Guide to Life (1993) and The Bart Book (2004), both primarily by Groening. The Simpsons and Philosophy: The D'oh! of Homer (2001) contains a chapter analyzing Bart's character and comparing him to the "Nietzschean ideal". Bart has appeared in media related to The Simpsons. He is featured in most of The Simpsons video games, such as Bart vs. the World (1991), Bart Simpson's Escape from Camp Deadly (1991), Bart vs. the Space Mutants (1991), Bart's House of Weirdness (1992), and The Simpsons Game (2007). (Note: See the List of The Simpsons video games.) Bart was a recurring character in the Bongo Comics-distributed Simpsons Comics, which debuted in November 1993 and were published until October 2018. He headlined his eponymous comic-book series, which was distributed by Bongo Comics from 2000 to 2016. Bart plays a role in The Simpsons Ride, a motion-simulator ride launched in 2008 at Universal Studios Florida and Universal Studios Hollywood. On December 9, 2024, Monday Night Football hosted an animated Simpsons version of the Cincinnati Bengals-Dallas Cowboys game which paralleled the events on the field.

Bart and other Simpsons characters appeared in television commercials for Nestlé's Butterfinger candy bars from 1988 to 2001, using the slogan "Nobody better lay a finger on my Butterfinger!". Groening later noted that the success of the Butterfinger commercials played a significant role in Fox's decision to greenlight the half-hour series. Bart has also appeared in commercials for the fast-food Burger King chain. In 2001, Kellogg's introduced the limited-edition Bart Simpson Peanut Butter Chocolate Crunch cereal. Groening pitched Bart as a spokesperson for Jell-O before the launch of the half-hour series, suggesting a commercial in which Bart would sing "J-E-L-L-O" and burp the letter "O". He believed that kids would try to mimic it, but the idea was rejected. On April 9, 2009, the United States Postal Service introduced a series of five 44-cent stamps commemorating Bart and the other members of the Simpson family. The stamps were the first since Sesame Street which were issued while their show was still in production. Designed by Groening, they became available for purchase on May 7, 2009.

== Bibliography ==
- Alberti, John (2004). Leaving Springfield. Wayne State University Press. ISBN 978-0-8143-2849-1.
- Anderson, Terry H. (2024). Why the Nineties Matter. Oxford University Press. ISBN 978-0-19-776301-8.
- Brown, Alan S.; Logan, Chris (2009). The Psychology of the Simpsons. BenBella Books. ISBN 978-1-935251-39-2.
- Browne, Ray Broadus; Browne, Pat (2001). The Guide to United States Popular Culture. Bowling Green State University Popular Press. ISBN 978-0-87972-821-2.
- Browning, John Edgar; Picart, Caroline Joan "Kay" (2014). Dracula in Visual Media. McFarland & Company. ISBN 978-0-7864-6201-8.
- Cantor, P. (December 1999). "The Simpsons: Atomistic Politics and the Nuclear Family". Political Theory. 27 (6): 734–749. doi:10.1177/0090591799027006002. ISSN 0090-5917. JSTOR 192244. S2CID 143998133.
- Cartwright, Nancy (2000). My Life as a 10-Year-Old Boy. Hyperion Books. ISBN 978-0-7868-8600-5.
- Davis, Amy M.; Gilboy, Jemma; Zborowski, James (2015). "How Time Works in The Simpsons". Animation. 10 (3). Sage Publications: 175–188. doi:10.1177/1746847715602403. ISSN 1746-8477.
- Evans, Noell K. Wolfgram (February 10, 2017). Animators of Film and Television. Jefferson, N.C: McFarland & Company. ISBN 978-0-7864-8603-8.
- Ezell, Silas Kaine (2016). Humor and Satire on Contemporary Television. Taylor & Francis. ISBN 978-1-317-11941-8.
- Fink, Moritz (2019). The Simpsons: A Cultural History. Rowman & Littlefield. ISBN 978-1-5381-1617-3.
- Feltmate, David (2017). Drawn to the Gods. New York University Press. ISBN 978-1-4798-9036-1.
- Friedrich, Daniel; Colmenares, Erica (2017). Resonances of El Chavo del Ocho in Latin American Childhood, Schooling, and Societies. Bloomsbury Publishing. ISBN 978-1-4742-9888-9.
- Gitlin, Martin (2013). The Greatest Sitcoms of All Time. Scarecrow Press. ISBN 978-0-8108-8725-1.
- Groening, Matt (1996). Bart Simpson's Guide to Life. HarperCollins. ISBN 978-0-00-638874-6.
- Groening, Matt (2004). The Bart Book. HarperCollins. ISBN 978-0007191697.
- Groening, Matt (1997). Richmond, Ray; Coffman, Antonia (eds.). The Simpsons: A Complete Guide to Our Favorite Family (1st ed.). HarperPerennial. ISBN 978-0-06-095252-5. LCCN 98141857. OCLC 37796735. OL 433519M.
- Groening, Matt (2001b). Simpsons Comics Royale. New York: HarperPerennial. ISBN 0-06-093378-X.
- Jackson, Ronald L.; Moshin, Jamie E. (2013). Communicating Marginalized Masculinities. Routledge. ISBN 978-0-415-62307-0.
- Lee, Judith Yaross (2012). Twain's Brand. University Press of Mississippi. ISBN 978-1-61703-643-9.
- Meskill, Carla (2007). "Through the Screen, into the School: Education, subversion, ourselves in The Simpsons". Discourse: Studies in the Cultural Politics of Education. 28 (1): 37–48. doi:10.1080/01596300601073119. ISSN 0159-6306.
- Ott, B. L. (2003). "'I'm Bart Simpson, Who the Hell Are You?' A Study in Postmodern Identity (Re)Construction". The Journal of Popular Culture. 37 (37): 56–82. doi:10.1111/1540-5931.00054. hdl:10217/60074. ProQuest 195365310.
- Neuman, Yair; Danesi, Marcel; Vilenchik, Dan (2022). Using AI for Dialoguing with Texts: From Psychology to Cinema and Literature. Taylor & Francis. ISBN 978-1-0008-0678-6.
- Perlmutter, David (2018). The Encyclopedia of American Animated Television Shows. Rowman & Littlefield. ISBN 978-1-5381-0374-6.
- Pinsky, Mark (2007). The Gospel According to the Simpsons. Presbyterian Publishing Corporation. ISBN 978-0-664-23160-6.
- Reiss, Mike; Klickstein, Mathew (2018). Springfield Confidential. Dey Street Books. ISBN 978-0-06-274803-4.
- Sanders, Theresa (2009). Approaching Eden. Rowman & Littlefield. ISBN 978-0-7425-6333-9.
- Scullion, Chris (2019). The NES Encyclopedia. Pen & Sword Books. ISBN 978-1-5267-3782-3.
- Scullion, Chris (2024). The Game Boy Encyclopedia. Pen & Sword Books. ISBN 978-1-3990-9680-5.
- Sehlinger, Bob (2009) [1999]. Beyond Disney: The Unofficial Guide to Universal Orlando. Wiley. ISBN 978-0-4704-6031-3.
- Sito, Tom (2006). Drawing the Line: The Untold Story of the Animation Unions from Bosko to Bart Simpson. University Press of Kentucky. ISBN 978-1-0008-0678-6.
- Stabile, Carol A.; Harrison, Mark (2003). Prime Time Animation. Routledge. ISBN 978-0-415-28326-7.
- Terrace, Vincent (2017). Television Series of the 1980s. Rowman & Littlefield. ISBN 978-1-4422-7831-8.
- Turner, Chris (2004). Planet Simpson: How a Cartoon Masterpiece Documented an Era and Defined a Generation. Foreword by Douglas Coupland (1st ed.). Toronto: Random House Canada. ISBN 978-0-679-31318-2. OCLC 55682258.
- Waltonen, Karma; Du Vernay, Denise (2019). The Simpsons' Beloved Springfield. McFarland & Company. ISBN 978-1-4766-7455-1.
- Waltonen, Karma; Du Vernay, Denise (2014). The Simpsons in the Classroom: Embiggening the Learning Experience with the Wisdom of Springfield. McFarland & Company. ISBN 978-0-7864-5692-5.
