= Dan Castellaneta filmography =

Filmography of American actor

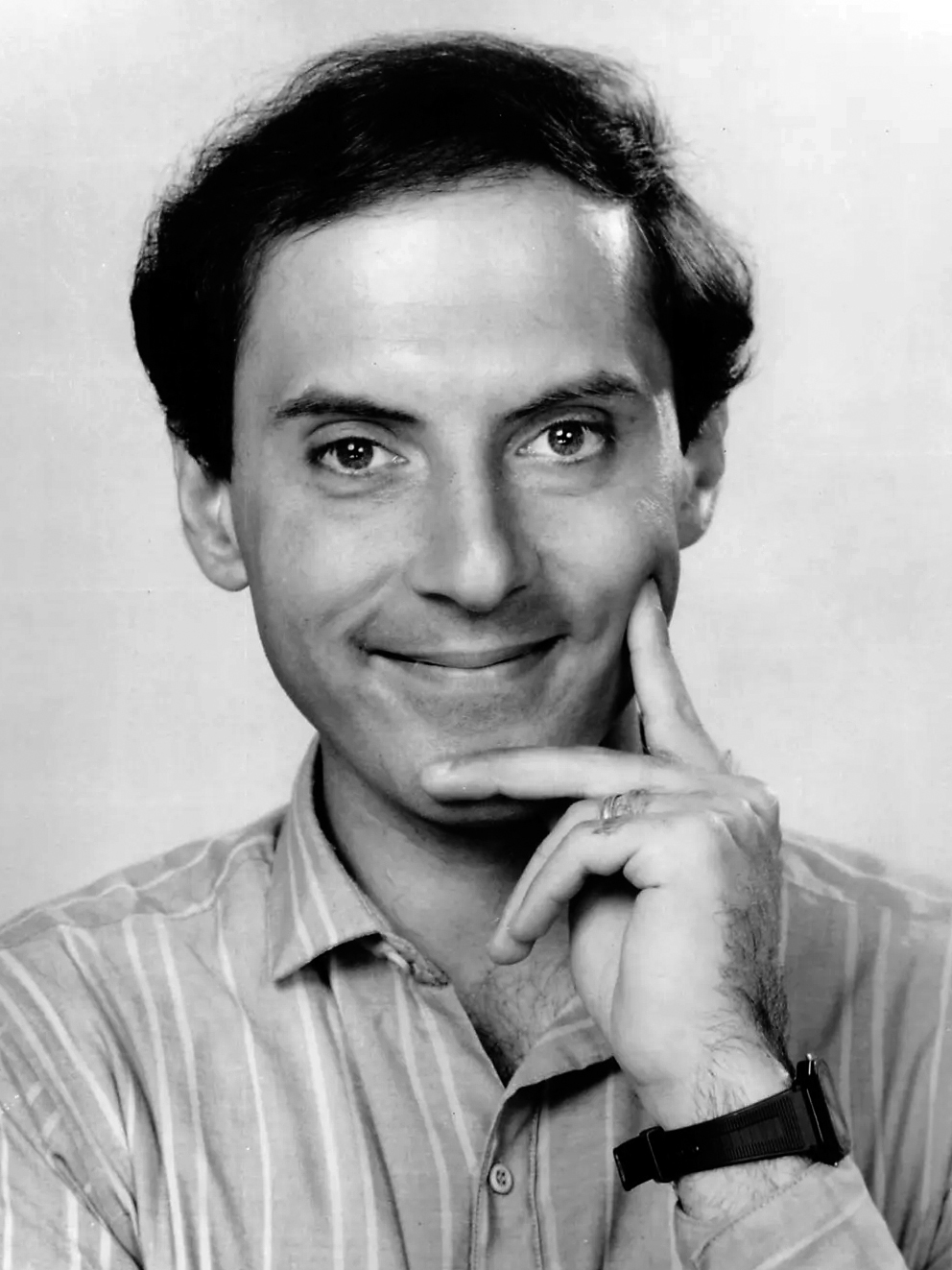
- Castellaneta in 1988
- Film: 50
- Television series: 102
- Music videos: 4
- Theatre: 1
- Others: Video games (29), theme park (4)

The following is a complete filmography of the actor Dan Castellaneta. Active since the 1980s, Castellaneta has appeared in numerous films, television series and video games. Along with his live-action work, he has often worked as a voice actor, including for his longest-running role as Homer Simpson in the animated sitcom The Simpsons. Castellaneta has also written six episodes of the show with his wife Deb Lacusta, and has won three Primetime Emmy Awards Outstanding Voice-Over Performance for it.

== Live-action filmography ==
=== Film ===
Year	Film	Role	Notes
1986	Nothing in Common	Brian	
1989	Say Anything...	Diane's teacher	Uncredited
1989	K-9	Maitre D'	
1989	The War of the Roses	Gavin's client	
1994	The Client	Slick Moeller	
1994	Love Affair	Phil	
1995	Forget Paris	Man test-driving car	Uncredited
1996	Space Jam	Male fan	
1997	Plump Fiction	Bumpkin	
1998	My Giant	Partlow	
1999	The Settlement	Neal	
2002	Harold Buttleman, Daredevil Stuntman	Human Cannonball	
2004	Adventures in Homeschooling	Gus Hemple	Short film
2006	I-See-You.Com	Jim Orr	
2006	I Want Someone to Eat Cheese With	Dick	
2006	The Pursuit of Happyness	Alan Frakesh	
2007	Hellboy Animated: Iron Shoes	Iron Shoes	Short film on DVD of Hellboy: Blood and Iron
2007	Chasing Robert	Dan the Bookie	
2008	Superhero Movie	Carlson	
2008	Remembering Phil	Dr. Seymour	
2011	Super 8	Izzy	
2011	Scratching the Surface	Mr. Edelman	
2015	Fantastic Four	Mr. Kenny	

=== Television ===
Year	Title	Role	Notes
1987–1990	The Tracey Ullman Show	Various characters	Recurring role
1990	ALF	Steve Michaels	Episode: "Stayin' Alive"
1990	Bagdad Café	Gilbert	Episode: "Rainy Days and Mondays"
1990	Working Tra$h	George Agrande	Television film
1990, 1992	Married... with Children	Pete, Funeral Director	2 episodes
1991	Dream On	Phil	Episode: "The 37-Year Itch"
1991	Sibs	Warren Morris	Recurring role
1992	Lady Against the Odds	Len Chisholm	Television film
1992	L.A. Law	David Champion	Episode: "L.A. Lawless"
1993	Tracey Ullman Takes on New York	Gordon	Television special
1994	Wings	George Wexler	Episode: "Moonlighting"
1994	The George Carlin Show	Passenger	Episode: "George Gets Some Money"
1994	Related by Birth	Warren Morris	Television film
1994	Bakersfield P.D.	Darian Ferguson	Episode: "Last One Into the Water"
1994	Grace Under Fire	Mr. Rudder	Episode: "Jimmy's Girl"
1995	Murphy Brown	Tony Lucchesi	Episode: "Specific Overtures"
1995	The Computer Wore Tennis Shoes	Alan Winsdale	Television film
1996	Friends	The Zoo Keeper	Episode: "The One After the Super Bowl: Part 1"
1996	NYPD Blue	Gus	Episode: "Head Case"
1997	Cybill	DaVolio	Episode: "Kiss Me, You Fool"
1997	The Drew Carey Show	Stan	Episode: "Two Drews and the Queen of Poland"
1998	Rhapsody in Bloom	Chelton	Television film
1998–2001	Everybody Loves Raymond	Bryan	2 episodes
1999	Mad About You	Rory O'Grady	Episode: "Win a Free Car"
1999	Oh, Grow Up	Sven Jorgensen	Episode: "Hunter's Metamorphosis"
1999	Nash Bridges	Eddie Day	Episode: "Crosstalk"
2001	Yes, Dear	Walt	Episode: "Where There's a Will, There's a Waiver"
2001	Laughter on the 23rd Floor	Milt Fields	Television film
2002–2003	Reba	Eugene Fisher	2 episodes
2003	The Pitts	Morty	Episode: "Dummy and Dummier"
2003	Frasier	Brad	Episode: "Maris Returns"
2003	That '70s Show	Agent Armstrong	Episode: "I'm Free"
2004	Behind the Camera: The Unauthorized Story of Charlie's Angels	Aaron Spelling	Television film
2004	Complete Savages	Frog, Mr. Horner	Episode: "Free Lily"
2005	Stargate SG-1	Joe Spencer	Episode: "Citizen Joe"
2005	Arrested Development	Dr. Stein	Episode: "Sword of Destiny"
2006	The Jeff Garlin Program	Ted	Television film
2006	Veronica Mars	Dr. Kinny	Episode: "My Big Fat Greek Rush Week"
2006–2007	Campus Ladies	Dean Dewey	2 episodes
2007	Sands of Oblivion	Cecil B. DeMille	Television film
2007	Entourage	Andrew Preston	2 episodes
2007–2011	Greek	Dr. Milton Hastings	9 episodes
2008	Monk	Tiny Werner	Episode: "Mr. Monk Goes to the Bank"
2008	Reno 911!	Commissioner Jerry Salerno	Episode: "Junior Runs for Office"
2008	Relative Stranger	Gary	Television film
2009	Castle	Judge Markway	2 episodes
2009	Ghost Whisperer	Frank the Ghost	Episode: "This Joint's Haunted"
2009	How I Met Your Mother	Milt	Episode: "Right Place, Right Time"
2009	Bones	Officer Novarro	Episode: "The Dwarf in the Dirt"
2009	Desperate Housewives	Jeff Bicks	Episode: "Boom Crunch"
2010	Tracey Ullman's State of the Union	Agent	Episode #3.5
2010	The Good Guys	Walter Diparko	Episode: "Hunches & Heists"
2010	The Simpsons 20th Anniversary Special – In 3-D! On Ice!	Himself	Television special
2011	Parks and Recreation	Derry Murbles	3 episodes
2012	The Office	CEO of Prestige Direct Sale Solutions	Episode: "Turf War"
2013	Major Crimes	Ray Winters	Episode: "Year-End Blowout"
2013	Dads	British Narrator	Episode: "Pilot"
2013	The Mindy Project	Marty	Episode: "Danny's Friend"
2013	Wendell & Vinnie	Mr. Lipshitz	Minor role
2014	The League	Dr. Harvat	Episode: "Taco Standard Time"
2014	Quick Draw	Deacon Jim	Episode: "Deacon Jim"
2014	Hot in Cleveland	Dr. McNally	Episode: "Straight Outta Cleveland"
2015	The Unauthorized Beverly Hills, 90210 Story	Aaron Spelling	Television film
2015	The Unauthorized Melrose Place Story	Aaron Spelling	Television film
2015	Baby Daddy	Peter Oliver	Episode: "What Happens in Vegas"
2019	Merry Happy Whatever	Ted Boseman	2 episodes
2022	9-1-1: Lone Star	Patrick Sr.	Episode #3.13

== Voice-over filmography ==
=== Film ===
Year	Title	Role	Notes
1991	Don't Tell Mom the Babysitter's Dead	Animated babysitter	
1993	Super Mario Bros.	Narrator	Credited as Dan Castellenetta
1994	The Return of Jafar	Genie, Thief, Omar	
1996	All Dogs Go to Heaven 2	Tall Customs Dog, Angel Dog #1	
1996	The Hunchback of Notre Dame	Frollo's Soldiers	
2000	Joseph: King of Dreams	Auctioneer, Horse Trader	Direct-to-video
2000	Rugrats in Paris: The Movie	Priest	
2001	Recess: School's Out	Guard #1	
2002	Return to Never Land	Additional voices	
2002	Hey Arnold!: The Movie	Grandpa Phil Shortman, Nick Vermicelli	
2003	Kim Possible: The Secret Files	Drakken's Goons	Direct-to-video
2003	The Cat in the Hat	Thing One and Thing Two	
2003	Recess: Taking the Fifth Grade	Boe Agent #2	Direct-to-video
2005	Jasmine's Enchanted Tales: Journey of a Princess	Genie	Direct-to-video
2006	The Emperor's Secret	Seppo Kääriäinen	English dub
2006	Tom and Jerry: Shiver Me Whiskers	Additional voices	
2006	Scooby-Doo! Pirates Ahoy!	Mr. Mysterio, Woodenleg Wally	Direct-to-video
2007	The Simpsons Movie	Homer Simpson, Abe Simpson, Krusty the Clown, various characters	
2008	Futurama: The Beast with a Billion Backs	Robot Devil	Direct-to-video
2008	Immigrants	Mr. Csapo	English dub
2008	Horton Hears a Who!	The Wickersham Brothers	
2021	The Good, the Bart, and the Loki	Homer Simpson, Barney Gumble	Short film
2021	Plusaversary	Homer Simpson, Donald Duck, Barney Gumble, Sideshow Mel, Happy, Grumpy, Winnie the Pooh	Short film
2022	The Simpsons Meet the Bocellis in 'Feliz Navidad'	Homer Simpson, Santa's Little Helper	Short film
2024	May the 12th Be with You	Homer Simpson, Abe Simpson, Goofy	Short film
2026	The Poe Family	Travis Carter	
2027	The New Simpsons Movie †	Homer Simpson	

=== Television ===
Year	Title	Role	Notes
1989–present	The Simpsons	Homer Simpson, Abe Simpson, Krusty the Clown, various characters	Main role; writer for 8 episodes, consulting producer, co-executive producer
1990	TaleSpin	Dr. Zibaldo	Episode: "The Incredible Shrinking Molly"
1990	42nd Primetime Emmy Awards	Homer Simpson	Television special
1991–1995	Taz-Mania	Mister Thickley	Recurring role
1991–2001	Sesame Street	Homer Simpson	7 episodes
1991–1992	Darkwing Duck	Megavolt/Elmo Sputterspark	19 episodes
1991–1992	Back to the Future	Dr. Emmett Brown	26 episodes
1992	Fievel's American Tails	Chula the Tarantula, Mr. Schimmel, Slim, Felonious	9 episodes
1992	Dinosaurs	Zabar	Episode: "Germ Warfare"
1992	Tiny Toon Adventures	Jeffries, Harvey, Additional voices	2 episodes
1992	Goof Troop	Earl	Episode: "To Catch A Goof"; uncredited
1992–1997	Eek! The Cat	Mittens, Bill, Hank	11 episodes
1993	Animaniacs	Dracula	Episode: "Draculee, Draculaa"
1993	The Pink Panther	Voodoo Man, Additional voices	Recurring role
1993	Sonic the Hedgehog	Lazaar	Episode: "Super Sonic"; uncredited
1993	Marsupilami	Stewart	2 episodes
1994	The Critic	Homer Simpson	Episode: "Dial 'M' for Mother"
1994	The Tick	Mole King	Episode: "The Tick vs. the Mole-Men"
1994–1995	Aladdin	Genie, various characters	Main role
1994–2003	Rugrats	Jonathan, Hershowitz, Jury Foreman, Press, Train Conductor, Head Detective	6 episodes
1995–1996	Earthworm Jim	Earthworm Jim, Evil Jim	Main role
1995–1997	The Mask: Animated Series	Chet Bozzack	Episode: "Split Personality"
1996	Quack Pack	Gil	Episode: "Koi Story"
1996–1998	The Spooktacular New Adventures of Casper	Additional voices	52 episodes
1996–2004	Hey Arnold!	Grandpa Phil Shortman, various characters	Main role
1997	101 Dalmatians: The Series	Go-Go	Episode: "Tic Track Toe"
1997	Nightmare Ned	Number 1	Episode: "Alien Abduction"
1997	The Online Adventures of Ozzie the Elf	Comet, Blitzen	Television film
1997–1999	Cow and Chicken	Earl, various characters	Recurring role
1997–1999	Johnny Bravo	Carl the Carnie, Old man, Harvey	2 episodes
1997–1999	I Am Weasel	Additional voices	4 episodes
1998	Hercules	Homer the reporter	2 episodes
1998–2001	Histeria!	Additional voices	Recurring role
1999	The New Woody Woodpecker Show	Additional voices	Episode: "Ya Gonna Eat That?/Chilly & Hungry/Brother Cockroach"
1999	Detention	Additional voices	Recurring role
1999	Olive, the Other Reindeer	The Postman	Television special
1999–present	Futurama	Robot Devil	7 episodes
2000	Buzz Lightyear of Star Command	Various characters	8 episodes
2000–2001	Batman Beyond	Mr. Groote, Guard, Kobra Commando	3 episodes
2001–2004	Lloyd in Space	Dunkirque, Mr. Blobberts, Driver, Rodeo Clown Lloyd, additional voices	10 episodes
2002	Jackie Chan Adventures	Jumba	Episode: "Into the Mouth of Evil"
2002	Kim Possible	Various characters	3 episodes
2003	All Grown Up!	Jonathan	Episode: "Lost At Sea"
2003	The Adventures of Jimmy Neutron, Boy Genius	Professor Crank, Hulk Jimmy	2 episodes
2003	Justice League	Minister	Episode: "Maid of Honor"
2003	Duck Dodgers	Martian sage, Football player #3, Various characters	Episode: "Quarterback Quack/To Love a Duck"
2004	Party Wagon	Wild Bill Hickok, Clerk, Cheyenne #2	Television film
2004	As Told by Ginger	Dave Bishop, Jeweler	Episode: "About Face"
2004–2008	The Batman	Arnold Wesker/Ventriloquist, Scarface, Mr. Snoots	3 episodes
2005	What's New, Scooby-Doo?	Officer McBride	Episode: "A Scooby-Doo Valentine"
2005	My Life as a Teenage Robot	Drones, Teacher	Episode: "Killgore"
2006	Casper's Scare School	Stretch	Television film
2006	Legion of Super Heroes	Boris, Captain Howdy, Coluans	Episode: "Fear Factory"
2010	The Simpsons 20th Anniversary Special – In 3-D! On Ice!	Homer Simpson	Television special
2010, 2012, 2015	Late Show with David Letterman	Homer Simpson	3 episodes
2012	FOX 25th Anniversary Special	Homer Simpson	Television special
2012, 2014, 2020	Family Guy	Homer Simpson	4 episodes
2014	Last Week Tonight with John Oliver	Homer Simpson	Episode: "The Lottery"
2017	Hey Arnold!: The Jungle Movie	Grandpa Phil Shortman	Television film
2019	Brockmire	Duke Yipovski	Episode: "The Yips"

=== Video games ===
Year	Title	Voice role	Notes
1991	The Simpsons	Homer Simpson	
1992	The Simpsons: Bart's Nightmare	Homer Simpson	
1996	The Simpsons: Cartoon Studio	Homer Simpson, Krusty the Klown, additional voices	
1996	Toonstruck	Flux Wildly	
1997	Virtual Springfield	Homer Simpson, Abe Simpson, Krusty the Clown, additional voices	
1998	Driver	Answering machine callers	
1999	Planescape: Torment	Nordom	
1999	Y2K: The Game	Additional voices	
1999	Earthworm Jim 3D	Earthworm Jim	
1999	The Simpsons Bowling	Homer Simpson, Abe Simpson, Barney Gumble, additional voices	
2001	Aladdin in Nasira's Revenge	Genie, Potion Mancom	
2001	The Simpsons Wrestling	Homer Simpson, Barney Gumble, Krusty the Clown, additional voices	
2001	The Simpsons: Road Rage	Homer Simpson, Abe Simpson, additional voices	
2002	Kingdom Hearts	Genie	
2002	The Simpsons Skateboarding	Homer Simpson, Krusty the Clown, additional voices	
2003	The Simpsons: Hit & Run	Homer Simpson, Abe Simpson, Barney Gumble, Krusty the Clown, additional voices	
2003	Metal Arms: Glitch in the System	Krunk	
2005	Kingdom Hearts II	Genie	
2006	Cartoon Network Racing	Earl	
2006	Happy Feet	Ramon, Elephant Seal #1	
2007	The Simpsons Game	Homer Simpson, Itchy, Barney Gumble, Abe Simpson, Krusty the Clown, additional voices	
2007	Kingdom Hearts Re:Chain of Memories	Genie	Archival audio
2012	The Simpsons: Tapped Out	Homer Simpson, Abe Simpson, Barney Gumble, Krusty the Clown, additional voices	
2013	Kingdom Hearts HD 1.5 Remix	Genie	Archival audio
2014	Kingdom Hearts HD 2.5 Remix	Genie	Archival audio
2015	Lego Dimensions	Homer Simpson, Krusty the Clown, Abe Simpson, Groundskeeper Willie, Hans Moleman, Mayor Quimby	Archival audio
2025	Fortnite Battle Royale	Homer Simpson, Krusty the Clown, Kodos, Hans Moleman, Mayor Quimby	
2026	Monopoly Go!	Homer Simpson	

=== Music videos ===
Year	Song	Role	Artist
1990	"Do the Bartman"	Homer Simpson, Krusty the Clown	Nancy Cartwright
1991	"Deep, Deep Trouble"	Homer Simpson, Krusty the Clown	Himself, Nancy Cartwright
1991	"Black or White"	Homer Simpson	Michael Jackson
2002	"I Am Not Homer"	Various voices	Himself

=== Theme parks ===
Year	Title	Role
1999–2010	SpectroMagic	Genie
2003–2017	Wishes: A Magical Gathering of Disney Dreams	Genie
2008–present	The Simpsons Ride	Homer Simpson, Various characters
2013–present	Kang & Kodos' Twirl 'n' Hurl	Kodos

== Theater ==
Year	Title	Role
1990	American Splendor	Mark Peekos
