= Die Hard (disambiguation) =

Die Hard is a 1988 American action film.

Die Hard may also refer to:

== Media ==
=== Films ===
- Die Hard (franchise), a series of action movies
  - Die Hard 2 (1990)
  - Die Hard with a Vengeance (1995)
  - Live Free or Die Hard (2007), also known as Die Hard 4.0
  - A Good Day to Die Hard (2013)

=== Video games ===
- Die Hard video games, based on the films:
  - Die Hard (video game) (1990), a game for the Nintendo Entertainment System, Commodore 64, TurboGrafx-16, and DOS
  - Die Hard 2: Die Harder (1992), for the Amiga, Atari ST, Commodore 64, and MS-DOS
  - Die Hard Arcade (1996), for arcade and Sega Saturn
  - Die Hard Trilogy (1996) for PC, Sony PlayStation, and Saturn
  - Die Hard Trilogy 2: Viva Las Vegas (2000) for PC and PlayStation
  - Die Hard: Nakatomi Plaza (2002) for PC
  - Die Hard: Vendetta (2002) for Nintendo GameCube, Microsoft Xbox, and Sony PlayStation 2

== Music ==
- Die Hards, a 2001 album by The Casualties
- "Die Hard" (song), by Kendrick Lamar, 2022
- "Die Hard", an unreleased song by Dr. Dre
- "Die Hard", a 1983 song by Venom

== Others ==
- Die hard (phrase), one not easily swayed from a belief
- DieHard (brand), a line of batteries marketed by Advance Auto Parts
- Diehard tests, a battery of statistical tests for random number generators
- Diehard, a pattern in the Game of Life
- Die-Hards, the nickname of the Middlesex Regiment of the British Army
- Talladega DieHard 500, a former NASCAR race
