= Pamela Hayden =

American voice actress (born 1953)

- Born: 1953 or 1954 (age 71–72)
- Occupation: Voice actress
- Years active: 1978–2025

Pamela Hayden (born 1953/1954) is an American retired voice actress, known for providing various voices for the animated television show The Simpsons, such as Milhouse Van Houten, Rod Flanders, and Jimbo Jones.

== Biography ==
Hayden provided voices for characters in The Simpsons including Bart Simpson's best friend Milhouse Van Houten, teenage thug Jimbo Jones, Ned Flanders' son Rod, Chief Wiggum’s wife and Ralph Wiggum's mother Sarah, and Lisa Simpson's friend Janey Powell. She also originally voiced the character of Katrina (Shanks) Meltsner and Doris Rathbone, on the Focus on the Family radio drama Adventures in Odyssey from 1993 to 2000. She also provided the voices of Bianca from Spyro: Year of the Dragon, Douglas McNoggin on Lloyd in Space and Sublimity Jill in Party Wagon.

In November 2024, Hayden announced her retirement from the voice-acting industry. However, Simpsons creator Matt Groening and writer Carolyn Omine later revealed that Hayden would make a few more performances than initially announced.

== Filmography ==
=== Films ===
Year	Title	Role
1999	Being John Malkovich	Additional voices
2007	The Simpsons Movie	Milhouse Van Houten, Rod Flanders

=== Television ===
Year	Title	Role	Notes
1978	More Than Friends	Sky	TV film
1979	Studs Lonigan	Unknown	TV mini-series
1982	Hill Street Blues	Mrs. Jackson	Appeared in three episodes
1982	The Price Is Right	Contestant on the September 13, 1982 episode	
1984	Turbo Teen	Pattie	Main cast member
1984	Snorks	Additional voices	
1987	The Transformers	Jessica Morgan	2 episodes
1988	Designing Women	Waitress	Episode: "Ted-Bare"
1988	Wheel of Fortune	Contestant on the December 1, 1988 syndicated episode	
1989–2025	The Simpsons	Milhouse Van Houten, Jimbo Jones, Rod Flanders, Janey Powell, Sarah Wiggum, Additional voices	695+ episodes
1990	The Tom & Jerry Kids Show	Additional voices	
1993	Bonkers	Rita	Episode: "Love Stuck"
1993	Droopy, Master Detective	Additional voices	
1994	Aaahh!!! Real Monsters	Teen, Tough Girl	Episode: "Get Down Here!"
1995	The Nanny	Chester the Dog	Episode: "Oy to the World"
1996–1999	Hey Arnold!	Connie	2 episodes
1997	Tokyo Pig	Spencer Weinberg-Takahama	Unaired test dub
1997–1998	Pinky and the Brain	Trudy, Dawn	2 episodes
1998	The New Batman Adventures	Geena	Episode: "Old Wounds"
1999–2000	Recess	Steve, Lance the Pants	2 episodes
2001–2004	Lloyd in Space	Douglas McNoggin	Main cast
2004	Party Wagon	Sublimity Jill, Daughter	Television film

=== Music videos ===
Year	Title	Role	Artist
1990	"Do the Bartman"	Milhouse Van Houten	Nancy Cartwright

=== Radio ===
Year	Title	Role	Notes
1992–2000	Adventures in Odyssey	Katrina Shanks, Doris Rathbone	49 episodes

=== Video games ===
Year	Title	Role	Notes
1996	The Simpsons: Cartoon Studio	Milhouse Van Houten, Jimbo Jones	
1997	The Simpsons: Virtual Springfield	Milhouse Van Houten, Rod Flanders	
2000	Spyro: Year of the Dragon	Bianca	
2001	The Simpsons: Road Rage	Milhouse Van Houten	
2002	Spyro: Enter the Dragonfly	Bianca	
2003	The Simpsons: Hit & Run	Milhouse Van Houten, Jimbo Jones, Rod Flanders	
2007	The Simpsons Game	Milhouse Van Houten, Jimbo Jones, Rod Flanders, Janey Powell, Sarah Wiggum, Wendell Borton	

=== Theme park ===
- The Simpsons Ride (2008) – Milhouse Van Houten
