= Fox Interactive =

Defunct American video game publisher

- Final logo used from 2002 to 2006
- Type: Division (1994–2003); Label (2003–2006)
- Industry: Video games
- Founded: May 1994; 32 years ago
- Founder: Ted Hoff
- Defunct: 2006; 20 years ago
- Fate: Acquired by and folded into Vivendi Universal Games
- Headquarters: Los Angeles, California, U.S.
- Products: The Simpsons series; Croc series; No One Lives Forever series; Fox Sports series; Die Hard series; Aliens Versus Predator series
- Brands: Fox Toons Interactive; Fox Sports Interactive; Fox Arcade; Fox Kids Interactive
- Parent: News Corporation (1994–2003); Vivendi Universal Games (2003–2006)

Fox Interactive was an American video game publisher based in Los Angeles, California that was active from May 1994 to 2006, when it was acquired by and folded into Vivendi Universal Games. The company published games based on 20th Century Fox properties such as The Simpsons and Die Hard, yet also published several original titles, such as Croc: Legend of the Gobbos and The Operative: No One Lives Forever.

== History ==
=== News Corporation (1994–2003) ===
Fox Interactive logo used from 1994 to 2003.

Fox Interactive was formed in May 1994, and was led by former Time Warner Interactive executive Ted Hoff. The first two games published by the new division were The Tick, based on the Fox Kids cartoon series of the same name, and The Pagemaster, based on the film of the same name.

On January 5, 1996, the company announced the release of Die Hard Trilogy for an August–September 1996 release window. On March 21, 1996, Fox Interactive signed a deal with Electronic Arts (EA) for distribution of their titles outside North America. The company would attend their first Electronic Entertainment Expo in 1996, and announced six mainstream titles during the event: The Simpsons Cartoon Studio, The Simpsons: Virtual Springfield and The X-Files for Windows and Macintosh, Aliens Versus Predator and Independence Day for PlayStation, Sega Saturn and Windows, and The Tick for PlayStation and Sega Saturn, alongside the already announced Die Hard Trilogy. The company also announced the launch of the Fox Toons Interactive label, consisting of educational games for Windows and Macintosh based on licensed properties, with the first five titles: Baby Felix, Hello Kitty Big Fun, Eekstravaganza, The Tick and Keroppi being released within a Fall release window. In November 1996, the company announced the release of a CD-ROM based on Romeo + Juliet for December.

In February 1997, the company announced a video game based on Alien Resurrection for the PlayStation, Sega Saturn and PC, and two CD-ROM tie-in titles - The X-Files: Data Files, and Anastasia, based on the 1997 movie. In the same month, the company announced major marketing plans for Independence Day before the game's release on March 11 in the United States, including a multi-million dollar ad campaign. In April, the Fox Toons Interactive division announced the release of four more titles: Baby Felix Creativity Center, Hello Kitty Creativity Center, Danny and the Dinosaur and Frog and Toad are Friends, the latter two based on children's books. In May, Fox Interactive announced the acquisition of the publishing rights to Argonaut Software's Croc: Legend of the Gobbos, and announced to showcase it at E3 1997. During E3 in June, in addition to the previously announced titles, the Aliens Versus Predator title was announced for an Early 1998 release. The only newly announced title at E3 that year for the publisher was Aliens Online, developed by then-fellow News Corporation subsidiary Kesmai. On December 15, 1997, Fox Interactive formed a joint-venture with News Corporation's Fox Sports division and formed Fox Sports Interactive, which would be used to publish sports titles for consoles and computers. The company signed a long-term North American development agreement with Gremlin Interactive to re-name and publish some of the latter's Actua Sports titles for the North American market.

On April 15, 1998, the company announced to publish Gremlin's N20: Nitrous Oxide for the US market for a June 1998 release. The first two republished Actua Sports titles were also announced for the same release window - Fox Sports Soccer '99 and Fox Sports Golf '99. During E3 1998, the company acquired the rights to two more Gremlin titles - Team Losi: RC Racer and Motorhead, as well as also announcing Croc 2 for PlayStation and Windows, and Virtual K'Nex for CD-ROM. Other titles showcased included Aliens Versus Predator and several Fox Sports titles. In August, the company announced the CD-ROM title James Cameron's Titanic Explorer, based on the film of the same name. In November 1998, the company delayed the releases of Alien Resurrection and Croc 2 to Mid-1999.

In May 1999, during E3, the company announced Activision as the exclusive worldwide distributor of Fox Sports Interactive titles in Europe, Asia and Africa, excluding Japan. Fox would continue to distribute and publish the titles in North America and Japan, and would not affect EA's existing worldwide distribution deal with Fox's non-Sports titles. During the event, the company announced Die Hard Trilogy 2 and a video game based on Planet of the Apes., in addition to Croc 2 and Fox Sports Interactive title Fox Sports Pro Baseball 2000 . In July, a Game Boy Color version of Croc was announced for a Winter 1999 release window. In August 1999, the company was announced to be publishing two titles from Monolith Productions: Sanity: Aiken's Artifact, and The Operative: No One Lives Forever. On the same day, the company announced plans to release games for the PlayStation 2. In September 1999, the company announced to support the Dreamcast, announcing versions of Croc 2 and Planet of the Apes for the system, and a game based on World's Scariest Police Chases tentatively titled World's Scariest Police Chases: Deadly Pursuit.

On March 16, 2000, it was announced that THQ would publish the Game Boy Color version of Croc under license from Fox. In April, the company's Dreamcast games would be released at the end of 2000. and within the same month announced a full worldwide publishing deal with THQ for the company's Game Boy Color titles, with the additions of games based on The Simpsons, Buffy the Vampire Slayer, Aliens and Croc 2 in addition to the already announced Croc title. At E3 2000, in addition to several previously announced titles, the company announced Buffy the Vampire Slayer and World's Scariest Police Chases for the PlayStation, Dreamcast and Windows, and The Simpsons Wrestling and Titan AE for PlayStation. Dreamcast ports of Alien Resurrection and Sanity: Aiken's Artifact were announced, alongside the company's first PlayStation 2 projects, a port of The Operative: No One Lives Forever and Aliens: Colonial Marines. In July 2000, the company announced a sequel to Aliens Versus Predator as part of their deal with Monolith Productions. In August 2000, the company announced that the Dreamcast port of Croc 2 would be cancelled. In the same month, Unique Development Studios signed a deal to co-publish and develop a Futurama title with Fox for a 2002 release. In November 2000, the company announced a King of the Hill game that was released for Windows and Macintosh.

In January 2001, Fox Interactive announced they would start to focus more on development and would begin to co-publish their titles with a selection of well-known companies from then-on. Activision became the first of these publishing partners, acquiring US rights to The Simpsons Wrestling on March 13, and worldwide rights to World's Scariest Police Chases on April 20. The company also announced a reevaluation of their Dreamcast titles following Sega's announcement to discontinue the system., Eventually, the company canceled the Dreamcast versions of Alien Resurrection and World's Scariest Police Chases, and left Planet of the Apes and Buffy the Vampire Slayer in limbo. In April 2001, the company announced their plans for the Xbox, including a game based on Cops titled The Cops: Too Hot for TV, and a racing game based on The Simpsons. The already-announced Buffy the Vampire Slayer title was moved to the system as an exclusive, leaving the existing PlayStation and Dreamcast versions scrapped. During E3 2001, Fox Interactive announced four titles: The Simpsons: Road Rage, Die Hard: Nakatomi Plaza, Die Hard: Vendetta and No One Lives Forever 2: A Spy in H.A.R.M.'s Way, in addition to the previously announced Aliens: Colonial Marines, Buffy the Vampire Slayer, Cops: Too Hot for TV and the PlayStation 2 port of The Operative: No One Lives Forever. During E3 2001 the company announced that EA would publish the Aliens, The Simpsons and Buffy titles, in addition to Vivendi Universal Interactive Publishing publishing the Die Hard, Cops and the No One Lives Forever titles, which was announced a week prior to E3. In August 2001, the company and DreamWorks SKG's consumer products division signed a 5-year publishing deal with Activision for the publication on games based on Minority Report.

At E3 2002, the company showcased three existing titles: No One Lives Forever 2, Die Hard: Vendetta and Buffy the Vampire Slayer, and announced two new titles: The Simpsons Skateboarding and a game based on the Dark Angel television series. In July 2002, the company signed another publishing deal with THQ to include Game Boy Advance titles, with a Buffy the Vampire Slayer title and a port of The Simpsons: Road Rage confirmed to be in development.

=== Vivendi Universal Games (2003–2006) ===
In March 2003, 20th Century Fox sold Fox Interactive to Vivendi Universal Games for an undisclosed amount. After being purchased, the name was reduced to solely being a label for 20th Century Fox games published by Vivendi Universal Games. The label would be phased out by 2006, although Vivendi Universal continued to publish titles based on 20th Century Fox properties, with such examples including Eragon, and Aliens vs. Predator: Requiem. 20th Century Fox would later partner with other publishers to create games based on their properties, something which continues on to this day.

Most of Fox Interactive's game library was copyrighted to 20th Century Fox and therefore is currently owned by The Walt Disney Company. The companies Fox Digital Entertainment and FoxNext did similar things to Fox Interactive.

== Games ==
=== As a publisher/licensor ===
Year	Title	Platform(s)	Developer(s)	Publisher(s)
1994	The Tick	Super NES, Sega Genesis	Software Creations	Fox Interactive
1994	The Pagemaster	Super NES, Sega Genesis, Game Boy	Probe Software	Fox Interactive
1995	Icebreaker	Microsoft Windows	Magnet Interactive Studios	Fox Interactive
1996	Alien Trilogy	PlayStation, Sega Saturn, Microsoft Windows	Probe Entertainment	Acclaim Entertainment
1996	The Simpsons: Cartoon Studio	Microsoft Windows, Mac OS	Big Top Productions	Fox Interactive
1996	Die Hard Trilogy	PlayStation, Microsoft Windows, Sega Saturn	Probe Entertainment	Fox Interactive
1997	Die Hard Arcade	Arcade, Sega Saturn	Sega AM1	Sega
1997	Independence Day	Microsoft Windows, PlayStation, Sega Saturn	Radical Entertainment	Fox Interactive
1997	The Simpsons: Virtual Springfield	Microsoft Windows, Mac OS	Digital Evolution	Fox Interactive
1997	Croc: Legend of the Gobbos	PlayStation, Sega Saturn, Microsoft Windows	Argonaut Software	Fox Interactive
1997	Anastasia: Adventures with Pooka and Bartok	Microsoft Windows, Mac OS	Motion Works	Fox Interactive
1998	Aliens Online	Microsoft Windows	Mythic Entertainment/Kesmai	Fox Interactive
1998	The X-Files: Unrestricted Access	Microsoft Windows	Fox Interactive	Fox Interactive
1998	Fox Sports Golf '99	PlayStation, Microsoft Windows	Gremlin Interactive	Fox Sports Interactive
1998	Fox Sports Soccer '99	PlayStation, Microsoft Windows	Gremlin Interactive	Fox Sports Interactive
1998	The X-Files Game	Microsoft Windows, Mac OS, PlayStation	HyperBole Studios	Fox Interactive
1998	James Cameron's Titanic Explorer	Microsoft Windows		Fox Interactive
1998	N2O: Nitrous Oxide	PlayStation	Gremlin Interactive	Fox Interactive
1998	Team LOSI RC Racer	PlayStation	Gremlin Interactive	Fox Interactive
1998	Fox Sports College Hoops '99	Nintendo 64	Z-Axis	Fox Sports Interactive
1998	Motorhead	PlayStation, Microsoft Windows	Gremlin Interactive	Fox Interactive
1998	Virtual K'Nex	Microsoft Windows	Imagination Pilots Entertainment	Fox Interactive
1999	Sci-Fi Pinball	Microsoft Windows, Mac OS	Gigawatt Studios	Fox Arcade
1999	Aliens Versus Predator	Microsoft Windows, OS X	Rebellion Developments	Fox Interactive
1999	Croc 2	PlayStation, Microsoft Windows	Argonaut Software	Fox Interactive
1999	NHL Championship 2000	PlayStation, Microsoft Windows	Radical Entertainment	Fox Sports Interactive
1999	NBA Basketball 2000	PlayStation, Microsoft Windows	Radical Entertainment	Fox Sports Interactive
2000	Die Hard Trilogy 2: Viva Las Vegas	PlayStation, Microsoft Windows	N-Space	Fox Interactive
2000	Croc	Game Boy Color	Virtucraft	THQ
2000	Sanity: Aiken's Artifact	Microsoft Windows	Monolith Productions	Fox Interactive
2000	Alien Resurrection	PlayStation	Argonaut Games	Fox Interactive
2000	The Operative: No One Lives Forever	Microsoft Windows, PlayStation 2, OS X	Monolith Productions	Fox Interactive
2000	King of the Hill	Microsoft Windows, OS X	Flying Tiger Development	Fox Interactive
2000	The Simpsons Bowling	Arcade	Konami	Konami
2001	Croc 2	Game Boy Color	Natsume Co., Ltd.	THQ
2001	The Simpsons: Night of the Living Treehouse of Horror	Game Boy Color	Creations	THQ
2001	Aliens: Thanatos Encounter	Game Boy Color	Crawfish Interactive	THQ
2001	The Simpsons Wrestling	PlayStation	Big Ape Productions	Activision
2001	World's Scariest Police Chases	PlayStation	Unique Development Studios	Activision
2001	Planet of the Apes	Microsoft Windows, Game Boy Advance, Game Boy Color, PlayStation	Visiware/Torus Games	Ubi Soft
2001	Aliens Versus Predator 2	Microsoft Windows, OS X	Monolith Productions	Sierra Entertainment
2001	The Simpsons: Road Rage	PlayStation 2, Xbox, GameCube	Radical Entertainment	Electronic Arts
2002	Die Hard: Nakatomi Plaza	Microsoft Windows	Piranha Games	Sierra Entertainment
2002	No One Lives Forever 2: A Spy in H.A.R.M.'s Way	Microsoft Windows, OS X	Monolith Productions	Sierra Entertainment
2002	The Simpsons Skateboarding	PlayStation 2	The Code Monkeys	Electronic Arts
2002	Ice Age	Game Boy Advance	Artificial Mind & Movement	Ubi Soft
2002	Buffy the Vampire Slayer	Xbox	The Collective	Electronic Arts
2002	Die Hard: Vendetta	GameCube, PlayStation 2, Xbox	Bits Studios	Sierra Entertainment
2002	James Cameron's Dark Angel	PlayStation 2, Xbox	Radical Entertainment	Sierra Entertainment
2002	Minority Report: Everybody Runs	GameCube, Game Boy Advance, PlayStation 2, Xbox	Treyarch/Torus Games	Activision
2003	Buffy the Vampire Slayer: Wrath of the Darkhul King	Game Boy Advance	Natsume Co., Ltd.	THQ
2003	The Simpsons: Road Rage	Game Boy Advance	Altron	THQ
2003	Aliens Versus Predator: Extinction	PlayStation 2, Xbox	Zono	Electronic Arts

=== As a label of VU Games ===
Year	Title	Platform(s)	Developer(s)	Publisher(s)
2003	Futurama	PlayStation 2, Xbox	Unique Development Studios	Vivendi Universal Games (US); SCi Games (EU)
2003	The Simpsons: Hit & Run	PlayStation 2, GameCube, Xbox, Microsoft Windows	Radical Entertainment	Vivendi Universal Games
2003	Buffy the Vampire Slayer: Chaos Bleeds	PlayStation 2, GameCube, Xbox	Eurocom	Vivendi Universal Games
2004	The X-Files: Resist or Serve	PlayStation 2	Black Ops Entertainment	Vivendi Universal Games
2005	Robots	PlayStation 2, GameCube, Xbox, Microsoft Windows, Game Boy Advance, Nintendo DS	Eurocom	Vivendi Universal Games
2005	Predator: Concrete Jungle	PlayStation 2, Xbox	Eurocom	Vivendi Universal Games
2006	Ice Age 2: The Meltdown	Wii, PlayStation 2, GameCube, Xbox, Microsoft Windows, Game Boy Advance, Nintendo DS	Eurocom	Vivendi Universal Games

=== Cancelled titles ===
Year	Title	Platform(s)	Developer(s)	Publisher(s)
1996	The Tick	PlayStation, Sega Saturn		Fox Interactive
2000	Titan A.E.	PlayStation, Microsoft Windows	Interactive Studios	Fox Interactive
