= The Simpsons Skateboarding =

2002 video game

- North American box art
- Developers: Mass Media; The Code Monkeys
- Publishers: Electronic Arts; Fox Interactive
- Artists: William Brand; Daniel Hughes; Paul Hunter
- Writers: Tim Long; Matt Selman
- Composer: Christopher Tyng
- Series: The Simpsons
- Engine: RenderWare
- Platform: PlayStation 2
- Release: NA: 12 November 2002; EU: 6 December 2002
- Genre: Sports
- Modes: Single-player, multiplayer

The Simpsons Skateboarding is a sports video game based on the animated sitcom The Simpsons. It was released for the PlayStation 2 in North America on November 12, 2002, and Europe on December 6, 2002. The game was developed by Mass Media and The Code Monkeys and published by Electronic Arts and Fox Interactive. The story and dialogue were written by writers from The Simpsons, with all character voices supplied by the cast. The game received generally negative reviews from critics.

== Gameplay ==
Springfield has been converted into a skate park for the Annual Skate Tour, full of skate-able objects and landmarks from the television series. Players are able to choose one of the nine characters available and complete for the grand prize. All of the characters' voices were recorded by the actual voice actors from The Simpsons. Each character has over forty unique moves. Players can test their skills in either a two-player head-to-head skate off, or in one of the fast and furious modes: Freeskate, Skate Fest, Trick Contest, and a game of skateboard H-O-R-S-E, unlocking additional characters, locations, and skateboards. Players can also choose to learn all the skateboard moves and tricks before they begin the actual game in the Skillz School mode.

== Development ==
The Simpsons Skateboarding was developed by Mass Media and The Code Monkeys, and published by Electronic Arts (EA Games) under license from Fox Interactive. Before EA made an official announcement about The Simpsons Skateboarding, an advertisement for the game was featured on the back page of the instruction manual for The Simpsons: Road Rage, and on in-game billboards, which was released in 2001. There were no mention of a console in the advertisement and no gameplay details were revealed. In November 2001, EA representatives said they were not ready to comment on the product. On May 16, 2002, a few days before the E3 Media and Business Summit, they released their first piece of information about the game. All of the characters' voices were recorded by the actual voice actors from The Simpsons.

== Reception ==
Reception

Aggregate score
Aggregator	Score
Metacritic	38/100

Review scores
Publication	Score
4Players	43/100
AllGame	2/5
Electronic Gaming Monthly	5/10
Eurogamer	2/10
Game Informer	1/10
GameSpot	3.9/10
GameSpy	0.5/5
GameZone	3/10
Hyper	30/100
IGN	2.5/10
Jeuxvideo.com	7/20
Joypad	4/10
PlayStation Official Magazine – Australia	5/10
Official U.S. PlayStation Magazine	1.5/5
X-Play	3/5
Cinescape	F
GameNOW	C+
Maxim	5/10
Play	2.5/5

The Simpsons Skateboarding garnered abysmal reviews from professional critics, who generally already disliked most of the prior track record with Simpsons video games. Some reviews labeled it one of the worst games of 2002, one of the worst PlayStation 2 games, and the worst all-time Simpsons video game. The general consensus was that it was devoid of redeeming qualities and shocking in its amount of failed aspects, feeling like a product conceived by marketing executives. Most reviewers recommended The Simpsons fans and skateboarding enthusiasts to avoid the game, only a couple suggesting it would appeal to hardcore fans of the show. The minority of positive publications included Play who called it the best Simpsons video game, and X-Play who concluded it was better than most video game adaptations of media properties. In 2015, HobbyConsolas ranked The Simpsons Skateboarding number 12 in a worst-to-best ranking of video games based on The Simpsons.

The controls were widely condemned as unresponsive and complicated with poor handling, and inconsistencies were noted in the physics, especially when it came to the flips and ollies. X-Play and 4Players noted unruliness in collision detection, such as successfully landing on the ground after randomly pushing buttons or grinding when clearly not near the surface to. The camera was also panned for causing quick zoom-ins and perspective changes during air tricks, which made spotting and collecting objects harder.

The level themes were praised for reflecting the show and sometimes being obscure references that would appeal to Simpsons fans. However, their design was criticized for being too simple. A common point was the low number of opportunities to pull off combos, which was attributed to the skateboarding lines, particularly their rudimentary design and low quantity. The challenges, especially those that require spelling words, were also dismissed for being mundane and ludicrous, not helped by the inclusion of a time limit.

The visuals were poorly-received. The environments garnered negative comments for their perceived plain textures, angular modeling, and low amount of polygons. While some acknowledged the faithfulness to the TV series, even they still criticized it. The most well-received aspect of the graphics were the character models, which were generally described as decent and reflective of the original characters. However, even they received some scrutiny. The animations were also poorly-received by 4Players, GameSpy and X-Play. Some reviewers were also dismayed with the absence of cel shading.

The voice clips were noted for their incorporation of the original voice actors, but the repetitive usage of them was widely condemned. The phrases, such as "my butt hurts", were criticized by some reviewers as unfunny, annoying, and by GameZone as "often strange". Reviewers were particularly annoyed by Kent Brockman's announcement of every trick the players pull off. The dependence on voice clips was also cited as an example of the game's lack of humor and poor incorporation of the license. The soundtrack was dismissed as "lousy," "uninspiring," "generic," irritating, and "a whimsical non-event of a soundtrack," its incorporation of Danny Elfman's theme particularly deried as "blasé" and "mutated." Mostly categorized as Ska, the music was generally considered unsuitable for a Simpsons property.

Some journalists reported bugs and glitches, such as pop-up, lock-ups during gameplay, and going through and getting stuck in collision. Load times were described as excessive, long, and inexcusable given the little detail in the models and textures. Reviews had conflicting coverage on the framerate; GameZone and Play claimed it was smooth and "dips just a smidgeon now and then," while others called it inconsistent, "vicious and sporadic," and having "occasional slowdown."
