= Actua Golf 2 =

1997 video game

- PAL PlayStation cover art
- Developer: Gremlin Interactive
- Publishers: EU: Gremlin Interactive; NA: Fox Interactive
- Series: Actua Sports
- Platforms: PlayStation, Microsoft Windows
- Release: PlayStation: EU: September 1997; NA: 30 June 1998; Microsoft Windows: EU: 1998; NA: 31 May 1998
- Genre: Sports
- Modes: Single-player, multiplayer

Actua Golf 2 (Fox Sports Golf '99 in North America) is a sports video game developed and published by Gremlin Interactive for PlayStation and Microsoft Windows. Development of the game was underway as of August 1997, and it was released in September 1997 in Europe, and in June 1998 in North America. A Sega Saturn version was planned, but eventually cancelled.

== Gameplay ==
The Windows version of the game has eight golf courses, and the PlayStation version has six courses. Both versions include three real courses: The Oxfordshire, Carnoustie Links, and Kiawah Island Ocean Course. Both versions of the game use a traditional click-based method to perform golf moves. The Windows version also includes a method in which the movement of the computer mouse is used to simulate the golf club. The Windows version has several multiplayer options, including modem and LAN.

Game modes include match play, skins, stroke play, four-ball, and foursome. The player can customize the golfer's appearance with selectable clothing, and can also choose a name for the golfer. The game features Peter Alliss and John Walls as golf commentators.

== Reception ==
Reception

Aggregate score
Aggregator	Score	
Aggregator	PC	PS
GameRankings	71%	39%

Review scores
Publication	Score	
Publication	PC	PS
CNET Gamecenter	7/10	N/A
Computer Games Strategy Plus	3/5	N/A
Computer Gaming World	1/5	N/A
Edge	N/A	7/10
Electronic Gaming Monthly	N/A	5.125/10
Game Informer	N/A	4.5/10
GameRevolution	B	D−
GameSpot	8.2/10	1.4/10
IGN	6/10	N/A
PlayStation Official Magazine – UK	N/A	7/10
Official U.S. PlayStation Magazine	N/A	2/5
PC Accelerator	4/10	N/A
PC Gamer (US)	68%	N/A
PCMag	3/5	N/A

The PC version received above-average reviews, while the PlayStation version received unfavourable reviews, according to the review aggregation website GameRankings. Many critics felt that the game was inferior to golf game series such as Links, Jack Nicklaus, and PGA Tour. Gordon Goble of CNET Gamecenter reviewed the Windows version and wrote that the game, "for all its charms and potential, feels unfinished. And this sense of incompleteness does not confine itself to the periphery--it will often impact the quality of your play."

Jason Zimring of GameRevolution considered the PlayStation version to be a poor game, writing, "The graphics are weak, the gameplay moves slowly, and the putting is sure to give you high blood pressure." Scott Alan Marriott of AllGame gave the same console version two-and-a-half stars out of five, writing, "In the end, it's just too hard to ignore the game's flaws despite some of the more promising features." Michael E. Ryan of PC Magazine called the game "a bit rough around the edges" and stated that it "lacks the realism provided by most of the competition, but it's a real bargain and can be lots of fun."

Some critics considered the Windows version superior to the PlayStation version. The graphics of the Windows version were well received. Calvin Hubble of GameRevolution praised the Windows version for its "damn fine" water-reflection effect, and Craig Harris of IGN praised the moving water. Tasos Kaiafas of Computer Gaming World praised graphical effects such as swaying trees and the reflective, moving water, but stated that the graphics overall were lacking in comparison to rival golf games. Ryan considered the background graphics "rather plain" but stated that the overall look of the game "is surprisingly smooth and convincing."

The putting was criticized for its difficulty. Stephen Poole of GameSpot wrote that the putting interface was "one of the most frustrating ever seen," writing, "There's very little difference in the distance on the swing meter for, say, a 50-footer and a 10-footer; in other words, the difficulty of a putt increases as the distance to the hole decreases - the exact opposite of real golf." Kaiafas wrote, "The problem is the swing meter doesn't adjust for the shorter length, so you have to do some fast clicking to get it right." Goble felt that putting was too easy when using the mouse swing method. He also criticized the design of the swing meter, describing it as a "horridly rough-looking gauge". James Mielke of GameSpot also criticized the swing meter design in his review of the PlayStation version. Ryan criticized the putting interface, which he considered poor.

The commentary received some criticism, as reviewers considered it repetitive, although Goble did not view it as such. Poole complained of an error that prevented online multiplayer matches, but he stated that the game "gives you the highest degree of control over your shot type that I've seen in a golf sim." Hubble also praised the variety of golf swings.

The game sold 120,000 units.
