= NBA Basketball 2000 =

1999 video game

- PC cover art, featuring Steve Smith
- Developer: Radical Entertainment
- Publisher: Fox Sports Interactive
- Platforms: PlayStation, Windows
- Release: NA: October 31, 1999 (PS); NA: November 3, 1999 (PC); EU: 1999
- Genre: Sports (Basketball)
- Modes: Single-player, Multiplayer

NBA Basketball 2000 is a sports video game developed by Radical Entertainment, published by Fox Sports Interactive and distributed by 20th Century Fox Home Entertainment in North America and Activision internationally for Microsoft Windows and PlayStation in 1999.

== Reception ==
Reception

Aggregate score
Aggregator	Score	
Aggregator	PC	PS
GameRankings	46%	73%

Review scores
Publication	Score	
Publication	PC	PS
AllGame	3.5/5	3/5
CNET Gamecenter	N/A	8/10
Computer Games Strategy Plus	1.5/5	N/A
Electronic Gaming Monthly	N/A	6/10
Eurogamer	4/10	N/A
GameFan	N/A	62% (Note: In GameFan's viewpoint of the PlayStation version, one critic gave it 61, and the other 62.)
GameSpot	5.1/10	7.6/10
IGN	N/A	7.2/10
PlayStation Official Magazine – UK	N/A	6/10
PC Accelerator	1/10	N/A
PC Gamer (US)	15%	N/A

The PlayStation version received above-average reviews, while the PC version received unfavorable reviews, according to the review aggregation website GameRankings.
