= The X-Files: Unrestricted Access =

1998 video game

- Developer: Fox Interactive
- Publisher: Fox Interactive
- Series: The X-Files
- Platforms: Windows, Macintosh
- Release: 1998
- Genre: Interactive database
- Mode: Single-player

The X-Files: Unrestricted Access is a Microsoft Windows and Macintosh program published by Fox Interactive and distributed by 20th Century Fox Home Entertainment as a tie-in with the television series The X-Files. Unrestricted Access is an interactive database program, compiling information from the television series' first four seasons. The program was written by Richard Dowdy.

Released in 1998, the game was met with mostly positive reviews, with its attention to detail and aesthetics considered as highlights; however, its reliance on Internet Explorer 4 was viewed as a detraction.

== Gameplay ==
Rather than a traditional video game, The X-Files: Unrestricted Access is an interactive database of information relating to the television series The X-Files. The game uses text, videos and images to offer information on the series' overarching mythology, as well as on its characters and individual episodes of the program. The database holds entries on every episode broadcast up until the game's release—the first four seasons—and culls its information from these episodes.

The game was released on two CD-ROMs—the database itself was contained on the second of these, while the first disc was used to install both the program and the Internet Explorer 4 web browser, which was used to access in-game hyperlinks. In addition to the content within the database, Unrestricted Access also contained computer wallpaper and screensavers for use on the player's computer.

== Release and reception ==
The X-Files: Unrestricted Access was released for Microsoft Windows and Macintosh computers in 1998.

The game has received generally positive reviews from critics. AllGame's Nick Smith awarded it three-and-a-half stars out of five, highlighting its attention to detail. Smith pointed out the game's relatively low retail price—at the time of release, it was marketed for approximately half the cost of an average computer game—and reacted positively to the option of downloading frequent updates from the publisher's website to keep its information current. Mike Flaherty of Entertainment Weekly rated the program a B, calling it "some good arcane fun". Flaherty complimented the program's depth and overall aesthetic, but felt that its low picture quality made some of the images and renders less informative and useful than they could have been.

A reviewer for The Michigan Daily rated the game two-and-a-half stars out of five, finding that it was a "good concept" that did not work very well in execution. The review found the requirement to navigate the program with Internet Explorer to be "painful", but that the content was enjoyable when this was overlooked; it concluded that the game was not worthwhile for anyone other than dedicated fans of the series.
