= Felix the Cat's Cartoon Toolbox =

1994 video game

- Developer: Big Top Productions
- Platforms: Windows, Classic Mac OS
- Release: 1994
- Genre: Filmmaking

Felix the Cat's Cartoon Toolbox is a filmmaking video game developed and published by Big Top Productions, Inc. and released in 1994. This CD-ROM game allowed people to create their own Saturday morning cartoons. The game was developed by Big Top and the character Felix the Cat was licensed from Felix the Cat Productions. The characters were based on the 1950s version of Felix with The Professor, Rock Bottom, Poindexter, Master Cylinder and Vavoom. The game's underlying engine was later refitted for The Simpsons: Cartoon Studio in 1996.

== Reception ==
Electronic Games gave the game B+, stating that while it takes time for a user to understand it, even more so a young child, they can still get some enjoyment upon creating something.
