= Titan A.E. (cancelled video game) =

- Developer: Interactive Studios
- Publisher: Fox Interactive
- Platforms: Windows; PlayStation
- Release: Cancelled

Titan A.E. is a cancelled video game from Fox Interactive based on the film Titan A.E. It was planned to be released for the PlayStation and PC in Fall 2000 in North America, following the film's summer release.

== Gameplay ==
The gameplay places the player in the roles of Cale or Akima as they fight Drej aliens and search for the lost ship Titan, moving through environments and characters drawn from the film while following a story that parallels it, and the player can approach the game either as a third‑person action‑adventure or from inside the cockpit of a ship, with both modes contributing to the overarching mission of salvaging what remains of the human race.

== Development ==
Titan A.E. was in development by U.K.-based Interactive Studios for Windows and PlayStation. Development on both platforms had begun in March 1999 under the film's original title Planet Ice, and an early playable version was showcased at E3 2000. In July 2000, a spokesman from the game's publisher Fox Interactive announced that development on the title had been halted largely due to the film's poor box office performance which was "only one of many different factors" that led to its cancellation.

The PlayStation version was expected to ship with the VHS and DVD release of the film.
