= The Simpsons Wrestling =

2001 video game

- Developer: Big Ape Productions
- Publishers: Fox Interactive: EU: Electronic Arts; NA: Activision
- Director: Dean Sharpe
- Producer: Dave Wisehart
- Programmers: Robert Leyland; Tom Schenck
- Writer: Jamie Angell
- Composer: Christopher Tyng
- Series: The Simpsons
- Platform: PlayStation
- Release: EU: March 23, 2001; NA: April 13, 2001
- Genre: Sports
- Modes: Single-player, multiplayer

The Simpsons Wrestling is a sports video game based on the animated television series The Simpsons for the PlayStation. Developed by Big Ape Productions and published by Fox Interactive through a co-publishing agreement with Electronic Arts in Europe and Activision in North America, the game was first released in Europe on March 23, 2001, followed by North America on April 13, 2001. It is the only Simpsons video game released for the PlayStation.

The Simpsons Wrestling features 20 playable characters, voiced by the series' regular voice cast, each of whom executes their own exclusive moves, gestures, and power moves in the wrestling ring. The matches take place in detailed 3D locations in Springfield. A round in the game ends when one wrestler pins their opponent for a three count; two wins constitute a victory. Unlike in traditional wrestling rules, the opponent may be pinned belly-down.

The game was widely panned by critics, and has since been considered by many to be one of the worst video games of all time, though the audio track was praised.

== Gameplay ==
Gameplay of The Simpsons Wrestling. Homer is only three letters away from being able to taunt his opponent, Bart.

The Simpsons Wrestling is loosely based on professional wrestling games, but more closely resembles a beat-'em up. The game can be played in two modes: a tournament style single-player game or a grudge match where two players can interact. The matches take place in ten different detailed 3D locations from Springfield, such as the Simpsons' house, the Springfield Nuclear Power Plant, the Kwik-E-Mart, and Moe's Tavern. Letters float around in the wrestling ring, and if a wrestler collects enough of them, they can taunt and temporarily become invincible. A round ends when one wrestler pins their opponent for a three count. Two rounds are needed to win a match, except for fights against Ned Flanders who heals at the end of both rounds, causing them to take 4 instead of 2.

Each time a successful attack is performed on a player, their health meter depletes. Players with low health stay stunned for longer when knocked down. A player can increase their health by picking up food items that randomly appear in the ring. Running and attacks drain stamina. If a player does not have enough stamina to perform a certain move, it becomes unavailable until they recover. Stamina is regained through not pressing the actions buttons or picking up certain items. Attacks which require more stamina are generally more effective. The stun meter only appears when the opponent is knocked down. It depletes gradually, but the stunned player cannot move until the Stun meter is completely drained. A player can reduce the stun meter faster by pressing the action buttons, or by receiving certain attacks. If a player is low on health, the stun meter will normally be higher, making pin attempts harder to resist. Once a player's health is completely depleted, it will only take one hit to stun them. Certain attacks to a stunned opponent will actually reset the stun meter.

During matches, wrestlers have a health meter that drains as they perform special moves, and gradually refills when they are not attacking. Different moves use up different amounts of energy, and certain characters can win any match by repeatedly using a particularly damaging move that does not require much energy. Several different power-ups are also available in the game, including a donut that increases speed, bowling pins that can be used as clubs, and bubble gum that slows players down.

In addition to health items, the letters A, U, N, and T appear randomly in the ring. If either player collects enough to spell the word "TAUNT", they can then perform a taunt. The taunt will completely drain the opponent's stamina, making them unable to attack for a limited time.

Various characters make cameos as background images. Each character executes their own exclusive moves and gestures.

== Development ==
Big Ape Productions developed The Simpsons Wrestling. At the Electronic Entertainment Expo in 2000, Fox Interactive announced its plans to produce and publish the game for the PlayStation console. Karly Young, director of Fox Interactive, said that the company had received an "overwhelming" response to their previous Simpsons games, so they wanted to give the fans "another dose of Bart and Homer—this time for PlayStation gamers".

In January 2001, Fox Interactive ceased operating as a standalone publisher to focus more on development, and they would now function as a co-publisher. On March 12, 2001, the company announced that Activision would co-publish and distribute the title in North America, with the publisher citing a "casual gamer interest" for their acquisition. Kathy Vrabeck, executive vice president of Activision, commented that "The Simpsons is a property that enjoys phenomenal success across several entertainment mediums, including interactive entertainment. The acquisition of this game reinforces our strategy of delivering products based on powerful, recognizable brands."

According to Big Ape Productions founder Mike Ebert and 3D artist Ray West, Fox required the character models to have black outlines, which impacted performance and necessitated reducing the screen resolution to maintain a playable frame-rate. The character select screen originally had 3D rendered models that would interact with each other, but Fox would have them replaced with concept art from the show. Ebert said that a large amount of the trash talk dialog was cut when playtesters deemed it too offensive. Fox also had them remove the Springfield Elementary School level before release due to the Columbine High School massacre.

Prior to release, series creator Matt Groening had his name removed from the game's cover. Reportedly, this came after he viewed a scene involving Groundskeeper Willie attacking Maggie with a rake, which he considered to not be appropriate for the franchise. The incident reportedly made Groening more hesitant about putting his name on subsequent Simpsons games.

== Reception ==
Reception

Aggregate score
| Aggregator | Score |
|---|---|
| Metacritic | 32/100 |

Review scores
| Publication | Score |
|---|---|
| AllGame | 2/5 |
| Electronic Gaming Monthly | 3.17/10 (Note: In Electronic Gaming Monthly's review of the game, one critic gave it 2.5/10, and the rest gave it each a score of 3.5/10.) |
| EP Daily | 5/10 |
| Game Informer | 2/10 |
| GameRevolution | F |
| GameSpot | 6.4/10 |
| GameZone | 7.5/10 |
| IGN | 1/10 |
| Next Generation | 1/5 |
| Official U.S. PlayStation Magazine | 2/5 |
| Maxim | 1.5/5 |

The Simpsons Wrestling received "generally unfavorable" reviews, according to review aggregator Metacritic. The reviewers criticized the game for having simplistic, unbalanced gameplay and bad graphics, but praised the game's audio track.

Douglass C. Perry of IGN described the game as one of the "ugliest" games he had ever seen and declared it "the most horrific demolition of a license ever". He thought the graphics were "choppy" looking, and the character outlines looked "broken up". Game Informer's Andrew Reiner criticized the game's design by saying that he did not think it held any wrestling qualities at all, and that the characters looked "awful". He said that instead of "grappling" or performing "devastating slams", you have to "slap your opponent silly" by mashing the buttons redundantly. Michael Lafferty of GameZone, however, called the graphics "quite good, though a little clipped at times by the pace of the combat". Perry also thought there was little wrestling in the game, instead it is "all about smashing buttons and not having any skill whatsoever". Reiner said that the game was a major disappointment and is "one of the worst PS games to date". Scott Steinberg of NextGen called it "A horrific, licensed beat-'em-up [sic] that's so terrible it will actually make you grateful most companies opt for kart racers instead." Michael "Major Mike" Weigand said of the game in GamePro's website-only review, "Simpsons fanatics: Rent this game before you buy. Everyone else will be better served by any other wrestling title available for the PlayStation. Doh, indeed." (Note: GamePro gave the game two 2/5 scores for graphics and control, 3/5 for sound, and 1.5/5 for fun factor.)

In contrast to the game's negative response, Lafferty said that even though the game does not feature continuous play, "the action flows well once into an event". He praised the game's audio track, and thought it was "fun" because the comedy is straight from the television show, and the characters will "bring a smile to your face". Reiner also commented positively on the soundtrack and that the game may not be the best wrestling game available, "but it delivers what the cover advertises". GameSpot's Frank Provo said that "wit" and "charm" are the two most redeeming features of The Simpsons Wrestling, and in spite of the game's weak gameplay, it has "plenty of laughs in store" that devoted fans of The Simpsons will enjoy. The BBC's David Gibbon wrote that the result of the track is one that will not "fail to impress fans".

The game received a "Gold" sales award from the Entertainment and Leisure Software Publishers Association (ELSPA), indicating sales of at least 200,000 units in the UK.

== See also ==
- List of licensed wrestling video games
- List of video games notable for negative reception
