= Buggy (video game) =

1998 video game

- European PlayStation box art
- Developer: Gremlin Interactive
- Publishers: PAL: Gremlin Interactive; NA: Fox Interactive
- Platforms: PlayStation, Microsoft Windows
- Release: NA: May 1998; EU: 1998
- Genre: Racing
- Modes: Single-player, multiplayer

Buggy is a racing game developed and published by Gremlin Interactive in 1998, and published in North America by Fox Interactive. The game was released in North America as Team Losi RC Racer due to it having a license from RC car manufacturer/racing team Team Losi.

== Gameplay ==
Players take control of one of 16 remote-controlled vehicles. To gain a given power-up, the player must drive through colored gates in a specific order.

== Reception ==
Reception

Aggregate score
Aggregator	Score	
Aggregator	PC	PS
GameRankings	N/A	52%

Review scores
Publication	Score	
Publication	PC	PS
AllGame	N/A	4/5
Electronic Gaming Monthly	N/A	4.375/10 (Note: In Electronic Gaming Monthly's review of the PlayStation version, one critic gave it a score of 5/10, another gave it 4.5/10, and the rest gave it each a score of 4/10.)
Game Informer	N/A	7/10
GamePro	N/A	2/5 (Note: GamePro gave the PlayStation version 3.5/5 for graphics, 3/5 for sound, 4/5 for control, and 2/5 for overall fun factor.)
GameSpot	N/A	4.2/10
Hyper	44%	N/A
IGN	N/A	5/10
Jeuxvideo.com	9/20	16/20
Next Generation	N/A	1/5
Official U.S. PlayStation Magazine	N/A	2.5/5

The PlayStation version received mixed reviews according to the review aggregation website GameRankings. Next Generation said, "Simply put, there isn't a single positive thing to say about Team Losi. It's about as much fun as Gremlin's last PlayStation game (Judge Dredd), and that about says it all."
