= Actua Soccer 2 =

1997 video game

- Developer: Gremlin Interactive
- Publishers: EU: Gremlin Interactive; NA: Fox Interactive
- Series: Actua Sports
- Platforms: Microsoft Windows, PlayStation
- Release: PlayStation: EU: November 1997; NA: 30 June 1998; Windows: EU: 1998; NA: 31 May 1998
- Genre: Sports
- Modes: Single-player, multiplayer

Actua Soccer 2 (Fox Sports Soccer '99 in North America) is a sports video game developed and published by Gremlin Interactive for PlayStation and Microsoft Windows.

== Release ==
The game was released on Steam by Pixel Games UK in December 2022. This version of the game is not the original Windows version, but rather an emulated port of the PlayStation version.

== Reception ==
Reception

Aggregate score
Aggregator	Score	
Aggregator	PC	PS
GameRankings	59%	57%

Review scores
Publication	Score	
Publication	PC	PS
AllGame	2.5/5	1.5/5
CNET Gamecenter	7/10	4/10
Computer Games Strategy Plus	1.5/5	N/A
Computer Gaming World	1/5	N/A
Electronic Gaming Monthly	N/A	6.375/10
EP Daily	N/A	4/10
Game Informer	N/A	7.25/10
GameRevolution	C	C−
GameSpot	4.2/10	7.3/10
Official U.S. PlayStation Magazine	N/A	2.5/5
PC Accelerator	5/10	N/A
The Cincinnati Enquirer	3.5/5	N/A

The game received mixed reviews on both platforms according to the review aggregation website GameRankings.

The game was a runner-up for "Coaster of the Year" at Computer Gaming World's 1999 Premier Awards, which went to Trespasser.

The game sold 250,000 units.
