= Anastasia: Adventures with Pooka and Bartok =

1997 video game

- Cover art
- Developer: Motion Works
- Publisher: Fox Interactive
- Producer: David Wisehart
- Platforms: Mac OS; Microsoft Windows
- Release: November 25, 1997
- Genre: Puzzle
- Mode: Single-player

Anastasia: Adventures with Pooka and Bartok is a puzzle video game based on the 1997 animated film Anastasia. Developed by Motion Works, published by Fox Interactive and distributed by 20th Century Fox Home Entertainment, the title was released on November 25, 1997. It was produced by David Wisehart, who also served as voiceover director. The game had an estimated budget of US$800,000.

== Development ==
=== Conception ===
Fox Interactive was founded in 1994 as an operating unit of Fox Filmed Entertainment. Aided by other News Corporation divisions, the company was able to "not only to select from a wide spectrum of hot properties, but to draw from significant marketing, distribution and merchandising resources". Fox properties that had previously been adapted into Fox Interactive games include The Simpsons and Die Hard. After Fox purchased the Don Bluth studios and during the development of Anastasia, an Anastasia video game was conceived to cash in on the success of the existing animated film property. Blitz Games - who would later design Fox's Titan A.E. game - was "asked to put a concept together for a PlayStation game"; while Fox executives were impressed with the results, they ultimately decided that Anastasia was not well-suited for the PlayStation and they followed the "tried-and-true" formula of the Disney's Animated Storybook series created a storybook/activity centre tie-in product for PC instead. Motion Works, an international digital technology company based in Vancouver, was chosen by Fox Interactive to develop the project. Under contract to Motion Works, Intelliscape Interactive Corp. worked on this title (Fox) alongside Cosmopolitan's Virtual Makeover (Sega).

=== Design ===
The developers were able to recruit some of the film's voice actors, including Meg Ryan who performs the voiceover for Anya's diary entries". Anastasia incorporates exploration, problem solving and skill testing, and it also incorporated songs from the animated feature film. For Anastasia, Intelliscape Interactive completed production management, 3D artwork, and game design work.

=== Release ===
The game was released on November 4, 1997. The Fox Interactive website allowed players to send virtual postcards using Anastasia music. Both this title and the video Anastasia Sing-along were involved in rebates and corporate tie-ins. The Fox Interactive game was part of a company-wide media blitz that included the units Fox Kids Network, Fox Family Channel, Fox Licensing and Merchandising, Fox Interactive as well as book publisher HarperCollins. The game marked a new direction for Fox Interactive, which had previously made first-person shooter games.

In 1997, Disney re-released The Little Mermaid as "counter-programming" to Fox's animated film Anastasia, which was set for release around the same time. The two studios were "scrambling to mine every potential dollar from their investment and make sure neither outdoes the other", so they competed in the video gaming space. Taking a cue from the Disney "marketing mode", Fox Interactive would simultaneously release the computer entertainment spin-off with its film in the video gaming marketplace. Ariel's Story Studio would compete against Anastasia: Adventures with Pooka and Bartok.

The game capped off three consecutive successful quarters for Motion Works, helping the nine-year-old company's finances greatly improve in 1997. As a result of success such as Anastasia, the company had plans to grow considerably throughout 1998.

== Synopsis ==
Anastasia and her puppy, Pooka, travel the long route from St. Petersburg to Paris to find her grandmother in the hopes of proving her true identity. Anya keeps track of her adventure in her diary, while collecting clues along the way, and runs into some game play with Bartok to defeat Rasputin's minions.

Anya's diary entries are used as a plot device to help move the story along.

== Gameplay ==
Mobygames explains the gameplay:

It features five different scenes, depicting situations from the movie. Diary entries by Anya tell the happenings between those stages. The player takes the role of the puppy Pooka and needs to solve problems and puzzles to help Anya out. When searching through the screens, Pooka may meet the minions of the villain Rasputin. Then they take him to the underworld where he has to solve action or strategy mini games. The majority of the game is a traditional point & click adventure. Bartok, the bat, plays only a secondary part and provides some advice here and there. If players are stuck, they can use the in-game hint system.

AllGame explains an example of a quest that one will encounter in the game, and the series of steps the player must take in order to reach that goal:

During the first part of the game you must find Dmitri's location in St. Petersburg. You discover a fortuneteller who can provide the information easily enough but, in order to get it, you must get something from a clothier for the seer.

== Critical reception ==
The gameplay was generally negatively received by critics. AllGame would describe it as "frustrating" due to the difficulty in locating locations and objects in the confusing interface, and the unsatisfying minigames. Quandary felt it was held back by its "relative simplicity and brevity". PC Gamer described the experience of playing the adventure as "magical". Metzomagic wrote that "as for its performance as an adventure game for children it also does a superbly entertaining job". The Boston Herald said The Little Mermaid's strong point was in its soundtrack and karaoke activity, as opposed to Anastasia's adventure game mechanics.

The audiovisuals were generally given positive reviews by critics. AllGame gave high praise to both the game's graphics and sounds, deeming them clean, clear, colorful, and nice. Quandary's felt that the title's "gorgeous graphics" made it "irresistible". Metzomagic praised the animations, graphics, sound effects, voices, and music. Meanwhile, MacAddict considered it to be "beautifully rendered yet dull". Australian Macworld deemed it "captivating, compelling and very frustrating". PC Mania felt the game had "amazing" graphics and backgrounds. Chicago Tribune reviewed Anastasia and Ariel side by side, and commented that the former is "rich with gorgeous art".

The game's characters and plot were given mixed reviews. AllGame noted the lack of interaction with characters from the film. Meanwhile, Quandary noted that the featured characters are still "entertaining". Metzomagic noted that "the story is enduring". Working Mother wrote that the game is filled with a similar kind of humour that the film does. Daily News suggested that "both [Ariel's Story Studio and Anastasia: Adventures with Pooka and Bartok] can have lives lasting far longer than the movies will be in theaters". News-Press deemed the film adaptation to be a "royal treat" and "enchanting". The Sydney Morning Herald felt it was "essential" viewing for anyone who had experienced the film.
