= Bonita Pietila =

Casting director and producer

- Born: Bonita Lynn Pietila; January 14, 1953 (age 73); Gwinn, Michigan, U.S.
- Education: Michigan State University
- Parent(s): Henry John Pietila, Ruth Eleanor Pietila (Mikkila)

Bonita Pietila (born January 14, 1953) is a casting director and producer. She is best known for her work on The Simpsons, with which she won three Emmy Awards (in 1998, 2000, and 2001). Pietila has been with the series since its beginnings on The Tracey Ullman Show in 1987.

Working as line producer and producer on the series, she has undertaken other tasks involving The Simpsons including talent coordinator on the TV short Springfield's Most Wanted, voice director on the video game The Simpsons: Virtual Springfield, and producer for the The Simpsons Take the Bowl - 3 Nights Live At the Hollywood Bowl.

Pietila has also worked on several other films and TV shows other than The Simpsons such as The Texas Chainsaw Massacre 2, The Ben Stiller Show, Teen Angel, Hollywood Dog, Tough Guys Don't Dance, Notes from Underground, Housekeeping, Surrender and the 1999 TV film adaptation of Animal Farm.

== Early life ==
Pietila is Finnish-American; she was born and raised in the Upper Peninsula of Michigan. Her grandparents had moved to the United States from Teuva, Finland.
