= Futurama (video game) =

2003 video game

- European PlayStation 2 cover art, by Bongo Comics
- Developer: Unique Development Studios
- Publishers: PAL: SCi Games; NA: Vivendi Universal Games
- Director: Stephane Koenig
- Producers: Anders Hejdenberg; Mars Westerlund
- Designers: Matt Groening; Mark McGinley
- Programmer: Mattias Olsson
- Artist: Ralph M. Gerth IV
- Writer: J. Stewart Burns
- Composer: Christopher Tyng
- Engine: Gamebryo
- Platforms: PlayStation 2; Xbox
- Release: EU: August 1, 2003; AU: August 8, 2003; NA: August 12, 2003
- Genre: Platform
- Mode: Single-player

Futurama is a 3D platform video game based on the science fiction animated series of the same name. It was developed by Unique Development Studios and published by SCi Games in Europe and Oceania and by Vivendi Universal Games in North America for the PlayStation 2 and Xbox, both of which use cel-shading technology. The game follows the main characters (Fry, Bender and Leela) and main members of delivery company Planet Express, trying to stop Billionaire Carol "Mom" Miller from acquiring over 50% percent of Earth and turning it into a giant warship, after selling Planet Express to her by its owner Professor Farnsworth, due to lack of resource and company's mismanagement.

The game has received mixed reviews from critics. While storytelling, writing, humor and voice acting was praised, many of the gameplay aspects, controls and camera were generally criticized. The cutscenes and in-game footage of the game were repurposed into a DVD feature Futurama: The Lost Adventure as a bonus in The Beast with a Billion Backs, released on June 24, 2008.

The game is considered to be as one of the rarest and most expensive games on PlayStation 2 and Xbox in a physical copy, ranging in places like eBay around $200 to $800. This is mainly due to incredibly low sales of the game, since it saw a very limited run of printings and partly due to the show's cancellation shortly after its release.

== Gameplay ==
Futurama is a 3D platform game with elements of third-person shooter (TPS). As the game progresses, players play as each of four characters: Fry, Bender, Leela and Zoidberg. Fry's levels mostly involve third-person shooter (TPS) mechanics, as he can use a multitude of guns. Bender's levels are platformer-oriented, while Leela's revolve around hand-to-hand combat. Zoidberg is featured in a short segment as well.

During levels, if a player receives damage and loses health by getting hit by an enemy, a level hazard or a fall from a high distance, it can be recovered by health pick-ups, each being character-specific. (Note: Health Pick-ups for each playable character in Futurama (video game): Fry: Cans of Slurm; Bender: Olde Fortran and Robot Oil; Leela: Vitamins; Zoidberg: N/A) They feature two variants: the first one restores a quarter of health (25 HP), and the second one restores it to its full (100 HP). Valuable collectibles are scattered throughout each level; similarly to health pick-ups, they are character specific. (Note: Valuable collectibles for each playable character in Futurama (video game): Fry: United States dollar; Bender: Robobium; Leela: Gold bars; Zoidberg: Fish skeleton) Collecting 25 of them will grant an extra charge for the Re-animator, serving as an extra life. Running out of them will result in a game over. In each level there are several hidden Nibblers captured and imprisoned for Mom's evil plans; the player can break the cage and collect them. Collecting Nibblers unlocks extras such as movie clips and galleries.

== Plot ==
The game begins with Professor Farnsworth, wearing a sombrero, selling the Planet Express delivery company to Mom, explaining that it had been losing money for years due to mismanagement. The buyout gives Mom ownership of more than 50% percent of Earth, allowing her to become the planet's supreme ruler. Soon after this, she enslaves humanity.

Finding the ship inexplicably broken, the Professor tasks Leela and Bender with repairing it, and sends Fry off to find a hammer to keep him out of the way. After Fry is crushed to death under a pile of debris, he is resurrected by the Professor's new invention, the Re-animator (which closely resembles a giant toaster), which brings the crew back to life every time they die. Fry is then tasked with locating the Professor's missing tools. After discovering that the ship's dark matter engine is beyond repair, and informing the crew that the back-up was pawned in exchange for a gun, the Professor sends Fry off to retrieve it, having to travel via the sewers to avoid curfew. After Fry returns, they escape from Earth with the Re-animator. However, Mom pursues them in an effort to capture Farnsworth. She hopes to turn Earth into a giant warship, and Farnsworth is the only person who knows how to build an engine large enough to move the Earth. After Bender frees the ship from a suck beam generated from a desert asteroid, Mom ultimately captures Farnsworth, places his head in a jar, and sends the ship hurtling into the Sun with Fry, Leela, and Bender on board.

After discovering that the Sun is habitable, Leela helps the Sun People to defeat their evil Sun God in exchange for a full tank of dark matter. After Leela destroys the Sun Temple, the crew then head for the planet of Bogad, where Farnsworth's mentor, Adoy, lives. Adoy has invented a time machine, but its generator is inconveniently placed a great distance away, with hazardous swamps in the way. Using the time machine's hand crank, which turns back time by two minutes if cranked for that long, Zoidberg (who had inexplicably appeared on Bogad "making a cameo") manages to reach and activate the generator. Fry, Leela and Bender manage to travel back to a few minutes before Mom buys Planet Express from the Professor. However, the ship crashes into Planet Express, destroying the ship. This prompts them to steal the ship of the past, leaving the broken ship to be repaired by their past selves. They attempt to stop the sale, which prompts Mom to send Destructor to attack them. They defeat the robot, but the Re-animator gets damaged and falls on Destructor, causing it to fall on top of them. Angry at the fact that the robot killed his crew, the professor refuses to sell Planet Express. But after Mom bribes him with a sombrero, he sells, and the events of the game continue in an endless cycle.

== Development ==
Futurama was developed by Swedish game developer Unique Development Studios (UDS), which acquired the rights to develop a video game adaptation of the series in September 2000, following the series' success, first announced by its creator Matt Groening at Comic-Con in July, for the next-gen consoles, the Xbox and PlayStation 2.

Many of the series crew members was involved in development of the game. Matt Groening served as Executive game developer, and David X. Cohen directed the voice acting of the original actors from the series like: Billy West, Katey Sagal, John DiMaggio, Tress MacNeille, Maurice LaMarche, and David Herman. Also adding to the authenticity of the game the soundtrack provided by Christopher Tyng exclusively for the game, who also composed the music in the series. And Futurama scriptwriter and producer J. Stewart Burns who scripted an original storyline for the plot, introduced characters never seen in the show prior. The Art director of the show and the comic Mili Smythe, oversaw the approvals of all character model in the game. The manual, Box art and artwork was provided by Bongo Comics.

Development on the game started before the series' cancellation, but the game was not released until after the last episode of season 4 had already been shown. The game includes 28 minutes of new animation.

== Release ==
Swedish game developer Unique Development Studios had acquired the rights to develop the game in September, along with planned handheld game for Game Boy Color, meant to be released in 2002, but which was never produced. A GameCube version was also announced after game was delayed to financial year of 2003.

The game was showcased at E3 in May 2003. It was released on PlayStation 2 and Xbox in Europe on August 1, 2003. In Australia on August 8, while in North America, it was released on August 13. That same month, the GameCube version was later confirmed to be cancelled in United States, due to the console's slow and low sales. While there were debates about the European release, with IGN claiming its release during the game's launch, It was ultimately cancelled due to similar reasons a month prior.

== Reception ==
Reception

Aggregate score
Aggregator	Score	
Aggregator	PS2	Xbox
Metacritic	59/100	58/100

Review scores
Publication	Score	
Publication	PS2	Xbox
AllGame	2/5	N/A
Electronic Gaming Monthly	4.83/10	4.83/10
Eurogamer	N/A	5/10
Game Informer	5.25/10	N/A
GamePro	3/5	N/A
GameRevolution	N/A	C−
GameSpot	4.9/10	4.9/10
GameSpy	2/5	2/5
GameZone	7/10	N/A
IGN	6.7/10	6.7/10
Official U.S. PlayStation Magazine	2.5/5	N/A
Official Xbox Magazine (US)	N/A	5/10
X-Play	3/5	N/A
Maxim	6/10	6/10
Strana Igr	6.5/10	6.5/10

Futurama received "mixed" reviews from critics. A video game review aggregator Metacritic. critics praised game's cutscenes and humor, but Gameplay was generally criticized.

Gameplay was generally considered lackluster, though the cutscenes were described in Wired as "side-splitting".

Douglass C. Perry from an American video game and entertainment media website IGN gave the game 6.7 out of 10, and praised game's story, Cel-shaded visual, sound design, cutscenes, voice-acting and its performance, though criticized its cheap and unforgiving AI, poor collision detection, punishing and frustrating difficulty, shoddy controls, and overall bearable roughness and distinct lack of polish in both playability and graphic finesse of the gameplay.

Tim Tracy of an American video game and entertainment media website GameSpot gave 4.9/10 (Poor). Though praised voice-acting, cutscenes, Cel-shaded visual, writing and plot overall, criticized was camera and targeting (aiming) system.

Alex Porter of Maxim said: "It's too bad that clunky controls and eh game play stay forever buried in a time lock of dull sloppiness."

Russian magazine Strana Igr gave the game 6.5 out of 10, calling the game ordinary and uninteresting.

== Legacy ==
=== Related media ===
Cutscenes and some in-game footage were compiled into a 30-minute feature titled Futurama: The Lost Adventure, provided by Cohen, described by him as "the 73rd episode" of the show. Included as a special feature with the direct-to-DVD movie Futurama: The Beast with a Billion Backs, released on June 24, 2008. With Unique Development Studios having gone out of business, the production team were unable to acquire the original full-quality video files for the cutscenes, and instead sourced the footage by recording video from an Xbox console running the game. The Lost Adventure compilation also removes meta references to being a video game and adds new effects to the sound mix. The music during the end credits of the game were later used in the four DVD Futurama films; in the extended intro of Bender's Big Score, and rearranged versions during the end credits of the subsequent three films (The Beast with a Billion Backs, Bender's Game, and Into the Wild Green Yonder).

=== Easter eggs ===
In July 2019, a YouTuber "Oddheader", discovered an Easter egg, hidden in the first level of the game, Planet Express, which is a giant easter egg hidden behind a wall. It can be triggered by collecting a certain amount of collectibles and smashing the television. Prior to the discovery, it was unknown how to reach it without using cheats or camera hacking, or even modifying the game's coding, script, and files.
