= The Pagemaster (video game) =

1994 video game

- European Mega Drive box art
- Developer: Probe Software (Note: Bonus 3D Subgame for the Genesis/Mega Drive version programmed by Atod.)
- Publisher: Fox Interactive: EU: Virgin Interactive Entertainment (SNES/GB)
- Platforms: Genesis/Mega Drive, Super NES, Game Boy
- Release: Genesis/Mega Drive: NA: November 23, 1994; EU: December 1994; Super NES: NA: November 23, 1994; EU: 1994; Game Boy: NA: November 23, 1994; EU: 1994
- Genre: Platform
- Mode: Single-player

The Pagemaster is a platform game developed by Probe Software and published by Fox Interactive for the Super Nintendo Entertainment System, Game Boy, and Sega Genesis in 1994. It was released in conjunction with the film of the same name.

== Gameplay ==
Richard Tyler can be guided through a selection of literature genre-themed levels, ranging from horror to adventure and fantasy worlds. Magic can be used, and stomping enemies to death by jumping on their heads is permitted. Enemies include bats, flying books, giant hands, ghosts, pirates, and more.

== Reception ==
Reception

Review scores
Publication	Score		
Publication	Game Boy	Sega Genesis	SNES
AllGame	N/A	2.5/5	2.5/5
Computer and Video Games	79/100	N/A	83/100
Electronic Gaming Monthly	N/A	6/10 (Note: In Electronic Gaming Monthly's review of the Genesis version, three critics scored it 6/10, one 5/10, another 7/10.)	7/10, 7/10, 6/10, 6/10
GamePro	3/5 (Note: GamePro gave the Game Boy version two 3.5/5 ratings for graphics and sound, and two 2.5/5 scores for control and fun factor.)	3/5 (Note: GamePro scored the Genesis version 3.5/5 twice for graphics and sound, 2/5 for control, and 3/5 for fun factor.)	3.5/5 (Note: GamePro scored the SNES version 3.5/5 twice for sound and fun factor, 4/5 for graphics, and 3/5 for control.)
Hyper	N/A	60%	N/A
Mean Machines Sega	N/A	74/100	N/A
Mega Fun	N/A	65%	67%
Nintendo Power	N/A	N/A	3.1/5 (Note: Nintendo Power, in the early 1990s, scored games based on four factors in reviews: graphics/sound, play control, challenge, and theme/fun. The SNES version was ranked 3/5 in all except graphics, which was rated 3.4/5.)
Official Nintendo Magazine	68/100	N/A	73/100
Super Game Power	N/A	N/A	3.8/5
Total!	N/A	N/A	71/100
Video Games (DE)	64%	N/A	69%
Games World	N/A	N/A	78/100
GB Action	76%	N/A	N/A
Mega	N/A	N/A	N/A
Mega Zone	N/A	N/A	N/A
Nintendo Acción	N/A	N/A	N/A
Play Time	N/A	67%	58%
Super Gamer	N/A	N/A	68/100

GamePro gave the SNES version a mixed review. They criticized the poor controls and repetitiveness, but they praised the graphics for their colorful and effective recreations of the settings for famous novels. The four reviewers of Electronic Gaming Monthly also considered it a just above average game. They praised the movie-like graphics and audio, but criticized the controls, saying the character tends to slide around, and felt the game to be generally uninteresting. They held the Genesis version in lower regard, commenting that "this game would be enjoyable, but the control just isn't there". GamePro similarly commented that the Genesis version is good in most respects, but the poor controls make it an overall mediocre game.

Reviewing the Game Boy version, GamePro praised the diverse gameplay, detailed graphics, and atmospheric music, but remarked that the poor control ruins the entire experience, noting the game requires excessive precision and slippery control for the jumps.

== Sales ==
The game shipped more than 100,000 copies.
