= Independence Day (video game) =

1997 video game

- North American PlayStation cover art
- Developer: Radical Entertainment
- Publisher: Fox Interactive
- Producers: Mike Arkin; Jack Rebbetoy
- Programmers: Darrin Brown; Colin O'Connor; Mike Slett; Scott Wardle
- Composer: Marc Baril
- Platforms: Microsoft Windows, PlayStation, Sega Saturn
- Release: NA: March 11, 1997; EU: June 13, 1997
- Genre: Combat flight simulator
- Modes: Single-player, multiplayer

Independence Day is a combat flight simulator video game based on the 1996 film of the same name. The game was developed by Radical Entertainment, published by Fox Interactive and distributed by 20th Century Fox Home Entertainment in North America and Electronic Arts internationally for Microsoft Windows, PlayStation and Sega Saturn.

== Gameplay ==
Independence Day is a 3D combat flight simulator comprising 13 missions with time limits; failure to complete a mission in the allotted time results in failure. Once the main objective is completed, the timer drops down to 45 seconds to take out the primary weapon. If the timer goes to 0, the primary weapon destroys the level. The game also features portals that transport the player to another area by flying through them; these sub-levels have their own separate objectives that must be completed before the player can return to the main level.

At the start of each level the player has the ability to choose which aircraft they wish to fly (the player also has Steve Hiller acting as a wingman that will fly the same type of plane as him). The player starts the game with the F/A-18 Hornet, and additional planes are unlocked mid-level by flying through an icon representing them. These planes are then available to fly the next time the player starts a level.

The first 10 levels have at least one plane each, or two if that level has a sublevel as every one also has one plane. Unlockable planes include the A-10 Warthog, Eurofighter Typhoon, F-15 Eagle, F-22 Raptor, YF-22, Northrop YF-23, F-117 Nighthawk, Grumman X-29, and the Sukhoi Su-27. Each plane has its own unique characteristics as measured by speed, agility, durability, and stealth; the last determines how much enemy fire the player attracts. If the player is shot down, whichever plane they were flying is lost and no longer available. If the player runs out of planes, the game is over.

The game also features multiplayer capabilities, either playing head-to-head on the same console in a split screen mode or with two televisions and two consoles by utilizing the PlayStation Link Cable or Saturn Link Cable. The Windows version also has an online option.

== Development ==
The PlayStation and Saturn versions of the game were developed simultaneously.

Fox Interactive originally announced that the game would be released in late 1997 or early 1998. This was later moved up to November 22, 1996 in order to coincide with the film's release on VHS, only to be subsequently pushed back to February 1997.

== Reception ==
Reception

Aggregate score
Aggregator	Score
GameRankings	49% (PS)

Review scores
Publication	Score
Edge	3/10 (SAT)
Game Players	5.3/10 (PS)
GameSpot	5.5/10 (PS)
Hyper	68/100 (PC)
IGN	2/10 (PS)
Next Generation	2/5 (PS)
PC PowerPlay	85% (PC)
Sega Saturn Magazine	59% (SAT)

Independence Day received mixed to negative reviews. Most critics remarked that the game is solidly playable, but becomes dry and repetitive due to the lack of variety in the objectives. GameSpot, for example, said that "each new challenge is roughly the same as the previous... you fly around, use your radar to locate your targets, lock on, and destroy them with your heat seeking missiles. Each new level brings a sense of deja vu that can make the Eiffel Tower level feel the same as the Grand Canyon [level]."

GamePro additionally found the gameplay overly cramped due to the boundaries set by the alien mothership, the buildings on the ground, and the surrounding force field, and assessed the game as too easy to provide any longevity for flight combat fans. However, the reviewer added that "mid-level jet jocks who give this game a chance could find that Independence is worth fighting for." IGN was far more harsh, claiming "grainy and undefined" graphics and unrealistic physics. Sega Saturn Magazine's Matt Yeo agreed that the texture maps are poorly defined, while other critics cited problems with pop up.

Yeo and GameSpot both found that while the two-player mode is a fun addition, the split-screen option suffers from slowdown and the link cable option has the usual logistical difficulties of link cable gaming, namely that it requires two televisions and two gaming consoles to be set up in the same house. However, a Next Generation critic found the entire multiplayer concept of the game to be flawed: "The only thing more tedious than the one-player game is the two-player game, in which two players (via split-screen or link cable) fly in circles until the words 'target locked' appear on screen. At that point, both players press fire, and the first one to hit wins." GamePro summarized that "Like the blockbuster movie, ID4 on the Saturn delivers energetic but shallow jet-jockey action." The PlayStation version held a 49% score on aggregating review website GameRankings based on five reviews.

Despite the unfavorable critical response, the game saw strong sales upon release.
