= NHL Championship 2000 =

1999 video game

- Game cover featuring Mike Modano.
- Developer: Radical Entertainment
- Publisher: Fox Sports Interactive
- Composer: Graig Robertson
- Platforms: PlayStation, Windows
- Release: NA: September 29, 1999 (PS); NA: November 4, 1999 (PC); EU: 1999
- Genre: Sports
- Modes: Single-player, Multiplayer

NHL Championship 2000 is a video game developed by Radical Entertainment, published by Fox Sports Interactive and distributed by 20th Century Fox Home Entertainment in North America and Activision internationally for Microsoft Windows and PlayStation in 1999.

== Reception ==
Reception

Aggregate score
Aggregator	Score	
Aggregator	PC	PS
GameRankings	69%	73%

Review scores
Publication	Score	
Publication	PC	PS
AllGame	2.5/5	4.5/5
CNET Gamecenter	5/10	7/10
Computer Games Strategy Plus	2.5/5	N/A
Computer Gaming World	3/5	N/A
Electronic Gaming Monthly	N/A	6.75/10
Eurogamer	N/A	6/10
Game Informer	N/A	7.25/10
GameFan	N/A	76% (Note: in GameFan's viewpoint of the PlayStation version, one critic gave it 81, and the other 71.)
GamePro	N/A	2.5/5 (Note: GamePro gave the PlayStation version two 3/5 scores for graphics and control, 4/5 for sound, and 2.5/5 for overall fun factor.)
GameSpot	8/10	7.9/10
GameZone	8.3/10	N/A
IGN	N/A	9.1/10
Official U.S. PlayStation Magazine	N/A	3/5
PC Gamer (US)	70%	N/A
USA Today	N/A	3/4

The game received average reviews on both platforms according to the review aggregation website GameRankings.
