= Die Hard Trilogy 2: Viva Las Vegas =

2000 video game

- Developer: n-Space
- Publisher: Fox Interactive
- Producers: Marcus Lindblom; Gary Sheinwald
- Designers: Andy Paciga; Joel Carrol; Rik Levins
- Programmers: Shawn Leaf; John M. Meyers
- Artists: Bradley Weckman; W. Randy King
- Platforms: PlayStation, Windows
- Release: PlayStation: NA: February 29, 2000; EU: April 28, 2000; Windows: NA: March 8, 2000; EU: July 21, 2000
- Genres: Third-person shooter, light gun shooter, racing
- Mode: Single-player

Die Hard Trilogy 2: Viva Las Vegas is a video game developed by n-Space and published by Fox Interactive for Microsoft Windows and PlayStation in 2000. It is a sequel to Die Hard Trilogy, which was based on the Die Hard series of action movies. Like its predecessor, the game features three different types of level design; 3rd person Action/Adventure segments (third-person shooter), Sharpshooting segments (light gun railshooting), and Extreme Driving segments (car chase driving levels). Unlike Die Hard Trilogy, which has three separate storylines based on the first three Die Hard films, Die Hard Trilogy 2 has a single original storyline that alternates between the three genres throughout the levels.

== Gameplay ==
Unlike the original Die Hard Trilogy, the different sub-games or genres found in Die Hard Trilogy 2: Viva Las Vegas (3rd person Action/Adventure, Sharpshooting, and Extreme Driving) are integrated into "Movie Mode" with the player moving from game to game as they progress rather than selecting a single stand-alone game genre to play through. However, an individual sub-game can still be selected via "Arcade Mode".

Screenshot showing third-person shooter segment

The 3rd person Action/Adventure segments feature more advanced enemy AI in comparison to its predecessor with enemies walking patrol paths, actively looking for the player and responding to noises made by the player. Stealth elements are also incorporated into the game. A variety of standard weapons are available along with less traditional weapons such as flamethrower, shock rifle and jackhammer.

In addition to the standard PlayStation controller, the PlayStation Mouse, light guns, and steering wheels can be used in the relevant parts of the game.

== Plot ==
John McClane is living in an apartment in New York City until he receives a phone call from Kenny Sinclair, his best friend in the NYPD, to come to Las Vegas. Kenny was appointed as the new warden of the Mesa Grande Prison and is throwing a party in his honor. McClane accepts the invitation. At the party, McClane gets into a brief conversation about a prisoner named Klaus Von Haug and meets Reese Hoffman, the owner of the Roaring 20's Casino, and his secretary Elena Goshkin. However, during the party, a prison riot occurs, and Von Haug escapes from his prison cell, which means McClane must defeat terrorists again.

As the game progresses, it is revealed that Kenny, Reese, and Elena are all in on the terrorist plot in their attempt to control Las Vegas. McClane dispatches them all, with Kenny being saved for last.

== Development ==
Fox Interactive asked Picture House, a development studio which included key members of the team behind the original Die Hard Trilogy, to develop the sequel. Weary of the Die Hard franchise, Picture House turned down the offer in favor of working on Terracon.

Rapper Lil' Zane wrote and performed an original track as the game's main menu theme.

== Reception ==
Reception

Aggregate score
Aggregator	Score	
Aggregator	PC	PS
GameRankings	60%	59%

Review scores
Publication	Score	
Publication	PC	PS
CNET Gamecenter	4/10	2/10
Computer Games Strategy Plus	1.5/5	N/A
Electronic Gaming Monthly	N/A	6.125/10 (Note: In Electronic Gaming Monthly's review of the PlayStation version, two critics gave it each a score of 6.5/10, one gave it 6/10, and the other gave it 5.5/10.)
EP Daily	N/A	5/10
Game Informer	N/A	7/10
GameFan	N/A	(G.H.) 81% 72% (Note: In GameFan's viewpoint of the PlayStation version, three critics gave it each a score of 70, 66, and 79.)
GameRevolution	N/A	D
GameSpot	3.8/10	6.3/10
GameSpy	64%	N/A
IGN	5.7/10	3.5/10
Next Generation	N/A	2/5
Official U.S. PlayStation Magazine	N/A	2/5
PC Accelerator	5/10	N/A
PC Gamer (US)	34%	N/A

Die Hard Trilogy 2: Viva Las Vegas received mixed reviews on both platforms according to the review aggregation website GameRankings.

IGN's Sam Bishop criticized the PlayStation version for failing to perfect any of the three gameplay genres featured, and stated that "there's really nothing to enjoy". He did give credit to the generally solid framerate and decent animations, despite bland textures. GameRevolution described the music as "awful" and criticized the same PS version's camera for allowing the player to see through walls. Additionally, the light-gun segments are noted as being terrible, despite praise received in the original game. Of the driving segments of the same console version, the review stated that "whoever designed this part of the game should be sent to prison". NextGen's Daniel Erickson said of the same PS version, "A perfect example of trying to do everything while accomplishing nothing, Die Hard Trilogy 2 is a mess of poorly executed gameplay ideas and dated graphics."

Enid Burns of GamePro said that the PC version "offers a lot for fans of the Die Hard Trilogy, and brings the feeling of being in the movie to anyone who appreciates the action." (Note: GamePro gave the PC version two 3/5 scores for graphics and control, 4/5 for sound, and 4.5/5 for overall fun factor.) Lou Gubrious said of the PlayStation version in one review, "Like most sequels, DHT2 has its moments but pales in comparison to the original." (Note: GamePro gave the PlayStation version two 3.5/5 scores for graphics and overall fun factor, 3/5 for sound, and 2.5/5 for control in one review.) In another GamePro review, however, Boba Fatt said that the same console version's "three great gaming engines make it a tremendous value. Despite minor drawbacks, this is one of the rare movie tie-in games that truly capture the feel of their cinematic parents. Check it out!" (Note: GamePro gave the PlayStation version two 4/5 scores for graphics and sound, and two 4.5/5 scores for control and fun factor in another review.)

Cal Nguyen of AllGame gave the PC version three-and-a-half stars out of five, saying, "You'll go out with a bang in Die Hard Trilogy 2: Viva Las Vegas if you learn to overcome some of the problems. It's no piece of cake but it's pretty fair in general. Those fans of the action-oriented genre and those who dig the movie series are going to give this one a whirl, while those who are just casual action game enthusiasts could at least get a closer look before they Die Hard. And no, there's no Elvis Presley end boss." However, he gave the PlayStation version three stars out of five, saying, "Overall, playing this title brings back fond memories of the three Die Hard movies. Those new to the PlayStation will want to add this game to their collection simply because of the variety in play mechanics, but those who already own the original Die Hard Trilogy will likely be disappointed that more wasn't added."
