= Alien Trilogy =

1996 video game

- European PlayStation box art
- Developer: Probe Entertainment
- Publisher: Acclaim Entertainment
- Designer: Matthew Nagy
- Programmers: Greg Michael; David Shea
- Composer: Stephen Root
- Platforms: PlayStation, Sega Saturn, MS-DOS
- Release: PlayStation: NA: February 29, 1996; EU: March 29, 1996; Saturn: NA: August 13, 1996; EU: September 4, 1996; MS-DOS: NA: December 2, 1996; EU: 1996
- Genre: First-person shooter
- Mode: Single-player

Alien Trilogy is a 1996 first-person shooter video game developed by Probe Entertainment and published by Acclaim Entertainment for the PlayStation, Sega Saturn, and MS-DOS. The game is based on the first three movies in the Alien film series. One of the first games developed by Probe following their acquisition by Acclaim, it debuted Acclaim's much-hyped motion capture technology. The game was well received by critics, who praised its recreation of the films' atmosphere and its gameplay depth compared to other first-person shooters, and was a commercial success.

== Gameplay ==
The game consists of 30 levels and 3 bosses. It implements many elements from Alien film series, including enemies such as facehuggers and chestbursters, weapons such as the pulse rifle from Aliens, and other equipment such as a shoulder lamp, which can be used by the player. The console versions only have a single player campaign whereas the DOS version also features deathmatch network multiplayer.

== Plot ==
In the role of Lieutenant Ellen Ripley, the player experiences a story loosely derived from the first three films of the Alien franchise. Aside from occasional CGI cut scenes, the plot is told through text-based mission briefings that guide the player through an expanded, action-oriented story, drawing upon the settings and characters of the franchise rather than through the specific plots of the films themselves. The game begins in essentially the same manner as Aliens, as Ripley—here a marine herself—travels to LV426 to restore contact with the colony there. The other marines are wiped out, so Ripley must then travel through the infested colony and prison facility, and finally the crashed alien ship itself, to destroy the aliens and escape.

== Development ==
In early 1994, Acclaim announced that Alien Trilogy would be the first game to use the 3D motion capture technology created by their engineering team Advanced Technologies Group. The aliens' movements were created using this technology.

Many of the game's sound effects, such as the cocooned colonists whispering "Kill me" and the alien screeches, were sampled from the films.

== Reception ==
Reception

Aggregate score
Aggregator	Score
GameRankings	78% (PS)

Review scores
Publication	Score
AllGame	4/5 (SAT); 3.5/5 (PS1)
Electronic Gaming Monthly	8.5/10, 9/10, 9/10, 9/10 (PS)
Famitsu	7/10, 6/10, 7/10, 6/10 (PS)
GameRevolution	B+
GameSpot	7.7/10 (SAT)
IGN	8/10 (PS)
Next Generation	4/5 (PS, SAT)
Maximum	4/5 (PS)
Sega Saturn Magazine	89% (SAT)

Alien Trilogy received generally positive reviews from critics. On aggregating review website GameRankings, the PlayStation version held a 78% based on 5 reviews. The four reviewers of Electronic Gaming Monthly gave the PlayStation version their "Game of the Month" award, concurring it to be the best video game based on the Alien franchise yet, chiefly due to the graphics and sound effects authentically recreating the style of the films. Two of the reviewers also commented that the use of mission objectives gives the game more depth than the average first person shooter. GamePro also commented positively on the sound effects but was not impressed by the graphics, remarking that though they are faithful to the films, they are overly monochrome and suffer from extreme pixelation. The reviewer also complained of targeting problems but gave the game a strong recommendation due to "the fun of cruising the halls, wiping out aliens, and torching and detonating the area." A reviewer for Maximum likewise was pleased with the sound effects but felt the graphics to be authentic to the films yet unimpressive, remarking that the animation on the aliens is a severe disappointment after Acclaim's considerable boasting about their new motion capture technology. He also criticized the slow pace and weak weapons, but praised the game's limited field of vision for creating a claustrophobic, suspenseful atmosphere and concluded that Alien Trilogy "is far more impressive than the mediocre offerings PlayStation owners have had to put up with over the last few months, with a depth of gameplay and audio-visual quality which is sure to impress just about everyone who buys it." A Next Generation critic hailed the game as both a strong first-person shooter and an excellent adaptation of the film series, and said the opening full motion video "is one of the best intros we've seen." While citing minor issues with confusing level designs, he emphasized that "The details, however, are what make this come alive: face huggers scuttle away, full grown aliens drop down from above, alien queens are not easy to kill, glass shatters, barrels explode, and, for the most part, the way it controls is so smooth and intuitive that the experience is very close to finding yourself in the middle of the film." IGN criticized the confusing level layout but praised the intuitive controls, interactive environment, and generally strong film-to-video-game translation.

The Saturn port was also positively received. A Next Generation critic hailed it as a rare example of a PlayStation-to-Saturn port which is just as good as the PlayStation original. However, GameSpot and GamePro said the graphics are not as "crisp" as the PlayStation version, though still good in absolute terms. Sega Saturn Magazine's Rad Automatic did not mention the PlayStation version at all. Both he and GameSpot focused their praises on the game's effective use of sound to create atmosphere and clue the player in to the close proximity of unseen enemies. Despite their positive assessments, GamePro and Sega Saturn Magazine both said the game fell second to PowerSlave, another first-person shooter released for the Saturn at roughly the same time.

Alien Trilogy was a finalist for the Computer Game Developers Conference's 1996 "Best Adaptation of Linear Media" Spotlight Award, but lost the prize to I Have No Mouth, and I Must Scream. It was awarded Electronic Gaming Monthly's Shooter Game of the Year. In 1996, GamesMaster rated the game 46th in their "Top 100 Games of All Time."

In a retrospective review, Irwin Fletcher of Game Revolution praised the high production values, commenting that "Alien Trilogy is nothing revolutionary, but it's a damn good shooter."

The PlayStation version was a bestseller in the UK.

== See also ==
- List of Alien, Predator and Alien vs. Predator games
- Die Hard Trilogy
