= Die Hard: Vendetta =

2002 first-person shooter video game

- Developer: Bits Studios
- Publishers: Vivendi Universal Games (Note: Released in Europe under the NDA Productions brand and in North America by Sierra Entertainment); Fox Interactive
- Director: Mario Aguera
- Designers: Mario Aguera; Danny Carr
- Programmer: Steven Goodwin
- Artist: Derek Siddle
- Writers: Mario Aguera; Danny Carr
- Composers: Frank R. Favre; Dylan Beale; Giedrius Kudzinskas
- Platforms: GameCube, PlayStation 2, Xbox
- Release: GameCube: EU: November 15, 2002; NA: November 19, 2002; PlayStation 2 & Xbox: EU: June 27, 2003
- Genre: First-person shooter
- Modes: Single-player, multiplayer

Die Hard: Vendetta is a 2002 first-person shooter video game developed by Bits Studios and co-published by Fox Interactive and Vivendi Universal Games for the GameCube. It was later released for the PlayStation 2 and Xbox only in Europe in 2003. Taking place after the first three Die Hard films, players take on terrorists as John McClane. Reginald VelJohnson reprises his role as Sgt. Al Powell. McClane's daughter, Lucy, is an L.A.P.D. member in the game. The game received mixed reviews from critics.

== Gameplay ==
Vendetta separates itself from other first person shooter games with its puzzle like elements. This includes hostage situations which have multiple outcomes, environmental puzzles and NPC interactions. John McClane can communicate to various NPCs in order to gain advice on how to overcome numerous situations in the game.

McClane can also take enemies hostage which cause other enemy AI to react differently depending on the rank of the hostage. Headshots in the game are rewarded by showing a panoramic camera sequence that uses a 'bullet time' effect (similar to an effect in Max Payne where the last dispatched enemy would have an almost-alike panoramic camera).

The game features an ability called "Hero Time" which allows the player to slow down time whilst retaining their own speed. This can be useful for saving hostages, which is a common theme along the game. When in Hero Time, the musical piece Symphony No. 9 "Ode to Joy" by Beethoven plays. To earn more Hero Time, the player must perform a heroic act such as saving a hostage.

== Story ==
Five years after the events of Die Hard With a Vengeance, John McClane returns to the LAPD task force after an extended absence. After refreshing his skills in a training exercise, McClane goes home to watch the unveiling of a painting that was recovered from an expedition in South America by Piet Gruber (the son of Hans Gruber, the main villain from the first Die Hard film). As the unveiling begins, Lucy (McClane's daughter, now a police officer) witnesses robbers attempting to leave with artwork, and gunfire erupts, panicking the crowd. McClane rushes to the Townsend Museum to rescue his daughter. Once there, McClane is notified that the robbers have sealed themselves in and taken hostages, including Lucy. McClane enters the museum and begins his search for the hostages, taking out several criminals in the process. After saving Dick Thornberg and Christopher von Laden (the museum's curator), McClane rescues Lucy.

McClane takes a stroll on Hollywood Boulevard when the chief notifies him of two murders at a diner not far from the former's location. McClane (disguised as a criminal) neutralizes Sergio, the perpetrator of the murders, and takes the latter's membership card, gaining access to the club where Sergio's crew is having a meeting. Quickly dispatching Sergio's men, McClane learns that the stolen artwork is hidden in a Chinese movie theater and makes his way there. Saving the hostages, McClane dwells into the subways to retrieve the missing artwork. He overhears a conversation between von Laden (secretly in league with Piet) and Jack Frontier, a former U.S. Army soldier and CIA operative turned actor turned criminal for hire. Frontier pushes off von Laden's concerns about the plan and orders him to go into hiding. Retrieving fragments of the artwork, McClane manages to find a distraught von Laden, telling him that Frontier wants the curator dead. The two escape into the city's aqueduct, where Lucy meets up with them and takes von Laden into custody.

McClane returns to the LAPD headquarters, where Piet's men have taken over the entire compound. McClane rescues Thornburg, who happens to try to get an exclusive interview with von Laden. Thornburg informs McClane there are two booby trapped bombs planted in the main entrance doors, and should anyone from the outside attempts a rescue, the headquarters will explode. McClane finds Lucy and an injured von Laden, and the latter tells McClane that Piet and Frontier have plans for him and all of Los Angeles. McClane recruits inmates Herbert Dowd and Nitric to hack into the police's communications system and disarm the explosives at the main entrance. Once the explosives are disarmed, Nitric betrays McClane and escapes. While in the hot pursuit of Nitric, McClane obtains a suitcase containing evidence of the art robbery. He confronts Piet, who is holding Captain Al Powell, von Laden, and Thornburg hostage. Lucy appears to aid her father but is taken hostage by Piet's newest henchman, Nitric. Piet kills von Laden and escapes with Frontier and Nitric in the helicopter.

McClane and the LAPD track the helicopter down to a movie studio in Hollywood. After providing cover for the SWAT team using a sniper, he regroups with them, and they recover some of the paintings. McClane ignores their advice to go home and stays to find Lucy. Arriving at a Western-themed set in the studio, McClane and Nitric engage in a shootout, where the former emerges victorious. Al comes and arrests McClane for his unintentional assault on Jessie Montana, a renowned actress whose trailer McClane vandalized while trying to find Lucy.

At the Sierra Correctional Facility, Piet's men stage a jailbreak, and Nitric leaves his cell. Sergio kidnaps the prison warden, opening all the cell doors in the process. McClane leaves his cell and arms himself as he attempts to find Nitric and the prison warden. The prison breakout intensifies, and McClane rescues the prison warden, revealing that Nitric is on the roof waiting for a helicopter. McClane finds Nitric and shoots down the latter. Nitric refuses to tell where Lucy is as he dies. Al arrives and, impressed by McClane's heroics, tells him he can go home.

Following a cryptic tip Nitric gave him before his death, McClane heads to a fish factory near the harbor to find Lucy. Instead, he finds Piet exchanging the paintings for a prototype RDXS Ample with Sumi Kazawa. Marlin, a long-time Piet associate, reveals herself, and they take the rocket to a warehouse in the harbor, where McClane chases it. Being helped out by two factory workers, he sneaks inside a truck to follow the whereabouts of Lucy and the rocket. As this was going on, Thornburg announced Piet would destroy the Los Angeles International Airport with the experimental missile if the city of Los Angeles did not give him $1 billion by the end of the night.

McClane finds himself outside the city in a warehouse where the missile is prepared to be launched, giving him the mission to destroy ten fuel tanks so the missile launch could be averted. Once successful, McClane finds the disabled rocket, only to be confronted by Frontier. Frontier reveals his plan to betray Piet. He then orders Marlin to kill McClane as he leaves to collect the ransom money. After a lengthy gunfight, McClane overcomes Marlin. As she dies, Marlin tells McClane that Piet is taking Lucy to Nakatomi Plaza, the same place where McClane killed Piet's father many years ago.

The LAPD forms a blockade around the plaza just as Al receives a call from McClane. At the same time, Frontier informs him of McClane disabling the rocket. McClane arrives to end the threat once and for all. On the 22nd floor, Piet sets up a trap for McClane, who barely escapes. McClane warns Al to hold off the backup while he rescues Lucy at the top. Fighting his way through Piet's men, McClane finds Lucy at the top floor of the plaza, where she is wearing a vest of explosives triggered to explode if she moves. McClane finds the detonator codes and defuses the explosives, saving his daughter. Lucy takes her father to the roof, where Piet and Frontier are waiting for a helicopter to escape. McClane catches up to the two on the helipad, and as Piet is about to shoot McClane dead, Frontier shoots Piet from behind, fulfilling his promise to betray his boss. Lucy comes and guns down Piet. Frontier leaves, but not before McClane grabs the bottom wheel of the helicopter.

Arriving at the Holmes Observatory for the premiere of Galaxy Thief III, McClane deduces Frontier's plot to kill the entire movie cast as revenge for his fall from grace. Learning from a wounded security officer that there are five bombs hidden in suitcases rigged to destroy the observatory, McClane rushes inside to save the hostages and disarm the bombs. Once successful, McClane and Frontier engage in a final confrontation. McClane defeats Frontier, and Frontier activates a bomb hidden in his gear. McClane escapes in the nick of time as the observatory explodes, killing Frontier.

McClane reunites with Lucy and Al. Robert Barnes, a film developer, offers McClane a starring role in a movie based on the recent events, but McClane punches him and walks off with his daughter, ending the game.

== Development ==
The game was being developed as an original IP titled Muzzle Velocity featuring a story in which player character Jack, a member of the LAPD SWAT team, is battling an out of control crime wave that the LAPD cannot stop it on its own. After the studio partnered with Fox Interactive, the game shifted to an adaptation of the film Speed 2: Cruise Control. The game would have been primarily set on a boat, though a bus level was also conceived as a nod to the original film. This game was then planned to release in January 1999 for Nintendo 64 and Windows, but due to the movie's critical and commercial failure, both companies decided to switch the project once more to the Die Hard franchise, with the N64 scheduled release being dubbed Die Hard 64. Gameplay wise, the game was to utilize many of the mechanics found in Goldeneye 007. By early 2000, the Die Hard project was still unfinished, while the next generation of consoles was preparing to release. The studio decided to move the title to GameCube, cancelling the Windows version in the process, and significantly upgrade the game's proprietary TWED engine so they could push the tech into the next gen hardware, developing the game under its current title. On August 30, 2017, a former development team member released playable prototypes of Die Hard 64, up to its latest build.

== Reception ==
Reception

Aggregate scores
Aggregator	Score		
Aggregator	GameCube	PS2	Xbox
GameRankings	63%	57%	53%
Metacritic	54/100	N/A	N/A

Review scores
Publication	Score		
Publication	GameCube	PS2	Xbox
Electronic Gaming Monthly	4/10	N/A	N/A
Eurogamer	4/10	N/A	N/A
Game Informer	6/10	N/A	N/A
GamePro	2/5	N/A	N/A
GameRevolution	D	N/A	N/A
GameSpot	4.8/10	N/A	N/A
GameSpy	1/5	N/A	N/A
GameZone	7/10	N/A	N/A
IGN	6.3/10	N/A	N/A
Nintendo Power	3.2/5	N/A	N/A
PlayStation Official Magazine – UK	N/A	6/10	N/A
PALGN	N/A	N/A	4.5/10

The GameCube version received "mixed or average" reviews from critics, according to the review aggregator website Metacritic. Fran Mirabella III of IGN said of the same console version: "From the hostage-taking dynamics to the controls, the experience just feels unpolished. It can be fun, but there are a lot of frustrations that come along with it to sour the experience a little".
