= The Simpsons: Virtual Springfield =

1997 video game

- Developer: Digital Evolution
- Publisher: Fox Interactive
- Writers: Michael Viner; Neil Alsip
- Composer: Brian Langsbard
- Series: The Simpsons
- Platforms: Windows, Mac OS
- Release: September 1997
- Genre: Adventure
- Mode: Single-player

The Simpsons: Virtual Springfield is a 1997 adventure video game developed by Digital Evolution, published by Fox Interactive, and distributed by 20th Century Fox Home Entertainment for Windows and Macintosh computers. It is based on the animated television series The Simpsons. The objective of the game is to explore a virtual representation of the fictional town Springfield featured in the show. Throughout the town, there are various character cards that the player collects. It features dialogue performed by the cast members of the series. Critics have given Virtual Springfield mixed reviews. The plot and gameplay have been the target of criticism, while the game has been praised for its humor.

== Gameplay ==
Moe's Tavern, as shown in the game

Virtual Springfield is a first-person adventure game that allows players to explore a 3D simulation of Springfield, the fictional town featured in the animated television series The Simpsons and the home of the Simpson family. Many of the familiar locations from the show are present, including Moe's Tavern, Springfield Elementary School, the Kwik-E-Mart, Krustylu Studios, and the Simpsons' house. Players can interact with Simpsons characters such as Mr. Burns, Principal Skinner and Ned Flanders in the game.

Virtual Springfield has the overall goal of collecting an entire set of character cards throughout Springfield. To fully do so, the player must unlock hidden areas by obtaining secret items. A map of the town is featured that gives instructions to players on where to go so that they can progress through the game. Various minigames can be played at certain locations in the game. These include some video games that have previously been seen on The Simpsons, such as the boxing game Slugfest that Homer and Bart played in the season one episode "Moaning Lisa".

== Development ==
Virtual Springfield was published by Fox Interactive for Windows and Macintosh computers in 1997. It was developed by Digital Evolution.

Cast members of The Simpsons, including Dan Castellaneta, Julie Kavner, Nancy Cartwright, Yeardley Smith, Hank Azaria, Harry Shearer, Pamela Hayden, Russi Taylor, Tress MacNeille, Maggie Roswell, and Phil Hartman, provided their voices for the dialog in the game. Bonita Pietila, who has worked on the show, directed the voice actors.

== Promotion ==
When the designers were working on the 3D-visualizations of Springfield at Fox Interactive for the game, they conceived of the project to construct a real-life replica of the Simpsons' house and gave it away in a contest. This replica was constructed in Henderson, Nevada, in collaboration with Kauffman and Broad, and it has been popular with tourists and YouTubers to visit.

== Reception ==
Reception

Review scores
Publication	Score
About.com	3/5
AllGame	3/5

Critics have given the game mixed reviews. Billboard's Doug Reece called the game ambitious, though feeling its high level of detail can cause it to become "somewhat tedious." Nancy Basile of About.com gave the game a three out of five rating, criticizing the lack of a plot but praising the humor. She wrote that Virtual Springfield "isn't so much a game as an interactive tour of Springfield and The Simpsons characters. Though your task is to collect trading cards around town, it doesn't offer any difficulty in finding them. The game controls make it difficult, however, to pick up the cards and collect them. The real fun of Virtual Springfield is browsing the Kwik-E-Mart, visiting Krustylu Studios or hangin' on Evergreen Terrace with the Simpson family. The entire cast lent their voice to this game, so meeting the characters and hearing their quotes is a lot of laughs."

Mark Kanarick of All Game Guide also gave Virtual Springfield a three out of five rating. He praised the game for its references to the television series, noting that "The inside jokes and story-lines alone make the game worth it for those that are fans. For casual viewers and non-viewers, however, there is not enough here to warrant purchase of The Simpsons: Virtual Springfield." Kanarick further wrote that while exploring Springfield was fun at times, "it is also very tedious. Reading the map can be a problem, especially for younger kids. If you do not utilize the map to its full extent, you will most likely find yourself lost in the town and unsure of where to go next. Although it is a full town, you do at times feel very constricted, as you can only change directions at certain corners. The rest of the time you are just moving where the computer is telling you to."

Joe Toledo of Animation World wrote in his review that "While the software has game-like elements, it is lacking the depth of a true game. The individual objectives to get into each location are very easy to achieve. Once you've been around town a few times, traveling in real time between locations starts to get a bit long. [...] Plus, even though there are 17 great locations to visit, once you've been to them several times, the novelty starts to wear off. [...] Virtual Springfield would have benefited from having a better gaming element incorporated into it, slowly revealing more locations around town and introducing the characters one by one to extend playing time and add an extra layer of depth."
