= Die Hard Trilogy =

1996 video game

- Developer: Probe Entertainment (Note: Additional work on Sega Saturn version by Virtually Unreal Ltd.)
- Publisher: Fox Interactive
- Producers: Michael Arkin; Darren Anderson
- Designers: Dennis Gustafsson; Simon Pick
- Programmer: Simon Pick (Note: Pick was also the programmer for the Die Harder and With a Vengeance portions of the game; Greg Modern programmed the Die Hard portion only.)
- Artist: Dennis Gustafsson
- Composers: Stephen Root; Neil Palmer
- Platforms: PlayStation, Microsoft Windows, Sega Saturn
- Release: PlayStation: NA: September 18, 1996; EU: December 6, 1996; Windows & Sega Saturn: NA: January 21, 1997; EU: February 28, 1997
- Genres: Third-person shooter Light gun shooter Driving
- Mode: Single-player

Die Hard Trilogy is an action video game developed by Probe Entertainment, published by Fox Interactive and distributed by 20th Century Fox Home Entertainment in North America and Electronic Arts in Europe for the PlayStation, Sega Saturn and Microsoft Windows. The game is based on the first three installments of the Die Hard series of action movies, with each film entry being represented through a different gameplay genre.

The game was well received and would eventually become a PlayStation Greatest Hits and PlayStation Platinum game. Die Hard Trilogy also inspired a sequel entitled Die Hard Trilogy 2: Viva Las Vegas. The sequel retained the three different playing styles but featured a spin-off storyline that was not connected to the movie series.

== Gameplay ==
=== Die Hard ===
Die Hard is a third-person shooter. The player battles terrorists and rescues hostages in the Nakatomi Plaza, which is the setting of the first film in the series.

=== Die Hard 2: Die Harder ===
Die Hard 2: Die Harder is presented as an on rails-shooter, where the player must stop terrorists who have taken over Dulles Airport from the second film.

Players control the crosshair with a gamepad, light gun, or mouse. Die Hard Trilogy was one of the few light gun games available for the PlayStation that was not compatible with Namco's GunCon/G-Con 45 controller or GunCon 2. However, it was compatible with Sega's Stunner light gun for the Saturn version.

=== Die Hard with a Vengeance ===
In Die Hard with a Vengeance, the player goes on a joyride driving a taxicab, sports car, and dump truck throughout all of New York City and is tasked with finding and defusing several explosives before they can go off.

== Development ==
The game was developed by a UK-based development studio, Probe Entertainment. The Die Hard with a Vengeance segment was developed first and was intended to be a standalone release, but publisher Fox Interactive insisted that the game should be more closely linked to the films, leading Probe to develop the other two segments. Probe were developing Alien Trilogy at the same time. Since Alien Trilogy was being published by Probe's new owner Acclaim Entertainment, technology and experienced personnel were prioritized towards Alien Trilogy, leaving Die Hard Trilogy to be developed by a small team of young programmers and designers working with Probe's oldest equipment.

Fox Interactive exerted little creative control over the project, allowing the Probe team to be unrestrained and improvisational in their designs. Lead programmer Simon Pick recounted, "There was no real design. We made it up as we went along. We knew the overall feeling we wanted and the various points we wanted to hit gameplay-wise. We had a design document, but it was written after the fact. We’d implement a feature and the designer would write it up to send over to Fox as an update."

The inexperienced team found they had taken on more than they could comfortably handle by promising three games in one, forcing them to make technical compromises as they went along. Initially the Die Hard 2 segment of the game was developed with polygonal enemies, but they were later replaced with digitized sprites. For the Die Hard with a Vengeance segment, the team had wanted to use an authentic recreation of New York City, but found that when driving at 200 miles per hour, an accurate model of NYC felt too small and confining. The larger models could not be built completely in RAM, so the team divided it into sections, designed a system to calculate which section to load next, and fixed the resultant errors by hand.

The PlayStation was chosen as the lead platform because Pick strongly felt that it was the most powerful format of the time. In particular, he reasoned that the Saturn and PC versions would come out better if the programmers were trying to emulate impressive graphical effects on an extant PlayStation version than if they were designing the game around the hardware limitations of the Saturn. In an interview during development, Pick elaborated on how the team intended to optimize the game for Saturn:

At the moment on PlayStation, we've got six or seven circular images which appear to make the lens flare effect, but maybe we'll just have two or three on Saturn version to keep the frame rate up. ... Frame rate is the main thing. We've got one guy coming over to us from Sega who's very clever. He's written a program which basically takes a polygonal model, and as it's rendering it looks at the size of the polygons; if they're very small it says "there's no point texturing this, let's do it flat in just one color," and this way it saves processor time and helps keep the frame rate up. We're going to reduce the detail of the models quite a lot, and reduce the texturing so the roads on Saturn will probably be flat shaded - so it's like a gray road rather than having textures.

== Reception ==
Reception

Review scores
Publication	Score
AllGame	4/5 (PS1); 2/5 (PC)
Electronic Gaming Monthly	8.75/10 (PS1)
GameSpot	9.4/10 (PS1); 5.0/10 (SAT)
IGN	7.5/10 (PS1)
Next Generation	4/5 (PS1)
PlayStation Magazine	8/10 (PS1)
Sega Saturn Magazine	91% (SAT)

Die Hard Trilogy was a commercial hit, with sales above 2 million units by 2000. It became Probe's most successful release in terms of sales in the UK.

The PlayStation version was positively reviewed. As of June 2017, it holds an 86% ranking at GameRankings. Most critics considered the high value-for-money of getting three games in one to be Die Hard Trilogy's strongest point. A few even stated that none of the three component games were good enough to stand on their own, but the variety offered by the collection as a whole makes it exceptionally entertaining. However, the majority commented that all three component games are outstanding even on their own terms. GamePro presented a dissenting opinion; while they highly praised the game's addictive quality and sound effects, they argued that the three segments are ultimately just rehashes of (respectively) Resident Evil, Virtua Cop, and Twisted Metal. The most common criticism was that the Die Harder segment requires the Konami light gun to be enjoyable, since the cursor when using the standard controller is slow and difficult to move. The first segment of the game was particularly praised for its deep challenge, requiring players to out-think the enemy.

Die Hard Trilogy was a finalist for the Computer Game Developers Conference's 1996 "Best Adaptation of Linear Media" Spotlight Award, but lost the prize to I Have No Mouth, and I Must Scream. However, Electronic Gaming Monthly editors named it Action Game of the Year.

The Saturn port also received mostly positive reviews, though it was often compared unfavorably to the PlayStation original. GamePro said the graphics are not as sharp as the PlayStation version's, especially in the Die Harder segment, but the gameplay is addictive enough to make this relatively unimportant. Josh Smith stated in GameSpot that the sluggish controls and poor graphics, especially as compared to the PlayStation version, make the first two segments of the game nearly unplayable, since lining up shots in time is awkward and frustrating. However, he said that in the third segment the animation is actually better than the PlayStation version's, and that the fast pace and black humor of this segment make it worth buying Die Hard Trilogy all by itself. Paul Glancey of Sega Saturn Magazine summarized, "Often when you see compilations like this there's ... one section that stands out as the one that the programmers thought of first and lavished the most attention on, but all three sections of Die Hard Trilogy have their fair share of thrills, great visuals and clever ideas."

In Germany, the game was banned because of its extreme violence, especially being able to drive through harmless people with blood spilling all over the windshield.

== See also ==
- Alien Trilogy
