= The Simpsons: Cartoon Studio =

1996 video game

The Simpsons Cartoon Studio
- Developer: Big Top Productions
- Publisher: Fox Interactive
- Producer: Rob Pratt
- Programmer: Carl Higashionna
- Composers: Alf Clausen; Jeff Essex
- Series: The Simpsons
- Platforms: Windows, Mac OS
- Release: July 1996
- Genre: Filmmaking

The Simpsons: Cartoon Studio is a filmmaking game based on the animated television series The Simpsons that was released for Windows and Mac computers in 1996 by Fox Interactive. It allows users to create their own Simpsons cartoons, using characters, sounds, music, and locations from the show. The cast members of The Simpsons provided their voices for the program. The Simpsons Cartoon Studio has received mixed reviews.

== Gameplay ==
The Simpsons Cartoon Studio is a design program for creating cartoons using characters, sounds, music, and locations from the American animated television series The Simpsons. To create a cartoon, one first selects a background, then inserts characters, props, and special effects, and after that adds dialog, sound effects, and music. The program allows users to send the finished cartoons to friends through email or save it onto a hard drive or a floppy disk.

Example of a cartoon made on the game, involving Bart being chased by Marge, Homer and Principal Skinner while Ralph cries.

There are 17 characters, 50 special effects, 270 props, and 35 backgrounds in The Simpsons Cartoon Studio, with thousands of individual cels hand-drawn by actual The Simpsons cartoonists. Every character has a set of actions; for example, Homer can crawl, ride on a tube, and run away screaming, while Bart can run, trip over, cycle, ride his skateboard, and paint graffiti with spray-paint. Backgrounds featured range from the Springfield Nuclear Power Plant to Bart's room, and props include tables, blenders, and the three-eyed fish Blinky.

== Development ==
The Simpsons Cartoon Studio was released for PC and Mac computers in the middle of 1996. It was developed by Big Top Productions and published by Fox Interactive, and uses an improved version of the interface from Felix the Cat's Cartoon Toolbox that was developed by Big Top Productions. The dialogs featured in the game were provided by the actual cast members of The Simpsons.

== Reception ==
Critics gave The Simpsons Cartoon Studio mixed reviews. A reviewer for The Palm Beach Post wrote that it is not very easy to create the cartoons: "Layering characters, props, sound effects and dialogue into seamless animation is no small task, and you'll invest a good chunk of time with this CD-ROM before you're ready to premiere your own Simpsons episodes. But if you're fan enough to go the distance, this is a remarkably versatile program that turns out great-looking cartoons." Similarly, Jane Clifford of The San Diego Union-Tribune called it "quite a challenging product" which produces cartoons that "really look professional." Benjamin Svetkey of Entertainment Weekly gave it a B+ rating, commenting that the cartoons created "can be entertaining, but they're hampered by a failing common to the make-your-own-movie genre: Since Cartoon Studio has a limited number of voice clips ('Ay, caramba!', 'Mmm... donuts', and about 50 variations on 'Bart!'), your plot choices are restricted to the usual pranks, pratfalls, and catchphrases. Still, as Homer would say, The Simpsons Cartoon Studio is more 'Woohoo!' than 'D'oh!'."

Wired's Erika Milvy commented that "Fox's Simpsons Cartoon Studio may be more the '90s answer to Colorforms than a finely tuned animation resource, but dang if it isn't fun to watch Smithers and Mr. Burns hula across the monitor as a three-eyed fish swims by," and added that "for the anally inclined, there's certainly a way to have these cartoons make more sense. But I prefer to toss rhyme and reason out the window." Joseph Szadkowski of The Washington Times wrote that "For the amount of complicated computer stuff going on — frame by frame editing, character motion, voice overlays — even the most computer-illiterate individual should be able to figure this out. The Simpsons Cartoon Studio is a very fun, relatively inexpensive jaunt into the mind of Mr. Groening."

Mike Langberg of Knight Ridder was less positive, writing in his review that "At first glance, the CD-ROM provides a lot of raw material. There are 350 brief animations, running two or three seconds each, showing 17 characters from the show in numerous poses. The CD-ROM delivery, unfortunately, falls flat[...]." He explained that "Simpsons Cartoon Studio is awkward to operate and limited in what it can accomplish, producing animated sequences that are jerky and out of sync. The CD-ROM comes with 15 cartoons created by the developers, running from 10 seconds to 55 seconds. None flow smoothly or tell funny stories. There's no reason to expect the rest of us will do any better." Similarly, Nancy Malitz of The Detroit News wrote that "you move the characters around and invent the scenarios, but in the end you might feel your creativity wasn't heavily challenged. The whole deal is essentially a cut-and-paste operation. You can't create characters of your own, and the kind of automatic synchronization of sounds with movement that you see in a simple product like Video Jam isn't available, so things look sort of choppy no matter how hard you try."
