= The Simpsons: Road Rage =

Vehicular combat video game

- North American PlayStation 2 cover art
- Developer: Radical Entertainment
- Publishers: Electronic Arts; Fox Interactive
- Producers: John Melchior; Cam Weber; Matt McKnight
- Designer: Carey Du Gray
- Programmers: Joel DeYoung; Darren Esau
- Artists: Yayoi Maruno; Glen Schulz
- Writers: Tim Long; Matt Selman
- Composer: Christopher Tyng
- Series: The Simpsons
- Platforms: PlayStation 2; Xbox; GameCube
- Release: November 19, 2001: PlayStation 2; NA: November 19, 2001; EU: November 30, 2001 Xbox; NA: December 1, 2001; EU: March 22, 2002 GameCube; NA: December 19, 2001; EU: May 10, 2002
- Genre: Racing
- Modes: Single-player, multiplayer

The Simpsons: Road Rage is a 2001 racing video game developed by Radical Entertainment and co-published by Electronic Arts and Fox Interactive for PlayStation 2, Xbox, and GameCube. Based on the animated television series The Simpsons, the game stars Homer, Marge, Bart, and Lisa, as well as Mr. Burns and several other characters from the show.

The Simpsons: Road Rage is similar to Sega's 1999 video game Crazy Taxi, in that the main objective is to pick up and drive passengers to their destinations as quickly as possible. These similarities led to Sega suing developer Radical Entertainment, Electronic Arts, and Fox Interactive for patent infringement, though it was settled before going to court.

The game was met with mixed reviews from critics, many of whom pointed out its bare-bones Crazy Taxi mimicry and poor graphics. A spiritual successor, The Simpsons: Hit & Run, also developed by Radical Entertainment, was released in 2003.

== Gameplay and plot ==
In the game, Mr. Burns has bought all transit systems in Springfield and has created radioactive buses that threaten the public health. Because of this, the citizens of Springfield must use their own vehicles as a means of safer public transport. Their goal is to earn money in an attempt to pay back Burns, get rid of his radioactive buses, and return the town to normal.

The main form of gameplay, titled "Road Rage", is an arcade-style taxi game where the player chooses a character from The Simpsons and earns money by picking up passengers and taking them to their destinations within the shortest possible time. The quicker the player is able to drop off passengers, the higher their ratings and the more time they get to drive. Regardless of how the player performs, passenger ratings deteriorate and time will eventually run out, ending the session. After each session, if the player has earned enough money, they can choose to purchase one of twelve new Simpsons character drivers along with their own vehicle, or one of five new starting locations.

While playing, players have to avoid certain hurdles, such as other vehicles, Burns' nuclear transit buses, or Burns himself, who occasionally rams his limo into the player's vehicle. Each character, depending on if they are familiar with their passenger in the series, will often share a comedic or referential exchange. When the player unlocks all locations, characters, and earns one million dollars in earnings, they effectively cease Mr. Burns' transit system and are shown a special cutscene.

The other form of gameplay, titled "Missions", are ten consecutive missions set within the game's five locations, where the player is assigned a character and tasked with a vehicular objective. In order to complete missions, they must complete them within a limited span of time (such as protecting Krusty the Clown from a fan mob by driving him away, getting Homer to his workplace unnoticed, or mowing over mascots as a drunk Barney). When all missions are completed, the player is awarded with the vehicle "Homer's Own Car" to select in "Road Rage", in reference to the vehicle designed by Homer in the 1991 episode, "Oh Brother, Where Art Thou?".

There is also a multiplayer mode in which the two players compete to pick up the same passengers and drive them to their destinations.

Depending on which date the player's console is set on, the player will be able to choose a character with holiday-oriented vehicle, such as "Christmas Apu" or "New Years Krusty", among others.

== Development and release ==
The Simpsons: Road Rage was developed by Radical Entertainment and published by Electronic Arts (EA) and Fox Interactive, with a development time of 12 months. The PlayStation 2 version was released first, on November 19, 2001, in North America, and the Xbox and GameCube versions followed in December of that year. The cast members of The Simpsons reprised their roles for the game. Voice samples original to the game, as well as one-liners from the show, can be heard in Road Rage.

== Reception ==
Reception

Aggregate score
Aggregator	Score		
Aggregator	GameCube	PS2	Xbox
Metacritic	67/100	64/100	61/100

Review scores
Publication	Score		
Publication	GameCube	PS2	Xbox
AllGame	N/A	N/A	2.5/5
Electronic Gaming Monthly	4/10	N/A	4/10, 4/10, 3/10
Eurogamer	N/A	N/A	7/10
Game Informer	8/10	8/10	8/10
GamePro	N/A	2.5/5	N/A
GameRevolution	N/A	C+	N/A
GameSpot	6.2/10	6.2/10	6.2/10
GameSpy	67%	39%	N/A
GameZone	N/A	7/10	6/10
IGN	5.8/10	5.1/10	6.4/10
Next Generation	N/A	N/A	2/5
Nintendo Power	4.6/5	N/A	N/A
Official U.S. PlayStation Magazine	N/A	3/5	N/A
Official Xbox Magazine (US)	N/A	N/A	6.2/10
FHM	N/A	3/5	N/A
Maxim	N/A	8/10	N/A

The Simpsons: Road Rage received "mixed or average reviews" on all platforms, according to the review aggregation website Metacritic.

Amer Ajami of GameSpot said that the PlayStation 2 version "suffers from a number of problems, not the least of which is bad collision detection. You'll often find yourself clipping a corner of a building or slamming into another car even though you have room to spare." Ajami was also disappointed with the extremely slippery and overly sensitive control. Ajami added, however, that fans of the show should enjoy the game.

IGN's David Zdyrko said of the same console version that "the gameplay just isn't deep or compelling enough to warrant picking this title up unless you absolutely MUST have every single product with The Simpsons plastered on it." Zdyrko also criticized the graphics, stating that the "framerate chugs in some of the levels when there are a lot of cars on screen and the textures are generally low resolution and completely bland." Zdyrko also said the "hilarious voice samples" were the "lone bright spot" of the game, although he admitted that some of them can get a bit repetitive.

NextGen said of the Xbox version, "It's strange. Crazy Taxi is great, and The Simpsons is great, so the two together should be gaming magic, right? Yet the result is less than the sum of its parts. In the end, Road Rage is significant only as the most shameless incident of design burglary in recent memory."

By July 2006, the PlayStation 2 version had sold 1.6 million copies and earned $41 million in the U.S. NextGen ranked it as the 25th highest-selling game launched for the PlayStation 2, Xbox, or GameCube between January 2000 and July 2006 in that country. Combined sales of Simpsons console games released in the 2000s reached 5.2 million units in the United States by July 2006. The same console version also received a "Platinum" sales award from the Entertainment and Leisure Software Publishers Association (ELSPA), indicating sales of at least 300,000 copies in the U.K. The game has a total of at least 3 million copies sold.

== Lawsuit ==
During 2003, Sega, creator and owner of the Crazy Taxi franchise, filed a lawsuit against Fox Interactive, Electronic Arts, and Radical Entertainment, claiming that Road Rage was a patent infringement of the former as both games feature nearly identical gameplay and objectives with the Crazy Taxi game engine. According to IGN, "Road Rage features similar game play, to the point where some reviews commented negatively on the parallels." The case, Sega of America, Inc. v. Fox Interactive, et al., was settled in private mediation for an undisclosed amount.
