= Christopher Tyng =

American composer

- Born: August 5, 1968 (age 57)
- Origin: Long Beach, California, United States
- Genres: Television score
- Occupation: Television composer
- Website: christophertyng.com

Christopher Tyng (born August 5, 1968) is an American composer for film and television. He composed the music for several television series, including Futurama, The O.C., The Job, Knight Rider, Suits, High Incident, and Rescue Me. He also composed the CGI-animated holiday special Olive, the Other Reindeer.

The main theme for Futurama samples Pierre Henry's "Psyche Rock", The Winstons' "Amen Brother" and Sugarhill Gang's "Rapper's Delight".

As was noted in the audio commentary of the Futurama episode "The Problem with Popplers", Tyng is first and foremost a drummer; indeed, he accredits his composing proficiency to the awkwardness of lugging a drum set. As a convenience to him, his bandmates would often bring their instruments to his house for practice. Tyng, then, had access to many more instruments, which he then learned to play.
