= NHL Powerplay 98 =

1997 sports video game

NHL Powerplay 98 NHL All-Star Hockey 98
- Developer: Radical Entertainment
- Publishers: Virgin Interactive; Sega (Saturn)
- Composer: Graig Robertson
- Platforms: Microsoft Windows, PlayStation, Sega Saturn
- Release: Windows, PlayStation: NA: October 9, 1997; EU: May 1998 (PS); Sega Saturn: NA: November 24, 1997; EU: January 1998
- Genre: Sports
- Modes: Single player, multiplayer

NHL Powerplay 98 is a sports video game developed by Radical Entertainment and published by Virgin Interactive and Sega for Microsoft Windows, PlayStation, and Sega Saturn in 1997. It is the sequel to NHL Powerplay '96; there was no "'97" entry in the NHL Powerplay series. After Virgin opted not to release the game for the Sega Saturn, Sega acquired the rights and published the Saturn version under the title NHL All-Star Hockey 98 so as to make it a continuation of Sega's own NHL All-Star Hockey series.

== Development ==
The game was showcased at E3 1997. Motion capture was used to create the player animations.

== Reception ==
Reception

Aggregate score
Aggregator	Score		
Aggregator	PC	PS	Saturn
GameRankings	71%	69%	N/A

Review scores
Publication	Score		
Publication	PC	PS	Saturn
AllGame	N/A	3.5/5	N/A
Computer Games Strategy Plus	3/5	N/A	N/A
Computer Gaming World	4/5	N/A	N/A
Electronic Gaming Monthly	N/A	6.75/10 (Note: Two critics of Electronic Gaming Monthly gave the PlayStation version each a score of 7/10 and 6.5/10.)	4.625/10 (Note: Four critics of Electronic Gaming Monthly gave the Saturn version each a score of 5/10, 5.5/10, 3.5/10, and 4.5/10.)
Game Informer	N/A	8/10	N/A
GameFan	N/A	75% (Note: In GameFan's early viewpoint of the PlayStation version, one critic gave it 70, and another 80.)	82% (Note: In GameFan's early viewpoint of the Saturn version, one critic gave it 81, and another 83.)
GameRevolution	C+	N/A	N/A
GameSpot	7.3/10	5.1/10	6.8/10
IGN	N/A	7/10	N/A
PC Gamer (US)	62%	N/A	N/A
PlayStation: The Official Magazine	N/A	3.5/5	N/A
Sega Saturn Magazine	N/A	N/A	85%

NHL Powerplay 98 received a variety of reviews, with critics expressing differing opinions on a number of points. For example, while IGN, GamePro, Sega Saturn Magazine, and John Ricciardi of Electronic Gaming Monthly (EGM) all praised the player animations for their fluid movements and variety of realistic moves, Kraig Kujawa and Dean Hager (also of EGM), as well as Ryan MacDonald of GameSpot, complained that the animations are too choppy. Likewise, while Dan Hsu of EGM and MacDonald both considered the graphics to be bottom tier, Kujawa, Hager, IGN, GamePro, Sega Saturn Magazine, and Glenn Rubenstein all found them exceptionally good, especially the player models.

Reviewers widely complimented the player A.I., while the most strongly emphasized criticism of the game was the slow play speed. EGM were particularly vehement about this in their review of the Saturn version, characterizing it as a fatal flaw in an otherwise well-made game; Ricciardi said that "it almost seems like the game is running in some sort of slow motion." McDonald (reviewing the PlayStation version) and GamePro (reviewing the Saturn version) instead argued that the game fails to excel in any category and, while an overall solid outing, would not compete well against upcoming hockey games such as NHL 98. (Note: GamePro gave the PlayStation version 3.5/5 for graphics, and 4/5 for sound, control, and fun factor.) However, GamePro's review of the PlayStation version gave it a positive recommendation, saying it "brings a fast and fluid game to the rink with nice graphics, solid control, and authentic sounds", even though the reviews were both written by the same critic and did not note any differences between the two versions. (Note: GamePro gave the Saturn version 3.5/5 scores for graphics and fun factor, 3/5 for sound, and 4/5 for control.)

Rubenstein (reviewing the Saturn version) also gave the game a positive assessment, though a more reserved one: "If you like the sport, you'll enjoy this game; the 3D graphics are smooth (although there is a noticeable slowdown at times), the play control is solid, and the laundry list of features adds to the realism." Sega Saturn Magazine was also uncertain, saying that the updates from NHL Powerplay 97 are minor, and that while it was still the top hockey game in both graphics and gameplay, it could potentially be outdone by NHL 98. IGN's recommendation was still more tentative: "The link between polygons and gameplay has yet to be made, but NHL Powerplay '98 makes a nice attempt. If you really want a hockey game for your PlayStation, this one is probably your best bet for now."

The PC version held a 71% on the review aggregation website GameRankings based on four reviews, and the PlayStation version held a 69% based on five reviews.
