= Brett Hull =

Canadian-American ice hockey player (born 1964)

- Hockey Hall of Fame, 2009
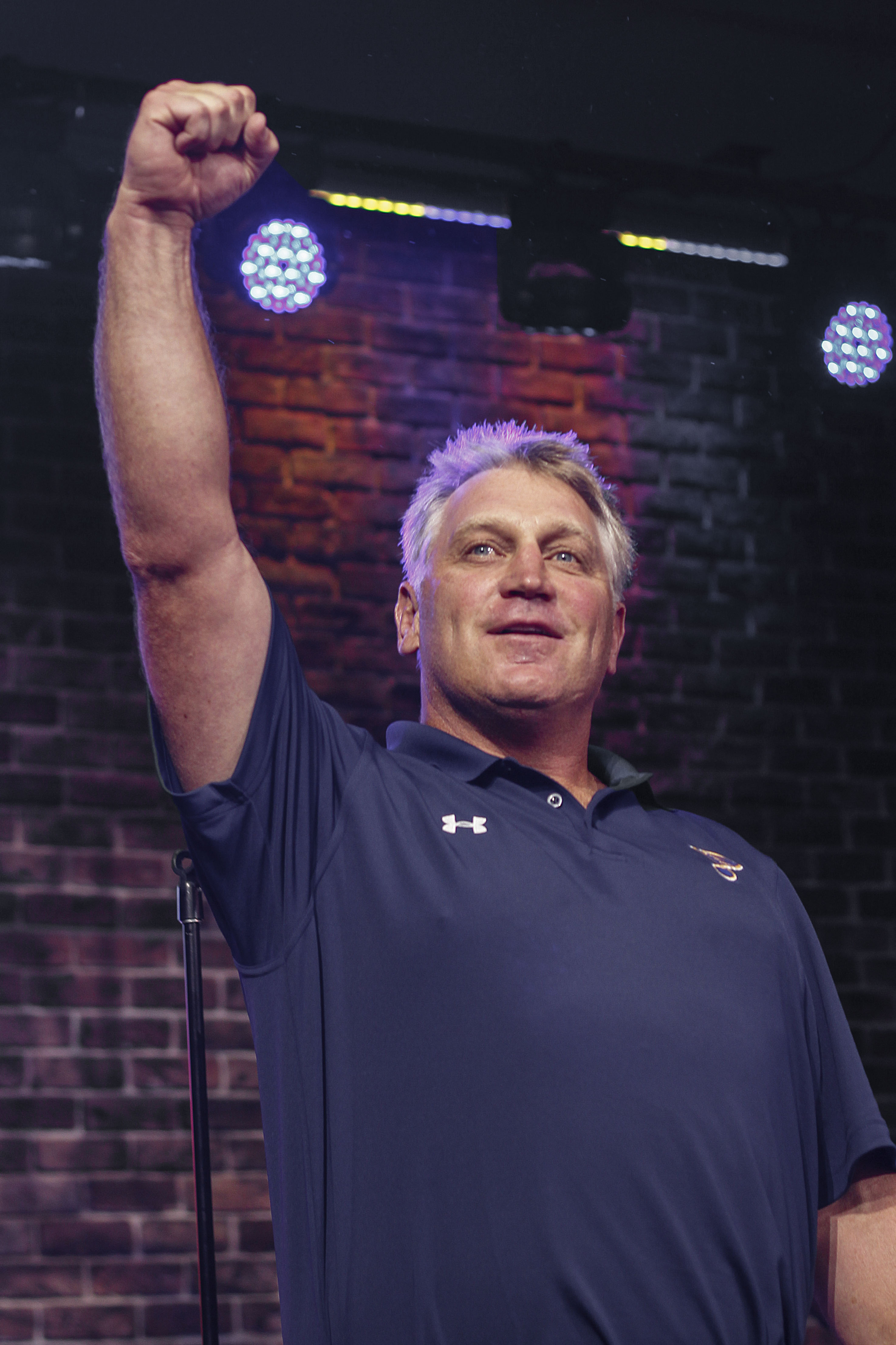
- Hull in 2014
- Born: August 9, 1964 (age 62) Belleville, Ontario, Canada
- Height: 5 ft 11 in (180 cm)
- Weight: 200 lb (91 kg; 14 st 4 lb)
- Position: Right wing
- Shot: Right
- Played for: Calgary Flames; St. Louis Blues; Dallas Stars; Detroit Red Wings; Phoenix Coyotes
- National team: United States
- NHL draft: 117th overall, 1984; Calgary Flames
- Playing career: 1986–2005
Medal record
Men's ice hockey
Representing the United States
Olympic Games
Silver medal – second place	2002 Salt Lake City
World Cup of Hockey
Gold medal – first place	1996 United States
Canada Cup
Silver medal – second place	1991 United States

Brett Andrew Hull (born August 9, 1964) is a Canadian–American former ice hockey player and general manager, and currently an executive vice president of the St. Louis Blues of the National Hockey League (NHL). He played for the Calgary Flames, St. Louis Blues, Dallas Stars, Detroit Red Wings, and Phoenix Coyotes between 1986 and 2005. His career total of 741 goals is fifth highest in NHL history, and he is one of five players to score 50 goals in 50 games. He was a member of two Stanley Cup winning teams — 1999 with the Dallas Stars and 2002 with the Detroit Red Wings. In 2017, Hull was named one of the 100 Greatest NHL Players in history.

Known as one of the game's greatest snipers, Hull was an elite scorer at all levels of the game. He played college hockey for the University of Minnesota-Duluth Bulldogs, where he scored 52 goals in 1985–86. He scored 50 the following year with the Moncton Golden Flames of the American Hockey League (AHL) and had five consecutive NHL seasons of at least 50 goals. His 86 goals in 1990–91 is the third-highest single-season total in NHL history, with the first two being the same person, Wayne Gretzky. Hull won the Hart Memorial Trophy and Lester B. Pearson Award that year as the league's most valuable player. He was named a first team all-star on three occasions and played in eight NHL All-Star Games.

Having dual citizenship in Canada and the United States, (after being cut from Team Canada) Hull was eligible to play for the United States internationally and chose to join the American National Team. He was a member of the team that won the 1996 World Cup of Hockey and was a two-time Olympian, winning a silver medal at the 2002 Winter Olympics. Hull was inducted into the Hockey Hall of Fame in 2009, joining his father Bobby Hull. They are the first father-son combination to each score either of 600 goals or 1,000 career points in the NHL. Hull's nickname, "the Golden Brett" is a reference to his father's nickname of "the Golden Jet". His jersey number 16 was retired by the St. Louis Blues in 2006.

== Early life ==
Hull was born August 9, 1964, in Belleville, Ontario, Canada. His father, Bobby, was a long-time professional hockey player in both the National Hockey League (NHL) and World Hockey Association (WHA). His mother, Joanne (McKay), was an American professional figure skater and taught him how to skate. He has three brothers, Bobby Jr., Blake, and Bart, and a younger sister, Michelle. Bart played professional football in the Canadian Football League (CFL). His uncle Dennis was also a longtime NHL player.

As his father played for the NHL's Chicago Black Hawks, Hull spent his early life in Illinois, and he first played organized hockey in the Chicago area at age four. He and his brothers often skated with the Black Hawks where they watched their father play. The family moved back to Canada when Bobby signed with the original Winnipeg Jets, then in the WHA, in 1972. As a youth, Hull and teammate Richard Kromm played in the 1977 Quebec International Pee-Wee Hockey Tournament with the Winnipeg South Monarchs minor ice hockey team. He moved to Vancouver with his mother and two youngest siblings shortly before his parents' acrimonious divorce in 1979. Hull was not close to his father following the breakup, though the two spoke periodically.

== Playing career ==
=== Junior and college ===
Admitting that he was viewed as a "pudgy, fun-loving, music-crazed bum" in his youth, Hull stated in his autobiography that he was not surprised when he failed to attract the attention of a junior team. He was first eligible for the NHL entry draft in 1982, but as he was still playing in a juvenile league, was passed over without interest. He joined the Penticton Knights of the tier-II British Columbia Junior Hockey League (BCJHL) in the 1982–83 season where he scored 48 goals in 50 games. He was again passed over at the 1983 Entry Draft as teams remained unconvinced of his commitment to the game and his conditioning. NHL teams finally took notice of Hull following his 1983–84 season in which he scored 105 goals in 56 games and broke the BCJHL scoring record with 188 points. The Calgary Flames selected him in the sixth round of the 1984 NHL entry draft, 117th overall.

Hull accepted a scholarship to play for the University of Minnesota-Duluth (UMD), and in 1984–85, scored 32 goals as a freshman. The power of his shot terrorized goaltenders. He was awarded the Jerry Chumola Award as the school's rookie of the year and received similar honors from the Western Collegiate Hockey Association (WCHA). His coaches at Minnesota-Duluth impressed on Hull the need to improve his skating, and in 1985–86, he broke the school record of 49 goals in one season, reaching 52 that year. Hull was named the WCHA first-team all-star at right wing and was a finalist for the Hobey Baker Award as the top player in the National Collegiate Athletic Association (NCAA).

In his two seasons at UMD, Hull set numerous school scoring records. He holds the records for most goals by a rookie (32) and most goals in one season (52). His 20 power play goals, seven hat tricks, and 13 multiple-goal games in 1985–86 are all records, and he shares the school's single-game playoff record of four goals. The school retired his jersey number 29 in 2006.

=== Calgary Flames (1986–1988) ===
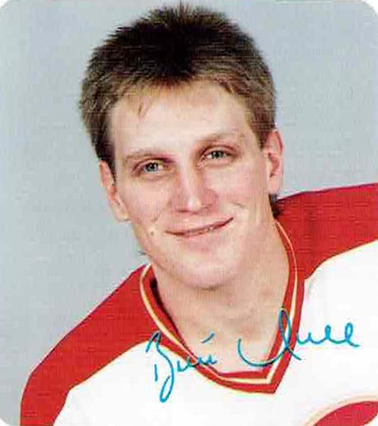
1987 card of Hull for Calgary Flames

Choosing to turn professional following his sophomore season, Hull signed a contract with the Calgary Flames and joined the team during the 1986 Stanley Cup Playoffs. He made his NHL debut on May 20, 1986, in game three of the Stanley Cup Final against the Montreal Canadiens. His best scoring opportunity came when he hit the post in his first shift of the game. He appeared in two games of the Flames' five-game series loss to Montreal.

The Flames assigned Hull to their American Hockey League (AHL) affiliate, the Moncton Golden Flames, for the majority of the 1986–87 season. He scored 50 goals, tying an AHL rookie record, and his 93 points was third-best in the league. He won the Dudley "Red" Garrett Memorial Award as the league's Rookie of the Year and was named to the First All-Star Team, earning a brief recall to Calgary during the season. He made his regular-season debut on November 13, 1986, against the Hartford Whalers and scored his first NHL goal against Steve Weeks on a breakaway. It was the game-winning goal in a 4–3 victory. Hull appeared in five regular-season games for the Flames and played in four playoff games, where he scored two goals and added an assist.

Hull earned a spot on the Flames for the 1987–88 season, though the team continued to work with him on his conditioning. He appeared in 52 games for the Flames, scoring 26 goals and 50 points. He did not finish the season in Calgary, however. On March 7, 1988, Hull was traded with Steve Bozek to the St. Louis Blues for defenseman Rob Ramage and goaltender Rick Wamsley.

=== St. Louis Blues (1988–1998) ===
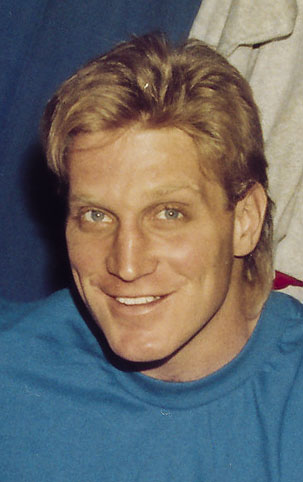
Hull during his time with the Blues in 1993

"The year he scored 86, it was just magical. It was one of those years, wherever we went Brett would score two goals or a hat trick. It was just fantastic. I can't believe we only played together 2½ years because it felt like 10. It was just so special. We just really hit it off as buddies, friends. We played the game the same way; the chemistry was just excellent."

— Adam Oates discusses his time with Brett Hull in St. Louis.

Hull led St. Louis with 41 goals in 1988–89, but his poor skating and inattention to his defensive responsibilities concerned the club. Head coach Brian Sutter convinced Hull to improve his conditioning over the summer. He arrived to begin the 1989–90 season in much better shape and showed a marked improvement in his skating. Center Adam Oates, acquired over the summer, joined Hull on the top line. The pair, dubbed "Hull and Oates" as a play on the band Hall and Oates, were prolific scorers with Oates being an excellent passer and Hull being an excellent shooter. Hull scored 228 goals between 1989–90 and 1991–92, the second-highest three-season total of any player in NHL history, behind only Wayne Gretzky's 250 tallies between 1981–82 and 1983–84. He became the fifth player in NHL history to score 50 goals in 50 games in 1990–91,—joining Maurice Richard, Mike Bossy, Gretzky, and Mario Lemieux—then repeated the feat in 1991–92.

He led the league in goal scoring all three seasons and was named to the first All-Star team each year. He collected numerous league awards, winning the Lady Byng Memorial Trophy in 1990 as the league's most sportsmanlike player, then in 1991, won the Hart Memorial Trophy and Lester B. Pearson Award as the NHL's most valuable player as selected by the league and his fellow players respectively. His total of 86 goals in the 1990–91 season is the third highest for a single season in NHL history, after Gretzky's 92 goals in 1981–82 and 87 in 1983–84. He recorded a goal in 56 games, the most for a season in NHL history.

Oates left the Blues midway through the 1991–92 season, and while Hull's offensive production dropped, he remained the Blues' top offensive threat. He recorded his fourth and fifth consecutive 50-goal seasons, scoring 54 in 1992–93 and 57 in 1993–94.

Hull clashed with head coach Mike Keenan, who joined the team in 1994–95, primarily over the latter's changes to team personnel. Hull, who had been named team captain in 1992, was stripped of the captaincy. By early 1996, the two were publicly criticizing each other in the media. Forced to choose between the player and coach, the Blues fired Keenan on December 19, 1996. Hull responded three nights later with a hat trick against the Los Angeles Kings to reach 500 goals for his NHL career. He and Bobby are the only father-son pair who both reached that total.

After 43- and 42-goal seasons in 1995–96 and 1996–97, Hull scored 27 in 1997–98. He became an unrestricted free agent following the season after rejecting a three-year, $15 million offer from the Blues because the team refused to include a no-trade clause. He left St. Louis, signing a three-year, $17 million contract with the Dallas Stars on July 2, 1998.

=== Dallas Stars (1998–2001) ===
Hull reached 1,000 points in his career when he notched a goal and an assist in a 3–1 victory with the Dallas Stars over the Boston Bruins on November 14, 1998. He then scored his 600th goal on December 31, 1999, in a 5–4 victory over the Mighty Ducks of Anaheim. He scored 32 goals in 1998–99 despite struggling with a groin injury for much of the season. The Stars reached the 1999 Stanley Cup Final, against the Buffalo Sabres. The sixth game of the series went to overtime tied 1–1 while Dallas held a 3–2 series lead. At 14:51 of the third overtime period, Hull collected a rebound in front of the Buffalo net and put the puck past goaltender Dominik Hašek to win the game, and the Stanley Cup, for Dallas.

"We all knew that they had changed the rule. But obviously the NHL decided they weren't going to tell anybody but the teams ... They changed the rule to say if you have control in the crease, you can score the goal, and that's exactly what it was."

— Hull argues the legality of his 1999 Stanley Cup winning goal

The Sabres immediately protested the goal, as NHL rules of the time stated that a player could not score a goal if any part of his body was within the goal crease. Replays showed that Hull's skate was within the crease when he scored, however, the NHL ruled that he had possession of the puck prior to entering the crease, making the goal legal. League officials stated that that very scenario was addressed in a memo sent to the league's on-ice officials prior to the start of the playoffs. Hull himself states the goal was legal, supporting the claim that the NHL had altered the rules in a private memo sent to all teams but not released to the public. Media, fans and players across the league remain divided on the goal, some claiming that the league altered the rule after the fact. It remains especially controversial in Buffalo, where fans and former players continue to maintain that the play should have been ruled "no goal". The NHL formally abolished the crease rule prior to the next season, allowing players to score from within the crease freely as long as they did not interfere with the goaltender.

As a member of the Stars in their Stanley Cup winning season, Hull wore number 22, as his customary number 16 was worn by Pat Verbeek. Hull switched back to number 16 the following season after Verbeek left the team as a free agent. Though he appeared in 79 games in 1999–2000, Hull had what coach Ken Hitchcock called "a disappointing season", struggling defensively and scoring only 24 goals. His offensive production improved in the 2000 Stanley Cup Playoffs as he led the league in post-season scoring with 10 goals and 23 points. The Stars again reached the finals, but lost the series in six games to the New Jersey Devils. Hull scored 39 goals in 2000–01, his best total in four years. He surpassed his father's career total when he scored his 611th goal in a 3–1 victory over the Toronto Maple Leafs on October 10, 2000. Hull played his 1,000th career game on February 25, 2001, in Calgary.

=== Detroit Red Wings (2001–2004) ===
The Stars did not exercise their option on Hull's contract that would have paid him $7 million for the 2001–02 NHL season, making him a free agent. Although he received superior financial offers from the Montreal Canadiens and New York Rangers, Hull signed a two-year, $9 million contract with the Detroit Red Wings to pursue a second Stanley Cup championship. He joined an already star-studded team that earlier that offseason had acquired goaltender Dominik Hasek and winger Luc Robitaille.

As a member of the Red Wings, Hull switched to sweater number 17 out of respect for Vladimir Konstantinov, who wore number 16 for the Red Wings before his playing career ended due to a limousine accident a week after Detroit's 1997 Stanley Cup championship. No player has worn the number 16 for the Red Wings since Konstantinov.

Hull subsequently scored 30 goals that season as the Red Wings dominated their opponents, earning the Presidents' Trophy as the NHL's top team. During the regular season, he was put on a line with Boyd Devereaux and rookie Pavel Datsyuk, a combination in which Hull himself referred to as "two kids and an old goat".

Hull would then score a league-leading 10 in the 2002 Stanley Cup playoffs, as the Red Wings defeated the Vancouver Canucks, his former team the St. Louis Blues, and the rival Colorado Avalanche en route to their fourth Final appearance in eight years. He had a hat trick in the deciding sixth game in the opening round against Vancouver, while adding two goals in the second round against the Blues. He then scored three goals in the Western Conference finals against the Avalanche, including one in Detroit's 7–0 rout of Colorado in the decisive game seven.

He scored key goals in Detroit's game three and four victories against the Carolina Hurricanes in the Stanley Cup Final; the latter was the 100th playoff goal of his career. Hull won his second career championship as the Red Wings won the series in five games.

Hull posted a 37-goal, 76-point campaign in 2002–03. He became the sixth player in NHL history to score 700 career goals on February 10, 2003, against the San Jose Sharks. At age 38, Hull signed a one-year, $5 million extension with the Red Wings. After scoring 25 goals in 2003–04, Hull would score three goals during the 2004 Stanley Cup playoffs for Detroit, who were eliminated by the eventual Western Conference champion Calgary Flames in six games in the second round.

=== Phoenix Coyotes (2004–2005) ===
The Stars thought they were on the verge of signing Hull to a one-year contract for 2004–05, but he instead accepted a two-year, $4.5 million contract with the Phoenix Coyotes. The first year of the contract was wiped out when the season was cancelled due to a labor stoppage. When play resumed in 2005–06, Hull returned to the ice wearing his father's jersey number 9. The Coyotes franchise, which had relocated from Winnipeg in 1996, continued to honor the Jets' retired numbers, including the elder Hull's. Bobby requested that the team un-retire his number and allow his son to wear it. However, after playing just five games and recording one assist, Hull felt that he was no longer able to play at the level he expected of himself. On October 15, 2005, he announced his retirement as a player.

== International play ==
As a dual Canadian and American citizen, Hull was eligible to play for either country internationally. While playing at UMD, he was passed over by Team Canada coach Dave King when selecting the roster for the 1986 World Ice Hockey Championships. However, American national team coach Dave Peterson invited him to join their squad. Hull accepted and led the team in scoring with 7 goals and 11 points for the sixth place Americans. Hull later said the faith shown in him by American officials gave him the confidence to excel in his career. He played with Team USA for the rest of his career, and at the 1986 Calgary Cup tournament, played a pivotal role in a 5–3 upset of Canada by the Americans. Following the game, he said "I don't feel more like an American than a Canadian. I just want to play."

Hull tied Mike Modano for the American scoring lead at the 1991 Canada Cup with nine points. He led the Americans into the tournament final against Canada, but was held pointless in the decisive game as Canada won the tournament with a 4–2 game. Canadian fans turned on Hull at the inaugural World Cup of Hockey in 1996. In the semifinal against Russia, fans in Ottawa loudly booed Hull and chanted "traitor" towards him as he scored two goals to lead the United States to the final against Canada. In the deciding game of the best-of-three final, Hull scored a key goal as the Americans turned a 2–1 deficit with five minutes to play into a 5–2 victory and captured the championship. Hull led all players with 11 points and was a tournament all-star at forward.

Making his Olympic debut at the 1998 Winter Games, Hull scored two goals in four games. The Americans were quickly eliminated from the tournament and were criticized for their lack of desire and leadership. The team was further embarrassed when it was discovered some members had trashed their hotel room following their elimination. Hull was initially blamed as being a culprit. He angrily denied the accusation and claimed it was an invention of Canadian media upset that he was playing for the United States. Hull, Modano and John LeClair formed the American's top line for the 2002 Olympics. The trio were dominant throughout most of the tournament, leading Team USA to the gold medal game against Canada. Hull and LeClair finished second and third in overall scoring, respectively; however they were held pointless against Team Canada in the final. Hull and the Americans settled for the silver medal following a 5–2 defeat.

Team USA named Hull an alternate captain of its veteran-laden team for the 2004 World Cup of Hockey. However, he was benched by head coach Ron Wilson following two indifferent games in which he did not register a point and never returned to the active lineup.

== Playing style ==
Upon his arrival in the NHL, Hull was considered a "one-dimensional player". He was a natural goal scorer with a reputation for being uninterested in backchecking and playing defense. He was nicknamed "The Incredible Hull" (a reference to Bruce Banner) in college for his scoring exploits and was called "The Golden Brett" in the NHL, a play on his father's nickname of "The Golden Jet". Hull was often compared to Bobby in his early years, though the two shared few similarities on the ice. Both were known for their shooting ability, particularly the power of their slapshot, which Terry Crisp — who played against Bobby and coached Brett — described as "explosive", but while Bobby was a left wing known for both his conditioning and skating ability, Hull played right wing, was a poorer skater and lacked his father's physique.

His reputation for defensive indifference persisted through much of his career. In his 72-goal season of 1989–90, Hull's plus-minus (net difference of even strength and shorthanded goals scored for and against while he was on the ice) was −1. He was a −27 four years later despite scoring 54 goals. Hull also carried a reputation as a player who could not win as his Blues' teams rarely achieved success in the playoffs. He shed that reputation after leading his teams to championships at the 1996 World Cup of Hockey and the 1999 Stanley Cup Finals. To win that 1999 championship, Hull also had to fit in with the Dallas Stars' defense-oriented system. He finished that season with a career-best plus-minus of +19.

Known as an outspoken player, Hull earned a reputation on and off the ice for speaking bluntly and without regard for whom it might offend. He chastised his own fans in 1992 — later backtracking — when they booed Adam Oates following Oates' trade request, calling them "losers" and stating he wanted to rip one particular fan's head off. Hull was a consistent critic of the NHL's defensive, "clutch and grab" era of the late 1990s, raising the ire of commissioner Gary Bettman in 1998 when he said "I wouldn't pay to watch. It's boring. The whole style of the game is terrible. There's no flow. When a guy like [Mario] Lemieux leaves the game and tells you why he's leaving, and you don't address it, that's stupid. But the players don't say crap. That's why I always look like the big mouth."

Hull played in eight NHL All-Star Games, and was named the most valuable player of the 1992 game in Philadelphia. As of 2022, his 741 career goals is the fifth highest total in NHL history, and Hull was the third-fastest (behind Wayne Gretzky and Alex Ovechkin) to reach 700 goals, doing so in 1,157 games. He is also third all-time in power play goals with 265 and third in game-winning goals with 110. With 24 career game-winning playoff goals, he is tied with Gretzky for the most all-time. He scored 33 hat tricks in his career, the fourth highest in NHL history. Hull holds numerous St. Louis Blues franchise records, including goals (527), power play goals (195), game-winning goals (70) and hat tricks (27). He also holds the organization's single-season records of goals (86) and points (131). In honor of his achievements with the team, the Blues retired his jersey number 16 in 2006. The team also arranged to have a portion of the street that runs alongside the Enterprise Center renamed "Brett Hull Way". In 2010, the team unveiled a statue of him in front of the arena. Hull was inducted into the United States Hockey Hall of Fame in 2008, and into the Hockey Hall of Fame in 2009.

== Management career ==
Hull worked two jobs in 2006–07. He served as a special assistant to the team president of the Dallas Stars and provided studio analysis for NHL on NBC telecasts. He left NBC after one season when he was named a special adviser to the team's hockey operations department. Hull was promoted to interim co-general manager of the Stars, sharing the role with Les Jackson after Doug Armstrong was fired on November 13, 2007. ESPN analyst Scott Burnside criticized the promotion of Hull, noting his lack of front office experience and questionable work ethic.

The pair made one of the most prominent trades in the 2007–08 NHL season, acquiring Brad Richards from the Tampa Bay Lightning as part of a five-player trade. The team went on to reach the Western Conference Final of the 2008 Stanley Cup Playoffs, the Stars' deepest playoff run in eight years. Team owner Tom Hicks rewarded the pair with three-year contracts and named them permanent co-general managers. He credited Hull for his positive relationship with the players and his "unconventional wisdom".

The signing of controversial forward Sean Avery prior to the 2008–09 season proved a turning point for Hull and Jackson. Avery's erratic behavior created divisions within the team's locker room, particularly after he made derogatory comments towards another player's girlfriend in the media. The Stars missed the playoffs that season, leading the team to replace Hull and Jackson as general manager with Joe Nieuwendyk. Hull remained with the organization, serving as an adviser to Hicks and team president Jeff Cogen. Hull has since been hired by the St. Louis Blues as their executive vice president for business development.

On May 21, 2019, after the Blues advanced to the Stanley Cup Finals for the first time in 49 years, Hull was not able to control his emotions and cried, saying "I'm in there. I'm not a crier, but I'm crying....I saw Bobby Plager and I'm like 'Holy cow,'... 49 years in the making for this... These guys have played unbelievable."

On Saturday, June 15, 2019, after the St. Louis Blues won their first Stanley Cup, Hull took the stage and led the crowd in a drunken ramble that echoed throughout the Jefferson National Expansion Memorial following the victory parade down Market Street. He coined the phrase, "We went Blues," explaining, "We don't have to go anymore, 'cause we already did it."

== Personal life ==
Hull lived in Dallas, Texas, with his second wife, Darcie. He has three children with his first wife, Alison: son Jude and daughters Jayde and Crosby. Jude also played hockey as a goaltender. He attended St. Olaf College until 2018, but while he has never played professionally he enjoys sharing an oral history of his families hockey legacy.

In business, Hull was twice involved in the operation of restaurants. He owned two eateries in St. Louis while he was a member of the Blues, and partnered with Mike Modano and others on a Dallas restaurant called "Hully and Mo Restaurant and Tap Room" following his playing career. He lent his name to a 1995 Super Nintendo Entertainment System video game called Brett Hull Hockey. Hull was a co-owner of the St. Louis Bandits, a junior team in the North American Hockey League. In November 2020, Hull returned to restaurant operation in the St. Louis area with the opening of Brett Hull's Junction in Wentzville, Missouri.

Hull is an avid golfer, often stating during his career that he preferred the sport to hockey. He was a frequent participant in the American Century Celebrity Golf Classic and his best finish at the tournament was a tie for fifth in 2008. He competes in several charity and celebrity tournaments, and in 2009 was ranked as the sixth best athlete golfer in North America by Golf Digest.

== In other media ==
Hull was a guest on the Weekend Update segment of the December 11, 2004, episode of Saturday Night Live.

Hull made a special guest appearance as the USA hockey team captain in the What's New, Scooby-Doo? episode, "Diamonds Are a Ghoul's Best Friend".

== Career statistics ==
=== Regular season and playoffs ===
Bold indicates led league

			Regular season					Playoffs
Season	Team	League	GP	G	A	Pts	PIM	GP	G	A	Pts	PIM
1982–83	Penticton Knights	BCJHL	50	48	56	104	27	—	—	—	—	—
1983–84	Penticton Knights	BCJHL	56	105	83	188	20	—	—	—	—	—
1984–85	University of Minnesota-Duluth	WCHA	48	32	28	60	12	—	—	—	—	—
1985–86	University of Minnesota-Duluth	WCHA	42	52	32	84	46	—	—	—	—	—
1985–86	Calgary Flames	NHL	—	—	—	—	—	2	0	0	0	0
1986–87	Moncton Golden Flames	AHL	67	50	42	92	16	3	2	2	4	2
1986–87	Calgary Flames	NHL	5	1	0	1	0	4	2	1	3	0
1987–88	Calgary Flames	NHL	52	26	24	50	12	—	—	—	—	—
1987–88	St. Louis Blues	NHL	13	6	8	14	4	10	7	2	9	4
1988–89	St. Louis Blues	NHL	78	41	43	84	33	10	5	5	10	6
1989–90	St. Louis Blues	NHL	80	**72**	41	113	24	12	13	8	21	17
1990–91	St. Louis Blues	NHL	78	**86**	45	131	22	13	11	8	19	4
1991–92	St. Louis Blues	NHL	73	**70**	39	109	48	6	4	4	8	4
1992–93	St. Louis Blues	NHL	80	54	47	101	41	11	8	5	13	2
1993–94	St. Louis Blues	NHL	81	57	40	97	38	4	2	1	3	0
1994–95	St. Louis Blues	NHL	48	29	21	50	10	7	6	2	8	0
1995–96	St. Louis Blues	NHL	70	43	40	83	30	13	6	5	11	10
1996–97	St. Louis Blues	NHL	77	42	40	82	10	6	2	7	9	2
1997–98	St. Louis Blues	NHL	66	27	45	72	26	10	3	3	6	2
1998–99	Dallas Stars	NHL	60	32	26	58	30	22	8	7	15	4
1999–00	Dallas Stars	NHL	79	24	35	59	43	23	11	13	24	4
2000–01	Dallas Stars	NHL	79	39	40	79	18	10	2	5	7	6
2001–02	Detroit Red Wings	NHL	82	30	33	63	35	23	10	8	18	4
2002–03	Detroit Red Wings	NHL	82	37	39	76	22	4	0	1	1	0
2003–04	Detroit Red Wings	NHL	81	25	43	68	12	12	3	2	5	4
2005–06	Phoenix Coyotes	NHL	5	0	1	1	0	—	—	—	—	—
NHL totals			1,269	741	650	1,391	458	202	103	87	190	73

=== International ===
Year	Team	Event	Result	GP	G	A	Pts	PIM
1986	United States	WC	6th	10	7	4	11	18
1991	United States	CC	2nd place, silver medalist(s)	8	2	7	9	0
1996	United States	WCH	1st place, gold medalist(s)	7	7	4	11	4
1998	United States	Oly	6th	4	2	1	3	0
2002	United States	Oly	2nd place, silver medalist(s)	6	3	5	8	6
2004	United States	WCH	4th	2	0	0	0	2
Senior totals				37	21	21	42	30

== Awards and achievements ==
Award	Year	Ref
NHL
NHL All-Star Game	1989, 1990, 1991, 1992, 1993, 1994, 1996, 1997, 2001	
NHL First All-Star Team	1990, 1991, 1992	
Lady Byng Memorial Trophy	1990	
Hart Memorial Trophy	1991	
Lester B. Pearson Award	1991	
Stanley Cup champion	1999 (Dallas), 2002 (Detroit)	
One of 100 Greatest NHL Players	2017	
AHL
Dudley "Red" Garrett Memorial Award; Rookie of the year	1987	
First All-Star Team	1987	
The Hockey News Minor League Player of the Year	1987	
NCAA
Jerry Chumola Award; UMD rookie of the year	1985	
WCHA rookie of the year	1985	
WCHA First All-Star Team	1986	

== See also ==
- Brett Hull Hockey, a 1994 video game
- Brett Hull Hockey '95, a 1995 video game
- List of NHL statistical leaders
- Notable families in the NHL

Awards and achievements
Preceded by Rick Kosti	WCHA Freshman of the Year; 1984–85	Succeeded by Mike Richter
Preceded by Joe Mullen	Winner of the Lady Byng Trophy; 1990	Succeeded by Wayne Gretzky
Preceded by Mark Messier	Winner of the Hart Memorial Trophy; 1991	Succeeded by Mark Messier
Preceded by Mark Messier	Lester B. Pearson Award winner 1991	Succeeded by Mark Messier
Preceded by Mario Lemieux	NHL Goal Leader; 1990, 1991, 1992	Succeeded by Teemu Selanne; Alexander Mogilny
Preceded by Garth Butcher	St. Louis Blues captain 1992–95	Succeeded by Shayne Corson
Preceded by Doug Armstrong	General Manager of the Dallas Stars; 2007–09 with Les Jackson	Succeeded by Joe Nieuwendyk
