= The Incredible Hulk: Ultimate Destruction =

2005 video game

- Cover art by Bryan Hitch
- Developer: Radical Entertainment
- Publisher: Vivendi Universal Games (Note: Released under the Sierra Entertainment brand name)
- Director: Mark James
- Producers: Tim Bennison; Vlad Ceraldi
- Designer: Eric Holmes
- Programmer: Chris Cudahy
- Artist: Martin Bae
- Writer: Paul Jenkins
- Composer: Bill Brown
- Engine: Titanium
- Platforms: PlayStation 2, Xbox, GameCube
- Release: NA: August 23, 2005; PAL: September 9, 2005
- Genre: Action-adventure
- Mode: Single-player

The Incredible Hulk: Ultimate Destruction is a 2005 action-adventure video game developed by Radical Entertainment and published by Vivendi Universal Games (VU Games) for the GameCube, PlayStation 2 and Xbox. The game is based on the Marvel Comics superhero the Hulk and showcases an open world with destructible environments. The narrative follows the Hulk as he is subconsciously influenced by his human alter-ego Bruce Banner and his psychotherapist Leonard Samson into assembling a device that will mend Banner's psyche and prevent the emergence of a darker personality. Aside from advancing the game's story, the player can engage in side missions and purchase new abilities for the Hulk.

Development of a sequel to Radical Entertainment's Hulk was revealed when the developer and VU Games announced a partnership. Ultimate Destruction's direction was influenced by critical reactions to Hulk, which resulted in free-roaming gameplay that emphasized environmental destruction while omitting stealth elements. Marvel Comics veterans Paul Jenkins and Bryan Hitch were recruited to create the game's story and provide visual design respectively.

The Incredible Hulk: Ultimate Destruction was positively received, with reviewers praising the visceral satisfaction of wielding the Hulk's powers in an open and destructible environment. The challenge level, controls, move set, character and effect animations, and audio were also commended. The missions and story received mixed responses, and the environments were criticized. The game was less commercially successful than Hulk, which was attributed to its lack of a film tie-in. However, it served as an influence on the subsequent The Incredible Hulk game released in 2008, and it has been ranked among the best Marvel-based video games.

== Gameplay ==
The gameplay of The Incredible Hulk: Ultimate Destruction takes place in an open world environment

The Incredible Hulk: Ultimate Destruction is a third-person action-adventure game in which the player controls the Hulk, the super-powered alter-ego of scientist Bruce Banner. Influenced by hypnotic suggestions from Banner's psychotherapist Leonard Samson, the Hulk is tasked with gathering resources for a machine that will cure Banner of the infliction that causes his transformations into the Hulk. Between each story-based mission, the Hulk can freely explore the game's open world as well as engage in side missions such as playing rounds of golf with giant balls and clubs or carrying an ambulance to a hospital. His location in the world is tracked by a radar on the bottom-left corner of the screen, and a variety of icons on the radar indicate mission objectives; for example, a red fist indicates something that must be destroyed, while a blue shield indicates something that must be protected. Samson's base is indicated by a green house icon.

The Hulk can jump great distances, run up and down walls, and climb, as well as a series of basic attacks and grapples to use against enemy characters. The Hulk can grab and use several objects as weapons, such as wielding a lamppost as a club. Larger objects, such as cars and tanks, can be picked up and thrown to dispatch groups of enemies from a distance. The Hulk's health is represented by a bar on the upper-left corner of the screen, while a second bar below it increases whenever the Hulk takes damage or destroys property. When this bar is filled, the Hulk enters a "critical mass" state where he can make his most powerful and devastating moves. However, using these moves depletes the bar, causing the Hulk to drop out of critical mass. When his health drops to a certain level, the Hulk will enter an "adrenaline surge" state similar to critical mass, in which he can use the same moves without depleting the critical mass bar.

If the Hulk causes wanton destruction during the free-roaming gameplay, the spokes of an "emergency response meter" on the screen's upper-right corner will extend. When the meter's center lights up, a military strike team will be dispatched to combat the Hulk. Accomplishing missions, destroying property, and defeating enemies earn the Hulk "smash points", which can be used to purchase new moves at Samson's base. Such moves include new ways to weaponize objects, such as using two halves of a car as steel gloves or a flattened car as a shield. Each mission that is completed unlocks additional moves to purchase. Some moves have dependencies and are unavailable until the moves they are based on have been purchased. Hidden throughout the world are sixty collectible comic book covers from the Incredible Hulk series that unlock a variety of rewards, including artwork, skins, and cheats.

== Plot ==
Scientist Bruce Banner has spent years in semi-isolation researching a potential cure for an affliction that transforms him into the Hulk when he is angered or stressed. He has created an experimental device intended to modify his subconscious and repair psychological damage inflicted upon him by childhood trauma, thus subduing the Hulk as well as another, more menacing personality that is emerging within him. Working alongside psychotherapist Leonard Samson, Banner nearly completes the device, but military forces led by Emil Blonsky destroy his forest hideout. As Banner escapes in the form of the Hulk, Blonsky takes the device from the hideout's remains and is exposed to gamma rays. Banner regroups with Samson, who equips Banner with a device that implants post-hypnotic suggestions and artificially induces episodes of rage, allowing them a degree of control over the Hulk. Samson sends the Hulk on various errands into the city and the badlands to help construct the machine or hinder Blonsky's ever-growing presence.

Meanwhile, Blonsky's superior, General Thunderbolt Ross, chastises him for overstepping his authority to secure a mysterious prisoner, "Mission Directive", in a secret military research facility known as the Vault. Following this argument, Blonsky transforms into a reptilian monster known as the Abomination and goes on a rampage until the Hulk arrives and defeats him. As the Hulk escapes, Blonsky returns to normal and claims to his men that the wreckage is the Hulk's doing. While retrieving fuel rods at a nuclear power plant, the Hulk encounters Blonsky's bodyguard Mercy. Upon her defeat, Mercy attempts to divulge the true nature of Mission Directive, but is killed when Blonsky orders an air strike on the plant. Although Banner escapes with his life, the stress of the situation takes its toll, and his evil alter ego, the Devil Hulk, begins to emerge.

Under the Devil Hulk's influence, the Hulk destroys civilian buildings and kills many innocents under the illusion that Samson is ordering him to destroy military locations. After fearing the threat of an out-of-control Hulk, Samson lures the Hulk into a military test site, where Ross faces the Hulk in a gigantic Hulkbuster mech. When the Hulk emerges victorious, Samson renders the Hulk unconscious with his hypnotic device. Banner is taken to the Vault, where Blonsky prepares to peel open Banner's mind in search of the secret to controlling gamma-based transformations. The agony of Banner's interrogation draws out the Devil Hulk's power, and the Hulk breaks free. Blonsky transforms into the Abomination when the Hulk corners him, exposing his identity to Samson and the military. Blaming the Hulk for ruining his life, the Abomination flees the Vault, as does the Hulk. Banner confronts Samson for betraying him, but forgives him when Samson reveals that he used Banner's captivity as a diversion to secure a vital component of the machine. As Samson makes the final adjustments, the Hulk defends the base from Ross's forces. Using the finished machine to venture into his psyche, Banner defeats and banishes the Devil Hulk.

Meanwhile, the Abomination breaks into the Vault to retrieve Mission Directive. The Hulk follows him, but discovers that Mission Directive is Blonsky's now-deceased wife Nadia and their unborn child; following Nadia's diagnosis of ovarian cancer, Blonsky exposed her to gamma radiation as part of a government program influenced by Banner's research. Blaming Banner for Nadia's death, the Abomination departs from the Vault and heads for the local dam, planning to destroy it and the city below. The Hulk and the military pursue the Abomination, but fail to prevent him from breaking the dam. As the Abomination disappears under the current, the Hulk causes a landslide to stop the water and save the city. Despite this heroic act, Ross publicly blames the Hulk for the dam's destruction to cover his mistakes. After lamenting this turn of events, Samson offers his help again, but Banner turns him down, believing the world will never trust the Hulk, and sets off on his own.

== Development and release ==
VU Games and Radical Entertainment jointly announced a partnership in February 2004 under which Radical would create six license-based multi-platform games published by VU Games, including a sequel to Hulk (2003) tentatively titled The Hulk 2. The partnership was influenced by the commercial success of Hulk and The Simpsons: Hit & Run (2003). Michael Pole, executive vice president of worldwide product development for VU Games, confirmed that The Hulk 2 would not be based on any theatrical production, and was slated for a mid-2005 release. Another working title, The Incredible Hulk, was revealed in December, as was its status as a free-roaming game. The final title was revealed by Marvel Studios in a webcast conference on March 7, 2005. Producer Vlad Ceraldi subsequently clarified that The Incredible Hulk: Ultimate Destruction would not be a sequel to Hulk, and would instead be an original story based on the comics.. The development team peaked at around 45-50 people.

The game's direction was based on reactions to the previous Hulk game; the development team built upon the game's feeling of controlling the Hulk's power, combat style, and environmental interaction, drawing from the tutorial level as a particular influence. The free-roaming element and the omission of Bruce Banner from the gameplay were based on negative responses to the previous game's limited corridor-based level design and stealth levels, respectively. To achieve an authentic comic book experience, Radical collaborated with Marvel Comics veterans Paul Jenkins and Bryan Hitch, who were heavily involved in the game's development: Jenkins wrote the story, script, and in-game dialogue, and provided suggestions for the gameplay, while Hitch provided visual design for the main characters, concept art, and the box art.

Martin Bae, Eric Holmes, Mark James, and Chris Cudahy reprised their respective roles as art director, game designer, director, and lead programmer from Hulk. For the game's visuals, the team opted for a "hyper realistic" style rather than the cel shaded graphics of the previous game. According to Holmes, the game's irreverent side missions were created to break up the pace and intensity of the story, which Holmes described as "quite dark". The voice cast features Neal McDonough as Bruce Banner (reprising his role from the 1996 TV series), Ron Perlman as Emil Blonsky / Abomination, and Richard Moll as the Devil Hulk. Other cast members include Daniel Riordan as Doc Samson, Vanessa Marshall as Mercy, Dave Thomas as Thunderbolt Ross, and Michael Donovan as Grey Hulk. Actors credited as "additional voice talent" include Kari Wahlgren, Cam Clarke, Fred Tatasciore, Nolan North, Keith Ferguson, John DiMaggio, and Richard McGonagle. The score was composed by Bill Brown and performed by the Los Angeles Orchestra. The game supports Dolby 5.1 for the Xbox and Dolby Pro Logic II and I for the PlayStation 2 and GameCube, respectively. Additionally, the Xbox version supports 720p widescreen, and the PlayStation 2 version supports progressive scan. The latter feature was initially omitted from the GameCube version after Nintendo removed component video support from newly manufactured GameCube consoles in 2004. However, based on an overwhelming response by the gaming public to an article by IGN covering the decision, Radical later added both progressive scan and widescreen support to the GameCube version.

The Incredible Hulk: Ultimate Destruction went gold on August 5, 2005, and was released in North America on August 23. Those who pre-ordered the game received a limited edition reprint of The Incredible Hulk #1, with an exclusive cover by Jimmy Palmiotti, Amanda Conner, and Paul Mounts. The game was released in Europe on September 9.

== Reception ==
Reception

Aggregate score
Aggregator	Score		
Aggregator	GameCube	PS2	Xbox
Metacritic	84/100	83/100	84/100

Review scores
Publication	Score		
Publication	GameCube	PS2	Xbox
1Up.com	8.5/10	8.5/10	8.5/10
Electronic Gaming Monthly	25.5/30	25.5/30	25.5/30
EP Daily	N/A	N/A	9/10
Eurogamer	N/A	N/A	8/10
G4	4/5	4/5	4/5
Game Informer	8.25/10	8.25/10	8.25/10
GamePro	N/A	4/5	N/A
GameRevolution	B+	B+	B+
GameSpot	8.2/10	8.2/10	8.2/10
GameSpy	4.5/5	4.5/5	4.5/5
GameZone	8.8/10	8.5/10	8.9/10
IGN	8.4/10	8.4/10	8.4/10
Nintendo World Report	9/10	N/A	N/A
Official U.S. PlayStation Magazine	N/A	8.6/10	N/A
PALGN	N/A	N/A	7.5/10

The Incredible Hulk: Ultimate Destruction received "generally favorable" reviews on all platforms according to the review aggregation website Metacritic. Jeremy Dunham of IGN proclaimed it to be "the deepest, most accurate recreation of the Jade Giant that anybody could ever hope for", Tom Byron – writing for Electronic Gaming Monthly – considered it to be "quite possibly the best superhero game to date", and David Chapman of the Electric Playground described it as a "non-stop adrenaline buffet that reaches out, grabs the player's attention, and never lets go". Reviewers interpreted the game's free-roaming format as being influenced by Spider-Man 2, and enjoyed the visceral feeling of the combat and rampaging through the city. According to Michael Knutson of GameZone, the game "truly captures the essence of the Hulk comic books". Johnathan Metts of Nintendo World Report viewed it as "one of the most satisfying mayhem simulators I've ever played". John Davison of 1Up.com and Steven Hopper of GameZone respectively compared the feeling of the gameplay's destructive aspect to that of War of the Monsters and Rampage. The boss fights were considered a highlight, with Alex Navarro of GameSpot and Eduardo Vasconcellos of GameSpy respectively deeming them "consistently excellent" and "a true battle of titans". Dunham regarded the boss fights as "[his] favorite end-stage nemeses since God of War and DMC3"; both he and Matt Keller of PALGN particularly praised the fight against General Ross's Hulkbuster for its scale.

While critics praised the game's level of challenge, responses to the missions were mixed. Byron positively compared the game to God of War concerning the intensity of its later missions. Navarro was fond of missions based on "blowing everything up and punching the hell out of all manner of tank and anti-Hulk robot," but was frustrated by quests based around escorting, fetching items, or pursuing targets. He also warned of "some annoying sections" caused by large and inopportune swarms of enemies, and Juba of Game Informer was also annoyed by the "never-ending salvos of missiles that frustrate your every attempt to do cool stuff". Metts felt that a few missions were complicated and lengthy, and noted that they lacked checkpoints in some cases. Michael Lafferty of GameZone perceived the missions as "pretty short", and additionally dismissed the side missions as "too simplistic and detract[ing] from the story". Dunham wished for a more varied mission structure, arguing that it "essentially breaks down to finding various ways to destroy things that you can have just as much fun destroying on your own anyway". Vasconcellos cited the frequency of load times as a drawback. While Justin Leeper of G4 was content with the challenge provided by enemy AI, Navarro claimed that it can "sometimes act up", observing that "some enemies, like the smaller Hulkbuster mechs, can be beaten extremely easily by a couple of specific attacks via a fairly cheap exploit. Other times, the enemies will be locked into specific attack patterns that cause them to get hung up on pieces of the scenery, or they otherwise become incapacitated".

Critics praised the controls as tight and intuitive, and lauded the expansive move set for providing a satisfactory amount of depth. Chapman was pleased by the game's "surprising amount of depth, courtesy of the Hulk's more advanced library of moves and combos". Navarro stated "There are literally dozens upon dozens of moves to unlock, and almost all of them are an absolute riot". He added that having Smash Points, which are used to purchase new moves, be earned by destroying the environment made the game feel rewarding instead of stingy. According to Dunham, the game's move set "makes Spider-Man 2 look like Super Mario Bros.". He extolled the game's move progression system, affirming that it "steadily transforms you from a mindless oversized pugilist into an unstoppable engine of destruction". Metts also applauded the game's "plethora of moves", but wished for a customizable button layout, as he felt that the default assignment for the jumping and punching buttons created an "unnecessary" learning curve. Juba argued that while the game has a large roster of moves, the story missions rarely require players to use their full range of abilities. Ouroboros of GamePro observed that the same controls that give the Hulk a "bulky yet responsive" feel during the main gameplay felt "sluggish and unwieldy" during many of the side missions. Navarro criticized the camera as being somewhat obstinate.

Assessments of the visuals were somewhat positive. The model and animation for the Hulk were well received, as were those of the enemy characters and vehicles. The destruction effects were also admired. Dunham noted some "slight graphical issues" but was overall impressed with the game's engine and admired the "number of deformable objects, particle effects, and units onscreen at one time". Hopper enjoyed the destructible environments, feeling that they "buckle and smash realistically and look great", and was also pleased with the game forfeiting its predecessor's cel-shaded appearance, which he feels adds room for more detail and definition for the characters. Some critics were however disappointed in the game's environments, deeming them lacking in variety and detail; while Ouroboros felt that the Hulk was "rendered and animated beautifully, with loving attention to detail", he dismissed both the city and badlands as feeling nondescript. Although Keller praised the city's draw distance, the debris and destruction effects as well as the modelling and animation for the Hulk and his larger foes, he added that "many of the smaller components of the game - namely cars and civilians, look rather crap". The frame rate, while considered solid and consistent, was found to experience occasional slowdown during more chaotic moments, particularly on the GameCube version.

The game's audio was commended for its sound design, music, and voice-acting. Metts declared that the game had "some of the best sound effects [he] heard in any game". Duke Ferris of GameRevolution enjoyed hearing the "satisfying smashes and crashes and roars of rage, not to mention the screams of the panicked populace". Davison praised Bill Brown for his work, which he described as "rousing and dramatic". Keller declared that the tracks Brown provided to the game "give off a great feeling and suit the action to a T". Leeper was less enthusiastic of the music, feeling that it "doesn't quite reach the level of intensity of the gameplay". Vasconcellos regarded the voice cast as "top-notch", specifically giving praise to McDonough for his portrayal of Bruce Banner. Knutson also admired the voice cast, stating "Every single actor did a wonderful job portraying the character that they were chosen to act out, and it fits really well with this game". Ouroboros was surprised by the liveliness of the voice-acting, although perplexed by the Hulk's lack of verbal expression during gameplay.

Reactions to the narrative were mixed. Keller claimed the game had "a solid narrative and good presentation". Chapman found it surprisingly deep, noting that it was "filled with drama, intrigue, betrayal, conspiracies, and oh yeah... lots and lots of destruction". Metts regarded the story as intelligently crafted, citing that it "manages to bring in some interesting support characters while, more importantly, providing some variety in Hulk's objectives". Dunham stated that the game had a "strong storyline", giving credit to Paul Jenkins for his "writing talents". He, however, felt that it was hampered by the game shifting "back and forth between the occasional cool CG cutscenes and several overly bland dialogue screens". Other reviewers were unimpressed. Davison regarded the story as "typical comic book fare", and felt that while it would certainly appeal to "hardcore fans [of the Hulk]", casual players "will pay little heed". Lafferty and Juba respectively found it to be "somewhat predictable" and "paper-thin". Leeper's assessment was especially dismissive, deeming the story "laughable even by fan-fiction standards".

=== Awards and nominations ===
The game was nominated for Action/Adventure Game of the Year at the 9th Annual Interactive Achievement Awards, but lost to God of War. It was also nominated for Outstanding Control Design and Outstanding Action Game (Sequel) in the 2005 NAVGTR Awards, but lost to Guitar Hero and Battlefield 2 respectively. In the 32nd Saturn Awards, it was nominated for Best Video Game Release (Science Fiction), but lost to Star Wars: Battlefront II.

Year	Award Ceremony	Category	Result	Ref.
2006	9th Annual Interactive Achievement Awards	Action/Adventure Game of the Year	Nominated	
2006	5th NAVGTR Awards	Outstanding Control Design	Nominated	
2006	5th NAVGTR Awards	Outstanding Action Game (Sequel)	Nominated	
2006	32nd Saturn Awards	Best Video Game Release (Science Fiction)	Nominated	

== Legacy ==
According to Marvel executive Justin Lambros, The Incredible Hulk: Ultimate Destruction sold fewer copies than its predecessor due to its lack of a film tie-in. However, Lambros regarded it as the superior game, and its gameplay influenced the direction of the subsequent Hulk-based game The Incredible Hulk (2008), which was based on the 2008 film. It additionally influenced the gameplay of Radical Entertainment's later game Prototype (2009), as well as the open world setting of DC Universe Online (2011). The Incredible Hulk: Ultimate Destruction has been ranked among the best Marvel-based video games, as well as one of the best superhero-based video games.
