= Eric Holmes (video game designer) =

Scottish video game designer

- Areas: Writer, director, video game designer

Eric Holmes is a Scottish writer, creative director and video game designer. He is a graduate of the University of Edinburgh and has worked for DICE since February 2015. He has also worked in comics, being the writer of IDW Publishing's miniseries The Transformers: Megatron Origin.

== Works ==
- Earthworm Jim 3D (31 October 1999)
- State of Emergency (12 February 2002)
- Hulk (27 May 2003)
- The Incredible Hulk: Ultimate Destruction (23 August 2005)
- Prototype (9 June 2009)
- Infinity Blade (9 December 2010)
- Gears of War 3 (20 September 2011)
- Batman: Arkham Origins (25 October 2013)
- Battlefield 1 (21 October 2016)
- Fortnite (25 July 2017)
- Battlefield V (20 November 2018)
- Battlefield 2042 (19 November 2021)

== Past ==
- VIS Entertainment (Game designer), 1997–1999
- Probe Entertainment (Game designer), 1999–2000
- EA Canada (Game designer), 2000 – October 2001
- Radical Entertainment (Lead designer), October 2001 – April 2009
- Epic Games (Lead designer), July 2009 – October 2011
- WB Games Montréal (Creative director), October 2011 – February 2015
- EA DICE, February 2015 – present

== Related links ==
- Eric Holmes Personal Site at www.videogamedesign.net
- Eric Holmes at Mobygames
- Eric Holmes at IMDb
