= MTV Sports: Pure Ride =

2000 video game

- Developers: Radical Entertainment (PS); Visual Impact (GBC)
- Publisher: THQ
- Platforms: PlayStation, Game Boy Color
- Release: PlayStation: NA: September 28, 2000; EU: November 3, 2000; Game Boy Color: NA: November 29, 2000; EU: 2000
- Genre: Snowboarding
- Modes: Single-player, multiplayer

MTV Sports: Pure Ride is a snowboarding video game developed by Radical Entertainment and Visual Impact and published by THQ for the PlayStation and Game Boy Color in 2000.

== Gameplay ==
This game has a fair number of game modes and level types available, including Slopestyle mode; a tour challenge where the player can compete in all-new half-pipes and other events to unlock goodies; an exclusive stunt mode where the player can combine jumps, tricks, and grinds; and the Build a Mountain mode where players can place cars, trees, and rails in three diverse environments. There are also songs in the game soundtrack, including "Privilege" by Incubus.

== Development and release ==
The PlayStation version of MTV Sports: Pure Ride was unveiled at E3 2000, and shipped to North American retailers on September 28, 2000, while the Game Boy Color version was released on November 29.

== Reception ==
Reception

Aggregate scores
Aggregator	Score	
Aggregator	GBC	PS
GameRankings	63%	75%
Metacritic	N/A	70/100

Review scores
Publication	Score	
Publication	GBC	PS
AllGame	N/A	3.5/5
CNET Gamecenter	N/A	7/10
Electronic Gaming Monthly	N/A	14.5/30 (Note: Two critics of Electronic Gaming Monthly gave the PlayStation version each a score of 6/10, and the other gave it 2.5/10.)
Game Informer	N/A	6.5/10
GameRevolution	N/A	B
GameSpot	N/A	7.3/10
IGN	6/10	7.7/10
Official U.S. PlayStation Magazine	N/A	3.5/5
PlayStation: The Official Magazine	N/A	6/10

The PlayStation version received "mixed or average" reviews according to the review aggregator Metacritic.
