= Grid Runner =

1996 video game

- PlayStation cover art
- Developer: Radical Entertainment
- Publisher: Virgin Interactive Entertainment
- Producers: Brian Thalken; Stacy Allyn Hendrickson
- Designers: Ryan Slemko; Christopher Mair
- Programmers: Stephen Lyons; Michael Gyori; Johan Thornton
- Artists: Ryan Slemko; Cliff Garbutt; Ken Brown
- Composer: Paul Ruskay
- Platforms: PlayStation, Saturn, Windows
- Release: PlayStation: NA: November 13, 1996; JP: December 27, 1996; PAL: June 1997; Windows: NA: November 13, 1996; PAL: 1996; Saturn: NA: November 20, 1996; PAL: November 1996; JP: December 27, 1996
- Genre: Action
- Modes: Single-player, multiplayer

Grid Runner (known as Grid Run in Europe) is an action game developed by Radical Entertainment and published by Virgin Interactive Entertainment for the Sega Saturn, PlayStation, and Microsoft Windows in 1996. It is frequently described as a cross between tag and capture the flag, but the playing field is a maze-like grid which the players can manipulate to an extent. Players can either compete against each other in one-on-one matches or take on a series of AI opponents in the game's story mode. Grid Runner was first announced under the title "Eurit".

The game met with a generally positive response from critics, who generally said the game is at its most fun in the multiplayer mode.

== Gameplay ==
Grid Runner is a top-down game similar to tag. The object of the game is to capture a set amount of flags scattered around the playfield by touching them. Upon starting the game, two players must race to find the first flag. The first player to get to this flag will capture it, indicated by the flag changing to that player's color. The other player is marked as "it" and must then hunt down the other player, "tagging" them and making them "it" instead. Only the player not marked as "it" may capture flags. Flags which one player has already captured can be recaptured by the other player.

The map is in a grid, featuring numerous types of tiles allowing the player to speed up in one direction, teleport or allow further pathways to appear. Each player is armed with a laser gun that can slow the opponent down, and each player may build "bridges" to overcome gaps. The players may also use magic found on the map to slow down their opponent, teleport or speed up. Shields and time for the bonus stages are also collectible.

In single-player mode, each level is split into three rounds against an opponent, which the player must win in order to succeed. Opponents often come with certain abilities, such as better control on ice, or being able to build two "bridges" at once. After each level there is a bonus level in which more magic can be obtained.

== Plot ==
The protagonist Axxel and his partner Tara, a pair of freelance space adventurers, are sent on a mission to the Gridonion Asteroid Field, a path between Earth and the Nether-Planets, to find out why ships have been mysteriously disappearing. While investigating a seemingly deserted alien ship in the asteroid field, Axxel is captured by an evil witch, Empress Vorga, who then forces Axxel to play a deadly game competing against her demonic minions. If the player manages to beat all of the 14 monsters, Axxel fights Vorga herself. If he wins, the witch is destroyed and Axxel escapes just before the ship explodes.

== Development ==
According to Virgin Interactive Entertainment producer Stacy Hendrickson, the developer Radical Entertainment thought of Grid Runner as a "fun, original alternative two-player game" that would be neither a fighting or a sports title about a decade before the game was finally made, and that they also put "a lot of work on the AI" of single-player enemies. All of the game's cast of characters were first sketched on paper, then turned into sculptures, before finally being rendered in 3D to limit the use of "work-intensive, expensive rendering workstations".

== Reception ==
Reception

Review scores
Publication	Score
Electronic Gaming Monthly	7.675/10 (Saturn)
Famitsu	5/10, 7/10, 5/10, 5/10 (PS)
Game Informer	7.25/10 (Saturn); 7.0/10 (PlayStation)
GameRevolution	B
GameSpot	7.6/10 (PlayStation); 7.8/10 (Saturn); 6.4/10 (PC)
IGN	6/10 (PlayStation)
Next Generation	3/5 (PlayStation)
PC Gamer (US)	77%
Sega Saturn Magazine	79% (Saturn)

The game's console versions received positive reviews, earning it an averaged GameRankings score 76.20% from six reviews of the PlayStation version and 81% from four reviews of the Sega Saturn version. The PC version has a lower GameRankings score of 68% from three reviews.

Reviewing the PlayStation version, Next Generation opined, "While not particularly innovative, Gridrunner offers its share of fun, especially in multiplayer modes." Tim Soete of GameSpot likewise said that "there's nothing terribly innovative here", but was more enthusiastic, praising the numerous gameplay twists and increasingly challenging AI opponents, and summarizing the game as "a hectic, 3-D tag-capture-the-flag game that takes players on a relentless, nail-biting ride." GamePro's Johnny Ballgame said that "every game is a unique battle of strategy at a feverish pace." Like Soete, he praised the increasingly challenging opponents, but said the multiplayer is the best part of the game.

Covering the Saturn version, the four reviewers of Electronic Gaming Monthly praised the game's originality, intensity, and sense of fun, generally agreeing that it most excels in the two-player mode, though Dan Hsu said that battles between equally skilled players tend to be drawn-out. While remarking that the graphics are not as sharp as the PlayStation version's, GamePro's Tommy Glide was pleased with the variety of stages, tight controls, and combination of intense chases with strategic maze navigation. He also remarked that the player character's diverse abilities lead to each player developing their own play style. GameSpot staff summarized, "Like Bomberman, Tetris, and Face Ball, Grid Runner is a gamer's game that pulls you in and never lets go." They particularly approved of the multiplayer mode and wide variety of stages. Paul Glancey of Sega Saturn Magazine gave the game one of its few negative reviews, commenting, "What games did you buy your Saturn to play? ... Well, whatever it was we bet you didn't buy a Saturn to play a space-age version of Tag, and that's pretty much what you're getting in Grid Run." He particularly criticized the fact that players cannot defeat their opponents through purely violent means.
