= Brett Hull Hockey =

1994 video game

- North American cover art
- Developer: Radical Entertainment
- Publishers: NA: Accolade; EU: Sony Electronic Publishing
- Composer: Paul Wilkinson
- Series: Brett Hull Hockey
- Platform: Super NES
- Release: NA: January 1994; EU: 1994
- Genre: Sports
- Modes: Single-player, multiplayer

Brett Hull Hockey is an ice hockey video game developed by Radical Entertainment and published by Accolade for the Super Nintendo Entertainment System in North America in January 1994. It features former Canadian-American NHL player Brett Hull and is officially licensed from the NHL Players' Association.

Featuring the sports commentator Al Michaels as the play-by-play announcer, players have the choice to play across any of the game modes available against with either computer-controlled opponents or other players. Despite being licensed by the NHLPA, the game was not officially endorsed by the NHL and as such, all the teams are referred only by city with no use of the team name itself, in addition to not having either NHL team logos or NHL emblems to be seen anywhere in the title.

Brett Hull Hockey received mixed but positive reception when it was released. Ports for the Genesis, Jaguar, and Jaguar CD were in development but never released. A sequel, Brett Hull Hockey '95, was released the following year for MS-DOS, Genesis, and Super NES.

== Gameplay ==
A match between St. Louis and Vancouver

Brett Hull Hockey is an ice hockey game with a 2.5D perspective using sprites. Most of the rules from the sport are present in the title, though they can be disabled from the menu and in-game options. Other options are available such as turning on/off music and sound effects, along with the pre-game coaching mode which can turn a losing team into a winning team and vice versa, among other settings. Some of the gameplay options found within the game include an exhibition match, regular season and playoff competitions, among other modes of play. The announcer, Al Michaels, makes commentary during gameplay and announces Brett Hull by name but other players are only called by their respective jersey number due to the lack of the NHL license, while his commentaries can also be turned off on the options menu. Season progress is only kept via password and there is also a two-player option for every mode.

During gameplay, players are able to apply tactics such as multiple types of shots and checking for both offensive and defensive purposes respectively in order to score points. Offsides can occur if attacking players crossing the blue lines are entering the offensive zone (red zone), before the puck and anyone on either team touches the puck before leaving the red zone. Penalties are applied by an official when any of the rules are infringed, sending the offending player into the penalty box for a set number of minutes before re-entering into the playfield. Fights can also erupt at any moment between players from either team.

=== Teams ===
The teams in the game only represent their respective cities from both Canada and United States, in addition to featuring two original teams: Eastern All-Star and Western All-Star. Some of the teams available to choose in the game are:

Canada

- Calgary
- Edmonton
- Montreal
- Ottawa
- Quebec
- Toronto
- Vancouver
- Winnipeg

USA

- Anaheim
- Boston
- Buffalo
- Chicago
- Dallas
- Detroit
- Florida
- Hartford

USA (cont.)

- Los Angeles
- New Jersey
- NY Islanders
- NY Rangers
- Philadelphia
- Pittsburgh
- San Jose
- St. Louis

USA (cont.)

- Tampa Bay
- Washington

== Development and release ==
In April 1993, Accolade announced that it had signed exclusive licensing agreements with St. Louis Blues right winger Brett Hull and former New York Cosmos forward Pelé to endorse and help design sports games for the Super NES, Genesis, and MS-DOS. Brett Hull Hockey was released in January 1994 by Accolade, then in Europe by Sony Electronic Publishing later the same year. A version for the Genesis was advertised and planned for a 1993/1994 release in all regions, alongside the Super NES version. Unlike the Super NES version, which uses Mode 7 to display the playfield, the Genesis version used isometric graphics. Despite reportedly being completed, it was cancelled for unknown reasons.

=== Brett Hull NHL Hockey ===
Gameplay screenshot from the unreleased Brett Hull NHL Hockey for the Jaguar and Jaguar CD, showing a match between Western All-Stars and Eastern All-Stars.

In November 1993, Accolade signed an agreement with Atari Corporation to be a third-party developer for the recently released Atari Jaguar and licensed five titles from their catalog to Atari Corp. in order to be ported and released for the system, with Brett Hull Hockey being one of the five licensed games and it was first announced in early 1994. The port was later showcased by Atari in an early playable state at WCES '95 and slated for a Q2 1995 release, with plans to be published for both the Jaguar and Jaguar CD. It was later showcased in a more advanced state at E3 1995 and was later slated for a Q3 1995/November 1995 release.

Internal documents from Atari also revealed that Ringler Studios was developing the conversion and that it would feature the NHL license unlike the SNES original, with some magazines previewing the game under the title NHL Hockey, in addition to being listed as still being in development on August of the same year. Other internal documents from the company still listed the port as in development on December of the same year, with Atari sending the final builds of the game to both NHL and NHLPA for approval the next month. Despite the cartridge version being reviewed and rated by both Game Players and Next Generation magazines in their April and May 1996 issues respectively under its final title, Brett Hull NHL Hockey, neither version was ever released during the commercial run of the system, which was discontinued by Atari a month earlier before merging with JT Storage in a reverse takeover.

On May 14, 1999, Hasbro Interactive released the patents and rights of the Jaguar into public domain by declaring it as an open platform and opening the doors for homebrew development, allowing independent publisher and developers to release unfinished titles from the system's past life cycle. A beta build of the cartridge version of Brett Hull NHL Hockey was released by B&C Computervisions on January 9, 2004, for US$50. On May 14, 2009, the defunct Jaguar Sector II website released the CD version under the name Jaguar Hockey to avoid licensing issues for US$35. Aside from featuring the NHL license and updated graphics and sound compared to the SNES original, the differences between the cartridge and CD versions include bug fixes and full motion video cutscenes but longer loading screens, among others changes.

== Reception ==
Reception

Aggregate score
| Aggregator | Score |
|---|---|
| GameRankings | (SNES) 68% |

Review scores
| Publication | Score |
|---|---|
| AllGame | (SNES) 2.5/5 |
| Consoles + | (SNES) 83% |
| GamePro | (SNES) 16.5/20 |
| M! Games | (SNES) 75% |
| Mega Fun | (SNES) 76% |
| Next Generation | (Jaguar) 2/5 |
| Nintendo Power | (SNES) 13.7/20 |
| Player One | (SNES) 79% |
| Super Play | (SNES) 78% |
| Video Games (DE) | (SNES) 55% |
| Nintendo Player | (SNES) 3/6 |
| Play Time | (SNES) 64% |
| Total! | (SNES) 3 |

Brett Hull Hockey received mixed but positive reviews since its release.

Next Generation reviewed the Jaguar version of the game, and stated that "In the end, Brett Hull NHL Hockey, with its three camera options, commentating from Al Michaels, full NHL roster, and realistic graphics, would have no problem holding its own against any competitor if it weren't for the choppy gameplay."

== Legacy ==
With the advent of modern console emulation on computers and despite never being officially published, the previously unreleased Atari Jaguar version of Brett Hull Hockey has since received two unofficial ROM hacks that were released in 2013 and 2015, titled Jaguar Hockey Legends '13 and Jaguar Hockey League '15 respectively, featuring updated title and menu screens. However, in addition to containing then current-day professional rosters while maintaining the original gameplay, each of these hacked versions contains a unique roster set based in members of the Jaguar community. The 2015 edition would go on to receive a physical release by community member Gaztee at AtariAge forums later in the same year.
