= Power Piggs of the Dark Age =

1996 video game

- North American cover art
- Developer: Radical Entertainment
- Publisher: Titus France
- Designers: David Roberts; Brian Thalken; Emmanual Soupidis
- Composer: Marc Baril
- Platform: Super Nintendo Entertainment System
- Release: NA: May 1996; PAL: September 29, 1997
- Genres: Hack and slash, platform
- Mode: Single-player

Power Piggs of the Dark Age is a 1997 hack and slash platform video game developed by Radical Entertainment and published by Titus France for the Super Nintendo Entertainment System. A Sega Mega Drive version was planned but never released.

== Gameplay ==
Confronting the first boss of the game.

The video game takes place during the Dark Ages. In control of a group of humanoid pigs, the player's object is to defeat a warlock named the Wizard of Wolff, a humanoid wolf with strange magical powers. Each of the Power Piggs was planned to use their own medieval weapon and uses it to defeat minor enemies that lie in his path. However, the actual released version of the game featured only one playable character, Bruno, in spite of all three still appearing on the title screen.

The first stage is a typical medieval town but it only gets more surreal from there.

Doughnuts are seen as food in the game for the main characters. One of the main characters is a knight named Bruno; his secondary weapon happens to be pastries that explode on contact with the enemy.

Several in-game passwords help to reveal a mini-game in addition to hidden messages within the coding of the game itself.

== Reception ==
Reception

Review scores
Publication	Score
Consoles +	80%
Joypad	80%
M! Games	60%
Mega Fun	58%
Official Nintendo Magazine	76/100
Player One	68%
Super Play	42%
Total!	(UK) 59/100 (DE) 4-
Video Games (DE)	65%
Nintendo Magazine System	89/100
Power Unlimited	68/100
Super Play	54/100
Super Power	85%
Ultra Player	2/6
VideoGames	6/10

Power Piggs of the Dark Age received average reviews. Nintendo Power found the game fun and quite challenging, but saw the poor hit detection and some near-impossible jumps to be negative points. GamePro's Doctor Devon praised the character's moveset, cartoon-style graphics, humorous sound effects, and fast-paced music, though he acknowledged that the game lacked the sophistication of some of the more recent platform titles.
