= The Divide: Enemies Within =

1996 video game

- Developer: Radical Entertainment
- Publisher: Viacom New Media
- Designer: Ian Verchere
- Composer: Paul Ruskay
- Platforms: PlayStation, Windows
- Release: NA: 1997
- Genres: Action-adventure, Metroidvania
- Mode: Single-player

The Divide: Enemies Within is a 1997 action-adventure video game for the PlayStation and Windows.

== Development ==
The Divide: Enemies Within was developed by the Canadian-based company Radical Entertainment and published by Viacom New Media.

Director and designer Ian Verchere was a Metroid fan. He purposely designed The Divide to be a Metroid clone, knowing there could never be an official Metroid game for the PlayStation because it was a Nintendo series.

== Release ==
The Divide: Enemies Within was completed for the 1996 Christmas season but changed publishers during development. The developers had issues with finding a publisher for The Divide, finding that when they had one, it got bought out leaving them seeking a new company. According to Greg James, a programmer and QA Director at Radical Entertainment, the team had also developed a version of the game for the Sega Saturn.

While magazine Videogame Advisor and The Province had the game set to publish in November 1996, by December 1996 it was set for release in early 1997.

== Reception ==
Reception

Review scores
| Publication | Score |
|---|---|
| Electronic Gaming Monthly | 4.5/10, 5/10, 6/10, 6.5/10 (PS) |
| Next Generation | 2/5 (PS) |
| The Electric Playground | 9/10 (PS) |

Retro Gamer said the contemporary "were harsh". Scary Larry of GamePro, reviewing the PlayStation version, wrote, "If you do the math, you'll find that the Divide comes up short in all areas." He cited the blocky graphics, dull level design, and shaky controls which make the player's mech often aim incorrectly. Dan Hsu of Electronic Gaming Monthly said the story is "deep and involving", but that this does not matter in an action game. He and his three co-reviewers found the game generally average due to the low frame rate, uninspired graphics, and inaccurate aiming. A reviewer for Next Generation criticized the dark, grainy graphics, last generation gameplay, and difficulty with moving diagonally. He concluded that "The Divide: Enemies Within plays just well enough to avoid being insulting, but leaves the distinct impression it was thrown together using a recipe from some 'How to Make a Videogame' book. It's uninspired and lacking." In contrast, Victor Lucas of The Electric Playground called it "one of those consummate gamer's games. You know, the kind that will be talked about (and played) for a long, long time." While he agreed that the gameplay is last generation, he found it excellent due to the level design, massive length, and ongoing exploration of new and hidden areas. He also praised the game's cinematic intro, graphic design, and music.

Retro Gamer said the game was release was "bad timing" and "long before the term "Metroidvania" came into vogue and people started clamouring for all any such titles available." They said it was worked on two levels, with a "complicated, well written plot coupled with incredible atmosphere, which is backed by solid and accomplished gameplay."
