= Dark Summit =

2001 snowboarding video game

- North American GameCube cover art
- Developer: Radical Entertainment
- Publisher: THQ
- Director: Tom Legal
- Producers: Kirsten Forbes; Sean Dunn
- Designer: Pete Low
- Artist: Liezel Sinclair
- Writer: Justin Sheffield
- Composers: Allan Levy; Marc Baril; Adam Gejdes
- Platforms: Xbox, PlayStation 2, GameCube
- Release: Xbox: NA: November 15, 2001; EU: March 22, 2002; PlayStation 2: NA: November 27, 2001; EU: March 28, 2002; GameCube: NA: February 5, 2002; AU: May 17, 2002; EU: May 24, 2002
- Genre: Snowboarding
- Modes: Single-player, multiplayer

Dark Summit is a 2001 snowboarding video game developed by Radical Entertainment and published by THQ. It was released for the GameCube, PlayStation 2 and Xbox.

== Gameplay ==
Controls for Dark Summit resemble other skateboarding and snowboarding games of the time. The player is able to perform grinds/jibs, grabs, flips, and complete special tricks on the mountain, alien half-pipe and the chairlift half-pipe.

Different areas are accessed by chairlift, and unlocked via "Lift Points" earned by completing missions. Cosmetics and snowboard upgrades are unlocked through "Equipment Points", earned by completing tricks around the mountain. Special tricks and combos earn more Equipment Points. Lift Points and Equipment Points are accumulated, and for every milestone reached, the player unlocks a new area, cosmetic and snowboard upgrade.

There are 4 different unlockable snowboards by earning Equipment Points. The starting boards offers no advantage over the others and will quickly become obsolete. However, newer boards enhance the overall speed and trick performance of the player.

== Reception ==
Reception

Aggregate score
Aggregator	Score		
Aggregator	GameCube	PS2	Xbox
Metacritic	68/100	67/100	71/100

Review scores
Publication	Score		
Publication	GameCube	PS2	Xbox
Edge	N/A	N/A	2/10
Electronic Gaming Monthly	7/10	N/A	7/10 (Note: Three critics of Electronic Gaming Monthly gave the game each a score of 7/10.)
EP Daily	N/A	N/A	8/10
Game Informer	7/10	6.5/10	7/10
GameRevolution	N/A	N/A	C
GameSpot	7.2/10	7.8/10	7.1/10
GameSpy	70%	N/A	81%
IGN	6.5/10	7.6/10	7.9/10
Next Generation	N/A	N/A	3/5
Nintendo Power	3.3/5	N/A	N/A
Nintendo World Report	8/10	N/A	N/A
Official U.S. PlayStation Magazine	N/A	3.5/5	N/A
Official Xbox Magazine (US)	N/A	N/A	7/10
X-Play	N/A	2/5	N/A

The game received "average" reviews on all platforms according to the review aggregation website Metacritic. NextGen said that the Xbox version "looks quite nice, and it's by no means bad, but it falls far short of its intriguing potential." GamePro, however, said that the PlayStation 2 version "puts a new twist on an otherwise-overdone genre: mission-based action on a snowboard. Despite this unique premise, Dark Summit sadly fails in every category." (Note: GamePro gave the PlayStation 2 version three 2/5 scores for graphics, sound, and fun factor, and 3/5 for control.)

The Badger of GameZone gave the Xbox version 7.5 out of 10, calling it "a recommended rental due to the fact that while it does add some new concepts to the genre, it still may leave you feeling like it wasn't quite geared up for the power of the Xbox." However, Nick Valentino gave the PlayStation 2 version 7.8 out of 10, saying, "There is a lot to like about this title even though there are little things that bring it down, but it still a title gamers should definitely check out." Michael Lafferty later gave the GameCube version a similar score of 7.8 out of 10, calling it "a solid action game. It features excellent graphics (aside from the pits of green gunk) and an enjoyable, if somewhat predictable, story. This is a fun title."
