= MTV Sports: Snowboarding =

1999 video game

- Developer: Radical Entertainment
- Publisher: THQ
- Platform: PlayStation
- Release: NA: October 28, 1999; EU: 1999
- Genre: Snowboarding
- Modes: Single-player, multiplayer

MTV Sports: Snowboarding is a snowboarding video game developed by Radical Entertainment and published by THQ for the PlayStation in 1999.

== Gameplay ==
MTV Sports: Snowboarding is a snowboarding competition game in which players must pass the training and qualifying rounds to be able to move on to the main competition.

== Reception ==
Reception

Aggregate score
Aggregator	Score
GameRankings	71%

Review scores
Publication	Score
AllGame	4.5/5
CNET Gamecenter	6/10
Electronic Gaming Monthly	6.33/10
GamePro	(DPD) 4/5 (Enq.) 3.5/5
GameSpot	8.4/10
IGN	6.8/10
Next Generation	4/5
Official U.S. PlayStation Magazine	3.5/5
The Sydney Morning Herald	3/5

The game received "average" reviews according to the review aggregation website GameRankings. Adam Pavlacka of NextGen said, "If you've tired of the Cool Boarders series and are seeking a new challenge, look no further. The next great snowboarding game has arrived on PlayStation."
