= X Games Pro Boarder =

1998 video game

ESPN X Games Pro Boarder
- Developer: Radical Entertainment
- Publisher: Electronic Arts: EU: Sony Computer Entertainment (PS1)
- Platforms: PlayStation, Microsoft Windows
- Release: PlayStation: NA: November 10, 1998; EU: 1998; Windows: NA: November 23, 1998; EU: 1998
- Genre: Snowboarding
- Modes: Single-player, multiplayer

ESPN X-Games Pro Boarder, also known as X Games Pro Boarder, is a 1998 snowboarding video game developed by Radical Entertainment and published by Electronic Arts for the PlayStation and Windows.

== Reception ==
Reception

Aggregate score
Aggregator	Score	
Aggregator	PC	PS
GameRankings	70%	70%

Review scores
Publication	Score	
Publication	PC	PS
CNET Gamecenter	7/10	4/10
Electronic Gaming Monthly	N/A	5.5/10 (Note: in Electronic Gaming Monthly's review of the PlayStation version, one critic gave it 5.5/10, two others gave it each a score of 5/10, and another gave it 6.5/10.)
EP Daily	6/10	N/A
Famitsu	N/A	28/40
Game Informer	N/A	6.5/10
GameFan	N/A	85% (Note: In GameFan's viewpoint of the PlayStation version, one critic gave it 86, and the other 84.)
GameRevolution	N/A	D+
GameSpot	N/A	8.7/10
IGN	7.8/10	7/10
Next Generation	N/A	2/5
Official U.S. PlayStation Magazine	N/A	4/5
PC Accelerator	6/10	N/A
PC Gamer (UK)	69%	N/A

The game received average reviews on both platforms according to the review aggregation website GameRankings. GameSpot gave the PlayStation version a favorable review, over a month before its U.S. release date. However, Next Generation said of the same console version, "In the end, its style-over-substance, mediocre gameplay is what you'll remember the most." In Japan, where the same console version was ported and published by Electronic Arts Square, also under the name X-Games Pro Boarder (X GAMES プロボーダー, Ekkusu Gēmuzu Puro Bōdā), on March 11, 1999, Famitsu gave it a score of 28 out of 40. GamePro said that the PlayStation version "enters the PlayStation snowboarding foray to carve a piece out of Cool Boarders' mountain. But X Games Pro Boarder doesn't have the kick to knock CB off the slopes." (Note: GamePro gave the PlayStation version all four 3.5/5 scores for graphics, sound, control, and fun factor.)
