= Mountain Bike Rally =

1994 video game

- Cover art of Mountain Bike Rally
- Developer: Radical Entertainment
- Publishers: ASC Games; Life Fitness (exercise bike version)
- Designers: Phillip Tse; Chris Robertson; Mark Slemko; Paul Wilkinson; Martin Sikes; Rory Armes
- Platform: Super NES
- Release: NA: October 1994; NA: November 1994 (Cannondale Cup version)
- Genre: Bicycle racing game
- Mode: Single-player

Mountain Bike Rally, also released as Cannondale Cup in North America, is a bicycle racing video game developed by Radical Entertainment and published by ASC Games for the Super Nintendo Entertainment System in 1994. The game is a simulation of real mountain biking in which the player can select between many characters and many mountain bikes ranging from mediocre to excellent in many categories. It was the first game to support the Life Fitness Entertainment System, an exercise bike peripheral for the SNES. The Cannondale Cup release has the same graphics as the Mountain Bike Rally release, but the names of the racers, bikes, and locations were all altered.

== Gameplay ==
The player starts in qualifying, and can eventually qualify for the regionals, nationals, the championship, and the final race, in which they must get first place in order to beat the game.

There are a selection of cyclists, including a demon, a California surfer, and a ninja. Each character has a different catchphrase for winning, being in first, being in second, being in third, and everything in between. The only violence in this game comes from the onlookers who throw objects at the bikers to cause damage. Even after being hit several times, the bike is never destroyed. Finding a repair bonus on the track can fix the damage and make the bicycle run faster again. There are also bonuses on the track for points and energy, which gives the player more strength to push the bicycle to the limits.

== Reception ==
GamePro gave the game a generally positive review, saying it "mixes racing realism and surrealism." They criticized the lack of digitized voices but praised the Mode 7 effects, airborne animations, numerous options, and good controls.
