= NHL All-Star Hockey (Sega Saturn game) =

1995 video game

- North American cover art
- Developer: Gray Matter
- Publisher: Sega
- Producers: Chris Cutliff; Michael Meischeid
- Designers: Adam Mock; Tom Papadatos
- Programmer: Eric Randall
- Artists: Carolyn Cudmore; Mike D'Agnillo; Michael Upton
- Writer: Erica Riggs
- Composer: Mark Kerr
- Platform: Sega Saturn
- Release: NA: 1995; EU: November 1995
- Genre: Sports
- Modes: Single-player, multiplayer

NHL All-Star Hockey is a video game developed by Gray Matter and published by Sega for the Sega Saturn. It was followed by NHL All-Star Hockey 98, which was a rebranded version of NHL Powerplay 98.

== Gameplay ==
NHL All-Star Hockey is an ice hockey simulation featuring three-dimensional rinks and sprite-based players. Matches can be viewed from multiple camera angles, including overhead, behind-the-goal and spectator perspectives. The game includes an action-replay system allowing players to review sequences in slow motion, advance through footage frame by frame and change the viewing angle. Up to twelve players can participate simultaneously using two six-player multitap adapters. The game also features league competition and player profiles containing statistics and trading-card-style portraits.

== Reception ==
Next Generation reviewed the game, rating it two stars out of five, and stated that "NHL All-Star Hockey isn't the worst hockey game ever, it's just the most disappointing."

European assessments were mixed. British magazine Sega Saturn Magazine awarded the game 78%, praising its visual presentation and generally solid gameplay, although it considered the overall experience unexceptional. French magazine Consoles + was considerably more enthusiastic, awarding 93% and praising its extensive features, presentation and animations, while noting occasional graphical shortcomings and problematic camera angles. German publication MAN!AC awarded 57%, commending the multiplayer options and additional features but criticising the pixelated three-dimensional graphics and average playability. In Spain, Hobby Consolas praised the game's presentation, variety of modes and sound, but criticised the responsiveness of the controls, particularly when passing and shooting.

== In popular culture ==
NHL All-Star Hockey appears in the 1995 comedy film Mallrats, in which Brodie Bruce (Jason Lee) is shown playing the game on the Sega Saturn. Director Kevin Smith stated that the scene was originally filmed using NHL '94, but the game was replaced following an agreement between Universal Pictures and Sega. Smith expressed disappointment with the change, having preferred the original game.
