= Radical Entertainment =

Canadian video game developer

Activision Vancouver
- Formerly: Radical Entertainment (1991–2022) (Note: Entity Radical Entertainment Inc. officially dissolved in December 15, 2013. Formerly registered as Vivendi Universal Games Canada Ltd. (2005–2006) and as Vivendi Games Canada, Ltd. (2006–2007))
- Type: Subsidiary
- Industry: Video games
- Founded: September 1991; 35 years ago
- Founders: Rory Armes; Dave Davis; Ian Wilkinson
- Headquarters: Vancouver, Canada
- Products: The Simpsons (2001–2003); Hulk (2003–2005); Crash Bandicoot (2005–2008); Scarface: The World Is Yours (2006); Prototype (2009–2012)
- Parent: Vivendi Games (2005–2008); Activision (2008–present)

Radical Entertainment Inc., later known as Activision Vancouver, is a Canadian video game developer based in Vancouver. The studio is best known for developing The Simpsons: Hit & Run (2003), Scarface: The World Is Yours (2006), Prototype (2009) and Prototype 2 (2012), as well as entries in the Crash Bandicoot franchise. Radical Entertainment was founded in September 1991 by Rory Armes, Dave Davis, and Ian Wilkinson. It was acquired by Vivendi Games in 2005 and transferred to Activision in 2008. The studio faced significant layoffs in 2010 and 2012, with the latter causing it to cease development of original games and only support other Activision studios.

== History ==
=== 1991–2000: Origin and early history ===
Former Radical Entertainment logo used from 1991 to 1999.

Radical Entertainment co-founders Ian Wilkinson and Rory Armes previously worked for Distinctive Software during the late 1980s. When Distinctive Software was acquired by Electronic Arts in 1991, Wilkinson and Armes took the opportunity to form their own company. Radical Entertainment was established in September 1991 in the Yaletown district of Vancouver. The studio primarily developed Nintendo Entertainment System ports and adaptations of other video games, peaking at eight projects in 1994.

Mike Ribero left his position as Sega of America's vice president of sales and marketing to become CEO of Radical Entertainment in 1996. Following the 1996 release of The Divide: Enemies Within, programmer Alex Garden and composer Paul Ruskay would leave Radical Entertainment to respectively establish the game developer Relic Entertainment and the audio facility Studio Labs X. In 1997, the company expanded by launching a San Francisco office that was used for game production and development of new titles, which was at one point, being America's largest video game developer, this was closed on September 25, 1998. More employees left Radical to start out Barking Dog Studios in 1998.

In May 1998, the company announced a partnership with The Walt Disney Company and ESPN to launch ESPN Digital Games, a new line of video sports games. Under this agreement, Radical would develop, publish, and market the games worldwide, with Buena Vista Home Entertainment handling North American distribution. In October 1998, Electronic Arts acquired one of these titles, X Games Pro Boarder, from Disney Interactive. The company hit a series of mass layoffs on October 20, 1998, which was called "Black Tuesday", a move often compared to the past layoffs of Park Place Productions in 1993 and Malibu Interactive in 1994. Paul Tremblay and other employees founded Black Box Games after Black Tuesday, which developed its first title NHL 2K in 2000. MTV Sports: Pure Ride, a snowboarding game published by THQ, was released on September 28, 2000.

=== 2001–2005: Mainstream success ===
On 11 May 2001, Radical Entertainment and SPY Wireless Media announced an agreement to develop a wireless content management solution enabling SPY's partners and customers to develop new revenue and promotional opportunities by delivering interactive services to the youth market using wireless devices such as cell phones. At E3 2001, Radical Entertainment unveiled The Simpsons: Road Rage, a story-based driving game based on the popular animated series The Simpsons and co-published by Electronic Arts and Fox Interactive, as well as Dark Summit, another THQ-published snowboarding game unique in its action-adventure elements. On 15 August 2001, Radical Entertainment announced the development of a demo application and white paper for Nintendo's upcoming GameCube console. The demo utilized key features of Radical's proprietary Pure3D game engine, while the accompanying white paper provided information on Radical's technical expertise to other game companies. Dark Summit and The Simpsons: Road Rage were released in November 2001. The Simpsons: Road Rage was one of the top ten most rented titles of December 2001 in North America, generating over $500,000 in rental fees for video and game rental outlets in a single week.

In 2003, Radical Entertainment opened a development division, 369 Interactive, which was set to develop multiple titles based on the CSI franchise, in partnership with Ubi Soft.

=== 2005–2008: Acquisition by Vivendi Universal ===
Although Radical Entertainment developed few titles for Vivendi Universal Entertainment, the titles gained massive success and warranted the company's interest in the developers. In 2004, the company signed an exclusive deal with Vivendi Universal Games to develop new properties and adaptations of existing VU franchises. In 2005, Vivendi acquired Radical Entertainment; however, as described by a former developer at Radical, the mood did not change much and Radical still operated as an independent game developing company. Several former Radical Entertainment employees formed independent studios thereafter, including Vlad Ceraldi, Joel DeYoung, and Steve Bocska, who established Hothead Games in 2006. Wilkinson also left the studio around this time and joined Hothead Games as president and chief executive officer (CEO) in March 2009, replacing Ceraldi. After being acquired by Vivendi, Radical began to make many games such as Scarface: The World Is Yours and The Incredible Hulk: Ultimate Destruction while being published under Vivendi's Sierra Entertainment label. Radical was also given the license to continue development of the Crash Bandicoot franchise which was also published under Sierra Entertainment. Radical took over the development of Crash Tag Team Racing from Traveller's Tales. Due to the success of Crash Tag Team Racing, Radical started the development of Crash of the Titans and proclaimed that "Crash was home at Radical" stating that Radical would develop all further Crash games. The critical and commercial success of Crash of the Titans spawned one more sequel, Crash: Mind over Mutant, which managed to both critically beat its predecessor as well as commercially. During the development of Crash: Mind over Mutant, Radical began working on Prototype.

=== 2008–2022: Acquisition by Activision, Prototype games, and layoffs ===
When Vivendi Games merged with Activision to form Activision Blizzard in 2008, Vivendi's former studios, including Radical Entertainment, became part of Activision. At the time, Radical Entertainment was developing four games, including Crash: Mind over Mutant and Prototype. Activision laid off around 100 people, half of the studio's staff, and canceled the two unannounced projects. One of these was Treadstone, a game set in the Jason Bourne universe. Activision was not interested in the property and sold it back to Ludlum Entertainment, which subsequently licensed it to Electronic Arts.

In February 2010, Activision laid off around 200 developers from its studios, including roughly 90 at Radical Entertainment, equating to half of the studio's workforce at the time. A sequel to Prototype, Prototype 2, was released in April 2012. In the United States, it was the best-selling game of its release month. However, Activision considered the game a commercial failure; on 28 June 2012, the company announced a "significant reduction in staff" at Radical Entertainment that would see the studio cease development of its own games and only support other Activision studios going forward. While some reports, including that of former Radical Entertainment senior audio director Rob Bridgett, indicated that the studio had closed, Activision stated that it would remain open with the reduced staff. Activision and Radical Entertainment re-iterated this statement in September that year. The Microsoft Windows port of Prototype 2 was released in July 2012. On 15 December 2013, Radical Entertainment's incorporated status was dissolved by the Canadian government for non-compliance under section 212 of the Canadian Business Corporations Act. Its most recent credited development role is the PlayStation 4 and Xbox One ports of Prototype and Prototype 2, released in 2015. Radical Entertainment was among the studios named in Microsoft's 2022 acquisition of Activision's parent company Activision Blizzard. Despite this, all that was left of Radical Entertainment was a team of 6 employees, whose subsequent work would be credited under Activision Vancouver.

In December 2024, following the shutdown of Hothead Games, Wilkinson and Tim Bennison, Hothead Games's former chief operating officer (COO), founded New Radical Games, again assuming the roles of president, CEO and COO, respectively.

== Organization ==
Radical Entertainment practiced open and regular communication between management and employees; the company's president sent an e-mail to all staff on a bi-weekly basis, and staff input on all company facets was sought, ranging from what technologies to adopt to what food was stocked in the kitchen. In addition, the chief financial officer conducted a quarterly seminar to present the company's financial performance, allowing employees to understand where the company was making and spending its revenues. The company also implemented progressive human resource management practices such as core hours, providing a salary top-up to 3-months full pay for maternity leave, and utilizing an intellectual property review process to generate new ideas from among employees. This review process, named the "Idea Review Senate", was conducted by a team of nine employees headed by creative director Stephen Van Der Mescht. Ideas that were not recommended for development were passed back to the employee, who retained all rights to the property and could develop it independently or sell it to another company.

Radical Entertainment maintained an in-house research and development team directed by Dave Forsey. In September 1998, the team completed an Industrial Research Assistance Program assignment funded by a $350,000 federal grant. The project entailed several technological advances involving arbitrary topology on hierarchical surfaces, including the development of hierarchical splines in 3D Studio MAX and Autodesk Maya. This development allowed for the creation of localized detail on animated characters, and the release of the commercial graphics software Rodin based on this work. In March 2000, the team received a renewable $200,000 BC Science Council grant for the development of an internal game engine library and associated tools to streamline library pipelines. In 2001, Forsey and two of his colleagues in the company were recruited by the University of Calgary to develop and teach an undergraduate-level course in video game programming. The course, considered the first of its kind, was aimed at final-year computer science students and tasked them with designing and implementing a video game prototype. In the fall of 2001, several other employees taught a similar class at the University of British Columbia as a response to an impending labour crisis in Canada.

== Accolades ==
On 13 December 2000, the National Post named Radical Entertainment one of Canada's top 50 best managed private companies, a distinction granted to private Canadian companies with over $5 million in revenue and which have demonstrated strong growth in the past three years. On 5 October 2001, the company's president and CEO Ian Wilkinson received Ernst & Young's 2001 Media and Entertainment Entrepreneur of the Year.

== Games developed ==
Year	Title	Publisher	Platform(s)	Ref.
1992	The Adventures of Rocky and Bullwinkle and Friends	THQ	Nintendo Entertainment System	
1992	The Terminator	Mindscape	Nintendo Entertainment System	
1993	The Battle of Olympus	Broderbund	Game Boy	
1993	Mario Is Missing!	The Software Toolworks	Nintendo Entertainment System	
1993	Wayne's World	THQ	Game Boy, Nintendo Entertainment System	
1993	Pelé!	Accolade	Sega Genesis	
1994	Brett Hull Hockey	Accolade	Super Nintendo Entertainment System	
1994	Bebe's Kids	Motown Software	Super Nintendo Entertainment System	
1994	Mario's Time Machine	The Software Toolworks	Nintendo Entertainment System	
1994	Pelé II: World Tournament Soccer	Accolade	Sega Genesis	
1994	Mountain Bike Rally	ASC Games	Super Nintendo Entertainment System	
1994	Al Unser Jr.'s Road to the Top	The Software Toolworks	Super Nintendo Entertainment System	
1994	Beavis and Butt-Head	Viacom New Media	Sega Genesis	
1994	Speed Racer in My Most Dangerous Adventures	Accolade	Super Nintendo Entertainment System	
1995	Brett Hull Hockey '95	Accolade	Sega Genesis, Super Nintendo Entertainment System	
1996	The Divide: Enemies Within	Viacom New Media	Microsoft Windows, PlayStation	
1996	Power Piggs of the Dark Age	Titus Software	Super Nintendo Entertainment System	
1996	NHL Powerplay '96	Virgin Interactive	Microsoft Windows, PlayStation, Sega Saturn	
1996	Grid Runner	Virgin Interactive	Microsoft Windows, PlayStation, Sega Saturn	
1997	Independence Day	Fox Interactive	Microsoft Windows, PlayStation, Sega Saturn	
1997	NHL Powerplay 98 / NHL All-Star Hockey 98	Virgin Interactive / Sega	Microsoft Windows, PlayStation, Sega Saturn	
1998	X Games Pro Boarder	Electronic Arts	Microsoft Windows, PlayStation	
1999	Blood Lines	Sony Computer Entertainment Europe	PlayStation	
1999	MTV Sports: Snowboarding	THQ	PlayStation	
1999	NBA Basketball 2000	Fox Interactive	Microsoft Windows, PlayStation	
1999	NHL Championship 2000	Fox Interactive	Microsoft Windows, PlayStation	
2000	Jackie Chan Stuntmaster	Midway Games	PlayStation	
2000	MTV Sports: Pure Ride	THQ	PlayStation	
2001	Dark Summit	THQ	GameCube, PlayStation 2, Xbox	
2001	The Simpsons: Road Rage	Electronic Arts	GameCube, PlayStation 2, Xbox	
2002	Tetris Worlds	THQ	GameCube, Xbox	
2002	Monsters, Inc. Scream Arena	THQ	GameCube	
2002	James Cameron's Dark Angel	Sierra Entertainment	PlayStation 2, Xbox	
2003	CSI: Crime Scene Investigation	Ubi Soft	Microsoft Windows, Xbox	
2003	Hulk	Vivendi Universal Games	Microsoft Windows, GameCube, PlayStation 2, Xbox	
2003	The Simpsons: Hit & Run	Vivendi Universal Games	Microsoft Windows, GameCube, PlayStation 2, Xbox	
2004	CSI: Dark Motives	Ubi Soft	Microsoft Windows	
2004	CSI: Miami	Ubi Soft	Microsoft Windows	
2005	The Incredible Hulk: Ultimate Destruction	Vivendi Universal Games	GameCube, PlayStation 2, Xbox	
2005	Crash Tag Team Racing	Vivendi Universal Games	GameCube, PlayStation 2, Xbox, PlayStation Portable	
2006	Scarface: The World Is Yours	Vivendi Games	Microsoft Windows, PlayStation 2, Wii, Xbox	
2007	Crash of the Titans	Vivendi Games	PlayStation 2, Wii, Xbox 360	
2008	Crash: Mind over Mutant	Activision	PlayStation 2, Wii, Xbox 360	
2009	Prototype	Activision	Microsoft Windows, PlayStation 3, Xbox 360	
2012	Prototype 2	Activision	Microsoft Windows, PlayStation 3, Xbox 360	
2014	Destiny (as a support team for Bungie)	Activision	Xbox 360, Xbox One, PlayStation 3, PlayStation 4	

=== Canceled games ===
Year	Title	Platform(s)
1994	Brett Hull Hockey	Sega Genesis
1995	RHI Roller Hockey '95	Super Nintendo Entertainment System
2001	A.I. The Circuit or A.I. Gladiator	Xbox
2006	Scarface: The World Is Yours	Xbox 360
~2007	The Simpsons: Hit & Run 2	Unknown
2008	Scarface 2	Unknown
2008	Treadstone	Unknown
2010	I Am Crash Bandicoot, Crash 2010 or Crash Landed	PlayStation 3, Wii, Xbox 360
2011	Spider-Man 4	PlayStation 3, Xbox 360
2012	Prototype 3	PlayStation 3, Xbox 360
