= Prototype (video game) =

2009 video game

- Cover art depicting protagonist Alex Mercer
- Developer: Radical Entertainment
- Publisher: Activision
- Director: Lindsey Williamson-Christy
- Producer: Tim Bennison
- Designer: Eric Holmes
- Programmer: Neall Verheyde
- Artists: Martin Bae; Maurice Kimball; Chris Hassell
- Writers: Dennis Detwiller; Paul Jenkins
- Composers: Cris Velasco; Sascha Dikiciyan
- Platforms: Windows; PlayStation 3; Xbox 360; PlayStation 4; Xbox One
- Release: Microsoft Windows, PlayStation 3, Xbox 360: NA: June 9, 2009; AU: June 10, 2009; EU: June 12, 2009; PlayStation 4: NA: August 11, 2015; PAL: August 19, 2015; Xbox One: WW: August 12, 2015
- Genre: Action-adventure
- Mode: Single-player

Prototype (stylized as [PROTOTYPE]) is a 2009 action-adventure video game developed by Radical Entertainment and published by Activision. It was released in June 2009 for the PlayStation 3, Xbox 360, and Microsoft Windows. In July 2015, the game was re-released alongside its sequel as the Prototype Biohazard Bundle for the PlayStation 4 and Xbox One. Separate versions of the two games became available in August 2015. In Prototype, players control an amnesiac shapeshifter named Alex Mercer as he attempts to stop an outbreak of a virus called Blacklight in Manhattan, which mutates individuals into powerful, violent monsters. Alex also attempts to uncover his mysterious past while coming into conflict with both the US military and a black operations force called Blackwatch. Outside of the main story, players can freely explore the game's open world and engage in several different side activities.

The game was well received by critics following its release, gaining praise for its originality, storytelling, and engaging gameplay, while being criticized for its control scheme and scenery. Several reviewers compared and contrasted it with Infamous, a game released about a month prior which had many elements similar to Prototype. It was also a commercial success, selling 2.1 million copies by March 2012. A tie-in comic book miniseries, which serves as a prequel to the events of the game, was published by DC Comics. A sequel, Prototype 2, was released in April 2012.

== Gameplay ==
Prototype is an action-adventure game played from a third-person perspective and set in an open world based on modern-day Manhattan. The game's setting remains mostly faithful to the real city and includes all of its famous landmarks, including the Empire State Building, the Chrysler Building, 40 Wall Street, 28 Liberty Street, the Conde Nast Building, the Metlife Building, One New York Plaza, and the New York Life Building, among others.

The player character, Alex Mercer, has the ability to shapeshift, allowing him to change his body to resemble anyone. His powers also play into the game's combat system, as Alex can "consume" others to regain health, absorbing their biomass entirely. This also allows him to take on the forms of the human enemies he absorbs, thereby allowing the player to move about the enemy as one of them. The disguise will only last as long as Alex remains inconspicuous. Alex also possesses superhuman strength, and will kill most humans with a single punch. He can perform various melee attacks without shapeshifting, as well as more gymnastic moves such as air combos, sliding along the ground using any humanoid enemy's body, and a high-speed rolling cannonball attack.

Alex can also transform parts of his body into a selection of martial implements acquired over the course of the game, either as purchased upgrades or being given them. Offensive powers include the large and powerful Blade arm, fast razor-sharp Claws (which can also erupt large spikes from the ground), the telescoping Whipfist, Musclemass that augments his strength, and the slow but powerful Hammerfists. Defensive options consist of a large shield on Alex's left arm for blocking ballistic attacks that needs to regenerate after excessive damage, and full body armor that exchanges agility and speed for toughness in hand-to-hand combat; both will allow Alex to plow through most obstacles when active. Vision modes include thermal vision, which allows Alex to see enemies through smoke and other obstacles at the expense of a decreased vision range, and Infected vision, which highlights those infected with the Blacklight virus as well as military units. Both vision modes muffle all of Alex's other senses, such as hearing, in order to concentrate on his sight. One defensive and offensive power may be active at a time, and using either will negate Alex's current disguise. In addition to his own abilities, Alex can take the weapons from defeated or absorbed enemies. These include automatic rifles, machine guns, grenade launchers and missile launchers. He can also seize control of military vehicles, such as tanks and helicopters.

Alex's most powerful attacks are the Devastators, which require Alex to be in Critical Mass- either a state of near-death or the exact opposite, having excess stored biomass and increased health. These include the Tendril Barrage, which fires impaling tendrils from his body in all directions, the Groundspike Graveyard, which erupts massive spikes from the ground all around Alex, and the Critical Pain, which fires a single beam of hardened biomass from his hands to severely damage a single target.

For movement around the city, Alex uses his increased physical abilities. When sprinting, he will automatically hop over cars, barriers and other obstacles without losing momentum. Alex will also scale any wall he comes into contact with and simply knock aside any humanoids that get in his way without stopping. He can jump great heights and distances, enough to clear five-story buildings, and can sprint at extreme speed indefinitely. Falls cause no damage to the player even from the greatest heights. Even small jumps are enough for Alex to dent the ground beneath him, and falls from sufficient heights will create shockwaves at the point of impact which will kill most humans nearby and send objects as large as cars flying. Falling height also factors into several of Alex's melee attacks.

Enemies in the game consist of the Infected and the Military. The Infected consist of ordinary civilians infected with the Blacklight virus that are generally not a threat to Alex. However, the Hunters, huge creatures created from Infected water towers, are one of the main enemies in the game. Evolved Hunters referred to as Leaders are one of the most powerful creatures in the game and are incredibly hard for Alex to kill. The Military consist of ordinary soldiers which are usually not a major threat, but they are capable of operating weaponry that is extremely dangerous to Alex, such as tanks and heavily armed helicopters. The Military also consists of Blackwatch, an agency dedicated to combating biological and nuclear warfare. Blackwatch is one of the intricate parts of the game's story and create some of the deadliest biological weaponry to combat Alex, including viral detectors capable of detecting Alex even in his disguise, and, introduced later in the game, the deadly poison Bloodtox, capable of slowly killing Alex and the Infected. Introduced later in the game are heavily armored and durable soldiers referred to as Super Soldiers, capable of fighting against Alex and some of the strongest Infected.

In order to gain more advanced upgrades, Alex is capable of sneaking into Military Bases using a disguise and stealthily consuming various officials within the base. He can also set off an alert within the base, in which the only way to escape is to slaughter whoever is in the base. Alex can also gain upgrades from the Infected by collecting genetic data. Infected Hives, like Military Bases, are located all over the city, and produce genetic data constantly. Alex can destroy the Infected Hives or simply absorb the data on the outside as it is being produced. At the start of the game, only small factions of the Infected and Military are present in the city. However, as the game progresses, the Military and the Infected begin to expand. Territory in the city is made out of three distinct zones. Blue Zones are in Military control and are relatively clean of the Infection. Red Zones thrive with the Infection, although there still remains a strong Military presence. In some areas of the city, a Blue Zone and a Red Zone might converge, creating a new and distinct Purple Zone. In these Zones, the Military and the Infected are in a constant battle for control. How the player decides to act in these Zones determine which faction seizes the territory.

== Synopsis ==
=== Characters ===
The game's protagonist is Alexander J. "Alex" Mercer (voiced by Barry Pepper), a shapeshifter suffering from amnesia, causing him to forget his previous life, including how he obtained his powers. As he attempts to uncover his past and stop an outbreak of a virus called Blacklight, which has overrun Manhattan, Alex comes into conflict with two factions: the United States Marine Corps and Blackwatch, a Fort Detrick special forces unit dedicated to combating biological warfare; and the Infected, people infected by the Blacklight virus, which turns them into violent monsters. The main antagonist is Robert Cross (Jeff Pierce), also known by his codename, "The Specialist", a Blackwatch officer tasked with containing Alex.

Supporting characters include Alex's sister Dana Mercer (Lake Bell); Dr. Bradley Ragland (Phil LaMarr), who helps Alex throughout the game; Alex's ex-girlfriend Karen Parker (Vanessa Marshall); Dr. Raymond McMullen (Paul Guilfoyle), founder and head researcher of bio-research company Gentek; General Peter Randall (Gordon Clapp), the head of Blackwatch; Randall's second-in-command, Ian Taggart (Richard McGonagle); and Elizabeth Greene (Kari Wahlgren), also known as "The Mother", a former test subject that hosts the Blacklight virus. Brian Bloom has a minor role as a Blackwatch commander whose appearance Alex assumes at one point. Additional characters are voiced by Dave Fennoy, Dave Wittenberg, David Andriole, David Lodge, and Diane Hsu.

=== Plot ===
Alex Mercer awakens with no memory of who he is in a morgue belonging to Gentek, a genetic engineering company in Manhattan, where he escapes and witnesses scientists being killed by military operatives. After surviving being shot, Alex leaps over a wall, soon discovering his superhuman abilities; including shapeshifting, superhuman strength, speed, and creating weapons from his body; as well "consuming" others to gain their memories, skills and appearance. Amnesiac, Alex seeks to find and consume those related to the conspiracy to uncover his past. This puts him against the US Military and Blackwatch, a black ops unit attempting to contain the Blacklight virus overrunning Manhattan.

Alex finds his sister, Dana, who assists him in tracking down targets, leading him to Gentek headquarters. There Alex encounters a young woman called Elizabeth Greene contained in the building, and a host for Blacklight. Upon her escape, Greene unleashes Blacklight upon Manhattan. Dana directs Alex to Karen Parker, his ex-girlfriend, who agrees to help stop the outbreak, having him find samples of the virus. However, Karen later leads Alex into a trap, where he is confronted by Blacklight commander Robert Cross. Alex nearly kills him, when Cross mentions 'Penn Station', triggering a flashback that leaves Alex dazed, before being injected with a parasite that threatens to kill him. Seeking help, Alex finds Dr. Bradely Ragland, a Gentek connected pathologist who removes the parasite, turning it into a weapon against Greene. However, when Alex tries using it on her, Greene's body rejects the parasite, which transforms into a monstrous being: the Supreme Hunter. After seemingly killing the Supreme Hunter, Alex finds and kills Karen out of revenge.

Reaching a contact, Alex discovers the origins of Blacklight and Greene are revealed: in 1969 the government tested the virus' predecessor in Hope, Idaho, to target predetermined races. The town became infected, to no ill effect before Greene's infection. An anomaly in her biology accepted the virus, rewriting her genetic code, allowing her to control the infected. Hope's entire population was liquidated by Blackwatch, with only Greene and her son – codenamed "Pariah" – surviving. Both were kept in captivity for further research. With samples taken from Greene's blood, Gentek's team led by Alex synthesized the current Blacklight strain.

Through this, Alex's past is finally discovered; Blackwatch shut down the Gentek due to leaks, having all project personnel eliminated. Alex escaped and stole a sample of Blacklight as "insurance". When cornered by Blackwatch in Penn Station, Alex spitefully shattered the vial releasing Blacklight before being gunned down. The virus entered Alex's bloodstream through his wounds, repairing his body at the cellular level, granting his powers in the process. The contact and Alex pump a new "Bloodtox" biological agent underground, driving the virus above ground to be fought directly. Greene awakens encased in a towering monstrosity. Separating the two, Alex consumes Greene and learns that General Randall, head of Blackwatch, is prepared to destroy Manhattan with a nuclear weapon.

Alex, with the help of the contact – revealed to be Cross –, infiltrates the USS Ronald Reagan, where Alex consumes Randall. Cross turns on Alex, and is revealed to be the surviving Supreme Hunter, which consumed the real Cross and assumed his identity. The Supreme Hunter intends to consume Alex, becoming strong enough to survive the nuclear detonation and start anew. Alex defeats the Supreme Hunter, taking the weapon to the Atlantic Ocean using a helicopter, where it detonates. Seemingly destroyed, Alex’s remains float back to the city and regenerate after consuming a crow.

During the credits, the military are credited for stopping the infection, with the government considering the incident a case of nuclear and biological terrorism. A surviving Alex returns to the city until his work is over. Alex reflects on the truth of his past self; claiming that he has become something less human, but also more.

== Development and release ==
The game was announced by Vivendi Games subsidiary Sierra Entertainment on August 10, 2007, revealing it would release for the Xbox 360 and PlayStation 3 in the summer of 2008. The company revealed more information about the title over the upcoming months, including support for THX's neural 7.1 surround sound, being the first video game to support it, and the reveal of the voice cast in February. On April 8, 2008, Sierra announced the opening of the game's official website . On May 5, 2008, Sierra and Radical announced that the game would be pushed back to 2009.

On July 28, 2008, after the merger of Activision and Vivendi Games to form Activision Blizzard, the company announced that they would only publish five Sierra titles, with Prototype being one of the five titles retained alongside fellow Radical Entertainment title Crash: Mind Over Mutant. On August 14, 2008, Radical laid off some of their staff, which led to a fear that the game would be delayed again.

A Wii version was rumored to be in development, leading Activision to announce in May 2009 that no Wii version of the game was in development.

On April 8, 2009, Activision announced they would release the game on June 5 in Europe, and on June 9 in North America. However, the game's European release was later delayed to June 12.

=== Comic book ===
On April 15, 2008, Sierra announced that a six-issue comic book miniseries would be released by DC Comics under their Wildstorm imprint. The comic book miniseries functions as a prequel to the game, revealing more details about the Blacklight outbreak and characters such as Elizabeth Greene.

== Reception ==
Reception

Aggregate score
Aggregator	Score		
Aggregator	PC	PS3	Xbox 360
Metacritic	79/100	79/100	78/100

Review scores
Publication	Score		
Publication	PC	PS3	Xbox 360
Destructoid	N/A	N/A	7.5/10
Eurogamer	N/A	N/A	7/10
Game Informer	N/A	7.25/10	7.25/10
GamePro	N/A	4.5/5	4.5/5
GameRevolution	N/A	C+	C+
GameSpot	8.5/10	8.5/10	8.5/10
GameSpy	3/5	3/5	3/5
GameTrailers	N/A	N/A	8.6/10
GameZone	9/10	9.4/10	7.8/10
Giant Bomb	N/A	4/5	4/5
IGN	7.5/10	(AU) 8.5/10 (US) 7.5/10	(AU) 8.5/10 (US) 7.5/10
Official Xbox Magazine (US)	N/A	N/A	8.5/10
PC Gamer (UK)	86%	N/A	N/A
PlayStation: The Official Magazine	N/A	4/5	N/A
The A.V. Club	N/A	N/A	A−
The Daily Telegraph	N/A	N/A	8/10

The game received "generally favorable reviews" on all platforms according to the review aggregation website Metacritic. Prototype was released on Steam as well as in retail stores and topped the Steam sales on the week of its release. The Xbox 360 version of Prototype was the top selling game of June 2009 in North America, with over 419,900 units sold. This made the game a Platinum Hit. As of March 2012, the game had sold 2.1 million copies worldwide.

GameSpot praised the game for its "intriguing storyline and protagonist" and "massive arsenal of moves and abilities", but criticized it for its "occasionally fiddly controls" and "dull scenery". The Escapist said the Xbox 360 version was a perfect "summer fling," praising the combat and movement systems as well as the unique mechanic of the Web of Intrigue. The A.V. Club gave the same console version an "A−" ranking, calling the movement style "exhilarating" and saying it was a "mature, science-fiction superhero fantasy that somehow makes players feel simultaneously powerful and vulnerable." 411Mania gave it a score of eight out of ten and called it "an entirely different type of sandbox game that will attract and please most gamers." The Daily Telegraph gave it a similar score of eight out of ten and said it "offers an action-filled experience that few games can match, and the array of attacks on offer is almost unparalleled in both its variety and its easy accessibility. The pure adrenaline-boosting entertainment value of the finished product is enough to push most visual and gameplay niggles far enough into the background so as to eradicate them as concerns in all but the most snobbish of gamers." Edge also gave it a score of eight out of ten, saying that the game "does what it does, and does it with distinction." However, Teletext GameCentral gave it five out of ten, concluding, "The initial feelings of power and freedom hide another badly designed and unimaginative superhero sim." Though it never received an official copy in Japan, Famitsu praised the gameplay and visual effects.

Prototype was released two weeks after Sucker Punch Productions' Infamous, a game with many similar concepts including a character with superpowers, and a large open world environment that can be traveled by climbing up buildings and gliding about the city. This led many game critics to compare and contrast the games. In his Zero Punctuation review of Prototype, Ben "Yahtzee" Croshaw compared the two games point for point, and determined that he could not tell which was the better game - Prototype won on open world gameplay and combat, while Infamous won on story and side missions. To decide which one was better, he jokingly stated that he'd award the best game to the team which created the best picture of the other main character wearing "a woman's bra". To his surprise, both development teams rose to the challenge, producing said images, and forcing Croshaw to call it a near-tie, edging out in favor of Infamous, though he still noted that, like their games, both images created independently were nearly equal in the themes that they included. A review on GameSpot.com says: "[Mercer is an] incredibly fun character to play as in a game that also counts an intriguing story, varied missions, and some memorable boss battles among its features."

During the 13th Annual Interactive Achievement Awards, the Academy of Interactive Arts & Sciences nominated Prototype for "Action Game of the Year".

== Sequel ==
A sequel, titled Prototype 2, was released in April 2012 for the PlayStation 3 and Xbox 360, and in July 2012 for Windows. The game follows a new protagonist, former U.S. Marine Sergeant James Heller, as he pursues vengeance on Alex Mercer, who serves as the main antagonist.
