= Brett Hull Hockey '95 =

1995 video game

- Super NES cover art
- Developers: Radical Entertainment (Genesis, SNES); Accolade (MS-DOS)
- Publishers: NA: Accolade; EU: Warner Interactive Entertainment Europe (MS-DOS)
- Designers: Brian Carpenter; Emmanuel Lopez; Dave Roberts; Chris Robertson
- Artists: Mike Jackson; Arthur We
- Composer: Paul Wilkinson
- Series: Brett Hull Hockey
- Platforms: Genesis, Super NES, MS-DOS
- Release: Genesis: NA: December 1994; Super NES: NA: January 1995
- Genre: Sports
- Modes: Single-player, multiplayer

Brett Hull Hockey '95 is an ice hockey sports video game video game released in December 1994 for Genesis, and then, January 1995 for the Super NES and MS-DOS. The game was developed by Radical Entertainment and published by Accolade. It is the sequel to the original Brett Hull Hockey. The gameplay options include Exhibition, Half Season, Full Season, Play-offs and All-Star. Al Michaels calls the play-by-play for every game.

== Gameplay ==
A face-off has been called for St. Louis' defensive zone.

More than 600 authentic hockey players are included. Athletes are rated in skills related to skating, offense, defense, and goaltending skills. The "coach mode" allows players to customize the team in order to meet their gaming needs. There is an NHLPA license in the game but no NHL license; so that teams are only mentioned by city name.

The Super NES version only has a password save method.

== Reception ==
Reception

Review scores
Publication	Score
AllGame	2.5/5 (Sega CD)
Next Generation	2/5 (SNES); 1/5 (GEN)

Reviewing the Super NES version, GamePro praised the coaching feature and assessed that Brett Hull Hockey '95, while not as good a game as NHL Hockey '95, has an action-driven style of gameplay which might be more appealing to beginning players and action fans. Next Generation reviewed the Super NES version, rating it two stars out of five, and stated that "Sure, it's hockey, but Brett Hull Hockey '95 still stands squarely in the minors."

A different GamePro critic gave the Genesis version a negative review, citing grainy voice, "slow game play and slower control", and the game's emphasis on individual plays rather than teamwork. Next Generation reviewed the Genesis version of the game, rating it one star out of five, and stated that "Brett Hull Hockey '95 is one more feeble attempt at capturing the brutal action of NHL Hockey."

Reviewing the computer release of Brett Hull Hockey '95, Computer Game Review offered a largely negative opinion. The magazine's Ted Chapman concluded, "Boooooorrrriiiinnnnng!"
