= NHL Powerplay '96 =

1996 video game

- Developer: Radical Entertainment
- Publisher: Virgin Interactive Entertainment
- Platforms: PlayStation, Sega Saturn, Windows
- Release: 1996
- Genre: Sports - Ice Hockey Sim
- Modes: Single-player, multiplayer

NHL Powerplay '96 is a video game developed by Radical Entertainment and published by Virgin Interactive Entertainment for the PlayStation, Sega Saturn, and Windows.

== Gameplay ==
NHL Powerplay '96 is an NHL ice hockey video game featuring NHL teams and player statistics. The game offers five different modes, including playing through a full season and playoffs. During matches, players can manage their team's line-up, substitute players and select various offensive and defensive strategies. Players can also perform physical checks and knock opponents down.

The game features three-dimensional graphics with motion-captured player animations. The camera system provides different viewing angles, zooming in during face-offs and goalmouth action and pulling back during general play. An instant replay feature also allows players to review the action from different camera positions.

== Reception ==
Next Generation reviewed the Saturn version of the game, rating it five stars out of five, and stated that "Attempts at finding fault in Powerplay's design just provokes knit-picking [sic] more than substantive criticism. The small puck is sometimes hard to pick out on the ice, but then you could say that about real-life hockey. Also, the number of stats the game tracks may be less than what a die-hard hockey fan would demand. But all in all, once the puck hits the ice these minor complaints are quickly forgotten. Sony be warned: NFL Face Off was a great game, but NHL Powerplay '96 is better."

In 1996, Next Generation listed NHL Powerplay as number 40 on their "Top 100 Games of All Time", commenting that, "NHL Powerplay offers all the excitement, ferocity, precision, and strategy of the real thing without the pain."

The Saturn version received positive reviews in Europe. Sega Saturn Magazine reviewer Rob praised the motion-captured player animations, tactical options and statistical depth. He considered the gameplay smoother than Sega's NHL Hockey, although he criticised the limited camera adjustments and suggested that mastering its tactical systems required practice. French magazine Consoles + praised the gameplay, particularly its responsiveness and strategic depth, but considered the Saturn version inferior to the PlayStation release due to its less fluid animation and weaker presentation.

Germany's MAN!AC highlighted the 3D graphics, detailed tactical options and large selection of teams. Italy's Consolemania praised the game's accessibility, fluid animation and responsive controls. The magazine awarded 90 for playability and 89 for longevity, although the reviewer noted occasional difficulties following the action. Spain's Hobby Consolas highlighted the game's representation of NHL hockey, including different shots, passing, physical play, season mode and team selection.

In the October 1996 issue of Computer and Video Games, the Sega Saturn version of NHL Powerplay '96 ranked fifth on the magazine's American multi-format sales chart.
