= Croc: Legend of the Gobbos =

1997 video game

- Developers: Argonaut Software; Titanium Studios (Remaster); Big Boat Interactive (Remaster)
- Publishers: Fox Interactive (Note: ModRetro will publish the Nintendo 64 version.); Argonaut Games (Remaster) (Note: Rock It Games published the limited PlayStation 5 and Nintendo Switch physical release. PM Studios will publish the Nintendo Switch 2, Xbox One and Xbox Series X/S physical releases in North America, and Strictly Limited Games will publish the Switch 2 and PlayStation 5 versions in Europe.)
- Producers: Nick Clarke; Stefano Zammattio; John Edelson
- Designer: Nic Cusworth
- Programmers: Anthony Lloyd; Lewis Gordon
- Composers: Justin Scharvona; Karin Griffin; Martin Gwynn Jones
- Series: Croc
- Engine: BRender (Windows)
- Platforms: Original; PlayStation, Sega Saturn, Windows, Nintendo 64; Remaster; Nintendo Switch, Nintendo Switch 2, PlayStation 4, PlayStation 5, Windows, Xbox One, Xbox Series X/S
- Release: PlayStation, Sega Saturn, Windows: NA: 29 September 1997; EU: 10 October 1997; Nintendo Switch, PlayStation 4, PlayStation 5, Windows, Xbox One, Xbox Series X/S: WW: 2 April 2025; Nintendo Switch 2: WW: 2027; Nintendo 64: WW: 2027
- Genre: Platform
- Mode: Single-player

Croc: Legend of the Gobbos (Note: Known in Japan as Croc! Pau Pau Island (Japanese: クロック!パウパウアイランド, Hepburn: Kurokku! Paupau Airando)) is a 1997 platform game developed by Argonaut Software and published by Fox Interactive. An early example of a 3D platform game, Croc was released for the PlayStation, Sega Saturn and Windows. Taking place in the fictional setting of the Gobbo Valley, Croc: Legend of the Gobbos follows a young crocodile named Croc, who sets out to rescue his adoptive family (a group of furry creatures known as Gobbos) from the evil magician Baron Dante.

The game initially started development shortly following a successful relationship between Argonaut and Nintendo, with the former creating a processing chip for the Super Nintendo Entertainment System called the Super FX that was used in games such as Star Fox to display 3D polygonal environments. It was first pitched to Nintendo as a prototype for a 3D platform game in which the player controlled Yoshi from Nintendo's Super Mario series, but was ultimately rejected by Nintendo, ending the relationship and prompting Argonaut to retool the game as an original property. The game's characters and mechanics were designed by Simon Keating in his first-ever video game project. Justin Scharvona, Karin Griffin, and Martin Gwynn Jones composed the game's music, while Jonathan Aris provided the voice of Croc.

Croc: Legend of the Gobbos received average reviews from critics; praise was directed towards the game's visuals, music and sound, while criticism was directed towards the controls, camera, and lack of innovation. It went on to become one of Argonaut's most successful releases, selling over 3 million copies for the PlayStation. A sequel to the game, titled Croc 2, was released in 1999. A 2D port of the game was developed by Virtucraft and released for Game Boy Color in June 2000, with a sequel developed by Natsume Co., Ltd. released in January 2001. A remastered version of the original game was released for the Nintendo Switch, PlayStation 4, PlayStation 5, Xbox One, Xbox Series X/S and Windows (via GOG.com) on 2 April 2025. A Nintendo Switch 2 port is also planned, alongside a homebrew port of the original game to Nintendo 64 hardware for the M64 system.

== Gameplay ==
A screenshot of the stage "Be Wheely Careful"; stages in the game are made up of several small, connected areas consisting of various puzzles and platforming challenges.

Croc: Legend of the Gobbos is a third-person 3D platformer in which the player controls the main character, a green crocodile named Croc, through several courses taking place on various islands throughout Gobbo Valley. Levels are accessed through a world map, and consist of different smaller sub-sections taking place both above land and underground (as well as occasionally taking place underwater) that are filled with various enemies and obstacles that try to impede Croc.

The main goal of each level is to navigate through the stage and reach the gong located at the end of the level in order to transport Croc to the next, while also saving as many captured Gobbos imprisoned throughout the stage as possible. Certain stages also contain boss enemies known as "Guardians" that Croc must defeat to progress to the next stage. Different collectibles are scattered throughout stages, including small, gray crystal orbs that act as Croc's health, and red hearts that give the player an extra life when collected. Also hidden across each stage are 6 Gobbos being held captive by the Dantini tribe that act as Croc's main objective throughout the length of the game. 5 of these Gobbos are hidden in various locations throughout the level, often collected by solving a puzzle or completing a challenge, whilst the 6th Gobbo is located in a bonus room hidden behind a set of doors that can only be reached by collecting 5 colored crystals hidden throughout the level. Rescuing every Gobbo before a boss level in each world unlocks a secret level that can be completed to collect a jigsaw puzzle piece. Subsequently, collecting every puzzle piece in the game unlocks an extra island containing more levels for the player to progress through. While collecting the Gobbos is not mandatory to completing the game, doing so is nonetheless necessary in order to face off against the game's final boss and unlock the game's true ending.

Croc's maneuvering abilities are somewhat comparable to those of Mario in Super Mario 64, with his primary methods of movement consisting of the abilities to run, jump, climb, and swim using either the analog stick or the D-pad, as well as touting the abilities to perform a sidestep and a 180-degree quick turn as other methods of maneuver. Croc's main method of attack consists of a full-circle tail swipe that is used to defeat enemies and bosses, as well as a hip drop move that can be used to break open crates containing collectibles. Croc's in-game health is represented by the crystals that the player collects throughout the game; when Croc is hurt by an enemy, all of his crystals are lost and scattered around him in several directions (similar to a mechanic commonly used in Sonic the Hedgehog games with Rings). If Croc is hurt while he has no crystals, the player loses a life and is sent back to the beginning of the segment of the level they are currently in.

== Plot ==
King Rufus, the leader of a furry race of creatures called the Gobbos, is watching the sunrise over Gobbo Valley when he sees a large, woven basket carrying a baby crocodile floating down the river. Initially suspicious of the young crocodile but ultimately won over by its innocence, King Rufus and the Gobbos decide to raise it as one of their own and teach it in the ways of the Gobbos. The crocodile, named Croc, grows bigger over time, eventually becoming much larger than the Gobbos.

One day, Baron Dante and his band of villains known as the Dantinis invade Gobbo Valley and begin terrorizing the Gobbos, capturing them and locking them in steel cages. Amidst the chaos, King Rufus summons a magical yellow bird named Beany, who uses her magical abilities to transport Croc to safety, immediately before Rufus is snatched by Baron Dante.

By the time Croc has been brought to safety, the Dantinis have completely taken over all of Gobbo Valley, locked up all the Gobbos, and turned innocent creatures all across the valley into monsters to act as their minions. Croc sets out on a quest to free the Gobbos and defeat Baron Dante.

== Development ==
=== Concept ===
The end came when we pitched to do a 3D platform game, the likes of which had never been done before. We mocked up a prototype using Yoshi. It was essentially the world's first 3D platform game and was obviously a big risk - Nintendo had never let an outside company use their characters before, and weren't about to, either. This is the moment the deal fell apart. We later made that game into Croc: Legend of the Gobbos for the PlayStation, Saturn and PC, which became our biggest ever game in terms of sales and also in royalties, since we owned the IP.

— Jez San, founder of Argonaut Software

Croc: Legend of the Gobbos was developed by Argonaut Software, who were coming off of the heels of a successful relationship with Nintendo as a result of their development of the Super FX expansion chip used in Super Nintendo Entertainment System games such as Star Fox and Stunt Race FX. Early development of the game began in 1994, when Argonaut began experimenting with the concept of a platform game set in the third dimension. Under the tentative title "Yoshi Racing", the initial concept was a hybrid of several mechanics from the two video games Super Mario World and Super Mario Kart, with the player controlling the character Yoshi from Nintendo's Super Mario series. Argonaut created a prototype of Yoshi Racing and pitched it to Nintendo, who was initially enthusiastic about the game, according to San, with Super Mario creator Shigeru Miyamoto expressing particular fascination with the project. Despite this enthusiastic response, Nintendo ultimately rejected Argonaut's proposal, explaining that they already had a similar project in development. This, alongside the cancellation of the near-completed Star Fox 2, marked the end of Argonaut's relationship with Nintendo, prompting them to find another publisher who would finance and publish the game. After shopping the prototype around, Argonaut received offers from several publishers in 1996. Fox Interactive was chosen because the company had a solid plan for turning Croc into a multimedia franchise and was familiar to the staff at Argonaut, who were already working on a game for Fox (Alien Resurrection). According to Jez San, the prototype of Yoshi Racing that Argonaut had initially pitched to Nintendo was a large influence towards the creation and development of Super Mario 64, though in a 1997 interview he had stated that the similarity between the games might have been completely coincidental.

After being turned down by Nintendo, Argonaut sought the creation of a new character to take the place of Yoshi. Offering to design a new character was young computer artist Simon Keating, who "stumbled" into the game's development as his first job in the video game industry after hearing that the developers of the game needed a new main character. After having sketched out several different potential character designs, Keating ultimately came up with the final design of Croc as a result of Argonaut's request for him to design a character whose design looked marginally similar to that of Yoshi's. According to Keating, Croc was given a single fang protruding from his mouth in reference to his pet house cat at the time who shared the same characteristic.

The team came up with the game's plot and the concept of the Gobbos out of a desire to give Croc "something to save" that was not a damsel in distress such as a princess, which the team thought would have been too bizarre for the game's setting and main character. According to Keating, the Gobbos were colored pink in early stages of development, but character animator Pete Day changed the characters' fur color to brown in order to allow them to work better in a 3D environment.

=== Design ===
Croc's game mechanics were designed by Keating and lead designer Nic Cusworth. The game's levels were divided into several sub-sections due to hardware limitations at the time and Argonaut's desire to not have to deal with creating convincing depth perception. The team designed the game's levels with the mindset of making each individual room feel like its own individual puzzle that would give the player a sense of accomplishment whenever they completed it. Cusworth came up with the names for many of the levels, several of which were references to other pieces of popular culture; the game's first level, named "...And So The Adventure Begins", was a reference to the title card of the music video for the David Lee Roth song Yankee Rose, which Cusworth found in a video collection that he owned at the time. The level "Shouting Lava Lava Lava" was a play on words with the lyric "Shouting Lager Lager Lager" from the song Born Slippy by Underworld, which appeared in the British comedy film Trainspotting. Some snowboarding levels were created for the game but removed near the end of development because there was no time to finish them before the deadline, though San stated in an interview that they would be featured in the game's sequel.

Croc: Legend of the Gobbos was programmed using a proprietary BASIC-style language called the "Argonaut Strategy Language", while the levels and mechanics were created using an in-house level editor titled "CrocEd" which was run using MS-DOS. The engine for Croc went on to be repurposed by Argonaut for several of their other games, including Alien: Resurrection, Disney's Aladdin in Nasira's Revenge, and Harry Potter and the Philosopher's Stone. Although Croc supported use of the PlayStation's Dual Analog Controller's analog stick for movement, the controller was not released until late into the game's production and the game was mostly developed with directional pad control in mind; as a result of this, analog control was implemented into the game fairly late into its development.

=== Audio ===
The music for Croc was composed by Justin Scharvona, Karin Griffin and Martin Gwynn Jones. Scharvona had been composing music for several of Argonaut's games since 1988, and had worked in-house at the studio since 1994. The soundtrack was developed at the same time as the rest of the game, rather than being composed for an otherwise complete game. Scharvona tried to compose the game's songs so that people listening to the music would be able to "whistle along" with them. The game's title theme was inspired by a song included on a CD of Mexican music that Scharvona had listened to which featured a rhythmic piano riff and a solo trumpet as the lead. The ambient music playing during the cave levels took inspiration from several other popular pieces of music; the songs' rhythmic finger snaps and harpsichord were based on that of the title theme of The Addams Family, while the lead theremin was based on the horror-centric music from The Simpsons' Treehouse of Horror Halloween specials and the Hammond organ was derived from a cover of "Foxy Lady" that Scharvona had been composing for the video game Wayne's World at the time. According to Jez San, the composers created so many tunes for Croc that the audio had to be compressed 4:1 in order to fit it all on one disc.

The voice samples for Croc were provided by British actor Jonathan Aris, who was friends with Argonaut's audio department at the time. Aris came into Argonaut's studio to do the role and recorded all of his dialogue within an hour, according to Cusworth.

== Release ==
Croc: Legend of the Gobbos was announced by Fox Interactive in May 1997, and was first shown off at the 1997 Electronic Entertainment Expo in June as one of four games presented by Fox. The game was released simultaneously for Sony PlayStation, Sega Saturn and Windows in North America on 26 September, and in Europe on 10 October. The PlayStation version of the game was rereleased under Sony's Greatest Hits banner in late September 1998. The game was released in Japan on 18 December 1997 for the PlayStation and on 26 March 1998 for the Sega Saturn as Croc! Pau Pau Island, where it was published by Mitsui MediaQuest.

On 22 October 2026, Argonaut Games announced that a homebrew Nintendo 64 port would be produced. It will be released as a M64 cartridge by ModRetro in 2027.

=== Promotion ===
A commercial for Croc: Legend of the Gobbos was featured at the beginning of the VHS release of Casper: A Spirited Beginning as well as a VHS release of Power Rangers in Space. The commercial for the game was also featured in the June 1998 VHS release of Home Alone 3. In November 1997, a promotional sweepstakes contest was held by Electronic Gaming Monthly, in which contestants mailed in via postcard to win a copy of the game along with various pieces of Croc-themed apparel, including a suede/wool jacket, a leather backpack, a t-shirt, and a baseball cap. An official strategy guide for the game, written by Anthony James, was published by Prima Games in 1997.

=== Remaster ===
On 6 June 2023, Argonaut Software founder Jez San announced via Twitter that an HD Croc game was in early development. On 28 August 2024, Argonaut Games, which had closed down in 2004, announced the revival of the company alongside a remaster of Croc: Legend of the Gobbos for "all the current consoles" and Windows. The remaster, developed by Titanium Studios and Big Boat Interactive, features enhanced visuals, updated control schemes, and bonus content such as concept art and developer interviews. The game was released on Windows, Nintendo Switch, PlayStation 4, PlayStation 5, Xbox One and Xbox Series X/S on 2 April 2025. Physical editions of the Nintendo Switch and PlayStation 5 versions were distributed by Rock It Games in North America. A Platinum Edition update was released for Windows on 13 October 2025 and on other platforms three days later, which adds a time trial mode, more bonus gallery content, and new achievements. On 20 October 2026, Argonaut announced that the game would be released on the Nintendo Switch 2 in 2027, alongside the remaster of the sequel. The Switch 2, PlayStation 5, Xbox One and Xbox Series versions will be released physically by PM Studios in North America while Strictly Limited Games will handle physical publication for the Switch 2 and PlayStation 5 versions in Europe.

== Reception ==
Reception

Aggregate score
Aggregator	Score
GameRankings	79% (PS)

Review scores
Publication	Score
Electronic Gaming Monthly	7.5/10, 7.5/10, 7.5/10, 7.5/10 (PS, SAT)
Famitsu	8/10, 5/10, 6/10, 5/10 (PS)
Game Informer	8/10 (PS)
GameRevolution	B (PS/SAT)
GameSpot	5.8/10 (PS); 4.2/10 (PC)
IGN	8/10 (PS)
Next Generation	3/5 (PS)
PC Gamer (UK)	73% (PC)
PC Gamer (US)	68% (PC)
Sega Saturn Magazine	91% (SAT)

Croc: Legend of the Gobbos received average reviews from critics. The PlayStation version of the game held an aggregated review score of 79.14% on the review website GameRankings at the time of the site's 2019 closure, based on seven reviews.

Critics almost unanimously commented that the game is very derivative, shamelessly taking elements from earlier platformers such as Tomb Raider (hanging onto ledges, pushing blocks), Sonic the Hedgehog (losing collected items when hit), Gex (the tail whip attack), and Super Mario 64 (the butt stomp, the free-roaming 3D, the visual style), but most concluded that these secondhand elements were blended in a way that yielded an at least moderately entertaining experience with some feel of its own. Sushi-X of Electronic Gaming Monthly, for example, concluded that "Most features seem borrowed from other titles, but the mixture works pretty well." Game Informer stated that "We enjoy everything that has been taken from the different games, and we're sure you will too. Croc uses all of these ideas and adds its own flavor to it."

Critics further remarked that the game's similar graphics and scope to Super Mario 64 made it an impressive technical achievement for both the PlayStation and the Saturn, which were widely thought to be not as powerful as the Nintendo 64. Reviews for the Saturn version remarked that, while it is inferior to the PlayStation version, the differences between them are impressively minor. All four of Electronic Gaming Monthly's reviewers gave a 7.5 out of 10 to both versions.

Reviews also widely praised the catchy music, the atmospheric sound effects, and the added optional challenge of accessing secret areas. Sega Saturn Magazine summarized that "Argonaut has produced an audio experience that must be pumped through full surround sound speakers to be fully appreciated. Combining digitized speech, foot-tapping tunes and some frighteningly realistic ambient effects, Croc's many worlds boast an atmosphere that few developers ever both with."

The controls were more controversial. While some described them as solid and refined, others found they suffered from inconsistent responsiveness and illogical configuration. GamePro elaborated that "Inexplicably, pulling Down on the analog controller makes Croc take a step forward to swing around in an arc, plunging him off any ledges if he's too close." Most critics also found the camera to be a serious problem, making it difficult to judge jumps, especially in the later stages of the game. Joe Fielder of GameSpot said that this makes the game "frustratingly hard to play."

A lack of variety in the gameplay and environmental design was another widely cited problem. IGN praised the graphics and controls, while criticizing the lack of variation and noting its similarities to Super Mario 64. Next Generation also had an overall subdued response, judging that "the game provides just enough pretty, painless entertainment to keep gamers pacified, but there's not enough challenge to certify Croc a niche next to the classics it so readily seeks to emulate. It's just enough to avoid having its name used against it."

Reviews for the Windows version were generally more negative than those for the console versions. Josh Smith of GameSpot criticized the graphics, camera and controls, and ultimately deemed the game "a generic 3D platformer." PC Gamer noted that 3D platformers are difficult to do right because the roaming camera adds complications to the precision jumping the genre demands, and assessed that "The resulting gameplay can be anywhere from occasionally irritating to disastrous, and unfortunately, Fox Interactive’s newest 3D platformer Croc falls somewhere in between."

In 2014, GamesRadar included Croc on their list of the best Sega Saturn games of all time, noting that the game "gave players on Sega and Sony's machines a chance to explore 42 brightly colored levels' worth of Argonaut's take on the Mushroom Kingdom, earning the company a bestseller of its own in the process."

Croc: Legend of the Gobbos was considered a commercial success for Argonaut, with the PlayStation version of the game selling over a million copies in the U.S. and becoming a console bestseller in the UK for two months. By September 1998, the game had sold more than 1.5 million copies worldwide; over 2 million copies of the game had been shipped by May 1999, and by March 2000 it had sold over 2.4 million units. The game went on to become one of Argonaut Software's best-selling titles, with the PlayStation version of the game selling over 3 million copies worldwide.

== Legacy ==
A sequel to Croc: Legend of the Gobbos was first teased on the back of the Sega Saturn version of the game's manual. Initially advertised for a Christmas 1998 release, Croc 2 was released in June 1999 for the Sony PlayStation, and later for Microsoft Windows and the Game Boy Color. A Sega Saturn release was also advertised but never released, and a Sega Dreamcast port of the game was ultimately cancelled. The game follows Croc as he once again ventures to defeat Baron Dante, who has captured an old inventor Gobbo, while simultaneously searching for his long-lost parents. The game makes numerous gameplay changes from the first game, including the addition of a health counter, more mission-based levels, and an open hub area for navigating levels. A 2D side-scrolling port of the game for the Game Boy Color, simply titled Croc, was released in June 2000. Three mobile phone games based on the game, developed by Morpheme, were released through the mid-2000s, titled Croc Mobile: Jungle Rumble, Croc Mobile Pinball, and Croc Mobile: Volcanic Panic!.

Due to the success of the original game and its successor, Fox Interactive considered creating an animated TV series based on the games, a plan which never came into fruition.
