= Croc (series) =

- Genre: Platform game
- Developers: Argonaut Software (1997-2000, 2025-2026); Virtucraft (2000); Natsume Co., Ltd. (2001); Morpheme (2005-2006)
- Publishers: Fox Interactive (1997-2000); THQ (2000-2001); Morpheme (2005-2006); Argonaut Games (2025-2026)
- Creators: Nick Clarke & Enam Faroni
- Composer: Justin Scharvona
- Platforms: PlayStation; Sega Saturn; Microsoft Windows; Game Boy Color; Mobile phone; Nintendo Switch; Nintendo Switch 2; PlayStation 4; PlayStation 5; Xbox One; Xbox Series X/S; M64
- First release: Croc: Legend of the Gobbos; September 29, 1997
- Latest release: Croc 2: Kingdom of the Gobbos (Remaster); October 29, 2026

Croc is a video game series developed by Argonaut Software and published by Fox Interactive. It consists of two main games, plus three mobile games. A third main game was proposed but cancelled as Argonaut was "going through a rough patch", and an animated TV series based on the video game series was proposed by Fox Interactive but never came into fruition. By January 2001, the series had sold over 2.4 million copies worldwide on the PlayStation and Game Boy Color platforms.

== Games ==
Release timeline
1997	Croc: Legend of the Gobbos
1998
1999	Croc 2
2000	Croc
2001	Croc 2
2002
2003
2004
2005	Croc Mobile: Jungle Rumble!
2006	Croc Mobile: Pinball
2006	Croc Mobile: Volcanic Panic!
2007
2008
2009
2010
2011
2012
2013
2014
2015
2016
2017
2018
2019
2020
2021
2022
2023
2024
2025	Croc: Legend of the Gobbos (Remaster)
2026	Croc 2: Kingdom of the Gobbos (Remaster)

=== Main series ===
==== Croc: Legend of the Gobbos (1997) ====
Croc: Legend of the Gobbos was developed by Argonaut and published by Fox Interactive for the PlayStation, Sega Saturn and Microsoft Windows in 1997. It was also published in Japan by Mitsui MediaQuest for the PlayStation and Sega Saturn as Croc! Pau Pau Island.

The game tells the tale of Croc, an orphan crocodile who is found and raised by a race of furry creatures known as Gobbos. The evil Baron Dante and his henchmen, the Dantinis, take over the Gobbo Archipelago after kidnapping the Gobbos, including their leader, King Rufus, who saves Croc from the Baron's clutches by summoning Beanie the Bird just in time. Croc must rescue the Gobbos and defeat Baron Dante.

The game was originally conceived as a 3D platform game starring Yoshi from the Super Mario series, titled Yoshi Racing. The prototype was later rejected by Nintendo as they were developing Super Mario 64 at the time, but soon was believed to have influenced the game.

==== Croc 2 (1999) ====
Croc 2 is the sequel to the above game, also developed by Argonaut, and published by Fox Interactive for the PlayStation in 1999 and Microsoft Windows the following year. It was also published in Japan by Koei for the PlayStation as Croc Adventure.

Croc finds a message in a bottle, from two crocodiles looking for their son. King Rufus reads the message and believes that the senders are Croc's parents; thus, the Gobbos decide to help Croc find them by catapulting him to the Mainland. However, Croc will also have to defeat Baron Dante again and rescue Professor Gobbo, as the Dantinis have kidnapped him shortly after resurrecting the Baron.

=== Handheld series ===
==== Croc (2000) ====
Croc is an alternative telling of Croc: Legend of the Gobbos. It was developed by Virtucraft and published by THQ for the Game Boy Color in 2000.

Unlike the original game, this version is a 2D platform game.

==== Croc 2 (2001) ====
Croc 2 for the Game Boy Color is an alternative telling of the sequel, similar to its predecessor. It was developed by Natsume Co., Ltd. and published by THQ in 2001.

The game plays from a top-down perspective and involves platforming, action-adventure, and puzzle solving.

=== Croc Mobile series ===
==== Croc Mobile: Jungle Rumble! (2005) ====
Croc Mobile: Jungle Rumble! was developed and published by Morpheme for mobile phones in October 2005. It was the first game in the Croc Mobile series to be released.

The game is an isometric platformer with a simple story of Baron Dante returning and Croc having to save the day.

==== Croc Mobile: Pinball (2006) ====
Croc Mobile: Pinball was developed and published by Morpheme for mobile phones in 2006. It was the second game in the Croc Mobile series to be released.

It is a simple pinball game featuring Croc characters on the board.

==== Croc Mobile: Volcanic Panic! (2006) ====
Croc Mobile: Volcanic Panic! was developed and published by Morpheme for mobile phones in 2006. It was the third and final game in the Croc Mobile series to be released.

Like Croc Mobile: Jungle Rumble!, the game is an isometric platformer with a simple story of Baron Dante returning and Croc having to save the day. This time, Baron Dante disrupts the wedding of King Rufus and Princess Tara by kidnapping the latter and the guests. Croc must rescue them to put the wedding back in action.

== Legacy ==
=== Cancelled projects ===
There was to be a third main game in the series, aptly titled Croc 3, in which Croc, after returning to his family, would train other crocodiles for them to live their own adventures. It was to be an online multiplayer game on the original Xbox. However, it was cancelled as Argonaut was "going through a rough patch".

Fox Interactive planned to make an animated TV series based on the video game series, but it never came into fruition.

=== HD remasters ===
On June 6, 2023, Argonaut founder Jez San confirmed on X that an HD remaster of Croc: Legend of the Gobbos started early development. On August 28, 2024, Argonaut Games, which had previously closed down in 2004, announced the revival of the company alongside a remaster of Croc: Legend of the Gobbos, released on "all the current consoles" and PC on April 2, 2025. The remaster features enhanced visuals, updated control schemes, and bonus content such as concept art and developer interviews. During development of the 2025 remaster of Croc: Legend of the Gobbos, Argonaut Games stated in an X post on October 12, 2024 that they would be up to remastering Croc 2 if sales of the first game's remaster were successful. On July 29, 2026, a remaster of Croc 2 was officially revealed under the game's originally planned title, Croc 2: Kingdom of the Gobbos. Like with the previous remaster, the game will feature enhanced graphics and include extras such as design materials and developer interviews. The game was released on October 29, 2026 for Nintendo Switch, PlayStation 4. PlayStation 5, Xbox Series S and Series X and PC, with a Nintendo Switch 2 port set to be released afterwards.
