= Croc (2000 video game) =

2000 video game

- North American cover art
- Developers: Virtucraft; Argonaut Games
- Publisher: THQ
- Producers: Nick Clarke; David Stalker
- Programmer: Paul Windett
- Artists: Nick Lee; Chris Rundell
- Composers: Justin Scharvona; Karin Griffin
- Series: Croc
- Platform: Game Boy Color
- Release: NA: 6 June 2000; EU: 1 December 2000
- Genre: Platform
- Mode: Single-player

Croc is a scrolling platform game for the Game Boy Color (GBC) developed by British studio Virtucraft with assistance from Argonaut Games and published by THQ under license from Fox Interactive. Released on 6 June 2000, it is a 2D remake of the 1997 3D platform game Croc: Legend of the Gobbos with similar gameplay. The game follows Croc, a crocodile, on a quest to save a race of furry creatures called Gobbos from the evil Baron Dante. The game received mixed reviews from critics. A second game for the GBC, Croc 2, was released in 2001, based on the 1999 game of the same title.

== Gameplay ==
Croc is a 2D side-scrolling platformer in which the player controls a green crocodile named Croc who sets out on a quest to rescue the Gobbos from the evil Baron Dante. The player controls Croc through a series of various short levels, each accessed through a top-down world map. The main goal is to progress through to the end of the stage and hit the gong at the end of the level in order to progress to the next one. At the end of each world, a boss must be defeated in order to progress to the next world. Numerous collectibles are scattered throughout levels, such as blue crystals that act as Croc's health and give the player an extra life when 100 of them are collected, small hearts that also give the player an extra life, and crates containing items that can be broken apart. Each level contains 3 Gobbos, which are hidden throughout the stage in various locations. Also located throughout every stage are 5 multicolored letters spelling out the word "bonus"; collecting all of these letters unlocks a door located at the end of the stage leading to one of several minigames that can be played in order to win a fourth Gobbo, including a slider puzzle, a Whac-a-Mole-esque game, a catching game in which the player moves a bowl back and forth in order to collect various falling items, and a slot machine game. Collecting every single Gobbo in each level before a boss level unlocks a secret level containing a hidden Jigsaw puzzle piece. While collecting all of these pieces is not mandatory for completing the game, doing so unlocks a door in each world that leads to a room where the mini games from the end of the levels, themed after each world, can be played at the player’s leisure.

Croc's moves are very similar to his moves in Croc: Legend of the Gobbos, dawning the ability to walk, climb and swim using the Game Boy Color's directional pad, as well as being able to jump and run using the console's "A" and "B" buttons, respectively. Croc's main methods of attacking consist of swiping his tail in a circular motion, which can be used to defeat enemies and is used to hit the gong at the end of each stage, and a downward hit drop attack that is used to smash open crates containing items. Croc's health is represented by the number of crystals he collects throughout each level; when he is hurt, he loses a small number of crystals. If Croc is hurt while carrying no crystals, he loses a life.

== Development and Release ==
The game was a collaboration between Virtucraft and Argonaut Games, the former handling most of the game's development.

In March 2000, Fox Interactive, the publisher of the console versions of Croc, signed a publishing deal with THQ for several titles.

== Reception ==
Reception

Aggregate score
Aggregator	Score
GameRankings	54%

Review scores
Publication	Score
GameSpot	4.4/10
IGN	5/10

Croc received mixed reviews from critics. The game holds an aggregated score of 54% on review website GameRankings.

== 2025 re-release ==
In a video posted on YouTube on October 29, 2024, Argonaut Games stated that while the game wouldn't be included with the 2025 remaster of "Croc: Legend of the Gobbos," it would have plans for the title to celebrate its 25th anniversary later that year.

On 6 June 2025, Argonaut officially announced that the game would be re-released both digitally and as a physical cartridge later in the year through publisher ModRetro. The re-release includes quality-of-life improvements, including a save feature and a revised control scheme. It was released in December 2025.
