= Catwoman (video game) =

2004 video game

- Developers: Argonaut Games (Note: Additional work by EA UK.); Magic Pockets (GBA)
- Publisher: Electronic Arts
- Director: Andrew Curtis
- Producer: Simon Harris
- Designer: Jez Harris
- Programmers: Mario D'Onofrio; Warrick Buchanan
- Artist: John Miles
- Composer: James Hannigan
- Platforms: Game Boy Advance, GameCube, PlayStation 2, Windows, Xbox
- Release: NA: 23 July 2004; AU: 30 July 2004; EU: 6 August 2004
- Genre: Action-adventure
- Modes: Single-player, multiplayer

Catwoman is an action-adventure video game based on the 2004 film of the same name based on the fictional character. It features the likeness of the film's lead actress Halle Berry, while the character's voice is provided by actress Jennifer Hale. This was developer Argonaut Software's final game for 19 years (not counting Star Fox 2, which was completed in 1995, but was not released until 2017) until the company's relaunch in 2024.

== Gameplay ==
The game is a third-person action platformer where the player must use the heroine's cat-like strength and agility to travel through various environments and defeat various enemies. There is also a sense of exploration in the game, similar to the Tomb Raider series. Catwoman can climb up walls and swing from metal poles to navigate through the environment. Catwoman must also solve puzzles at certain parts of the game to advance further. The game also features a combat system for when fighting enemies. The player is able to upgrade moves and perform simple combo strings.

== Plot ==
The game loosely follows the story of the movie. Patience Phillips, a shy office worker in the Hedare corporate empire, accidentally discovers her employers' dark secret and is subsequently murdered. She is then revived by a supernatural Egyptian cat granting her cat-like abilities. Now reborn as "Catwoman", she then embarks on a tale of revenge against the people who nearly murdered her.

== Development ==
UK website Computer and Video Games (CVG) first reported the potential of a tie-in game for the then-upcoming Catwoman film in June 2003, with Argonaut Games significantly investing into its pitch for the license after the cancellation of Malice and Orchid respectively by Vivendi Universal Games and Namco Hometek. CVG then reported on a rumor in January 2004 which claimed that Electronic Arts (EA) had acquired the rights from Warner Bros. Interactive Entertainment to produce the game with Argonaut developing it, marking the first time EA collaborated with Argonaut since Harry Potter and the Philosopher's Stone (2001). EA and Warner Bros. confirmed the rumor on February 12, 2004, in an official announcement proclaiming a multi-year deal between the two parties to develop games based on the Catwoman intellectual property; the game was planned for the PlayStation 2, Xbox, GameCube, Game Boy Advance, and PC. Catwoman was showcased at E3 2004 alongside other EA titles, having been in development for eight months at that point. The game was released in North America on July 23, 2004, the same day as the film. It was released in Australia on 30 July and in Europe on 6 August.

In a 2022 interview, Argonaut founder Jez San revealed that Catwoman represented the largest effort the company ever handled due to its accelerated development time, with around 100 employees dedicated to the game; in comparison, the industry average was 30–40 during the sixth generation of video game consoles while Argonaut was accustomed to small teams of 15 or so during the fifth generation.

== Reception ==
Reception

Aggregate score
Aggregator	Score
Metacritic	(GBA) 61/100 (GC) 47/100 (PC) 46/100 (PS2) 46/100 (Xbox) 45/100

Review scores
Publication	Score
1Up.com	C− (PC) F
Electronic Gaming Monthly	4/10
Eurogamer	3/10
Game Informer	(GBA) 6.5/10; 4.75/10
GamePro	2/5
GameRevolution	F
GameSpot	6.3/10 (PC) 5.6/10 (GBA) 5.4/10
GameSpy	2/5
GameZone	(GBA) 5.8/10; 5.5/10 (GC) 5/10 (PS2) 4.1/10
IGN	(GBA) 6.5/10; 4/10 (PC) 3.8/10
Nintendo Power	(GBA) 3.1/5 (GC) 2.7/5
Official U.S. PlayStation Magazine	1/5
Official Xbox Magazine (US)	4.3/10
PC Gamer (US)	49%

Similar to the film it was based on, Catwoman the game received negative reviews from critics due to problems including bad camera control, poor voice-work, and an over-simplistic combat system. However, the Game Boy Advance version received mixed reviews with aggregating review website Metacritic giving the version 61/100. The GameCube version ranked in at 47/100, the PC version with 46/100, the PlayStation 2 version with 46/100 and the Xbox version with 45/100.

The critical and commercial failure of the film at the box office hindered sales of the game to the detriment of Argonaut; with the company struggling from the transition between the fifth and sixth generations and facing dwindling cash reserves, it ultimately underwent liquidation only three months after the game's release.
