= Alien Odyssey =

1995 video game

- Developer: Argonaut Software
- Publisher: Philips Media
- Platform: MS-DOS
- Release: 1995
- Genre: Action-adventure
- Mode: Single-player

Alien Odyssey is an action-adventure game developed by Argonaut Software and published by Philips Media in 1995. The game features a mixture of first-person and third-person gameplay, with sequences involving shooter, adventure and puzzle mechanics. Alien Odyssey makes use of 3D rendering and full motion video cutscenes which were developed using the developer's proprietary B-Render graphics software. Upon release, the game received a mixed reception, with reviewers praising the visual presentation of the game, whilst critiquing the game's inconsistent mixture of game modes and short length.

== Gameplay ==
Gameplay screenshot

Gameplay in Alien Odyssey is structured over four main sections, each with distinctive action gameplay mechanics. The first section, the 'Forest', is a full motion video shooter played in first person perspective where the player rides a hover bike on a linear path through the forest, and fires at enemies using the cursor. The player has a health and shield bar, and is required to protect their companion, Gaan, from enemy fire. In later sections, the 'Communications Bunker' and 'Armory', players have free movement to explore environments in third person perspective to complete an overarching level objective, such as destroying the reactor of the bunker. To progress, players are required to complete puzzles, such as using terminals to search for keys to unlock security doors. These sections face several obstacles, including floor fans, burning slime, tripwires to trigger guns and lasers, and enemies that wander the levels. Between these levels, players engage in a second action sequence in the 'Mine', a similar where players are able to rotate their ship to avoid oncoming obstacles.

== Plot ==
The player assumes the role of protagonist Psaph Abal, a scientific surveyor who ventures from the home planet of Taola to explore new planets and understand the universe. Upon discovering a carbon-based lifeform in the Betan planetary system, Psaph crash-lands on the planet in an attempt to investigate further. Stranded and with no way home, Psaph is rescued by Gaan Ta'Tukinae of the Yuma, and recruited to fight against the Dak, a hostile race of cyborg aliens launching an invasion of the planet. Together, race through the forest on a Dak bike to the Yuma village, and are tasked with destroying the two Dak bases, a communications bunker and armory, to thwart the invasion.

== Development ==
Alien Odyssey was the first of a line of titles published in 1995 exclusively for MS-DOS by Philips Media following release of the CD-i. The game was developed by Argonaut Software, with the characters and environments animated using the developer's own proprietary B-Render graphics software. Nic Cusworth of Argonaut Software stated the developer explored porting Alien Odyssey to the Sega CD, with preliminary work to decode full motion video sequences for the platform, but work on the port was discontinued. In 2021, source code for an unreleased port of Alien Odyssey for the Saturn was leaked online. The game was also influential in the decision by Fox Interactive to contract Argonaut Software to develop the 2000 PS1 title Alien Resurrection, with several Alien Odyssey staff immediately beginning development on the title following completion of the game.

== Reception ==
Reception

Review scores
Publication	Score
Computer Gaming World	2.5/5
Computer and Video Games	62%
Hyper	78%
PC Gamer (US)	70%
PC Zone	77%
Computer Game Review	87/87/79
PC Entertainment	B

Alien Odyssey received a mixed reception from video game publications. Critics were mixed on the gameplay modes featured in Alien Odyssey, finding the game insufficiently original. Brett Jones for PC Gamer noted the game "suffers from a slight identity crisis", finding the game's "odd combination" of genres "tries to be all things to all people, but ends up being...somewhat confusing". Peter Olafson of Computer Gaming World critiqued the game as an "amalgamation of interesting parts" and collection of "nearly interactive sub-games" with "too little meat in the gameplay". PC Zone stated that the game was "more or less a carbon copy" of other titles, unfavourably comparing the game as "no match for BioForge or Cyberia". George Soropos for Hyper noted the full motion video gameplay "has never been done before, but isn't really that exciting, and FMV has a long way to go before it becomes truly interactive."

Reviewers praised the game's visual presentation and animations, although found the game too short. Bill Meyer of PC Entertainment praised the "strong graphics" and the "slick hi-res" and "well integrated rendered sequences." PC Zone praised the game's "character animation and background graphics", highlighting the cutscenes as a "welcome diversion to the sometimes plodding adventure gameplay." Peter Olafson of Computer Gaming World praised the "sumptuous scenery", but noted much of it was "just background eye candy...interaction with the environment is nil." Dave Upchurch of Computer and Video Games stated that the game was "fun and graphically very impressive, (but) it's simply too short to keep hardcore gameheads happy for long". Similarly, Computer Game Review also critiqued the game's limited gameplay, noting that the game "took only seven hours to complete".
