= Independence War 2: Edge of Chaos =

2001 video game

- Developer: Particle Systems
- Publisher: Infogrames
- Directors: Michael Powell; Richard Aidley
- Producers: Kim Blake; Roger Godfrey
- Designer: Nigel Kershaw
- Programmer: Will Vale
- Artists: Matt Clark; Andrew Turner
- Composer: Christopher Mann
- Platform: Microsoft Windows
- Release: EU: June 29, 2001; NA: August 28, 2001; AU: November 7, 2001
- Genre: Space combat simulator
- Modes: Single-player, multiplayer

Independence War 2: Edge of Chaos (sometimes called Independence War 2: The Edge of Chaos), released as Edge of Chaos: Independence War 2 in Europe, is a sequel to the space combat simulator video game Independence War (also known as I-War in Europe). Developed by Particle Systems - the developers of the first game - and published by Infogrames, the game was released in 2001. It was nominated for an interactive BAFTA award for its soundtrack which was composed by Christopher Mann.

== Plot ==
Edge of Chaos is set in the 24th century, 100 years after the first game, in an isolated part of space called the Badlands Cluster. The star cluster is far removed from Earth, the Core Systems, and their central governing body, the New Alliance; also, the Alliance government was in a state of near-collapse due to corruption and massive overspending. As a result, huge corporations step in to take control, and they rule quite tyrannically.

The game begins with a CGI video showing the murder of 12-year-old Cal Johnston's father by industrial heir Caleb Maas. The player then assumes the role of young Cal as he is instructed in space ship piloting by the digitized personality of Commonwealth Navy captain Jefferson Clay, a character familiar from the original I-War. After getting used to basics of space flight, Clay guides Cal to the base of his space pirating grandmother. After some more practice missions, Cal encounters the infamous Caleb Maas. Trying to avenge his father, Cal ends up in prison instead. The story then fast-forwards 15 years showing a now-adult Cal Johnston with some of his fellow inmates escaping the prison space station, where the core gameplay begins.

Upon returning to his grandmother's base, Cal begins to set up his own piracy organization. Other groups in Hoffer's Wake begin to notice his work, and as he advances in fame and fortune he learns more about the current situation affecting the Badlands. For a long time, a group called the Marauders have been attacking at random—essentially terrorizing the people of the Cluster. Despite numerous attempts to run them down, the Badlands government and gangs have had no luck in stopping the attacks: the Marauders don't seem weakened even by major losses, and they don't seem to have any single base of operations.

The player is soon given access to other systems in the Cluster, with the assignment to find help fighting the Marauders in Hoffer's Wake. Most are only too happy to lend ships, supplies, and personnel once their own Marauder problems are taken care of, and the Marauders are successfully driven from Hoffer's Wake before long. However even that loss didn't slow them down, and further investigation on Cal's part reveals that they have been maintaining their primary base in the Dante system, long abandoned and thought uninhabitable after the unstable binary star flooded the system with radiation and cut it off from outside travel. The Rebel Fleet, now very large and well-organized, mounts a successful assault—only to be nearly destroyed anyway when the Marauders receive help from the Maas Corporation, who started the Marauders to "keep you peasants in line."

The Rebels can't hope to directly match Maas's forces, so they fall back and try to think of alternative strategies. They conclude that the most effective action would be to find help outside of the Badlands, so they attack and secure the Santa Romera Jump Accelerator, a highly advanced piece of technology that allows travel over significantly longer distances than even Lagrange points. Cal arrives in the Fomalhaut system in the Gagarin Cluster to find much the same situation as in the Badlands: oppressive corporate rule, roving Marauders, and a desperate need for assistance.

After working for a while, Cal receives a seemingly innocuous mission in which he is sent to spy on a number of corporate cruisers in the Gagarin Cluster. The story takes a sharp turn when, against Caleb Maas's wishes, corporate scientists activate an alien artifact that Cal himself stole for them, thinking to use it as some sort of weapon. The device goes out of control and begins to emit glowing red alien ships that eat (and thus destroy) any advanced power sources (such as ships) in their path; within days, the entire Gagarin Cluster is overrun. Cal and the fleet hold the aliens back from the Fomalhaut Jump Accelerator as refugees escape, then dash through at the last second and destroy the Accelerator, effectively isolating the Badlands indefinitely from the rest of human civilization. Cal remarks that they are safe from the aliens, but he's not sure about human civilization elsewhere.

The gameplay is a mix of free movement in space and missions. In free play, Cal can act independently, move throughout the Hoffer's Wake system and eventually the entire Badlands Cluster, and steal cargo. Game missions allow the player to gain new weapons and ships, and contribute to the rebellions against the corporations that control the Badlands.

== Gameplay ==
The view from inside the playership showing the virtual HUD

== Development ==
The technological improvements over the first game included support for Direct3D compatible hardware accelerated 3D graphics, network multiplay and a new user interface. Edge of Chaos gave a nod to Elite style gameplay by adding free roaming piracy to the Independence War games' universe. The familiar Newtonian mechanics obeying flight model with a flight computer assistance was retained, although combat was somewhat simplified and made more accessible to the player.

Edge of Chaos was initially developed for Windows-based PCs, PlayStation, Nintendo 64 and Dreamcast, but the PlayStation, Nintendo 64 and Dreamcast versions were cancelled. The dual platform development affected some design decisions. Most of the ship's function interface was made navigable through a joystick hat control, but on the negative side, partly due to being designed for a game console without a hard disk, game progress could only be saved between missions, in the home base.

A browser-based game, Edge of Chaos Online, was created as part of the marketing campaign in late 2001.

On July 6, 2010, GOG.com re-released the game digitally.

== Reception ==
Reception

Aggregate score
Aggregator	Score
Metacritic	83/100

Review scores
Publication	Score
Computer Games Magazine	3.5/5
Computer Gaming World	4.5/5
Game Informer	9/10
GamePro	4/5
GameSpot	8.9/10
GameSpy	81%
GameZone	8.5/10
IGN	8.2/10
Next Generation	3/5
PC Gamer (US)	80%
Playboy	80%

The game received favorable reviews according to the review aggregation website Metacritic. John Lee of NextGen said of the game, "Only a too-accurate space flight model mars this otherwise compelling space Western."

The game was a nominee for Computer Gaming World's 2001 "Best Simulation Game" award, which ultimately went to IL-2 Sturmovik. It was also a runner-up for the "Best Game No One Played" award at GameSpot's Best and Worst of 2001 Awards, which went to Clive Barker's Undying.

The game was a critical, but not financial, success, contributing to the eventual acquisition of developers Particle Systems by Argonaut Games, which changed the team name to Argonaut Sheffield.
