= I-War (1997 video game) =

- European cover art
- Developer: Particle Systems
- Publishers: EU: Infogrames Multimedia; NA: Infogrames Entertainment; (Note: Released under the Ocean brand name.)
- Director: Glyn Williams
- Producer: Dave Hawkins
- Designers: Glyn Williams; Michael Powell; Michael Todd; Matt Clark; Andy Turner
- Programmers: Michael Powell; Richard Aidley
- Artists: Matt Clark; Andy Turner; Michael Todd; Glyn Williams
- Writer: Glyn Williams
- Composer: Kevin Saville
- Engine: BRender
- Platform: Windows
- Release: EU: November 1997; NA: August 18, 1998
- Genre: Space combat simulator
- Mode: Single-player

I-War (known as Independence War in North America) is a space combat simulator developed by Particle Systems and published by Infogrames. The game was first published in November 1997 in Europe, and in late August 1998 in North America.

An additional campaign was designed, packaged with the original game and released in September 1999 as Independence War Deluxe Edition in North America and Independence War Special Edition in Europe.

A sequel: Independence War 2: Edge of Chaos, was released in 2001.

== Gameplay ==
As the captain of Dreadnaught, the player could assume the command of any of the four workstations on the command bridge. From the command station, the player received their mission briefings and could sometimes control other ships through a remote link. The station also had access to an accurate star map. The ship was normally flown from the navigation station. From the weapons station, the player had an outside view of Dreadnaught's wire frame model. Following a locked target, the angle of view could rotate 360 degrees on all axes. This workstation also had a ripple fire mode which allowed attacking quickly a large group of enemies. The fourth station engineering was for controlling the repairs when the ship was damaged by weapons or a collision with another object. However, the automated repair functioned well and player supervision was rarely needed. The station also had a fuel gauge, which was nonfunctional because the game design was changed to give Dreadnaught limitless fuel.

In the game, the player takes the role of an unnamed 23rd century spaceship captain in the Earth Commonwealth Navy. The primary opponents were rebellious insurgents called the Indies, a group distinguished by their elaborately and colourfully painted ships.

I-War was notable for its use of Newtonian physics; unlike other popular space combat games such as Wing Commander and Descent: Freespace, the flight model is subject to inertia caused by a ship's mass and the absence of drag in outer space. In addition to common flight dynamics, vessels can move and accelerate in all directions: up, down, forward, backwards and sideways.

The game features two gameplay modes: campaign mode, and a mode for immediate space battle with endlessly spawning enemies. The campaign consists of a series of 40 linear missions, with one or more missions being available at a time. After completing a key mission, one or more new missions become available. Sometimes a different set of missions can be unlocked depending on the outcome of the previous mission, thus setting the campaign in different directions. Three different endings to the campaign were possible. The nature of missions varied greatly; there were many combinations of combat and problem solving. The puzzles often made use of the game's physics modeling.

Depending on the mission, Dreadnaught can be acting alone, supporting another vessel, or commanding a group of wingmen. During other missions, various special equipment is at the player's disposal, such as a reconnaissance drone.

The player ship is armed with Particle Beam cannons and various kinds of missiles. For protection, the ship is equipped with energy shields, that are capable of tracking and absorbing enemy fire from a single ship at a time. The bridge of the player ship is a small ship of its own, called the 'command section'. It is capable of detaching from the rest of the ship.

During LDS-travel, ships are not able to use any weapons except missiles designed to stop LDS-travel. Ships in LDS cannot be attacked, either.

The game began with a 14 minute long high quality CGI animation to introduce the game's setting and even some gameplay features through the story of Jefferson Clay and his last battle. Along the campaign, shorter pieces of CGI encoded in RAD Game Tools's Smacker video format would be shown within missions as cutscenes. These sometimes provided clues to solving some problematic aspect of the current mission. Simple CGI animations utilising wire frame models were used in mission briefings. Occasionally, external camera views were used for kind of real-time, game engine rendered cutscenes, such as when Dreadnaught docked or undocked with another ship or a space station.

== Development ==
The development of I-War was led by Particle Systems co-founders Glyn Williams (whose previous games include Warhead for Amiga and Atari ST) and Michael Powell (whose previous games include Subwar 2050 for MS-DOS). With Williams and Powell included, Independence War had a development team of six men, which was the full personnel of Particle Systems at the time.

The games polygon models were created using BRender. The team wrote their own low-level routines for texturing.

The game had some naming troubles. I-War was originally signed to Philips, who were moving into PC games. At the time the game had merely a working title, "big ships". The first suggested name was "Dreadnaught", per the player ship, but it was considered to be meaningless to French and German audiences. The next name candidate was "Infinity War", which was found to be also a name of a Marvel Comics comic book miniseries, The Infinity War. Therefore, the name was shortened to I-War. At this time Philips Media was taken over by Infogrames, who became the publisher of the game.

I-War was first released in Europe in November 1997, under the label of Ocean Software. Ocean was acquired by Infogrames earlier that year. This version, having no 3D hardware support, had only software rendered graphics. The game was released in English, French and German. I-War was a critical success, but wasn't selling as well as expected.

In late August, 1998, the game was released in North America, but as Independence War, because "I-War" was already trademarked by Atari Corporation for a Jaguar game.

The American version was successful and won 'Space-Sim of the year' awards from many magazines and websites. Encouraged by this, an expanded edition was designed. I-War / Independence War sold around 250,000 copies worldwide. Including the special editions the total sales were about 300,000.

== Defiance ==
Later, an additional campaign from the Indie side of the conflict, called Defiance, was developed. The campaign consisted of 18 missions and it mirrored the I-War campaign. This time the player assumed the role of Edison Hayes, a captain of the Indie fleet and the Dreadnaught-class corvette Spartacus. Defiance had three new features: in-mission savepoints, limited customisation of player ship's weapons and a zoom mode for longer range weapons fire.

Originally Defiance was supposed to be released as an expansion pack, but Infogrames decided they would prefer a special edition that would have both the new campaign and the original game in the same box. This special edition was released in the US as Independence War Deluxe Edition in 1999. The European version was released the same year, but was called Independence War Special Edition instead since it was reasoned that 'deluxe' doesn't mean much to the French or German audiences. The American version also included a $10 rebate for owners of Independence War, but no rebate was included with the European version. On May 25, 2010, GOG.com re-released Independence War Deluxe Edition digitally.

The development of Defiance was led by Stephen Robertson who also maintained a strong and long lasting on-line presence helping players of the Independence War series.

== Reception ==
The game won Computer Games Strategy Plus's 1998 "Sci-Fi Simulation of the Year" award. The editors wrote, "With mission-driven play, good graphics, and detailed space combat action, this European import turned out to be quite a hit on this side of the Atlantic."

The Academy of Interactive Arts & Sciences nominated I-War for "PC Simulation Game of the Year" at the 2nd Annual Interactive Achievement Awards, although it lost to Need for Speed III: Hot Pursuit.
