= I-War (1995 video game) =

- Developer: Imagitec Design
- Publisher: Atari Corporation
- Producers: Bill Newsham; Ted Tahquechi
- Designer: Emerson Best
- Programmers: Andrew Seed; Karl West
- Artists: Andrew Seed; Andy Noble; Karl West
- Composer: Alastair Lindsay
- Platform: Atari Jaguar
- Release: NA: December 15, 1995; EU: December 1995
- Genre: Shooter
- Modes: Single-player, multiplayer

I-War is a 1995 shooter video game developed by Imagitec Design and published by Atari Corporation for the Atari Jaguar. The plot takes place in a futuristic setting where the mainframe supercomputer Override begins to mutate databases and create computer viruses. The player is tasked with piloting an antivirus tank vehicle to eliminate mutated databases and viruses clogging the I-Way network, while recovering data pods and facing off against a variety of enemies.

Imagitec proposed a racing game to Philips Interactive Media, but backed out before production started, and the project eventually morphed into I-War for Atari. It was co-produced by Bill Newsham and Ted Tahquechi, who worked on Jaguar titles such as Cybermorph and Kasumi Ninja. The game was first announced under the working title Redemption and early versions only had gouraud shading for the visuals; however, the team knew that Atari would have requested texture mapping and implemented it, but maintained the possibility of disabling it if Atari changed its course. The soundtrack was scored by Alastair Lindsay, who also composed Tempest 2000.

I-War garnered mixed reception from critics; reviewers expressed mixed opinions regarding the graphics, sound, controls, gameplay, and frame rate, but some complimented its multiplayer mode. Atari allowed Particle Systems to use the name for the 1997 space combat simulation game of the same title. Retrospective commentary for the game has been generally favorable.

== Gameplay ==
Internal view of an antivirus tank being attacked while firing enemies in a room, with a data pod on a platform.

I-War is a three-dimensional shooter game played from a first-person perspective, similar to Cybermorph and Assault Rigs. The plot takes place in a futuristic setting where the mainframe supercomputer Override, became operational after decades of development. Override was designed to handle the increasingly complex I-Way network, and therefore society begins to rely heavily on it. The system operated without problems until its databases began to mutate and create computer viruses that obstruct the I-Way network, causing delays in information transfers that drive Override to the point of self-destruction. The player is tasked with piloting an antivirus tank vehicle to eliminate mutated databases and viruses obstructing the I-Way network.

The main objective of the game is to retrieve data pods while facing a variety of enemies to remove existing virus programs in each of the 21 levels. The player can choose between three different types of tanks, each with their own advantages and disadvantages. Most levels feature traps and manipulable switches that activate devices like doors, jump pads, and teleporters. The levels are sorted into closed rooms connected via teleporters. The player can also explore each level to uncover items and weapon power-ups. After retrieving a pre-determined number of data pods, an exit will open and the player proceeds to the next level. Between levels there are bonus rounds in which the player are tasked with collecting a set percentage of data pods to gain an extra life.

During gameplay, the player can toggle an auto-targeting reticle, activate a level map, switch between camera angles, or change perspective from first-person to third-person. The game is over once all lives are lost, though the player can resume their progress via a save function. In the options menu, the player has access to settings such as three difficulty levels and control setup. The game also has a two-player split-screen versus mode.

== Development ==
I-War was developed by Imagitec Design, which had previously developed several games for the Atari Jaguar such as Evolution: Dino Dudes, a conversion of Raiden (1990), and Bubsy in Fractured Furry Tales. During development, the project went under the working titles Redemption, Dreadnaught, and Netwar. It was co-produced by Bill Newsham and Ted Tahquechi of Atari Corporation, who worked on Jaguar titles like Cybermorph and Kasumi Ninja. The game was designed by Emerson Best, who also acted as co-level designer alongside co-programmers Andrew Seed and Karl West (miscredited as Karl Vest). Seed and West also served as co-graphic artists along with Andy Noble. The soundtrack was scored by English composer Alastair Lindsay, who also composed Tempest 2000.

Seed recalled that Imagitec proposed a racing game project to Philips Interactive Media, but backed out before production began, with the project eventually morphed into I-War for Atari. Seed stated that the tank configuration screen was initially a shop menu, where the player could spend credits in exchange for additional equipment for the tank and juggle between offensive or defensive upgrades and speed. Atari requested to add a bonus round sequence to the game, which proved easy and quick to implement as Seed was reminiscent of the tunnel levels in Stardust (1993). Seed revealed that early versions of the game only had gouraud shading for the visuals; however, the staff knew Atari would have requested texture mapping. The team implemented texture mapping but maintained the possibility of disabling it, in case Atari changed its course. Internal documentation from Atari showed that production of the game was completed by December 11, 1995. Seed found the game easier to develop compared to Fractured Furry Tales, as West had previously worked on 3D titles and handled the gameplay aspect while he took care of the rest.

== Release ==
The game was first advertised under the name Redemption, planning for release in the second quarter of 1995. It was later showcased during an event hosted by Atari Corporation dubbed "Fun 'n' Games Day" under its final title, I-War. The game was first published by Atari in North America on December 15, 1995, and in Europe the same month. After finishing production, Imagitec Design ceased support for the Atari Jaguar and ended its relationship with Atari due to internal conflicts. In 1997, the game's trademark was abandoned. According to composer Alastair Lindsay, Atari allowed Particle Systems to use the name for the 1997 space combat simulation game of the same title. In 2022, a prototype ROM image dating six weeks before release was leaked online.

== Reception ==
Reception

Review scores
Publication	Score
Electronic Gaming Monthly	3.9/10 (Note: Electronic Gaming Monthly's review was by four critics with different ratings: 5.5, 2.5, 3.5, and 4.0.)
M! Games	48%
Next Generation	2/5
Atari Explorer Online	2/5
Atari Fan	78/100
Atari Gaming Headquarters	5/10
Game Zero Magazine	12.5/25
ST-Computer	68%
ST Magazine	58%
VideoGames	5/10

I-War received mixed reception from critics. Electronic Gaming Monthly's four reviewers labelled it as a cross between Cyber Sled and Cybermorph. They highlighted the game's smooth frame rate, responsive controls, and levels, but criticized its dark polygonal graphics, voiceovers, simplistic enemies, and unexciting gameplay. VideoGames regarded it as a "middling attempt at establishing a genre inspired by Jaguar games like Cybermorph and Battlemorph". They also found the game's visuals and gameplay to be inferior to both titles. Next Generation faulted the game's graphical department, lack of innovation, sluggish controls, and gameplay, but commended its soundtrack and two-player deathmatch mode, which they compared to Cyber Sled. German publication ST-Computer gave favorable remarks to the game's music and enemy variety, but panned its low frame rate.

GamePro highlighted the game's variety of viewpoints and two-player mode, but faulted its controls, unimaginative weapons, and flat backgrounds. MAN!AC's Winnie Forster criticized the game's three-dimensional visuals for their abstract polygonal look, as well as the primitive controls and enemy behavior, but noted its two-player mode. Marc Abramson of French ST Magazine compared the game to Cybermorph, particularly its gameplay structure and gouraud-shaded environments, but found the tank to be slower and less maneuverable. Game Zero Magazine's Benjamin expressed fondness for the game's retro feel reminiscent of I, Robot (1984), but saw the occasional slowdown and soundscapes as shortcomings. Atari Gaming Headquarters' Keita Iida wrote: "If I-War expanded upon, or even enhanced the genre established by Cybermorph, we could have dealt with it".

=== Retrospective coverage ===
Retrospective commentary for I-War has been generally favorable. The Atari Times' Chris Donaldson and Rob Longmire considered it a solid and enjoyable title. They commended its polygonal visuals, techno soundtrack, and controls, but found the plot underdeveloped and criticized the slowdown that occurs when too much action is onscreen. They also saw repetitive gameplay as its biggest drawback, citing a lack of replay value. Brett Daly of Jaguar Front Page News (a part of the GameSpy network) praised the game's overall graphical department, upbeat techno music, sound effects, and gameplay, but pointed out its inconsistent frame rate. Author Andy Slaven deemed it one of the least impressive 3D shooters on Jaguar, citing its bland graphics, boring levels and objectives, and awkward controls. Retro Gamer found the game to be more stylish compared to Cybermorph, highlighting its colorful flat-shaded polygons, levels, soundtrack, and bonus stages. They called it a "brillant example of the type of 3D shoot-'em-up that became very popular in the mid-nineties".
