= Carve (video game) =

2004 video game

- North American cover art
- Developer: Argonaut Games
- Publisher: Global Star Software
- Producer: Caspar Field
- Designers: Caspar Field; Steven Taylor
- Programmer: Simon Hargrave
- Artist: Stuart Scott
- Writer: Nic Cusworth
- Platform: Xbox
- Release: NA: February 24, 2004; EU: March 19, 2004
- Genre: Racing
- Modes: Single-player, multiplayer

Carve is a racing video game developed by Argonaut Games. Published by Global Star Software in 2004, The game released as an Xbox exclusive.

Two people play the game simultaneously in which the team travels the world to battle other racing teams on watercraft. The goal is to reach the top rank position. Challenges to players include weather, location and waves. There are eight individual racing styles available with tricks to perform. Carve has split screen options for multiplayer mode, which includes 8 online or system link players and 4 offline players. It is a 480p resolution game with Dolby Digital 5.1 sound. Multiplayer on Xbox Live was available to players until 15 April 2010. Carve is now playable online again on the replacement Xbox Live servers called Insignia.

== Reception ==
Reception

Aggregate score
Aggregator	Score
Metacritic	64/100

Review scores
Publication	Score
Edge	7/10
Electronic Gaming Monthly	6/10 (Note: In Electronic Gaming Monthly's review of the game, one critic gave it 5/10, and the rest gave it each a score of 6.5/10.)
Eurogamer	6/10
Game Informer	6.5/10
GameRevolution	C
GameSpot	6.6/10
GameSpy	3/5
GameZone	6.5/10
IGN	5.5/10
Official Xbox Magazine (US)	7.1/10
TeamXbox	6.9/10
X-Play	3/5

The game received "mixed or average" reviews, according to the review aggregation website Metacritic.
