= Malice (2004 video game) =

2004 video game

- Cover art of Malice
- Developer: Argonaut Games
- Publishers: NA: Mud Duck Productions; EU: Evolved Games
- Producer: Andy Pana
- Writer: Mark Oswin
- Composers: Nick Arondel; Karin Griffin
- Platforms: PlayStation 2 Xbox
- Release: PAL: April 30, 2004 (PS2); NA: June 2, 2004; PAL: August 6, 2004 (Xbox)
- Genre: Platform
- Mode: Single-player

Malice is a platform game developed by Argonaut Games and published by Mud Duck Productions in North America and Evolved Games in Europe, and was released in 2004 for the Xbox and PlayStation 2.

The game's development cycle proved to be quite troublesome, with a change in publishers, cancellation and an eventual revival, the game's planned 2002 release would eventually be delayed to a Summer 2004 release.

Malice was met with mixed reviews.

== Plot ==
The game is about the return of a goddess named Malice, who attempts to defeat the evil Dog God with the help of the Metal Guardian; the Keeper of Universe, who needs to find eight Logic Keys to locate the Dog God.

== Characters ==
- Malice is a redheaded goddess. Malice tried to save her world from the Dog God, an evil villain that seeks to destroy world after world. Malice failed, dying after having her head bitten off by the Dog God. In the afterlife, Malice meets Death, who promptly kicks her out of the underworld, telling her that there is no room for a goddess in the afterlife. Back to life, Malice then meets the Metal Guardian. He tells her that the Dog God is currently attempting to destroy the entire universe, and he needs eight logic keys to track down the god. He finally gives Malice a giant club before sending her off on her quest spanning twenty different worlds.
- The Metal Guardian is a giant clock who sends the newly resurrected Malice on her quest. He holds the knowledge of every and any living thing in the universe, except for Dog God, whom he needs eight logic keys to track. He asks Malice to find these logic keys so he can track down Dog God, which in turn would help Malice exact her revenge and save the universe. Much later in the game, the Guardian admits that he made a bet with the Siren Tree that Malice would only get four of the eight logic keys, only to be proven wrong. The Metal Guardian gives Malice her club, and also offers weapon upgrades and bonus features. After a certain point in the game, he will have a coin around him, unlocking bonus games. Four of these coins appear throughout the course of the game.
- Death appears in the beginning cutscene, finding the recently deceased Malice in the underworld. He informs the amnesiac Malice that she was a goddess, and as a goddess may not be in the underworld. He tells her to leave and settle the score with the Dog God. Death appears if Malice loses all of her hit points, becoming a ghost. Death complains, saying that goddesses are "administrative nightmares."
- The Dog God is Malice's archenemy, and the primary antagonist of the game. He first appears in the beginning cutscene, where he bites off Malice's head. Without eight special logic keys, he cannot be tracked by the Metal Guardian. He travels from world to world, conquering and destroying. His ultimate goal is to destroy the entire universe.

== Development ==
The game was originally intended to be a title for the PlayStation with Fox Interactive appointed to publish the game, and would run on Croc 2's game engine.

After Fox backed out of publishing the game, Argonaut moved development of the title to the Xbox, where it was announced as an exclusive on July 14, 2000, with no date or publisher announced. In August 2001, Argonaut announced that Vivendi Universal Interactive Publishing would publish the game through their subsidiary Sierra On-Line, and that a PlayStation 2 version would also be released.

In May 2002, it was announced that band members from No Doubt would be doing various voice-overs for the game, with singer Gwen Stefani doing the voice for Malice. The game was later shown off at Vivendi Universal's booth at E3 2002. By June, the game was announced to be released in November.

In October 2002, Sierra and Argonaut agreed to delay the game to the Summer of 2003. However, Argonaut's financial issues proved to be troublesome, and in May 2003, it was announced that Vivendi Universal had cancelled their developer contract with Argonaut for the title and they would look into another publisher to publish the title, but in the end, gave back all rights to Argonaut, leaving them to have no choice but to cancel the game.

In January 2004, it was announced that the game was revived after ZeniMax Media subsidiary Mud Duck Productions purchased the publishing rights for the game in North America, with Evolved Games acquiring the European publishing rights a few weeks later. The game was silently released in June 2004 in the United States, and would eventually be Argonaut's final title released, as the company went out of business two months after the Xbox version came out in Europe.

== Reception ==
Reception

Aggregate score
| Aggregator | Score | |
| Aggregator | PS2 | Xbox |
|---|---|---|
| Metacritic | 51/100 | 48/100 |

Review scores
| Publication | Score | |
| Publication | PS2 | Xbox |
|---|---|---|
| Electronic Gaming Monthly | 4.67/10 | 4.67/10 |
| Game Informer | N/A | 5.5/10 |
| GamePro | N/A | 2/5 |
| GameSpot | 5/10 | 5/10 |
| IGN | 5.8/10 | 5.8/10 |
| Official U.S. PlayStation Magazine | 2.5/5 | N/A |
| Official Xbox Magazine (US) | N/A | 3.5/10 |
| PlayStation: The Official Magazine | 6/10 | N/A |
| TeamXbox | N/A | 4.9/10 |
| X-Play | N/A | 2/5 |

The PlayStation 2 version of Malice received "mixed" reviews, while the Xbox version received "generally unfavorable reviews", according to the review aggregation website Metacritic. Henry Ernst of GamePro Germany compared the finished game to Angela Merkel in a Bikini.
