= Christopher Mann (composer) =

British music composer

Christopher Mann (born 1965) is a British composer and began his career by contributing to independent films such as Hard Grit. He founded an audio production company in 1997 called Mann Music specialising in music and sound for video games and other media.

In 2001, Mann received a BAFTA nomination as composer and producer of the score for Independence War 2: Edge of Chaos. In 2005, Mann worked with Aardman Animations and David Braben on the game score for Wallace & Gromit: The Curse of the Were-Rabbit. In 2007 he scored Braben's The Outsider. He has also worked with games by Lucas Arts, Konami, and Ubisoft.
