= Self Simulated =

2025 video game

- Developer: 2nd Law Games
- Publisher: WW: ModRetro
- Platform: Game Boy Color
- Release: WW: July 10, 2025
- Genre: platform
- Mode: Single-player

Self Simulated is a 2025 platform game developed by independent developer Martin Cremerius-Gauer (2nd Law Games) and published by ModRetro for its Chromatic retro handheld console, and also backwards compatible with the Nintendo Game Boy Color. A physical cartridge version of the game was released for the Chromatic in 2025, with a digital release being planned for Steam in 2027.

== Gameplay ==
Self Simulated is a two-dimensional platforming game characterized by precision controls and split-second timing. Players control a nameless, amnesiac android in an AI-operated facility, tasked with completing a number of platforming challenges while avoiding various fatal obstacles ("glitches") and enemies (other robotic entities). Whenever the android is killed, its memory is 'resynced' to a new robotic body, granting the players an unlimited number of attempts to complete each level. As players progress through the game's levels, they unlock new abilities, such as double jump, dash attack, stomp and wall jump. Cremerius-Gauer has cited games like Celeste and Katana Zero as influences for the design of Self Simulated's precision platforming gameplay.

To counterbalance the game's reliance on split-second timing and reflexes, players can opt to enable several "assist settings", designed to make the game more accessible to newcomers and users with various types of impairments, without compromising the core experience. Such settings include an "anti-glitch" mode (where the player's android can freely move through otherwise fatal "glitch" areas and platforms), auto-stomp (the player automatically performing a stomp jump without having to press the corresponding input buttons to perform the move), infinite jumping, etc. Upon finishing the game's "Normal Mode", players unlock "Speedrun" and "Hardcore" modes, introducing less narrative elements and focusing on speed and increased challenge respectively. The game also features an "Insane" mode, which disables the autosave feature, and forces players to complete the entire game in one perfect run.

== Release and reception ==
Reception

Review scores
Publication	Score
Nintendo World Report	9/10
Retro Dodo	8.5/10
Daily Nintendo	4/5 stars

Self Simulated was released on July 10, 2025, as a new title for the ModRetro Chromatic alongside four other games announced together with the console's permanent restock.

Since its release, reception for Self Simulated has been highly positive. In a mini review article covering all the games released by ModRetro on July 10, 2025, Willem Hilhorst of Nintendo World Report gave Self Simulated a 9/10 score, calling it "some of the most fun I’ve had on Nintendo’s handheld in quite some time". Independent online magazine Retro Dodo similarly awarded the game an 8.5 out of 10 score, calling the game "brilliant", with the only criticism being that "it isn't the longest game in the world", leaving them wanting more. Whilst calling the game's story "forgettable", Jorden Bakker of Daily Nintendo gave Self Simulated four out of five stars, highly praising its gameplay, calling its precision controls "impressive for a device on par with the Game Boy Color", and finding the game well worth getting for the gameplay alone.
