= Argonaut Games =

British video game developer

- Formerly: Argonaut Software Limited (1982–1999)
- Type: Public limited company
- Industry: Video games
- Founded: 23 February 1982; 44 years ago in Colindale, London (original); 28 August 2024; 2 years ago (relaunch)
- Founder: Jez San
- Defunct: 1 October 2004; 22 years ago (original)
- Fate: Liquidated (original incarnation)
- Headquarters: Edgware, London, UK (original); Frisco, TX, USA (relaunch)
- Key people: Gary Sheinwald (co-CEO); Mike Arkin (co-CEO)
- Divisions: Argonaut Sheffield (2002–2004)
- Subsidiaries: A/N Software Inc. (49%; joint venture with Nintendo); Morpheme Ltd; Just Add Monsters (2000–2004); LTStudios Ltd (2002–2004)
- Website: argonautgames.com

Argonaut Games is a British video game developer founded in 1982 by Jez San. It was known for the Super NES video game Star Fox and its supporting Super FX chip, and for Croc: Legend of the Gobbos and the Starglider series. The company was liquidated in late 2004, and ceased to exist in early 2007. It was relaunched in 2024.

== History ==
I told them that this is as good as it's going to get unless they let us design some hardware to make the SNES better at 3D. Amazingly, even though I had never done any hardware before, they said YES, and gave me a million bucks to make it happen.

— Argonaut founder and Super FX codesigner, Jez San

Argonaut Software was founded by teenager Jez San in September 1982, though his first game, Skyline Attack for the Commodore 64, was released before the company was officially formed. the company name is a play on his name and the mythological story of Jason and the Argonauts. Its head offices were in Colindale, London and a U.S. branch was located in Woodside, California in the San Francisco Bay Area.

In 1986, the company released Starglider for the Atari ST and Amiga. It is widely considered to be the first 3D video game.

In 1990, Argonaut collaborated with Nintendo during the early years of the NES and SNES, a notable incident being when Argonaut submitted a proof-of-concept method of defeating the Game Boy's copyright protection mechanism to Nintendo. Argonaut's star programmer Dylan Cuthbert, alongside Nintendo, developed the Japan-only space combat simulation game X for the Game Boy in 1992. The game was notable for being one of the few 3D games on the console. An English version called Lunar Chase was developed but ultimately cancelled.

The combined efforts from Argonaut and Nintendo yielded a prototype of the game Star Fox, initially codenamed "nesGlider" and inspired by Starglider. The demo was then ported to the SNES. This ultimately became Star Fox, with Nintendo EAD handling design and Argonaut in charge of programming. Three programmers, including Cuthbert, were assigned to work on the game in Japan.

In order to improve performance from the demo, Nintendo commissioned Argonaut to design custom hardware to give the SNES true 3D capability. San hired chip designers and made the Super FX RISC processor. They originally codenamed it the Mathematical Argonaut Rotation I/O, or "MARIO", as is printed on the chip's surface. The chip was so powerful that Argonaut developers joked the Super NES was just a box to hold the chip.

After building the Super FX, Argonaut designed several different chips for other companies' video game machines, which were never released. These include machines codenamed GreenPiece and CD-I 2 for Philips, the platform codenamed VeggieMagic for Apple and Toshiba, and Hasbro's "virtual reality" game system codenamed MatriArc. Additionally, Argonaut built a full-color virtual reality headset for Nintendo, called Super Visor, before the Virtual Boy was developed. After receiving an investment from LSI Logic, Argonaut was commissioned to design a chip for a potential PlayStation 2 design.

Argonaut had a three-game deal with Nintendo, leading to the creation of Stunt Race FX. Cuthbert also worked on Star Fox 2, which would have introduced more open gameplay and multiple playable characters. The game was mostly completed by 1995, and an updated Super FX chip was designed, but Nintendo ultimately cancelled it due to the emergence of 32-bit consoles. The game was finally released in 2017 on the Super NES Classic Edition.

In 1996, John Edelson was hired as the company General Manager. He ran the group for two years, reorganizing the company, cutting costs, and streamlining operations. Capital was raised in 1996–1998 from Tom Teichman and Apax Partners. According to Jez San, Argonaut remained an independent developer by choice, and had turned down several buyout offers.

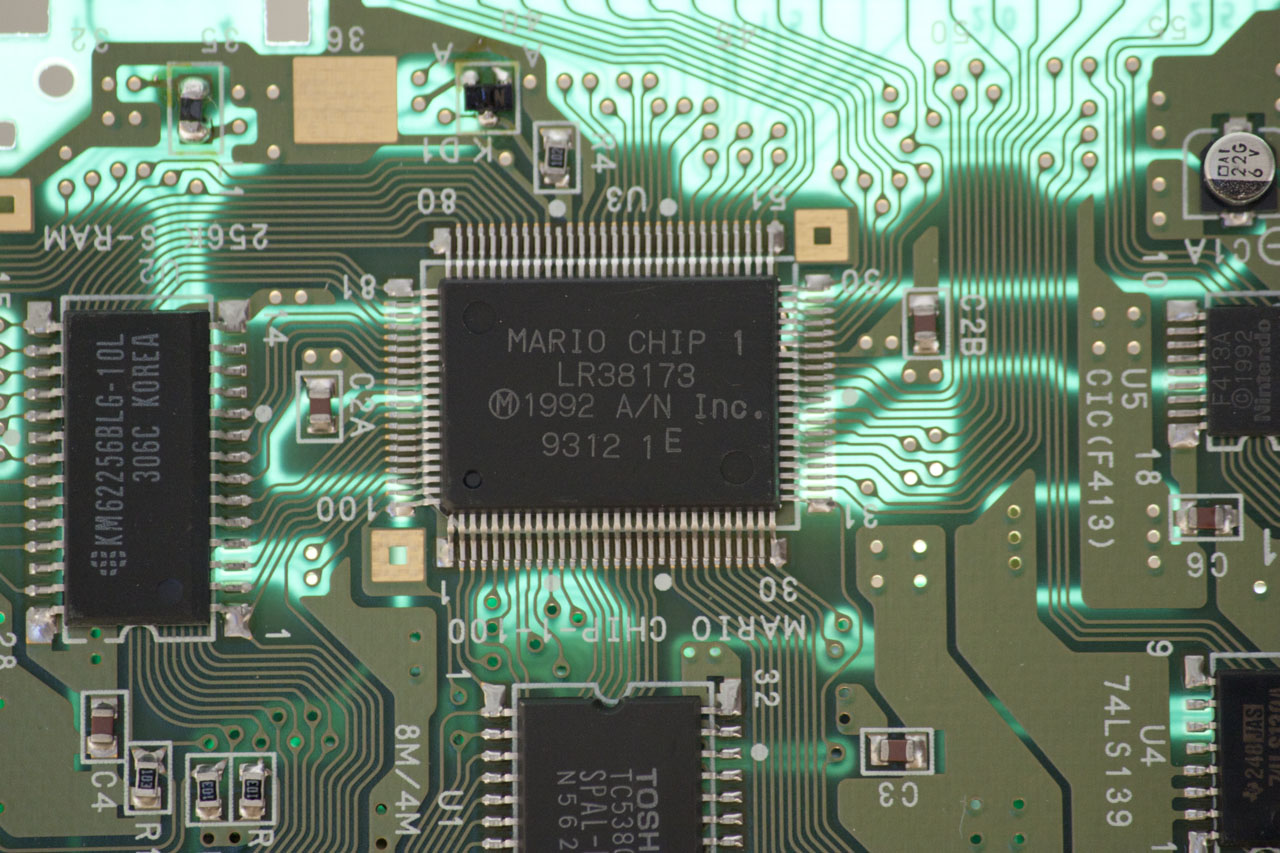
The Super FX chip inside a PAL cartridge of Starwing, both developed by Argonaut.

In 1997, the company was moved to a new building in Edgware. It had about 120 employees at this time. In September 1997, Croc: Legend of the Gobbos was released by Fox Interactive for the PlayStation and Sega Saturn. A PC version of the game was also later released in 1998. The game had previously been pitched to Nintendo as a 3D Yoshi game.

In 1998, Argonaut Software was split into Argonaut Technologies Limited (ATL) and Argonaut Software Limited (ASL). With space being a premium at the office on Colindale Avenue, ATL was relocated to an office in the top floor of a separate building. The building was called Capitol House on Capitol Way, just around the corner. There, it continued the design of CPU and GPU products and maintained "BRender", Argonaut's proprietary software 3D engine.

In 1998, ATL was rebranded ARC after the name of its main product, the Argonaut RISC Core, and became an independent company under founder Rob Clucas and CEO Bob Terwilliger.

Argonaut Software Limited became Argonaut Games and was listed on the London Stock Exchange in 2000. Intended to be a tie-in game for the 1997 movie, Alien Resurrection spent four years in development before it was released in 2000. The game had been a top-down shooter and third-person shooter before ultimately being released as a first-person shooter. In 2000, the company purchased the recently-founded Just Add Monsters. It also acquired the UK-based LTStudios in 2001 to work on PlayStation 2 games.

In 2001, Argonaut developed Harry Potter and the Sorcerer's Stone for Electronic Arts. The game was well received and went on to sell eight million units by 2003. It purchased Particle Systems, a two-person development team in Sheffield, in January 2002.

The company's last game proved to be Malice for PlayStation 2 and Xbox. It was originally expected to be released in 2002 by Vivendi, but spent six years in development. It was cancelled by Argonaut in 2003. At the same time, the cancellation and delay of several other projects put the company in financial distress. Malice was later picked up by ZeniMax Media in 2004 and quietly released that June.

In October 2004, Argonaut Games halted trading on the London Stock Exchange. It called in receivers David Rubin & Partners, placed its subsidiaries Argonaut Software into administration, and put them up for sale. The studio in Sheffield was closed. San resigned from the board of directors and purchased subsidiaries Just Add Monsters and Morpheme. With no buyer for Argonaut Software, all remaining employees were laid off. Just Add Monsters became Ninja Theory in November.

Studio leaders went on to form Rocksteady Studios and many former employees would join the developer. Argonaut was officially dissolved in 2007.

=== Reopening (2024–present) ===
On 28 August 2024, Jez San reopened Argonaut Games as a boutique publisher that would focus on re-releasing and remastering Argonaut's existing franchises alongside the publication of third-party independent titles. Its first release is a remaster of Croc: Legend of the Gobbos, which had previously been teased by San the previous year.

On 25 September 2024, Argonaut announced it had made a strategic investment in Ancient Machine, the developer of the forthcoming PC narco-thriller VICE Undercover.

== BRender ==
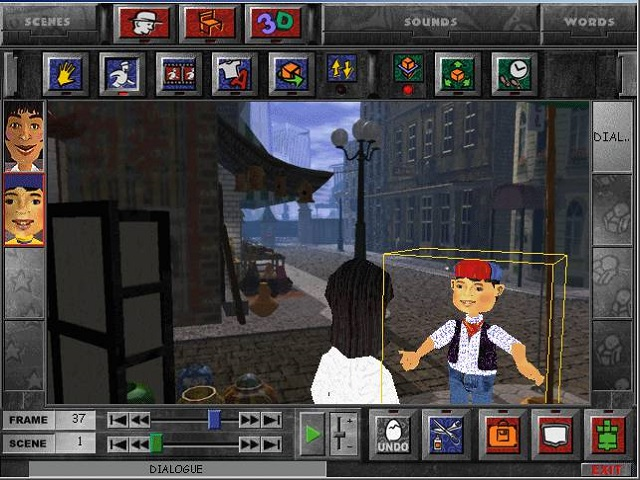
3D Movie Maker, developed by Microsoft, runs on BRender.

BRender (abbreviation of "Blazing Renderer") is a development toolkit and a realtime 3D graphics engine for computer games, simulators, and graphic tools. It was developed and licensed by Argonaut Software. The engine supports Intel's MMX instruction set and Windows, MS-DOS, and PlayStation platforms. Support for 3D hardware graphics accelerator cards was added. Software made with BRender includes Carmageddon, Croc: Legend of the Gobbos, FX Fighter, I-War, and 3D Movie Maker. It was released as free and open-source software under the MIT License on 3 May 2022.

== Titles ==
=== Games developed ===
Year	Title	Platform(s)	Publisher(s)	Note(s)
1984	Skyline Attack	Commodore 64	Century Software	
1986	Starglider	Atari ST, Amiga	Rainbird	
1988	Starglider 2	Atari ST, Amiga	Rainbird	
1990	Days of Thunder	MS-DOS	Mindscape	
1992	Days of Thunder	Game Boy	Mindscape	
1992	Race Drivin' (Note: Race Drivin' was ported from the arcade.)	Game Boy	THQ	
1992	A.T.A.C.	Microsoft Windows	MicroProse	
1992	Birds of Prey	Amiga, MS-DOS	Electronic Arts	
1992	X	Game Boy	Nintendo	Co-developed with Nintendo R&D1
1993	Star Fox	Super NES	Nintendo	Co-developed with Nintendo EAD (Note: Argonaut Games provided assistance in programming with the FX Chip.)
1993	King Arthur's World	Super NES	Jaleco	
1994	Vortex	Super NES	Electro Brain, Pack-In-Video, Sony Imagesoft	
1994	Stunt Race FX	Super NES	Nintendo	Co-developed with Nintendo EAD
1994	Creature Shock	MS-DOS	Virgin Interactive Entertainment	
1994	The Ren & Stimpy Show: Fire Dogs	Super NES	THQ	
1995	FX Fighter	MS-DOS	GTE Entertainment	
1995	Alien Odyssey	MS-DOS	Philips Media	
1995	Scooby-Doo Mystery	Super NES	Acclaim Entertainment	
1996	FX Fighter Turbo	MS-DOS	GTE Entertainment	
1997	Croc: Legend of the Gobbos	PlayStation, Sega Saturn, Microsoft Windows	Fox Interactive	
1998	Buck Bumble	Nintendo 64	Ubi Soft	
1999	Croc 2	PlayStation, Microsoft Windows	Fox Interactive	
2000	Croc	Game Boy Color	THQ	Co-developed with Virtucraft
2000	Red Dog: Superior Firepower	Dreamcast	Sega, Crave Entertainment	
2000	The Emperor's New Groove	PlayStation, Microsoft Windows	Sony Computer Entertainment, Disney Interactive	
2000	Disney's Aladdin in Nasira's Revenge	PlayStation, Microsoft Windows	Sony Computer Entertainment, Disney Interactive	
2000	Alien Resurrection	PlayStation	Fox Interactive	
2001	Harry Potter and the Philosopher's Stone (Note: Known as Harry Potter and the Sorcerer's Stone in North America.)	PlayStation	Electronic Arts	
2002	Harry Potter and the Chamber of Secrets	PlayStation	Electronic Arts	
2002	Bionicle: Matoran Adventures	Game Boy Advance	Electronic Arts, Lego Interactive	
2003	Bionicle	PlayStation 2, GameCube, Xbox, Microsoft Windows	Electronic Arts, Lego Interactive	Co-developed with Argonaut Sheffield
2003	SWAT: Global Strike Team	PlayStation 2, Xbox	Vivendi Universal Games	
2003	I-Ninja	PlayStation 2, GameCube, Xbox	Namco Hometek, Sony Computer Entertainment	
2004	I-Ninja	Microsoft Windows	Zoo Digital Publishing	
2004	Carve	Xbox	Global Star Software	
2004	Malice	PlayStation 2, Xbox	Evolved Games, Mud Duck Productions	
2004	Powerdrome	PlayStation 2, Xbox	Evolved Games, Mud Duck Productions	Additional development for Argonaut Sheffield
2004	Catwoman: The Game	PlayStation 2, GameCube, Xbox, Microsoft Windows	Electronic Arts	
2017 (Note: Star Fox 2 was originally planned for release on SNES in 1996 (build date: 12 September 1995). However, the game was not officially released until 2017 when it was included in the Super NES Classic Edition.)	Star Fox 2	SNES Classic Edition	Nintendo	Co-developed with Nintendo EAD

=== Games published ===
Year	Title	Platform(s)	Developer(s)	Note(s)
2025	Croc: Legend of the Gobbos (remaster)	Microsoft Windows, PlayStation 4, PlayStation 5, Xbox One, Xbox Series X/S, Nintendo Switch, Nintendo Switch 2	Titanium Studios and Big Boat Interactive	
2025	Croc: 25th Anniversary Edition	Game Boy Color	Virtucraft, Argonaut Games	Physical re-release through ModRetro, digital release platforms currently unconfirmed
2026	Croc 2: 25th Anniversary Edition	Game Boy Color	Natsume Co., Ltd., Argonaut Games	Physical re-release through ModRetro
2026	Buck Bumble	Nintendo 64	Argonaut Games	Physical re-release through ModRetro
2026	Croc 2: Kingdom of the Gobbos (remaster)	Microsoft Windows, PlayStation 4, PlayStation 5, Xbox Series X/S, Nintendo Switch, Nintendo Switch 2	Titanium Studios	

=== Cancelled games ===
Cancelled games by Argonaut Games
Title	Development period	Platform
8-Kings	—N/a	N-Gage
Crash vs. Spyro Racing	2004	Xbox
Orchid	2003	PlayStation 2, GameCube, Xbox
Bionicle: City of Legends	2004	PlayStation 2, Xbox
I-Ninja 2	2004	PlayStation 2, GameCube, Xbox
Zero Hour	2004	PlayStation 2, PSP
Cash on Delivery		PlayStation 2
Kanaan		PC
Unnamed Yoshi game	1995	Nintendo 64
Transformers: Generation 2	1994	Super NES
