= Powerdrome =

1988 video game

- Publisher(s): Electronic Arts
- Designer(s): Michael Powell
- Platform(s): Atari ST, Amiga, MS-DOS
- Release: 1988: Atari ST; 1989: Amiga; 1990: MS-DOS
- Genre(s): Racing
- Mode(s): Single-player, multiplayer

Powerdrome is a 1988 futuristic racing video game by Michael Powell released on the Atari ST and published by Electronic Arts. Players race jet-engined, anti-gravity bikes called blades around closed tracks. Ports for Amiga and MS-DOS were released in 1989 and 1990 respectively. A remake was released in 2004.

== Gameplay ==
The game includes six tracks, set across five planets. The road-equivalent turning method of yaw is not present, meaning a right turn is achieved by rolling to the right and pitching up. Control is sensitive, but allows use of the mouse for greater accuracy. Gameplay is complicated by the need to equip gas filters to cope with each planet's atmosphere and weather, with further choices to be made over types of fuel.

Control was improved for the Amiga release in 1989 and an extra track made available. A version on the PC in 1990 was soon followed by a re-release on all formats.

== Reception ==
Released as a budget game, Powerdrome received good reviews, with a few remembering the original and its influence on the futuristic racing genre. All were impressed with the smooth sensation of speed and detailed environments, although the music was considered lackluster and the pilots' voices annoying.
