= Red Dog: Superior Firepower =

2000 video game

- Developer: Argonaut Games
- Publishers: PAL: Sega; NA: Crave Entertainment
- Producer: Nick Clarke
- Designer: Sefton Hill
- Programmers: Matt Godbolt; Matthew Porter; Saviz Izadpanah
- Platform: Dreamcast
- Release: PAL: April 21, 2000; NA: October 31, 2000
- Genre: Shooter
- Modes: Single-player, multiplayer

Red Dog: Superior Firepower, also known as simply Red Dog, is a shooter game released in 2000 for the Sega Dreamcast; it was developed by Argonaut Games.

== Gameplay ==
The game is composed of six single-player missions, seven challenge missions, and numerous combinations of game types and maps in multi-player mode. The player controls the Red Dog, an armored all-terrain assault vehicle to fight the Haak, an alien race that has invaded Earth.

== Development ==
Red Dog was one of the first third party titles developed for the Dreamcast outside of Japan. Jez San, the Managing Director of Argonaut Games, stated that Sega referred to them, No Cliché (developers of Toy Commander), Bizarre Creations (Fur Fighters), Red Lemon (Take the Bullet and The Simpsons: Bug Squad, both unreleased) and Appaloosa Interactive (Ecco the Dolphin: Defender of the Future) as their "1.5 party developers, in reference to the fact that we were treated like in-house developers and given access to the early devkits....warts n' all!". He told GameFan magazine that when Sega approached them to develop for the Dreamcast "we asked our artists to go to town on what they thought a next-gen game might look like" with "no limits on the number of polygons and CPU power used and we then set about trying to faithfully reproduce that vision in reality".

San described their intent in designing the gameplay as "kinda Quake, meets Battlezone meets Star Fox...in a tank".

On the 26th of September 2022 the game's source code was released by the developers and published on the open source platform GitHub.

== Reception ==
Reception

Aggregate score
Aggregator	Score
Metacritic	73/100

Review scores
Publication	Score
AllGame	3/5
CNET Gamecenter	8/10
Electronic Gaming Monthly	7.67/10 (Note: In Electronic Gaming Monthly's review of the game, two critics gave it each a score of 8/10, and the other gave it 7/10.)
EP Daily	8.5/10
Game Informer	7.75/10
GameFan	89%
GameSpot	6.3/10
IGN	8.2/10
Jeuxvideo.com	12/20
Next Generation	3/5

The game received "mixed or average reviews" according to the review aggregation website Metacritic. Jim Preston of NextGen called it "A fun, colorful 3D take on Moon Patrol that is best when played with some friends." Four-Eyed Dragon of GamePro said, "Red Dog may look and sound strong, but with poor controls, its bite is far from threatening. The only thing saving this canine from the kennel is its huge complement of multiplayer games for up to four people." (Note: GamePro gave the game two 4.5/5 scores for graphics and sound, 2/5 for control, and 3/5 for fun factor.)
