= ModRetro =

Electronics company based in California

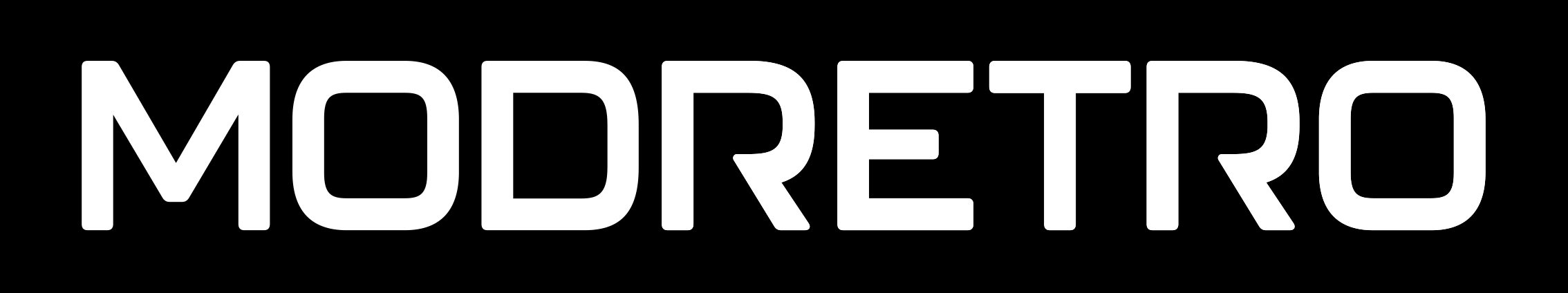
- Logo used since 2023

- Chromatic, the company's flagship console
- Type: Private
- Industry: Video games; Electronics
- Founded: 2023
- Founders: Palmer Luckey; Torin Herndon
- Headquarters: United States
- Key people: Torin Herndon (CEO)
- Products: Chromatic, M64
- Website: https://modretro.com

ModRetro is an American consumer electronics company founded by Palmer Luckey and Torin Herndon. It is best known for the Chromatic, a retro handheld console inspired by the Game Boy Color, and the M64, a recreation of the Nintendo 64.

It also operates an independent game studio, responsible for first-party development and publishing of external titles.

== History ==
=== Online forum (2009-present) ===
In 2009, Palmer Luckey and several others founded internet forum ModRetro, for the discussion of retro consoles and hardware modding. The community became notable for the practice of "portablization", modifying home consoles to convert them to handheld game consoles.

As of 2026, the community still exists, however the website is largely inactive.

=== Consumer electronics (2023-present) ===
In 2023, Palmer Luckey and Torin Herndon re-established ModRetro as a hardware company. (Note: "The Future Is Retro" . ModRetro.)

Torin Herndon previously worked as an engineer at Oculus and Anduril, companies also founded by Palmer Luckey. Following the revival of ModRetro as a hardware company, Herndon joined Luckey as a co-founder and helped oversee the development of the Chromatic handheld and the company's expansion into game publishing and hardware manufacturing.

In June 2024, ModRetro announced the Chromatic, a handheld console inspired by the Game Boy Color. (Note: https://modretro.com/) The system uses open-source components from the MiSTer FPGA project.

In July 2025, ModRetro permanently restocked the Chromatic after the initial First Edition sold out. The relaunch introduced additional color variants, optional Gorilla Glass models, new accessories, and additional game releases. In December 2025, ModRetro released a version of the Chromatic made from the same metal as Anduril attack drones

In 2025, ModRetro announced the M64, an FPGA-based recreation of the Nintendo 64. The console is planned for release in 2026.

Later in 2025, ModRetro participated in several promotional collaborations with other companies and media personalities. One of the most widely reported events was a partnership with the Goodyear Tire and Rubber Company and GameStop to commemorate the 100th anniversary of the Goodyear Blimp. The event featured a Pokémon battle played on ModRetro Chromatic handhelds aboard the blimp and included participation from Palmer Luckey and YouTuber Casey Neistat.

The collaboration also included a limited-edition Chromatic giveaway produced jointly by ModRetro and Goodyear.

In March 2026, multiple publications reported that ModRetro was seeking new funding at a valuation of approximately $1 billion.

== Reception ==
ModRetro's hardware has been covered by several media outlets, including The Verge, Vice, Wired, Popular Mechanics, and GamesRadar+.

== Games and publishing ==
ModRetro publishes new titles and reissues games in physical cartridge format.

Platform	Category	Title	Year	Ref
Chromatic (Note: Compatible with Game Boy Color systems.)	Original	Dragonyhm	2024	
Chromatic	Original	Patchy Matchy	2024	
Chromatic	Original	In The Dark 2	2024	
Chromatic	Original	Traumatarium Penitent	2025	
Chromatic	Original	Hermano	2025	
Chromatic	Original	Chantey	2025	
Chromatic	Original	Gravitorque DX	2025	
Chromatic	Original	Wicked Plague	2025	
Chromatic	Original	Self Simulated	2025	
Chromatic	Original	First Contact Protocol	2025	
Chromatic	Original	Tales of Monsterland DX	2025	
Chromatic	Original	Buck and the Cursed Cartridge	2025	
Chromatic	Re-release	Toki Tori - Ultimate Edition	2024	
Chromatic	Re-release	Rayman	2024	
Chromatic	Re-release	Croc: 25th Anniversary Edition	2024	(Note: https://modretro.com/collections/re-released-classics)
Chromatic	Re-release	Baby T-Rex	2025	
Chromatic	Re-release	Project S-11	2025	
Chromatic	Re-release	Sabrina: The Animated Series - Zapped!	2025	
Chromatic	Re-release	Atari '90s Rewind Collection	2025	
Chromatic	Re-release	Croc 2: 25th Anniversary Edition	2026	
Chromatic	Re-release	Chikyū Kaihō Gun ZAS	2026	

== M64 ==
The ModRetro M64 is an FPGA-based home console designed to play Nintendo 64 cartridges on modern displays. It was released on July 28, 2026, in four colorways; Clear, Purple, Green and AMD Red. On August 21, 2026, ModRetro released the limited-edition "Smoke" colorway M64 and Trident controller, exclusively sold at GameStop.

The console includes four original-style controller ports, HDMI output, three USB-C ports, and a microSD card slot.

According to ModRetro, the M64 features wireless over-the-air updates, fanless cooling, and support for 4K output.

ModRetro additionally launched a re-release of four Nintendo 64 game titles to debut with the M64: Xeno Crisis, Xibalba 64, Extreme-G: Turbo Fusion (Extreme G and Extreme G XG2 combined), and Buck Bumble.
