= Subwar 2050 =

1993 video game

- Developer: Particle Systems
- Publisher: Interplay Entertainment
- Designer: Michael Powell
- Platforms: Amiga, MS-DOS, CD32, Windows
- Release: 1993: MS-DOS; 1995: Amiga, CD32
- Genre: Submarine simulator
- Mode: Single-player

Subwar 2050 is a futuristic 3D submarine simulator video game developed by Particle Systems, designed by Michael Powell, and published by MicroProse in 1993.

== Gameplay ==
The game includes four campaigns that take place in North Atlantic, Antarctic, the Sea of Japan and the South China Sea.

== Publication history ==
The game was released in 1993 for MS-DOS and 1994 for Amiga and CD32. In 1994 an expansion pack, Subwar 2050: The Plot Deepens was released for MS-DOS. Subwar 2050 was sold to Interplay Entertainment on 27 March 2009. In 2013 Subwar 2050 was released on Gog.com for XP/Vista/Windows 7 and is available for download.

== Reception ==
Reception

Review score
Publication	Score
Edge	7/10

Computer Gaming World in April 1994 said that "SubWar 2050 is a product with an identity crisis. It wants to incorporate sophisticated physical models of the type you'd expect from a true simulation, and yet it wants to have an action game's visuals and pace", citing its including thermal layers, making them "largely irrelevant" with visual-oriented combat, then only providing unsophisticated short-range torpedoes. In 1994, PC Gamer UK named SubWar 2050 the 18th best computer game of all time. The editors called it "a game that will appeal to almost everyone."

== See also ==
- List of underwater science fiction works
