= Powerdrome (2004 video game) =

Power Drome
- Developer: Argonaut Sheffield (Note: Ported to Windows by Second Intention.)
- Publishers: NA: Mud Duck Productions; EU: Evolved Games; EU: Zoo Digital Publishing (Windows)
- Platforms: Windows; PlayStation 2 Xbox
- Release: NA: 15 June 2004; EU: 29 October 2004 (PS2 and Xbox); EU: 11 August 2005 (PC)
- Genre: Racing

Power Drome is a 2004 racing video game developed by Argonaut Sheffield. It is a remake of the 1988 game Powerdrome.

== Gameplay ==
Power Drome supports single-player and split-screen game modes. The Xbox version of the game also includes online multiplayer via Xbox Live, until the termination of Xbox Live for original Xbox games on April 15, 2010. Power Drome is now playable on the replacement online servers for the Xbox called Insignia.

== Development ==
The game was announced in May 2003. Mud Duck Productions published the game in North America. It was released in Europe in April 2004. Powerdrome designer Michael Powell was involved in the project.

== Reception ==
Reception

Review scores
Publication	Score
GameSpot	7.9/10 (Xbox)
IGN	5.1/10
Jeuxvideo	10/20 (PS2)
TeamXbox	7.3/10 (Xbox)

IGN said "The only reason to pick up Powerdrome is that you really wanted some sci-fi racer and needed that itch scratched. It's been bugging you even though there are plenty of other games on the market and, man, you just need it. But really, even though Powerdrome rewards racing skills, it doesn't deserve the effort. Save your energy for a deeper racing title".

TeamXbox said "For those players looking for an in-depth driving-sim, this is certainly not the place to look. But for those players in need of a straight-forward title, at an affordable cost ($29.99), Powerdrome is certainly willing to fit the bill".
