= Buck Bumble =

1998 video game

- European Nintendo 64 cover art
- Developer: Argonaut Software
- Publisher: Ubi Soft
- Producer: Nick Clarke
- Designer: Simon Keating
- Programmer: Carl Graham
- Composer: Justin Scharvona
- Platform: Nintendo 64
- Release: NA: 20 November 1998; UK: 4 December 1998
- Genre: Third-person shooter
- Modes: Single-player, multiplayer

Buck Bumble is a 3D third-person shooter video game developed by Argonaut Software, that was published in 1998 by UbiSoft for the Nintendo 64. The game's premise centers around a war of two factions of anthropomorphic insects, created as a result of a chemical spill in London. The game received lukewarm reviews at release, even positive ones mentioning technical shortcomings. However the soundtrack and its main theme, both composed by Justin Scharvona, were praised after release, and it's enjoyed a modern resurgence of popularity, despite the game's otherwise relative obscurity.

== Gameplay ==
Buzz Ball, a football-like game, is one of the multiplayer modes.

The game features 3D graphics, with the camera being fixed behind the titular Buck Bumble in missions, of which there are nineteen. A mission consists of fulfilling some objective, like destroying Herd radar dishes, which when completed immediately triggers a teleportation animation that leads to a level summary and save screen. The top of the in-mission screen displays a radar used to locate enemies within the level, a damage metre, the currently equipped weapon, and in the bottom right corner, the current mission objective. Buck can be armed with up to eleven different weapons, such as a stun gun, laser or rocket launcher.

While levels are height-restricted, that is essentially the only movement restriction placed on the player outside of world geometry, as they are able to freely fly in the air or walk around to complete the premade levels. Some levels are split up into multiple distinct locations that the player has to reach by passing through teleporters, or gates. Points of interest in levels are mission objectives, weapons, nectar from flowers to regain energy, and bonus points. Several of the enemies in levels such as beetles and wasps have special generators that release another enemy when the first enemy is defeated. This requires the player to destroy the generator itself to defeat the enemies and clear the stage. The levels also feature stage hazards, such as water where the player can drown if submerged for more than a couple of seconds.

=== Multiplayer ===
Buck Bumble has two multiplayer modes. The first, Buck Battle, allows up to two players to engage in an airborne dog-fight deathmatch on a preset map. The second is a football-style game called Buzz Ball. The goal is to hit a giant football into the opposing player's net, while still fighting with each other. In the latter mode, players are able to use two weapons from the game: a simple zapper, which gently moves the ball along, and a rocket launcher, which sends the ball flying.

== Plot ==
The game takes place in the surroundings of a chemical factory in London, England, after a chemical spill has caused insects in the surrounding area to mutate. Several different types of these mutated insects gather together and become the evil "Herd", that are determined to take over the garden, and eventually the whole world. The game casts the player as Buck Bumble, a volunteer bumblebee that is implanted with cyborg technology. He is part of an organization known as "The Resistance", which is trying to stop the Herd Army. Buck's missions send him on multiple tasks, such as defending the resistance base, attacking Herd supply lines while travelling through sewers, and eventually fighting the Herd's mantis-like Queen.

== Development ==
The companion "Buck Bumble Pack" made by Joy Tech

The game was built with the rumble feature in mind, allowing the player to feel the impact of getting hit, with the intention of increasing the sense of realism. This feature was capitalised on by Joy Tech, which made an official "Buck Bumble Pack" that was sold in the UK with the game at Dixons and Currys, however it was a third-party peripheral not licensed by Nintendo. According to the lead programmer Carl Graham, the game started out as a test of a flight simulator made by him for fun, before it "evolved into a flying bee, and the horror we know as Buck Bumble today was born".

The soundtrack was composed by Justin Scharvona and is entirely in the genre of speed garage because he wanted to "go for something that [stylistically fit] in with the futuristic, and [something] not cutesy, something a bit harder". As both techno and jungle were considered overdone, speed garage was picked as it was "funkier than house and garage".

== Reception ==
Many contemporary critiques of the game criticized the graphics, specifically the heavy fog, which was a consequence of rendering restrictions

The theme song to Buck Bumble has become a popular internet meme through remixing. TheGamer described the cultural peception of Bumble as being "that one game with the great theme song".

Reception

Aggregate score
Aggregator	Score
GameRankings	70.12%

Review scores
Publication	Score
Electronic Gaming Monthly	6.62/10
GamePro	4/5
GameSpot	5.2/10
IGN	7.2/10
N64 Magazine	8.5/10
Next Generation	3/5
Nintendo Power	8.2/10
Official Nintendo Magazine	84%
64 Magazine	9.2/10
Q64 (magazine)	8/10
Total 64	9.0/10

While praised to some extent, it was widely regarded as below contemporary Nintendo 64 standards and Buck Bumble was met with generally reserved positive reception from gaming critics. The repeated criticisms by outlets like Australia's N64 Gamer or IGN was it's overreliance on poor looking performance saving techniques, like the harsh distance fog and low resolution textures, while still having sub-par frame rates, while considering the game as generally too easy. IGN's Matt Casamassina specifically called it "the epitome of 'first generation' Nintendo 64 products" and compared it to a lower-quality version of the bee level in Banjo-Kazooie, though still talking positively of aspects of the game like the flying controls, the design of Buck, and the addictiveness of the Buzz Ball multiplayer mode. Narayan Pattison of the N64 Gamer compared the game to Star Fox, which was also partly developed by Argonaut Software, which is similar in theme of flying player characters, praising the design decision to allow the player a greater degree of control, as opposed to Star Fox's preset on rails movement, while also calling the main theme a "very catchy dance beat that even has clear vocals."

Fabian Blache, III, of Dimension Publishing's Q64 magazine, compared the game's shooter style to the PlayStation game WarHawk, praising the sound and graphics and excused the pressence of the fog because the game was "set in England".

GameSpot's Lauren Fielder gave the title a significantly lower review than most publishers as it "missed the boat [of lower-quality first-generation N64 games]". She criticized the flying and walking controls and deemed the multiplayer modes "seemingly quite literally thrown in."

=== Modern revival of soundtrack ===
In recent years, Buck Bumble has gained a large cult following for its theme music. An unofficial YouTube upload of the song uploaded in 2008 has attained 18 million views, and meme videos mashing up the song with other video games have proven popular. Joshua Wolens of PC Gamer described the game as a "banger" and a potential reboot as a "triumph [of] human spirit" while also admitting they were only familiar with the theme song. Stephanie DeCleene of TheGamer described the game as being "almost entirely lost to time" aside from being known as "that one game with the great theme song".
