= Particle Systems =

British video game developer

Argonaut Sheffield
- Company type: Division
- Industry: Video games
- Founded: 1993; 33 years ago
- Founder: Glyn Williams; Michael Powell
- Defunct: October 2004
- Fate: Dissolved together with its parent
- Headquarters: Sheffield, England
- Products: Independence War series
- Parent: Argonaut Games

Argonaut Sheffield (formerly Particle Systems Ltd.) was a British video game developer based in Sheffield, England. The company was founded as Particle Systems by Glyn Williams and Michael Powell. Games developed by Particle Systems include I-War and its sequel Independence War 2: Edge of Chaos. The company was working on tactical combat game EXO, when it was acquired by Argonaut Games in January 2002 and became Argonaut Sheffield. Under this new guise the company released Bionicle, Power Drome and submitted a number of demos for Star Wars, Charlie and the Chocolate Factory and Zorro. Argonaut Sheffield was closed in late October 2004 when Argonaut games was put into administration.

== Games developed ==
Year	Title	Publisher(s)
as Particle Systems
1993	Evasive Action	The Software Toolworks
1993	Subwar 2050	MicroProse
1997	I-War	Infogrames/Ocean
2001	Independence War 2: Edge of Chaos	Infogrames/Ocean
as Argonaut Sheffield
2003	Bionicle	Electronic Arts; Lego Interactive
2004	Power Drome	Mud Duck Productions, Evolved Games, Zoo Digital Publishing
