= Croc 2 (2001 video game) =

2001 video game

- Developer: Natsume Co., Ltd.
- Publisher: THQ
- Series: Croc
- Platform: Game Boy Color
- Release: January 26, 2001
- Genre: Platformer
- Mode: Single-player

Croc 2 is a 2001 platformer video game developed by Natsume Co., Ltd. and published by THQ for the Game Boy Color (GBC). It is part of the Croc series and the second game in the series for the GBC after Croc (2000). It is an adaptation of Croc 2 (1999) for the PlayStation and Windows. The game utilizes 2D sprite graphics, in contrast to the 3D polygon graphics featured in the 1999 game.

== Gameplay ==
The game is presented from an overhead perspective, instead of the side-view of the previous GBC game.

Croc 2 is a platformer with a faux-3D top-down perspective similar to The Legend of Zelda: Link's Awakening. The game begins with Croc receiving a message in a bottle from his mother, prompting him to embark on a quest to locate her. During his journey, he learns that Baron Dante and his minions, the Dantinis, are wreaking havoc across the land and capturing the Gobbos. The objective of the game is for Croc to assist the Gobbos, thwart the baron, and reunite with his mother. The player must navigate through four distinct villages—Sailor Village, Cossack Village, Caveman Village, and Inca Village—each comprising three levels and a boss battle. Each level has a Golden Gobbo to collect that is needed to complete the game perfectly. Enemies are defeated using Croc's tail attack. Gems can be collected to purchase various items, such as Jump Jellies and Robo Gobbos, which enable access to previously unreachable areas. The game also features puzzles that, for example, involve pushing boulders or guiding droplets of water through a pipe system. Unlike the first game for the GBC, the sequel doesn't have any minigames.

== Reception ==
Reception

Aggregate score
Aggregator	Score
GameRankings	74%

Review scores
Publication	Score
AllGame	3.5/5
Game Informer	6.5/10
GamesMaster	61%
GameSpot	6.0/10
GameZone	8.5/10
IGN	8.0/10
Jeuxvideo.com	15/20
MeriStation	7.6/10
Nintendo Power	6.9/10
The Electric Playground	6.5/10
Game Boy Mania	9/10
Gamereactor	8/10
Total Game Boy	95%

Croc 2 received reviews ranging from average to positive. Games Domain liked the audiovisual presentation and puzzle design. Overall, they called it a great game. AllGame criticized the visuals but called the gameplay solid and unique, and compared Croc 2 very favorably to the previous GBC game which was said to be "average at best". GamesMaster liked the graphics but the gameplay was said to be walking through mostly empty labyrinthine levels. GameSpot liked the puzzle design but felt they were reused too often. They also criticized the combat system for its poor collision detection. Overall, the game was noted as "painfully bland". IGN said that "As a sequel, Croc 2 blows away the original effort [on the GBC]". Gamereactor liked the graphics but called sound and music annoying, the gameplay was said to be monotonous. The combat was noted as frustrating due to the short range of the tail swipe. Jeuxvideo.com mentioned that the controls are somewhat impractical and take some getting used to since, for example, running requires pressing the directional button twice. MeriStation praised the music as catchy and its suitability to the events unfolding on the screen, although it was noted that the songs exhibited a lack of variety. The Electric Playground said the puzzles are too complex for the target age group. Game Informer wrote: "Croc 2's control is solid, but platforming from an isometric view is limiting, so the game boils down to a little exploration game with limited environments." Hardcore Gaming 101 said the game is too big because the scenery appears identical regardless of the location and there is no map. Music was noted as terrible and the combat was said to be hampered by inaccurate hit detection.

== 2026 re-release ==
Under a deal with Argonaut, the game was re-released physically by ModRetro in April 2026. This version of the game is similar to the ModRetro release of Croc, which includes quality-of-life improvements, a save feature and a revised control scheme.
