= Croc 2 =

1999 video game

- North American box art
- Developer: Argonaut Software
- Publishers: Fox Interactive; Argonaut Games (Remaster) (Note: PM Studios will publish the Nintendo Switch 2, Xbox One and Xbox Series X/S physical releases in North America, and Strictly Limited Games will publish the Switch 2 and PlayStation 5 versions in Europe.)
- Designer: Nic Cusworth
- Programmer: Anthony Lloyd
- Artist: Michael Hanrahan
- Composer: Karin Griffin
- Series: Croc
- Platforms: Original; PlayStation, Windows; Remaster; Nintendo Switch, PlayStation 4, PlayStation 5, Windows, Xbox Series X/S, Nintendo Switch 2
- Release: PlayStation: NA: 3 August 1999; EU: 20 August 1999; Windows: NA: 7 March 2000; EU: 9 June 2000; Remaster: WW: 29 October 2026; WW: 2027 (Switch 2)
- Genres: Platform, action-adventure
- Modes: Single-player, multiplayer

Croc 2 is a 1999 platform game developed by Argonaut Software and published by Fox Interactive. The sequel to Croc: Legend of the Gobbos, it revolves around the title character going on a quest to search for his missing parents, as well as saving the Inventor Gobbo from a revived Baron Dante.

Croc 2 was released for the Sony PlayStation in 1999, and for Windows in 2000. A 2D adaptation for the Game Boy Color was released in 2001. A port of the game for the Dreamcast was also planned but ultimately cancelled. The game's release was accompanied by a heavy advertising campaign, with Fox cross-promoting the game alongside Nabisco's "Gummi Savers" brand of candy. Croc 2 received mixed reviews, with critics particularly praising the game's graphics while criticizing its camera and difficulty. A remaster titled Croc 2: Kingdom of the Gobbos was released in October 2026 for PlayStation 4, PlayStation 5, Xbox Series X/S, Nintendo Switch and PC, with a Nintendo Switch 2 port to be released afterward.

== Gameplay ==
A screenshot from the game showing Croc's health in the top-left and the collectable gems in the top-right

Croc 2 features gameplay similar to its predecessor; the player controls Croc through various open-ended levels in order to complete various missions. The game's levels are split across four Gobbo "villages" and are accessed through an open hub world. The missions involve helping other Gobbos with a certain task such as rescuing another Gobbo who is trapped within a steel cage and chasing a Dantini through a stage in order to retrieve a stolen sandwich. After completing a certain number of levels in a village, a boss level is opened up, which allows access to the next village when completed. There are also levels requiring players to control vehicles such as a go-kart, a speedboat, a hang glider, a hot air balloon and a giant snowball among others.

Levels contain various collectible items, including 100 crystals and five multicolored crystals scattered throughout the stage. The colored gems are hidden in different places throughout the stage, and they require completing a platform challenge or completing a puzzle in order to be retrieved. Finding all five colored gems makes a golden trophy appear at the end of the level that is collected by traversing through a small platforming challenge. Collecting every trophy in a village allows access to an extra level that can be completed in order to collect a Jigsaw puzzle piece; collecting these pieces is required in order to access the game's fifth and final world, consisting of remixed level segments. Several items can be purchased at the hub worlds from Swap Meet Pete, an anthropomorphic cat, some of which are needed to access certain areas and secrets within the game. Among these items are heart pots, which lengthen Croc's maximum life count; Gummi Savers Jumps, which can be used as a trampoline in order to reach certain ledges; and the Clockwork Gobbo, a small wind-up robot that can be controlled to collect items by being used on a certain pedestal.

Croc is controlled using the D-pad or the analog stick, and he maneuvers levels by running, jumping, climbing and swimming; new to the game are the abilities to perform a triple jump and a flip jump, both of which allow Croc to reach higher altitudes than he can by jumping normally. Croc attacks enemies by swinging his tail in a full 360-degree motion, and he can also perform a ground pound in order to defeat enemies as well as destroy wooden crates containing items. Croc's health is represented by a set life count that can be extended by purchasing certain items; upon running out of "hearts", he is sent back to the hub world of the respective level he's in. Croc's life can be refilled by collecting large hearts located throughout stages as well by collecting a certain amount of crystals in a stage. Croc 2 features an additional control option titled "OmniPlay", which gives two people split control over Croc's movements and abilities for cooperative gameplay. Inputs for movement, attacking, jumping, sidestepping, camera, inventory as well as feedback through vibration can individually be toggled to be shared between two controllers or to be exclusively tied to the first player's controller.

== Plot ==
The game's plot is set several months after Croc: Legend of the Gobbos, and begins with Professor Gobbo being captured by the Dantinis while he was witnessing Baron Dante's resurrection.

Back at Gobbo Valley, Croc is playing on a beach and finds a message in a bottle. The message explains that the senders are looking for their child. Croc is surprised when he sees a crocodile's footprint on it, and takes the message to King Rufus, who reads it and tells Croc that he needs to look for other Gobbos far off, who may be able to help him in finding the crocodiles who sent the message. A large number of Gobbos make a see-saw. Croc stands on one end and a Gobbo pushes a boulder on to the other end to propel Croc to the distant Mainland, where his search begins.

Croc's reputation precedes him on the Mainland. Most of the Gobbo villagers speak with Croc as if they have previously established a rapport. There is little reference to the main point of Croc's quest until the player reaches the final village. Meanwhile, Baron Dante purposely sends his minions out to stop Croc in the form of boss battles.

Each Gobbo village has a different biome and cultural theme. Croc's goal is to defeat the various Dantinis that are plaguing each community, as well as the major minions the Baron sends to crush each village and prevent Croc from reaching his goal.

At the end of the Inca Village, Croc fights Baron Dante in a small airplane crafted by Professor Gobbo before rescuing the latter in the Dungeon of Defright. Eventually, Croc comes face-to-face with Baron Dante one last time, while protecting Professor Gobbo from the Baron's attacks so he can summon a portal to send him back to the dimension he had previously been banished to.

The main plot of the game ends with Croc and Professor Gobbo flying to a small island to meet Croc's long-lost family before pivoting to another part of the island where Croc's parents' eggs can be seen being stolen by Baron Dante. After collecting each Jigsaw Piece in every secret area of the villages with the aid of the Golden Gobbos collected throughout the levels, Croc ventures to Baron Dante's Secret World, which consists of the villages (except the Inca Village) that Croc had previously visited, inhabited by Dantinis instead of Gobbos. Croc must collect five Colored Crystals in each village to retrieve one egg. Three eggs must be retrieved to beat the game.

== Development ==
A Dreamcast port of the game was planned, having been mentioned in the UK print of the Dreamcast Monthly magazine and touted for release in Q3 of 2000. In a May 2000 interview, Argonaut Software managing director Jez San stated that the company was planning a Dreamcast version of Croc 2. He explained that the proposed version was not intended to be a straightforward port of the original game, with Argonaut instead considering the addition of new levels and worlds. However, San stressed that the project still required approval from publisher Fox Interactive. It was eventually cancelled in light of Argonaut's decision to stop developing Dreamcast games due to the declining commercial performance of the system.

== Promotion and release ==
Croc 2 was originally advertised in the instruction manual of the original game for a release on the PlayStation and Sega Saturn for a Christmas 1998 release; however, the game was later delayed to a summer 1999 release, and the Sega Saturn version of the game was ultimately never released. A Dreamcast port was also planned yet cancelled in mid-2000. A 2D platformer of the same name was also released in 2001 for Game Boy Color.

The game was heavily advertised during its release, with a multimillion-dollar advertisement campaign entailing television commercials, retail support, and customer incentives. A cross-promotional brand deal was held with Nabisco to promote the game alongside the company's Gummi Savers line of gummy candy. Alongside the candy being prominently featured as a usable item within the game, over 6.5 million candy wrappers were printed with Croc 2 logos on them. A promotional sweepstake competition, called the "Croc 2 Down Under" sweepstakes, was held during the game's release, with the contest's grand prize consisting of a family trip to Australia, as well as a copy of the game, a PlayStation console, and a copy of the game's strategy guide being featured as the other obtainable prizes.

== Remaster ==
During development of the 2025 remaster of Croc: Legend of the Gobbos, Argonaut Games stated in an X post on October 12, 2024 that they would be up to remastering Croc 2 if sales of the first game's remaster were successful. On July 29, 2026, a remaster of Croc 2 was officially revealed under the game's originally planned title, Croc 2: Kingdom of the Gobbos. Like with the previous remaster, the game features enhanced graphics and includes extras such as design materials and developer interviews. The game was released on October 29, 2026 for Nintendo Switch, PlayStation 4. PlayStation 5, Xbox Series S and Series X and PC. On October 20, 2026, Argonaut announced Nintendo Switch 2 editions of both Croc 2 and the first game's remaster would be released in 2027. The Switch 2, PlayStation 5, and Xbox Series versions will be released physically by PM Studios in North America while Strictly Limited Games will handle physical publication for the Switch 2 and PlayStation 5 versions in Europe. The original PC version of Croc 2, titled Croc 2 Classic, has also been released for modern PCs, bundled with the PC version of the remaster on GOG.com upon its release and scheduled for individual release alongside the first game's classic release on Steam.

== Reception ==
Reception

Aggregate score
Aggregator	Score	
Aggregator	PC	PS
GameRankings	67%	70%

Review scores
Publication	Score	
Publication	PC	PS
AllGame	2.5/5	2/5
CNET Gamecenter	7/10	8/10
Electronic Gaming Monthly	N/A	4.5/10, 5/10, 5.5/10, 5.5/10
Eurogamer	6/10	N/A
Famitsu	N/A	26/40
Game Informer	N/A	7.5/10
GameFan	N/A	65% (Note: In GameFan's early viewpoint of the PlayStation version, three critics gave it each a score of 61, 68, and 65.)
GameRevolution	N/A	D
GameSpot	5.8/10	5.4/10
IGN	6.5/10	7.5/10
Next Generation	N/A	4/5
Official U.S. PlayStation Magazine	N/A	2.5/5
PC Gamer (US)	65%	N/A
The Cincinnati Enquirer	N/A	1.5/4

Reception

Aggregate score
Aggregator	Score
OpenCritic	63% recommend (Note: Based on 16 reviews.)

Croc 2 received mixed or average reviews on all platforms according to the review aggregation website GameRankings. Many other reviewers gave the PlayStation version varied responses months before it was released Stateside.

IGN praised the voice acting, graphics, soundtrack and size of the PlayStation version, but criticised its difficulty and camera angles. GameSpot gave the PlayStation and PC versions poor ratings, also criticizing the camera angles and the difficulty. Matthew House of AllGame criticised the PlayStation version for its camera angles and difficulty, while also criticizing the game's graphics. Nash Werner of GamePro was also negative, saying of the PC version: "After weeks of playing Croc 2, I was praying each new level would be Croc 2's last, but it just kept dragging on and on." (Note: GamePro gave the PC version two 3/5 scores for graphics and overall fun factor, 2.5/5 for sound, and 4/5 for control.) However, Scary Larry called the PlayStation version "an acquired taste. While not as edgy and fast-paced as Crash Bandicoot: Warped or as well-oiled as Spyro, Croc 2 deserves a place on the same platform as your other platform games. With a little practice and patience, you'll find that Croc 2 provides plenty of ditzy diversion." (Note: In an early review of the PlayStation version, GamePro gave it 4.5/5 for graphics, two 3.5/5 scores for sound and control, and 4/5 for overall fun factor.) Next Generation called the same PlayStation version "one of the better 3D platformers [...] if just by a claw." In Japan, where the same console version was ported and published by Koei under the name Croc Adventure (クロックアドベンチャー, Kurokku Adobenchā) on 2 September 1999, Famitsu gave it a score of 26 out of 40.

Suzi Sez of GameZone gave the PC version 7.5 out of 10, calling it "a game you will want to play over and over again just to find things you missed when you last played." Alan Lackey of Computer Games Strategy Plus gave the PC version three-and-a-half stars out of five, saying: "With its cute storyline, Croc 2 is an entertaining but fairly unremarkable romp, especially suited for the younger gamer in the family."

The PlayStation version had sold around 500,000 copies by May 2000.
