= Alien Resurrection (video game) =

2000 video game

- North American box art
- Developer: Argonaut Games
- Publisher: Fox Interactive
- Producer: Ben Tuszynski
- Designer: Paul Crocker
- Programmer: Simon Hargrave
- Artist: Michael Wilson
- Platform: PlayStation
- Release: NA: 20 October 2000; EU: 1 December 2000
- Genres: First-person shooter, survival horror
- Mode: Single-player

Alien Resurrection is a 2000 first-person shooter game developed by Argonaut Games and published by Fox Interactive for the PlayStation. Based on the 1997 film of the same name, the game was originally intended to coincide with the film's release, but was mired in development hell for a few years, finally being completed and released in 2000.

== Plot ==
Following the same basic plot of the movie, the game takes place years after the events of Alien 3 and follows a cloned Lt. Ellen Ripley awaking aboard the USM Auriga and trying to escape from the xenomorph-infested research spaceship USM Auriga along with a crew of mercenaries.

When the Xenomorphs bred from the queen that was extracted from her cloned body escape containment and begin running rampant aboard the Auriga, Ripley must unite with a group of rag-tag mercenaries to escape the vessel.

== Gameplay ==
The game is a first person shooter (FPS) with survival horror elements. It consists of ten levels, the first nine taking place in the Xenomorph-infested USM Auriga, with the last aboard the mercenary ship Betty.

The player uses four different characters from the movie. Ripley is the main playable character for a majority of the game's levels, while Call, DiStephano, and Christie each get their own level as well. Each character has their own special equipment. Some players have different weapons. The selection includes a laser rifle, double barrel shotgun, grenade launcher, Shock rifle, flamer-thrower and a rocket launcher.

The player must complete different tasks to progress across the game. These include killing clones and ejecting overheating escape pods.

In addition to traditional drone aliens, the player also faces marines and facehuggers (if the player is implanted with an alien, they must track down a device to remove it, or the creature will hatch and the game ends), later fighting boss creatures such as the alien queen and the newborn.

== Development ==
Work on the game began in early 1996. Lacking any initial directive from Fox Interactive beyond that it be a game for the Alien franchise, Argonaut designed a game engine with an overhead shooter format inspired by the recent game Loaded. Pleased with the prototype, Fox Interactive green lit the project and further assigned the team to create a game which would appear in the film. Fox announced that Alien Resurrection would be released in late 1997 on the Sony PlayStation, Sega Saturn, and Microsoft Windows.

Fox weekly shipped the team boxes of scripts, storyboards, and raw footage from the film as reference material. After working on the game for a year, Argonaut Games decided that the Loaded genre had become outdated, and restarted development as a 3D action-adventure in the vein of Tomb Raider, which had been released after work on Alien Resurrection started. Frustrated at having a year's worth of work completely scrapped, a significant fraction of the development team quit the project. In November 1997, by which time the Sega Saturn version had been dropped, Fox announced a Spring 1998 release window for the title. After this release window was missed, the game was announced for a Fall 1998 release.

Morale dropped further when the team were invited to a private screening of the film; they found it underwhelming at best, and were disappointed that the game they had made for the film, Atom Zone, only appeared very briefly. The team struggled over technical difficulties with their 3D game engine for over a year, and in late 1998 decided to change the format a second time, to a first-person shooter. Having the game in first person removed the fundamental problems in the game's development; senior designer Christopher Smith recalled, "It was a moment where everything went, 'right'. If it remained in the other perspective it would've got cancelled. I'd have put money on that."

The game was one of the first games to use both analogue sticks of the DualShock controller for simultaneous movement and aiming. According to Ben Broth, a tester at Fox Interactive, the game's twin stick control scheme immediately went down well with the game's QA team. The game also supports the PlayStation Mouse.

The game was finally released exclusively for the Sony PlayStation in 2000 (20 October in the US and 1 December in Europe), almost three years after the film ran its course in theaters.

=== Security Bypass ===
In 2023, a developer on the game revealed a secret cheat code he implemented. The code allows the launching of unlicensed, burned discs.

== Reception ==
Reception

Aggregate score
Aggregator	Score
Metacritic	61/100

Review scores
Publication	Score
AllGame	2/5
CNET Gamecenter	6/10
Edge	8/10
Electronic Gaming Monthly	6.33/10 (Note: In Electronic Gaming Monthly's review of the game, one critic gave it 8/10, and the rest each gave it a score of 5.5/10.)
Eurogamer	4/10
Game Informer	6/10
GameFan	(MVS) 81% 79% (Note: In GameFan's viewpoint of the game, three critics gave it each a score of 85, 78, and 73.)
GameSpot	4.7/10
IGN	6.5/10
Next Generation	2/5
Official U.S. PlayStation Magazine	3/5
Maxim	6/10

The video game received "mixed or average" reviews, according to the review aggregation website Metacritic. Critics praised the game's atmosphere and frequently scary gameplay. However, criticism was directed at the graphics, as well as the harsh difficulty level. Jeff Lundrigan of NextGen said that the game had "Nice atmosphere, but what starts out frustrating quickly becomes kinda slow and dull."

Steven Garrett of GameSpot criticised the then-uncommon dual analogue stick control scheme, describing the game as "almost unplayably difficult to control and unreasonably hard to enjoy". Despite this, the control scheme would soon become standard for first-person shooters on consoles. GamePro said that the game was "a fine first-person shooter, but unless you're a big fan of the films, there are even better options (Medal of Honor, Quake II) out there." (Note: GamePro gave the game three 3.5/5 scores for graphics, sound, and fun factor, and 4.5/5 for control.)

The game sold 250,000 units. It was ultimately a financial failure for Argonaut Games due to its lengthy development period.

== See also ==
- List of Alien, Predator and Alien vs. Predator games
