= List of Might and Magic media =

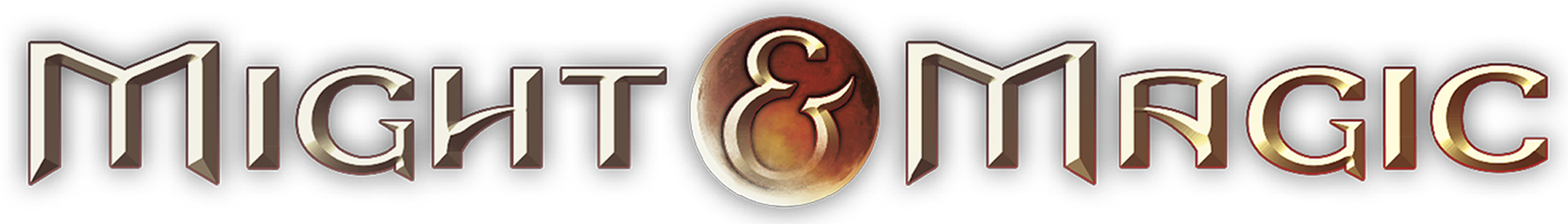
Logo of the Might and Magic series

This is a list of media related to the Might and Magic series of role-playing video games. Might and Magic was originally created by New World Computing, and was later produced by The 3DO Company and Ubisoft. This list contains all officially released, scheduled, and canceled Might and Magic media, as well as some released fan made add ons.

== Video games ==
=== Might and Magic ===
- Might and Magic Book One: The Secret of the Inner Sanctum (1986)
- Might and Magic II: Gates to Another World (1988)
- Might and Magic III: Isles of Terra (1991)
- Might and Magic IV: Clouds of Xeen (Note: Might and Magic IV and V can be combined to produce a single game called World of Xeen. This combination unlocks additional content not available in any of the games alone. World of Xeen has also been released as a bundle in 1994.) (1992)
- Might and Magic V: Darkside of Xeen (1993)
- Might and Magic VI: The Mandate of Heaven (1998)
- Might and Magic VII: For Blood and Honor (1999)
- Might and Magic VIII: Day of the Destroyer (2000)
- Might and Magic IX (2002)
- Might & Magic X: Legacy (2014)

==== Anthologies ====
- Might and Magic Trilogy (1993), includes Might and Magic games III, IV, V, and the fanmade Swords of Xeen.
- Might and Magic I, II, III, IV, V: Collection Classique (1998), contains the games I-V.
- Ultimate Might and Magic Archives (1998), includes the first five Might and Magic games, World of Xeen and the fanmade Swords of Xeen.
- Might and Magic VI: The Mandate of Heaven – Limited Edition (1998), a collector's edition of Might and Magic VI that included the first five games on CD-ROM as well.
- Might and Magic VI: The Mandate of Heaven – Special Edition (1998), included Might and Magic games I, II, III, IV, V and the fanmade Swords of Xeen as well.
- Might and Magic Sixpack (1998), includes the first six Might and Magic games.
- Might and Magic: Millennium Edition (1999), includes the Might and Magic games IV, V, VI and VII.
- Might and Magic: Platinum Edition (2002), includes the Might and Magic games VI, VII, VIII and IX.

=== Heroes of Might and Magic ===
- Heroes of Might and Magic: A Strategic Quest (1995)
- Heroes of Might and Magic II: The Succession Wars (1996)

- The Price of Loyalty (1997)

- Heroes of Might and Magic III: The Restoration of Erathia (1999)

- Armageddon's Blade (1999)
- The Shadow of Death (2000)
- Heroes Chronicles

- Warlords of the Wasteland (2000)
- Conquest of the Underworld (2000)
- Clash of the Dragons (2000)
- Masters of the Elements (2000)
- The World Tree (2000)
- The Fiery Moon (2000)
- Revolt of the Beastmasters (Note: Revolt of the Beastmasters and The Sword of Frost have been released as a bundle named The Final Chapters.) (2001)
- The Sword of Frost (2001)

- Remake (2027)

- Heroes of Might and Magic IV (2002)

- The Gathering Storm (2002)
- Winds of War (2003)

- Heroes of Might and Magic V (2006)

- Hammers of Fate (2006)
- Tribes of the East (2007)

- Might & Magic Heroes VI (2011)

- Pirates of the Savage Sea (2012)
- Danse Macabre (2012)
- Shades of Darkness (2013)

- Might & Magic Heroes VII (2015)
- Heroes of Might and Magic: Olden Era (2025)

=== Spin-offs ===
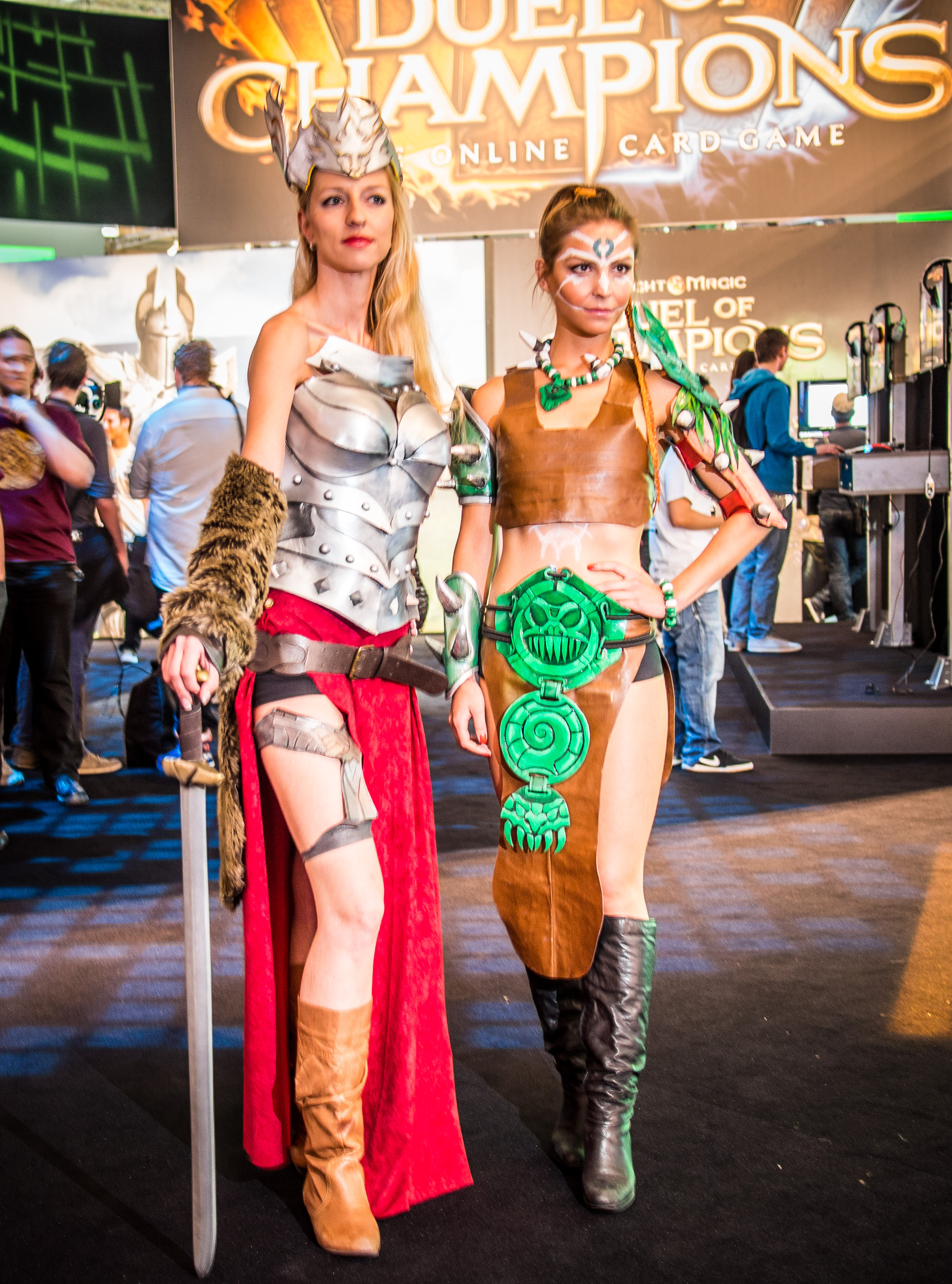
Duel of Champions promotion at Gamescom 2013

- Swords of Xeen (1993)
- Might and Magic Online (MMORPG; canceled ca. 1997-98)
- Arcomage (1999)
- Crusaders of Might and Magic (1999)
- Heroes of Might and Magic for the Game Boy Color (2000)
- Heroes of Might and Magic II for the Game Boy Color (2000)
- Warriors of Might and Magic (2000)
- Heroes of Might and Magic: Quest for the Dragon Bone Staff (2001)
- Legends of Might and Magic (2001)
- Shifters (2002)
- Might and Magic Mobile (2004)
- Heroes of Might and Magic Mini (2006, browser game – discontinued, promotional)
- Dark Messiah of Might and Magic (2006)
- Might and Magic Mobile II (2007)
- Heroes of Might and Magic Online (2008)
- Might and Magic: Heroes Kingdoms (2009)
- Might & Magic: Clash of Heroes (2009)
- Might and Magic: Heroes Battles (2011, Facebook app – discontinued, promotional)
- Might and Magic: Duel of Champions (2012, an online card game, discontinued)
- Might and Magic Raiders (cancelled)
- Might & Magic Heroes Online (2014)
- Might & Magic: Elemental Guardians (2018)
- Might & Magic Heroes: Era of Chaos (2019)
- Might & Magic: Chess Royale (2020)
- Might & Magic: Dynasty (2020, discontinued)
- Might & Magic: Armies (2022)
- Heroes of Might & Magic: Wars of the Lords (2024)
- Might & Magic Fates (2025)

=== Remakes and remasters ===
- Heroes of Might and Magic III: HD Edition (2015)
- Might & Magic: Clash of Heroes – Definitive Edition (2023)
- Heroes of Might and Magic III Remake (2027)

== Tabletop games ==
- Heroes of Might and Magic IV (card game) (2005)

- Storm Winds (2006)

- Heroes of Might and Magic V (collectible card game) (2006)
- Might & Magic Heroes (board game) (2012)
- Heroes of Might & Magic III: The Board Game (2023)
- Heroes of Might and Magic (role-playing game) (2026)
- Heroes of Might and Magic: Battles (2026)
- Heroes of Might and Magic: The Card Game (2026)

== Novels ==
- Might and Magic Book One: The Dreamwright (Geary Gravel, 1995)
- Might and Magic Book Two: The Shadowsmith (Geary Gravel, 1996)
- Might and Magic Book Three: The Worldcrafters (Geary Gravel, cancelled)
- Might and Magic: The Sea of Mist (Mel Odom, 2001)

== See also ==
- King's Bounty, a forerunner to the Heroes of Might and Magic series
- Dragon Rage, originally developed as a Might and Magic game
