= Might and Magic IX =

2002 video game

- Developer: New World Computing
- Publisher: The 3DO Company
- Director: Keith Francart
- Producer: James W. Dickinson
- Designer: Timothy Lang
- Programmer: L. Dean Gibson II
- Artist: Kate Vanover
- Composers: Paul Romero; Rob King; Barry Blum; Steve Baca
- Series: Might and Magic
- Engine: Lithtech
- Platform: Windows
- Release: NA: March 28, 2002
- Genre: Role-playing
- Mode: Single player

Might and Magic IX is a role-playing video game, the last developed by New World Computing for Microsoft Windows and released in 2002 by The 3DO Company. It is the sequel to Might and Magic VIII: Day of the Destroyer. It is the first to feature a significant game engine overhaul since 1998's Might and Magic VI: The Mandate of Heaven. Powered by the Lithtech engine, it was also the first game in the series to feature fully three-dimensional graphics. During production, it was known by the working title of Might and Magic IX: Writ of Fate, and it is usually referred to by that title by fans of the series.

The music soundtrack is by Paul Anthony Romero, Rob King and Steve Baca.

== Gameplay ==
Might and Magic IX features a party of four player characters, each of whom is selected at the start of the game. Each character has six statistical attributes: might, magic, endurance, accuracy, speed, and luck, and the number of points assigned to each attribute is based upon the race of the character: three of the four available races have both a strong attribute, which reduces the cost of advancement in that area by half, and a weak attribute, which doubles the cost of advancement in that area. Dwarves are proficient in endurance, but lacking in magic; elves are proficient in accuracy, but lacking in endurance; half-orcs are proficient in strength, but lacking in speed. The final race, human, has no natural affinity for any particular attribute, but similarly suffers from no penalties in any category. In addition to the six primary statistics, there are a number of secondary statistics which cannot be adjusted manually by the player, but are instead calculated based on other factors. Examples include armor class, which is determined by combining a character's endurance with the protectiveness of whatever armor he or she may be wearing, and hit points, which are directly related to a character's endurance rating.

=== Promotion system ===
Base class	1st promotion	2nd promotion
Fighter	Mercenary	Gladiator
Fighter	Mercenary	Assassin
Fighter	Crusader	Ranger
Fighter	Crusader	Paladin
Initiate	Scholar	Mage
Initiate	Scholar	Lich
Initiate	Healer	Priest
Initiate	Healer	Druid

Additionally, each character is assigned a particular character class. At the start of the game, there are two classes available: the fighter (might-based) and the initiate (magic-based). At various points throughout the game, the player will have the opportunity to complete certain tasks to gain a job promotion. Each character can be promoted up to two times, and there are two possible promotion paths for each class at each level. For example, a fighter can be promoted into either the mercenary class or the crusader class. A crusader can then be promoted into either the ranger class or the paladin class. Consult the chart at left for a complete listing of all possible promotion paths and classes.

=== Skill system ===
A typical gameplay screen.

There are a total of twenty three unique skills available in the game, divided among four distinct categories. There are six attack skills, such as blade or unarmed combat, that determine what types of weapon a character can use, and how effective that character is when using them. The three defensive skills, armor, dodging, and shield, determine what forms of armor a character can use, as well as his or her ability to parry enemy attacks. The four magic abilities correspond the four schools of magic available in the game (dark, elemental, light, and spirit) and determine a character's ability to cast particularly magic spells in each school. The final category covers miscellaneous skills, such as the ability to disarm traps, or to repair items that have been broken. Each skill comes in four levels of proficiency: normal, expert, master, and grand master, and the class of a character affects the skills that he or she is capable of learning. For instance, the Gladiator class can only attain the expert level of the thrown weapons skill, while the assassin can reach the grand master level.

== Plot ==
=== Storyline ===
The game's main questline takes place on the world of Axeoth a short time following the destruction of the world of Enroth - the location of Might and Magic VI through Might and Magic VIII - as depicted in Heroes of Might and Magic IV, and deals with the attempted invasion of the region of Chedian by the army of the Beldonian warlord Tamur Leng. The player controls a party of raiders from the town of Ravensford, who are shipwrecked on the Isle of Ashes and told of their fate by a hermit, Yrsa the Troll. Joined by another shipwrecked warrior named Forad Darre, they travel to the six clans of Chedian, uniting them against the threat of the Beldonian Horde.

Forad Darre is sent to lead the armies of Chedian against the Beldonian Horde while the party performs a task for Yrsa, but they are slaughtered to the man. The spirit of one of the six slain Jarls, Sven Forkbeard, reveals that Darre is a double-agent working for Leng, and the party is sent to the Otherworld of Axeoth to recover the dead warriors from Skraelos, the god of death. Before doing so, they are sent to the ethereal Dark Passage by the gatekeeper of Hallenhalt, Hanndl, to obtain a Writ of Fate from the Wyrde Igrid. Returning to Chedian, they find the Beldonian armies occupying the city of Frosgard, and slay Forad Darre. Confronting Tamur Leng, the party learns that Leng possesses a second Writ of Fate, which contradicts the party's destiny.

Returning to Hallenhalt with Tamur Leng, the party speaks with Krohn and Fre, the leaders of the gods, who reveal that the god of chaos - Njam the Meddler - has been orchestrating their destiny from the start. Disposing of the Wyrdes, influencing Leng to send Forad Darre, and taking the forms of Yrsa the Troll and Igrid, the god of chaos plotted an elaborate coup against Krohn, coveting Fre and desiring rulership of the denizens of Axeoth for himself. Krohn sends the party to imprison a pursuing Njam in the Tomb of a Thousand Terrors, and they succeed, encasing the malevolent god in a shell of impenetrable frost. The gods present them their true Writ of Fate, stating that their true destiny all along was to imprison Njam in the Tomb.

=== Setting ===
The game takes place on the fictional world of Axeoth, in the Chedian region of the continent of Rysh. The previous three games in the main Might and Magic series had taken place on the world of Enroth, the setting introduced by the spinoff series Heroes of Might and Magic. The change to a new world with little direct connection to previous storylines was prompted by the destruction of Enroth, as depicted in the introductory sequence of Heroes of Might and Magic IV, which also takes place on Axeoth. Unlike Heroes IV, however, Might and Magic IX makes only passing reference to the series' previous setting, as it takes place on a different continent than the one most survivors of Enroth ended up on. Only one character from previous games in the series, Prince Nicolai Ironfist, makes a return appearance, though King Roland Ironfist and the Kreegan are also mentioned.

A map of the land of Chedian.

The land of Chedian lies upon the east coast of Rysh, and is divided into several towns and cities ruled by six disagreeable clans, with the nations of Framon and Beldonia further to the west. Time in Rysh is calculated according to years following the Great Cataclysm, an event in which the enigmatic sorcerer, Verhoffin, unleashed a destructive spell of such power upon the continent that its entire geography was reshuffled, crippling the Ursanian Empire from which the Beldonians are descended. Each clan is ruled by a Jarl, and uniting the clans under one banner is a major objective of the game. Many themes, characters and location names, such as the gods, the Frost Giants, Lindisfarne, Arslegard and the Otherworld, were directly inspired by Celtic and Norse mythology. The continent upon which Heroes IV takes place, which was settled by refugees from Enroth, is located far across the sea, and is not referenced in-game. In a break from tradition, very few elements of the series' science fantasy theme are prevalent in the game itself, though they are present in the backstory.

== Development ==
Development on Might and Magic IX began in 2001, following the release of Might and Magic VIII: Day of the Destroyer. It was the first game in the series to be designed by Tim Lang, and the first in which Jon Van Caneghem, the series creator, was not involved in game design. As the first title in the series in which New World Computing received a deadline for completion from 3DO, Might and Magic IX's developers were faced with a lack of time and resources during production. This, coupled with limited employees due to staff cuts and ongoing work on Legends of Might and Magic, forced the game's developers to cut corners and eliminate features originally planned to be retained from previous games. Tim Lang has since commented that the game was "pre-alpha at best", and would have required another six months of development to be satisfyingly playable.

Information on Might and Magic IX's was first published on the Norwegian website Gibme.com, and its development was later confirmed at GameSpot by a 3DO representative. Jon Van Caneghem, the series creator, had minimal involvement in the development of Might and Magic IX. In 2004, he stated in an interview that if it were his decision, the game would not have been shipped in its present state.

During the production of Might and Magic IX, Tim Lang began designing a preliminary storyline for a possible Might and Magic X. Potential story elements of a sequel had already been hinted at in the game itself. The game was planned to take place in Beldonia, and Nicolai Ironfist and the Jarls were to return as major characters.

== Reception ==
Reception

Aggregate score
Aggregator	Score
Metacritic	55/100

Review scores
Publication	Score
AllGame	2.5/5 stars
Computer Gaming World	1.5/5 stars
GameSpot	6.2/10
GameSpy	60%
GameZone	6.5/10
IGN	6.7/10
Jeuxvideo.com	13/20
PC Gamer (US)	51%
RPGFan	72%
X-Play	2/5 stars

The game received "mixed" reviews according to the review aggregation website Metacritic.

Several critics expressed disappointment over the title, which was amplified and highly publicized considering the series' previously acclaimed success. The game was widely lambasted by critics, citing lack of environment interactivity, uninspiring graphics, and a general lack of polish. AllGame stated that the game "suffers from rushed production (the "save game" screen is primarily made up of huge blocky text and boxes) and a flawed engine. It's a considerable departure from the previous games in the series, which were released virtually bug-free and widely regarded as full of 'heart and soul.'"

As a result of its hasty development, a number of potentially serious software bugs were uncovered shortly after the game's release. 3DO ultimately released a single patch (version 1.2) for the game that addressed some, but not all, of these problems. Shortly after the release of the patch, 3DO declared bankruptcy and was dissolved, eliminating the possibility that remaining problems would ever receive an official fix.

=== Awards ===
The game was a runner-up for the "Most Disappointing Game on PC" award at GameSpot's Best and Worst of 2002 Awards, which went to Civilization III: Play the World.
