= Might & Magic Heroes VI =

2011 video game

- Developers: Black Hole Entertainment; Limbic Entertainment; Virtuos
- Publisher: Ubisoft
- Director: Gábor Illés
- Designer: Gábor Szabó
- Programmer: Sándor Jakus
- Artist: Tamás Sándor
- Writer: Jeffrey Spock
- Composers: Rob King; Paul Romero; Jason Graves; Tom Salta
- Series: Heroes of Might and Magic
- Platform: Windows
- Release: October 13, 2011
- Genre: Turn-based strategy
- Modes: Single-player, multiplayer

Might & Magic Heroes VI, also known as Might & Magic: Heroes VI, is a turn-based strategy video game for Microsoft Windows developed by Black Hole Entertainment and published by Ubisoft. Some patches and downloadable content were developed by Limbic Entertainment, while the standalone expansion Shades of Darkness was developed by Virtuos. It is the sixth installment in the Heroes of Might and Magic series, and was released on October 13, 2011, coinciding with the 25th anniversary of the Might and Magic franchise. Heroes VI acts as a prequel to Heroes of Might and Magic V, occurring almost five centuries earlier, and is set in the fictional world of Ashan. The story follows the five heirs to the Griffin dynasty in their quests to repel a demon invasion and assist or impede Michael, a legendary Archangel general plotting to revive an ancient war.

As in previous Heroes of Might and Magic titles, the player can choose between single-player or multiplayer modes of play, and controls a number of heroes and towns associated with various factions, commanding armies of creatures between tactical overland exploration and a turn-based combat system to satisfy each scenario's victory conditions. Heroes VI alters some of the series' long-standing conventions, overhauling its chance-based skills system as well as removing the old "magic guild" spell system and replacing both with a hero-based "talents" tree. The game also reduced the number of resources from seven to four in its economics model, and introduced new mechanics, including a points-based reputation system, army-less hero travel, and increased area control by faction-affiliated towns.

Heroes VI received "generally favorable reviews". Reviewers praised the title's replay value, visuals and improvements to the Heroes formula, but were critical of the numerous bugs and glitches in the release version and its intrusive DRM system, which requires players to maintain a connection to the Internet to avail several features.

== Gameplay ==
The gameplay of Heroes VI mainly follows in the same vein taken by its predecessor, i.e. hero-based faction-affiliated development. As such, every faction has two types of heroes, every unit has an upgrade and turns affect combat as they affect the general gameplay. There are substantial changes, however, and these include the replacement of magic guilds by the creation of the spells/abilities wheel, in addition to the skills wheel. New affiliations called "Tears" or "Blood" appear and play a major role in hero development, notably influencing their skills. For instance, a "Tears" affiliated hero will have more defensive/beneficial buffs and his or her reputation will allow for more peaceful negotiations between potential enemies. A "Blood" affiliated hero, on the other hand, will profit from destructive/dark abilities and gain bonuses in adversary combat aimed to hurt the opponents.

The player's possessions are still regrouped in "Kingdoms", though now they are not just an overview, but also a part of the map "owned" by that player. The presence of a town determines who owns the land itself. All forts, mines/deposits and occasional goods givers now automatically replenish the army and the wealth of this player even if another player's heroes "flag" them. This situation lasts as long as the player is the owner of this given town. Only a few buildings within the area still remain neutral to whoever visits them. The feature was reported as a big improvement of the gameplay since the previous games, as players no longer need to garrison their mines and dwellings located outside towns for protection, even though it was also criticized as being "too easy" by some older fans.

Finally, the game now features only four collectable resources (instead of the classic seven): gold, wood, ore, and blood crystals. The wood and ore are more common and serve to build the player's towns as well as keep the flow of the marketplace. The gold is less common and serves to purchase goods and armies. The crystals are rare and valuable, and are required for otherwise unaffordable content (like Champion creatures, for example). There is also a new mode called "kingdom conquest" in multiplayer, in which the players must capture as many towns as possible, and maintain their hold of their "kingdoms" for a certain period of time. It is similar to the "king of the hill" feature in many first-person shooter games.

=== Factions ===
There are five factions in the game: Haven, Sanctuary, Stronghold, Inferno and Necropolis. In general the first two factions are "good-aligned", Stronghold is neutral and the last two are considered "evil". However, within the story-arc individual representatives of each can have their own behaviours that do not necessarily align with their faction's alignment.

Each faction has its own individual campaign. In addition, there is a short introductory campaign that is mandatory for all the factions—it teaches the game mechanics, is played as Haven and features two final alignment specific missions playable by every faction after completing their campaign, one featuring an attack on the angels' floating cities if a faction hero chose the 'tears' or good alignment and the other a hunt to exterminate the Faceless if a hero chooses the 'blood' or evil alignment.

Shades of Darkness adds a new faction, Dungeon, similar to much of its previous installment appearances. The Dungeon faction is considered neutrally-aligned, much like Stronghold, however unlike Stronghold, the Dungeon's campaign does revolve around the other factions (most notably Haven and Inferno) and its final alignment is rather chosen by the players themselves over the course of the game.

== Synopsis ==
=== Setting ===
Heroes VI takes place on the continent of Thallan in the fictional world of Ashan, a setting developed by Ubisoft between 2004 and 2008 for use in all of its Might and Magic-related projects, starting with Heroes of Might and Magic V in 2006. Ashan is populated by approximately eleven factions inspired by those appearing in previous Heroes games and real-life cultures, five of which are showcased in Heroes VI. Many of those factions have deified dragons, with their worship system centralized around one or more dragon gods linked to the classical elements (however, some factions like Orcs and the Spider Cult of Necromancers, do not worship dragons, while the Wizards of the Seven Cities are alluded to be atheist and rather regard the dragons as some magical creation); the conflict between the followers of Elrath, the Dragon of Light, and Malassa, the Dragon of Darkness, provides the background for the events of the game. Demon invaders periodically invade and terrorize Ashan during eclipses, which weaken the magical barrier trapping them in Sheogh, an otherworldly prison. Heroes VI also re-introduces passing references to the Ancients, a super advanced society of beings which narratively connected previous worlds featured in the Might and Magic franchise.

=== Plot ===
In the everlasting war between the Orcs and the Griffin Empire, led by duke Pavel Griffin, Toghrul, an Orc shaman, summons the demons in order to help him and his tribe get rid of Pavel. The demons then overpower Pavel and slay him, but his sister, Sveltana (a necromancer) is able to trap Pavel's soul in the Griffin familial sword with which he has fought. However, before she can intervene, an Angel descends and steals the sword.

Counseled by Angels in the impending war against the demons, Emperor Liam Falcon posts a decree enabling Duke Gerhart of the Wolf duchy to exterminate Orcs in the Empire. Duke Slava, Pavel's son, retaliates in solidarity with the Orcs, and the Dukes' bickering forces cause the Archangel Uriel - Michael's brother - to intervene. Uriel decides that Slava's eldest daughter, Irina, is to be betrothed to Gerhart to force a lasting peace. A decade passes, and Sandor, Slava's bastard son, learns that Irina has been imprisoned in the Wolf Duchy's jails for injuring Gerhart. He rouses an army of Orcs to free her, and the renegades flee to the Jade Ocean, where Sandor leaves Irina in Hashima and departs. Irina quickly befriends the native Naga and assists them in destroying a Wolf trading port, before discovering she is pregnant with Gerhart's child.

Gerhart accuses Slava of orchestrating Sandor's attack, and the two dukes are called before the Emperor, where Slava's youngest daughter Anastasya - Uriel's pupil and lover - kills Slava with a concealed knife before the court. Slava's eldest son, Anton is crowned Duke, but the inquisition tries to force a confession from Anastasya, fearing she is in league with the Faceless; Anton elects to euthanize his sister before she can be tortured. He learns that Jorgen - one of Slava's former advisers - is an undercover Faceless, but not Slava's killer, while Anastasya is resurrected by Sveltana as an undead. Resolving to learn who manipulated her into slaying her father, she frees Jorgen from the inquisition before travelling onward to Heresh with her aunt. Meanwhile, her twin brother Kiril finds himself abandoned in Sheogh by his mentor, the Archangel Sarah, with the soul of a demon prince sharing his body. Desperate to expunge the demon, he pursues Sarah as a renewed demon invasion begins.

Sveltana is kidnapped by Anastasya's rival, Miranda. Suspecting her of Slava's murder, Anastasya kills Miranda, and she explains that Anastasya was controlled with a comb empowered by Faceless magic. Irina ransacks the Wolf duchy, slaughtering Gerhart, and both she and Sandor devote their resources to the eradication of the demons. Michael dispatches Anton to assist Gerhart against the Naga, but Anton soon learns the Duke has already been killed. Using the comb, Anastasya enters the mind of her betrayer: Uriel, who had sought to use her soul to reincarnate his mother. Enraged, Anastasya destroys Uriel's mind, and both he and Emperor Liam are slain in battle, leaving Anton to eliminate the remaining demons. Kiril finally apprehends Sarah, who reveals she sold Kiril's soul to the demons in order to cripple the Faceless by destroying their repository of knowledge; Kiril usurps the repository and frees himself of possession, while Sveltana discovers that Pavel's soul was used to resurrect Michael.

With the demons overcome, Michael appeals to the Griffin heirs to assist him in ending his war against darkness. If the alignment of the player's chosen heir is Tears, the heir rejects Michael's calls to arms and leads armies against the Angels, alongside Cate. Michael is killed in battle and Cate succeeds in sending the remaining deceased Angels' souls to Elrath, but the ritual ultimately results in her death. Alternatively, if the heir's alignment is Blood, they launch an offensive against Cate, sponsored by Michael, and succeed in slaying her to apparently prevent the impending conflict.

In both instances, the Griffins lament Cate's death and bury her with Slava, while Jorgen conspires with the Dark Elf Raelag to instigate the war against Elrath in the wake of her absence.

== Development ==
Heroes VI was hinted at as early as June 2009, in video developer diaries for Might & Magic: Clash of Heroes: Le Breton and fellow producer Romain de Waubert wore shirts sporting a Might and Magic: Heroes VI logo. In an interview with PlanetDS.de, the producers dropped further hints relating to the project's existence, with de Waubert stating "I'm such a fan of Might & Magic that I wear its future like a second skin, very close to my heart."

According to Le Breton, Nival Interactive were considered to reprise their role as series developer, but Ubisoft could not agree on a common vision with the Heroes V team, most of whom had already been transferred to work on Allods Online; Black Hole Entertainment impressed Ubisoft as experienced, talented and passionate people, and were selected to create the sequel. Olivier Ledroit had again collaborated with Ubisoft on the game's art direction, and community suggestions had been heavily incorporated via a private forum.

Though expected to be first unveiled at Gamescom 2010, numerous screenshots and the teaser trailer prepared for the announcement were leaked and posted early at the fansite Heroes Community, several days prior to the official press release.

On May 24, 2011, it was announced that the alpha version of the game was complete and that the first public beta testing would start in June. On June 6, the date was confirmed as 28 June. The beta ran public for 6 or 7 weeks, after which the title went gold with a release date set for September 30, 2011. However, the date was changed to October 13 weeks prior in order to coincide with the 25th anniversary of the Might & Magic franchise. Multiple posters showing famous creatures' change from their first game up to this day and other promotional content were released as teasers.

On April 17, 2012, Ubisoft announced that Black Hole Entertainment was no longer working on Might & Magic Heroes VI; instead, Limbic Entertainment would be, who had previously helped Black Hole Entertainment with some of the final stages of development. Patches 1.3 onward were developed by Limbic Entertainment. At this time, Black Hole Entertainment had filed for bankruptcy as a result of the nature of this development, and members of the company blamed Ubisoft for the mistakes; Ubisoft reassumed all rights to the game following a copyright lawsuit.

On July 12, 2012, Ubisoft released a freemium downloadable add-on package for the game: Pirates of the Savage Sea. It corresponded to another patch release, which featured a lot of bug fixes and several new features, such as town screens (due to high fan demand). On September 27, 2012, another similar package was released in the same way, Danse Macabre. Both packages were developed by Limbic Entertainment.

In all, 27 patches were released for Heroes VI, 23 of them for the original and four for the expansion.

In October 2023, Ubisoft announced the servers for several of its games, including Might & Magic Heroes VI, would be shut down on January 24, 2024, affecting the game's multiplayer capability and other online features.

== Soundtrack ==
Rob King and Paul Romero, who were responsible for the sound design and music composition on all previous entries in the Heroes series and four of their sister role-playing video games, returned to work on the game alongside new composers Jason Graves and Rick Knight. The soundtrack consists of several new compositions and a "medley of iconic themes" from previous Might and Magic games, including Heroes of Might and Magic II, III and V, Dark Messiah of Might and Magic, Might & Magic: Clash of Heroes and Might and Magic VI: The Mandate of Heaven. The music of the Heroes series was featured at 2010's Video Games Live concert series in order to help promote the game, and Romero performed a smaller concert exclusive to Hungarian fans of the series in November 2011, shortly after Heroes VI's release.

== Shades of Darkness ==
The stand-alone expansion, named Might & Magic Heroes VI: Shades of Darkness, was released in May 2013. Unlike the original game and its DLC, Shades of Darkness was developed by Virtuos. Its main protagonist is the Dark Elf Raelag, who first appeared in Heroes of Might and Magic V, and features the return of the Dungeon faction, led by the Dark Elves. New additional content is also available, such as about 20 new neutral creatures, 10 new buildings and three new artifact sets. There are also notable changes to the multiplayer wing, especially the way players connect to the Conflux and a redesigned Legacy weapons system. The expansion includes a new town and seven new creatures such as Assassins, dragons, facelesses, shadow watchers and minotaurs.

It was initially scheduled to be released on February 28, 2013, but on February 7 it was announced that the release date of the expansion and the "Complete Edition" would be postponed to May 2, 2013, due to technicalities.

== Reception ==
=== Might & Magic Heroes VI ===
Might & Magic Heroes VI

Aggregate score
Aggregator	Score
Metacritic	77/100

Review scores
Publication	Score
Game Informer	8.25/10
GamePro	3/5
GameSpot	8/10
GameSpy	3/5
GamesRadar+	4/5
GameStar	85%
GameTrailers	7.8/10
IGN	8/10
PC Gamer (UK)	83%
RPGFan	61%
The A.V. Club	B+
Metro	6/10

Initially, the game was plagued with numerous in-game crashes, lock-ups, errors, and bugs; poor artificial intelligence; significant faction/hero/creature imbalance; and the usage of DRM. The game has been updated with several patches, bringing the version to 2.1.1. On September 25, 2013, Ubisoft declared that there would be no more online support on Heroes VI, bringing an official end to the updates.

The game received positive to mixed reviews according to the review aggregation website It is listed as an IGN Editors' Choice, citing "addictive turn-based strategy" gameplay and "major improvements to a fantastic formula". GameSpy and GamePro noted similar positives but lowered their scores due to "little visual bugs and glitches" and a poor online strategy.

=== Shades of Darkness ===
Might & Magic Heroes VI: Shades of Darkness

Aggregate score
Aggregator	Score
Metacritic	66/100

Review scores
Publication	Score
Destructoid	4/10
Game Informer	7/10
GameSpot	6/10
GameStar	81%

The Shades of Darkness expansion pack received "average" reviews according to Metacritic.
