= Might and Magic VIII: Day of the Destroyer =

2000 video game

- Cover art by Larry Elmore
- Developer: New World Computing
- Publishers: WW: The 3DO Company (PC); JP: Imagineer (PS2)
- Director: Paul Rattner
- Producer: Peter Ryu
- Designers: Jon Van Caneghem; Bryan Farina; James W. Dickinson; Tom Ono; Richard Corredera
- Programmer: Bob Young
- Artist: John Slowsky
- Composers: Rob King; Paul Romero; Steve Baca
- Series: Might and Magic
- Platforms: Windows, PlayStation 2
- Release: Windows: NA: March 2, 2000; UK: June 30, 2000; PlayStation 2: JP: September 6, 2001
- Genre: Role-playing
- Mode: Single player

Might and Magic VIII: Day of the Destroyer is a role-playing video game in the science fantasy genre developed for Microsoft Windows by New World Computing and released in 2000 by The 3DO Company. It is the eighth game in the Might and Magic series. The game received middling critical reviews, a first for the typically high-rated series, with several critics citing the game's length and its increasingly dated game engine, which had been left fundamentally unaltered since Might and Magic VI: The Mandate of Heaven in 1998. The game was later ported to PlayStation 2 in Japan and published by Imagineer on September 6, 2001.

== Gameplay ==
Might and Magic VIII is based on the Might and Magic VI game engine, and many of its elements are strongly similar to the previous two titles in the series. Unlike the previous two games, however, Might and Magic VIII introduces a new party management system that allows all but one of the player characters to be hired, dismissed or re-hired at any time during gameplay to vary the composition of the party. The character class system used in the previous two games has similarly been overhauled, with only the Cleric and Knight classes remaining and the Sorcerer class re-tooled as Necromancers. The experience, spells, levelling and skill system present in both previous Might and Magic titles is retained, with only minor updates.

In place of the traditional class system, Might and Magic VIII features non-archetypical playable races. Aside from human Knights, Clerics and Necromancers, the available classes are Minotaurs, Vampires, Dark Elves, Trolls and Dragons, each of whom possesses traits unique to their particular race. The player's party has a maximum size of five characters. The character created by the player at the start of the game remains with the party for the entire game and is referred to as the "Acknowledged Champion of Jadame". The other four slots in the party are filled by recruiting pre-made adventurers encountered during gameplay. Not all slots necessarily need to be filled, although some quests can only be completed with a specific adventurer in the party. Dragons are the only class who cannot be created at startup and must be recruited as pre-made characters, due to being inherently more powerful than other classes.

As with its two predecessors, the game world is divided into fourteen "regions", including five elemental planes, each of which contains a varying mix of explorable towns, dungeons and wildernesses. Enemies are fought in either real-time or turn-based combat, depending on the player's preference.

As in Might and Magic VII: For Blood and Honor, a card game named Arcomage can be played by visiting taverns.

=== Quest system ===
In typical Might and Magic fashion, the game is fairly non-linear, so quests can be completed at the player's own leisure, though the completion of storyline quests is essential for progression. Dialogue, lore and exploration are important to progression in the game, with some dungeons involving relevant puzzles. In addition, side quests and dungeons can warrant rewards if completed, but are not vital to the main storyline. Also, promotion quests can increase the capabilities of particular classes of character.

Like Might and Magic VII, the game includes a system of choices which affect fundamental aspects of gameplay. Throughout the course of the storyline, the player is given opportunities to side with either Dragons or Dragon Hunters, and either Sun Priests or Necromancers. These choices are permanent and affect several quests, NPC reactions and available recruitable characters. However, unlike its predecessor, which has two different endings based on which of the two in-game factions the player aligned with, neither side of the conflicts in VIII is labelled Good or Evil, and the game's ending sequence is not affected by the outcome of these choices.

== Plot ==
=== Backstory ===
Escaton summons the crystal in the city of Ravenshore.

Might and Magic VIII takes place on the fictional world of Enroth, upon the continent of Jadame, and acts as a sequel to Might and Magic VII and Heroes of Might and Magic III: Armageddon's Blade. Over a thousand years ago, the interstellar war between the Ancients and the demon-like Kreegan drove both races off of Enroth, one of the Ancients' many colony worlds. During the millennium since, the original colonists of that world (which include fantasy races as well as humans) built their own society and culture from the ruins, the stories of the Ancients and the Kreegan having long since passed into legend. Ten years ago, as depicted in Might and Magic VI: The Mandate of Heaven, the Kreegan invaded the world. The heroes of Might and Magic VI destroyed the Kreegan Queen, and the last of the Kreegan on the planet were wiped out over the course of Heroes of Might and Magic III: The Restoration of Erathia, Might and Magic VII: For Blood and Honor and Heroes III: Armageddon's Blade. The Ancients, however, anticipating disaster should the Kreegan manage to gain a foothold on the world, had already enacted a scorched earth plan: rather than let the world fall into the hands of their ancient enemies, they would see it destroyed outright.

An android servant of the Ancients, the planeswalker Escaton, arrives in the village of Ravenshore on the continent of Jadame. Approaching the center of town, he summons a giant crystal which unleashes an elemental storm across the continent. There is widespread destruction and the boundaries to the four Elemental Planes are breached. Now elementals and monsters from beyond the boundaries are threatening to invade, fulfilling Escaton's plan to draw the powers of the elements toward the crystal and destroy the world, and the player must assemble a party of heroes to prevent this.

The game features several recurring characters from previous titles in the series, including the Elemental Lords from Might and Magic II, the Ironfists from the Heroes of Might and Magic games, and the necromancers Sandro and Thant from Heroes of Might and Magic III.

=== Setting ===
A map of the continent of Jadame, showing the game's regions and towns

The continent of Jadame is first introduced in this game, previously unmentioned in the series. The four elemental gateways appear in the four corners of southern Jadame: the Gateway of Earth on one of the Dagger Wound Islands (southeast), the Gateway of Water in Ravage Roaming (southwest), the Gateway of Air in the Murmurwoods (northwest), and the Gateway of Fire in the Ironsand Desert (northeast). In each case they cause an environmental disaster: a volcano in the Dagger Wound Island chain erupts and the tremors destroy the bridges that link the Lizardman-inhabited islands, the Minotaur undercity in Ravage Roaming is flooded, the trees in a large area of the Murmurwoods are uprooted by the winds, and much of the Troll settlement in Ironsand is destroyed by an explosion of fire. Escaton raised an enormous crystal in the centre of the city of Ravenshore, which acts as the portal to the Plane Between Planes, where the Destroyer resides.

=== Scenario ===
- The initial character begins on the Dagger Wound Islands with low-level equipment, as a caravan guard employed by the Merchant Guild of Alvar (a land of Dark Elves). The pirates of Regna have used the cataclysm and resulting chaos to raid the Dagger Wound Islands. The pirates pose a threat to the player but are being continuously held at bay by the native Lizardmen, who are friendly to the player.
- The characters must find a way to leave the Dagger Wound Islands and reach the predominantly Dark Elven city of Ravenshore, the capital of Jadame, where their duty is to inform the local Merchant Guild branch of the cataclysm. More evidence is required, so the party is commissioned to 'persuade' the smuggling ring in Ravenshore, run by Wererats, to send boats to gather more information. The smugglers are required as the Regnan pirates and their navy pose an increasing threat to other ships.
- The characters are next sent to the Merchant Guild of Alvar, in Alvar City. Here, Bastian Loudrin, the High Guildmaster, recruits the party into his service and requests that more evidence be brought to him of the lake of fire which allegedly formed in the Ironsand Desert. He asks that a witness be brought to Alvar.
- In the Ironsand Desert, the characters locate a witness in the Troll-inhabited town of Rust. This Troll, Overdune Snapfinger, will not join the party and accompany them to Alvar until his deceased brother's ashes are placed in the family tomb, which is now infested with hostile Fire creatures.
- When the characters return to Alvar with Snapfinger, an old Dark Elven doomsday prophecy is explained - that the destruction of the world is imminent unless the land stands united. The party must attempt to make alliances with three of the various 'factions' of Jadame, many of which are at war with one another.
- The Minotaur city of Balthazar Lair in Ravage Roaming has become flooded and in order to gain an alliance with the Minotaurs, the characters must succeed in unflooding the lair. This must be done whilst fending off hostile Tritons from the Plane of Water. Unlike other alliances, the Minotaurs are not mutually exclusive with another faction.
- A choice must be made between allying with the Dragons of Garrotte Gorge or with the Dragon Hunters who are besieging them. This must be done by retrieving an egg from the Ogres in Ravage Roaming that contains the unborn heir to the King of the Dragons, Deftclaw Redreaver. Returning it to the Dragons ensures their cooperation, whereas entrusting it to the Dragon Hunters will gain their trust.
- Finally, a choice must be made between allying with the Necromancers of Shadowspire or the Temple of the Sun in the Murmurwoods. To ally with the Necromancers, the characters must take with them the double agent Cleric Dyson Leland (who was captured by the Necromancers after posing as one of them and is now bitter enough to help you assist either side) and steal the Nightshade Brazier, hidden in the Temple of the Sun, returning it to the Necromancers' Guild so that the Guild's Vampire allies can walk in the day. To ally with the Temple of the Sun instead, the player, with Dyson Leland in the party, must destroy the Skeleton Transformer in the bowels of the Necromancers' Guild.
- Once the three alliances have been accomplished, it is learned that the King and Queen of Enroth, who were major characters in previous games, are on their way to help, but are hindered by the Regnan fleet. The characters must find a way to sink the fleet.
- When the fleet is sunk, King Roland Ironfist and his wife, Queen Catherine, arrive at Ravenshore with their court sage, Xanthor. Xanthor says that he is able to fashion a key to gain access to Escaton's Crystal and hence the Plane Between Planes, but that in order to do this, he must use the heartstones of the four elemental planes.
- The characters are sent to the elemental planes and battle their way through hordes of raging creatures to take the heartstones. Upon the completion of this quest, Xanthor is able to fashion a 'Conflux Key' to Escaton's Crystal.
- In Escaton's Crystal, the party battles creatures constructed from crystal, which are difficult to destroy. At the end of the crystal, the player must complete a puzzle to operate the portal to the Plane Between Planes.
- The Plane Between Planes is a place of utter chaos, which has the effect of driving weaker creatures mad. The characters battle Nightmares, which are capable of causing insanity in the party members, along with other hostile creatures such as Plane Guardians and Ether Knights.
- The characters must seek out Escaton in his palace. The palace is filled with deadly foes whom you must fend off while searching for switches that open up different sections of the palace, which will be audibly noticeable. After flipping the final switch, you may approach Escaton's throne to learn that he has imprisoned the Lords of the Elemental Planes to prevent them from interfering with the convocation of elements that will destroy your planet and the unusual aggression he has afflicted their subjects with.
- The player must answer three riddles in order to receive the keys to their four prisons (Escaton's programming does not allow him to stop destroying the world even though the Kreegan have now been defeated by Catherine and Roland in Armageddon's Blade, but he is able to undermine his mission by giving your characters the keys). The four prisons, each constructed of that lord's opposing element, contain guards who must be fought through before reaching the lord's cage.
- When the lords of the planes have been freed, the characters return to Ravenshore to witness the destruction of Escaton's Crystal by the Elemental Lords and the restoration of peace to Jadame. In the Plane Between Planes, Escaton's palace collapses and he is fatally damaged, exposing his circuitry. Escaton sends a drone into space to tell the Ancients of his failure before dying.

== Reception ==
Reception

Aggregate score
Aggregator	Score
GameRankings	55%

Review scores
Publication	Score
CNET Gamecenter	4 out of 10
Computer Games Strategy Plus	3.5 out of 5
Computer Gaming World	2 out of 5
EP Daily	7 out of 10
Famitsu	(PS2) 24 out of 40
GameRevolution	D
GameSpot	6 out of 10
GameSpy	75%
GameZone	7.5 out of 10
IGN	6.5 out of 10
Next Generation	2 out of 5
PC Accelerator	4 out of 10
PC Gamer (UK)	27%
RPGFan	75%

The PC version of Might and Magic VIII received mixed reviews according to the review aggregation website GameRankings. It was regarded by many critics as surprisingly inferior to previous titles in the series, though still a passable game. IGN praised the game's rendered cutscenes, storyline, setting and background along with its overall consistency and expansion on the Might and Magic universe, noting these as particularly strong points, but was disappointed with in-game graphics and the reused engine's low modern capabilities, citing these as pitiful compared to other, more modern RPGs.

This was echoed by GameSpot's reviewer, who, though intrigued by the series' addictive charm, was displeased with Might and Magic VIII's tedious interface and pointed out the imbalance of the Dragon character class. GameRevolution's reviewer was dissatisfied with the plot, particularly in comparison to earlier titles, and felt the game was identical to both its prequels. Kevin Rice of NextGen said of the game, "This isn't the bottom of the barrel in RPG gaming, but you can see the bottom from here."

== Port ==
In Japan, the game was ported by Imagineer for the PlayStation 2 under the title Might and Magic: Day of the Destroyer (マイト アンド マジック 〜デイ･オブ･ザ･デストロイヤー〜, Maito ando Majikku 〜Dei obu za Desutoroiyā〜). The game has just a few minor changes. Before this port, the last game in the main series to appear on a console was Might and Magic III: Isles of Terra, almost ten years previously. Famitsu gave the game 24 out of 40.
