= Heroes of Might and Magic III: Armageddon's Blade =

- Developer: New World Computing
- Publisher: The 3DO Company
- Director: David Mullich
- Producers: Mark Caldwell; Jeff Blattner
- Designers: Jon Van Caneghem; Greg Fulton
- Composers: Paul Romero; Rob King; Steve Baca
- Series: Heroes of Might and Magic
- Platforms: Windows, Macintosh (Heroes III Complete only)
- Release: NA: September 29, 1999; EU: March 17, 2000
- Genre: Turn-based strategy
- Modes: Single-player, single-system multiplayer, or network play

Heroes of Might and Magic III: Armageddon's Blade is the first of two expansion packs for the turn-based strategy game Heroes of Might and Magic III. It was developed by New World Computing for Microsoft Windows and released by The 3DO Company in 1999.

== Gameplay ==
The most significant change in Armageddon's Blade is the addition of the Conflux town, bringing the total number of alignments in Heroes of Might and Magic III to nine. The town is themed around classical elements, and includes other creatures to round out the selection. Six new campaigns were included, one acting as a continuation of the base game's storyline, with the other five revolving around other adventures taking place in the same fictional world. Over 35 single scenarios were also added.

Returning as non-aligned units, several creature types from previous Heroes games make an appearance. These include Peasants, Boars, and Halflings. The expansion also introduced some new non-aligned creature types, such as the powerful Azure Dragon. Eleven new campaign heroes and two new artifacts – Armageddon's Blade and the Vial of Dragonblood – were introduced as well. Several new map objects, including special quest towers that only allow passage if the hero meets certain criteria defined by the author of the map, also appear here for the first time.

A random map generator included with the expansion allows players to create random maps using a variety of customizable parameters. Finally, a standalone campaign editor packaged with the game allows for the composition of new campaigns from individual scenario maps.

== Plot ==
Only one of the six new campaigns available in Armageddon's Blade directly concerns the main storyline. The events of Armageddon's Blade follow on from the events of Might and Magic VII: For Blood and Honor, in which the player party frees Roland Ironfist from the Kreegan stronghold Colony Zod, defeating the Kreegans' king, Xenofex, in the process. As the kingdom of Erathia struggles to rebuild following the Restoration Wars, the Kreegans of Eeofol launch a surprise invasion. Already war-weary, the forces of Queen Catherine are no match for the formidable Kreegan army.

Following the death of Xenofex, a usurper named Lucifer Kreegan takes control of Eeofol and, driven by a vision, begins to seek a means to fashion an ancient weapon known as Armageddon's Blade, capable of setting the world on fire. His general Xeron is tasked with locating the components for the Blade. To stop him, the armies of Erathia and AvLee launch an attack on Eeofol, unexpectedly receiving assistance from servants of the Lords of the four Elemental Planes in the form of the new Conflux towns that have mysteriously appeared. Queen Catherine and the recently liberated King Roland are assisted by the mysterious half-elven warrior Gelu in the ensuing war. Xeron obtains the Blade, but is defeated by Gelu on his return to Eeofol. Gelu claims the Blade, and, at the behest of Queen Catherine, uses it to slay Lucifer Kreegan. Following this event, the Ironfists return to Enroth and the Blade is passed on to Gelu. The story is continued in Heroes Chronicles: The Sword of Frost, eventually leading to a cataclysm that sets the stage for Heroes of Might and Magic IV.

In the "Armageddon's Blade" campaign, the player takes control of Queen Catherine Ironfist, the main character of Heroes of Might and Magic III: The Restoration of Erathia, as well as King Roland Ironfist, the protagonist of Heroes of Might and Magic II. New characters introduced include Gelu, a half-elven archer, and Xeron, leader of the Kreegan armies. The five standalone campaigns feature a multitude of previously unseen characters. "Dragon Slayer" features the Bracadan wizard Dracon, while "Festival of Life" introduces the Krewlod barbarian Kilgor, who has a prominent role at the outset of Heroes of Might and Magic IV. "Dragon's Blood" stars Mutare, a Dungeon Overlord of Nighon who transforms herself into a dragon and returns in Heroes Chronicles: Clash of the Dragons along with the Tatalian fire witch Adrienne, the protagonist of "Playing with Fire". Finally, the unlockable "Foolhardy Waywardness" campaign features the knight Sir Christian, who also returns in Heroes of Might and Magic IV. The epilogue of "Foolhardy Waywardness" explains the reason for Sir Christian's appearance as the player's starting hero in The Restoration of Erathia's first campaign, "Long Live the Queen".

== Development ==
Work on the Armageddon's Blade expansion began in early 1999. The developers originally intended to focus the storyline around the threat posed by a new, futuristic faction, the "Forge" alignment, allowing the game to act as a continuation to the "evil" ending of Might and Magic VII while showcasing the science fantasy aspect of the core Might and Magic series, which had never been evident in the Heroes of Might and Magic games. Although the Forge faction was almost completed and functional, some fans reacted negatively to its inclusion, believing that the inclusion of science fiction destroyed the Heroes series' fantasy-based atmosphere.

Midway through the expansion's development, New World Computing decided to scrap the Forge faction and removed all references to its existence from the game's storyline, instead building upon Might and Magic VII's "good" ending. To replace the Forge, they introduced an elemental-based faction, the Conflux, which had originally been meant for a later expansion. Due to the scrapping of the Forge halfway through the project, the developers and design artists suffered from a lack of time when completing the Conflux faction, and were forced to implement elemental creatures from the base game. This is evident if one takes a good look at the dwellings of the original four elementals within the Conflux town: they all use the same graphics as on the world map.

== Reception ==
Reception

Aggregate score
Aggregator	Score
GameRankings	88%

Review scores
Publication	Score
CNET Gamecenter	8 out of 10
Computer Games Strategy Plus	5 out of 5
Computer Gaming World	4.5 out of 5
GameRevolution	B+
GameSpot	8 out of 10
GameStar	86%
Génération 4	4 out of 6
IGN	9 out of 10
PC Games (DE)	79%

The game received favorable reviews, two points shy of universal acclaim, according to the review aggregation website GameRankings. IGN's Rich Rouse noted improvements made to the map editor and praised the amount of new content, while GameSpot's Andrew Seyoon Park focused on the addition of the Conflux alignment and subtle tweaks to the gameplay. GameRevolution's Duke Ferris was mildly disappointed with the Conflux town and its use of neutral creatures already included in the base game, but praised the campaign storyline and gameplay along with the addition of new features. Some reviews were critical of the lack of drastic changes to the base game, while pointing out that the core mechanics were in no need of major improvements.

The game won Computer Games Strategy Plus' 1999 "Add-on of the Year" award. The staff wrote, "Armageddon's Blade serves as a template for add-ons. It takes one of the better games of the year and makes it even better." It was a runner-up for "Best Expansion Pack" at GameSpot's Best & Worst of 1999 Awards, which went to Half-Life: Opposing Force.
