= Heroes Chronicles =

2000-01 Heroes of Might and Magic III level packs

- Warlords of the Wasteland cover art
- Developer: New World Computing
- Publisher: The 3DO Company
- Director: David Mullich
- Designer: Jon Van Caneghem
- Composers: Paul Romero; Rob King; Steve Baca
- Series: Heroes of Might and Magic
- Platform: Windows
- Release: September 27, 2000 - June 1, 2001 (Note: Due to region locking, The World Tree and The Fiery Moon were not playable outside of the US until the GOG re-release on June 23, 2011.)
- Genre: Turn-based strategy
- Mode: Single-player

Heroes Chronicles is an episodic series of level packs for Heroes of Might and Magic III, a turn-based strategy video game. Eight installments were released from September 2000 to June 2001, developed by Jon Van Caneghem through New World Computing and published by the 3DO Company. Heroes Chronicles tells the story of Tarnum, a barbarian judged unworthy of Paradise due to his crimes. He is made immortal and sent by the Ancestors to aid in various quests throughout the centuries as punishment.

Intended for newcomers to the franchise, they are low difficulty campaigns that were marketed at a reduced price, and do not require the original game to play. Two of the Chronicles chapters, The World Tree and The Fiery Moon, were freely available as downloads from the 3DO website at the time, to players who already owned a number of the commercially released chapters. Chronicles' reception was mixed as it was perceived as a cash-grab, and lacked the main game's multiplayer support. The complete series was re-released through GOG.com in June 2011.

== Gameplay ==
As Heroes Chronicles is a set of stand-alone level packs which run on an essentially unchanged version of the Heroes III engine, they feature the same turn-based strategy gameplay seen in the original. Each chapter features eight maps, except for the downloadable episodes The World Tree and The Fiery Moon, which had five. The maps are connected together into campaigns with some short CG cutscenes and a linking narrative. Unlike the original game, Chronicles does not support multiplayer.

Chronicles was intended to introduce a new audience to the franchise, and on that basis the installments are fairly short with a low difficulty. Eurogamer noted that there was some effort to limit the amount of town types on offer at any one time to avoid overwhelming the player with choices. The levels are also more generous in terms of resource availability.

== Plot ==
The first chapter, Warlords of the Wasteland, covers Tarnum's origin story as a barbarian king revolting against the Bracaduun wizards who dominate his people, hundreds of years before Heroes of Might and Magic III. While he is victorious, Tarnum enslaves the Mudlanders to do so, and his paranoia leads him to slaughter many innocents, even those who followed him. He is ultimately brought down by Sir Rion Gryphonheart, who becomes the first king of Erathia, but the Ancestors judge Tarnum unworthy of Paradise.

In the second chapter, Conquest of the Underworld, set decades later, Rion's soul is stolen from Paradise, and so the Ancestors punish Tarnum by resurrecting him, making him immortal, and sending him on a quest to retrieve Rion from the Underworld. Tarnum adopts the mantle of a knight as he aids Rion's daughter Queen Allison (whose mother was secretly one of Tarnum's long-lost sisters) in this venture, and in the end rescues her.

In the third chapter, Masters of the Elements, the 10,000 year truce between the four Elemental Lords expires and Tarnum is sent to confront them in the elemental planes to prevent them from using the mortal world as a battlefield and destroying it in the process. In order to face the elementals, Tarnum must work with the wizards of Bracada led by Gavin Magnus and eventually become a wizard, despite his hatred of the craft. He fights the elemental lords on their home planes, pursues and defeats them back in Antagarich, and promptly abandons wizardry.

In the fourth chapter, Clash of the Dragons (set after Heroes of Might and Magic III: Armageddon's Blade), having spent 20 years living among the rangers of AvLee, Tarnum aids them against the dragon queen Mutare, who now leads the forces of Nighon. He grows frustrated with his immortality, but develops a kinship with the long-lived dragons of AvLee.

In the fifth chapter, The World Tree (set in an indefinite place on the timeline), Tarnum learns of barbarians and necromancers who are being supported by Vorr, one of the Ancestors who has gone mad. The group are attempting to destroy the World Tree, a network of verdant underground tunnels that are responsible for life in the world above. The current barbarian king Targor has modelled his rule after Tarnum's tyrannical past, but Tarnum convinces him to disavow Vorr. With many of the necromancers killed, Vorr abandons the project. This leads into the sixth chapter, The Fiery Moon, where Vorr captures the other Ancestors and takes them to the titular Fiery Moon, a planetoid long-since conquered by Kreegan demons. Tarnum - now rapidly aging as his immortality has been compromised by the absence of his gods - crosses the Sparkling Bridge to confront Vorr on the Fiery Moon. After defeating Vorr in battle, Tarnum uses sap from the World Tree to cure him. Seeing the effects, Tarnum finally believes that he can change and is not defined by his past.

In the seventh chapter, Revolt of the Beastmasters (set some time between Conquest of the Underworld and Masters of the Elements, and thus centuries before Clash of the Dragons), the Ancestors offer Tarnum the chance to make amends for his crimes as a barbarian king. He is sent to free the Mudlanders - the people he enslaved as a mortal - from their current Erathian rulers. He becomes a beastmaster himself to aid the Mudlanders, forms them into the nation of Tatalia seen in Heroes III, and faces off against Rion and Allison's descendant, Mad King Gryphonheart, whose son Niven becomes the next Erathian king after being convinced by Tarnum to rebel against his father's cruelty.

In the eighth and final chapter, The Sword of Frost (set after Clash of the Dragons), Gelu sets out to retrieve the titular blade despite an apocalyptic prophecy that the world will be destroyed if it should ever clash with Armageddon's Blade - which is already in Gelu's possession due to the events of Heroes III: Armageddon's Blade. Over the centuries, Tarnum has prepared caches of resources for such an emergency. He poses as a Nighon overlord - stepping into a power void left by Mutare's defeat - to lead armies of monsters against Gelu and the barbarian king Kilgor, who is also searching for the sword. In the end, Tarnum reaches the home of the sword in the city of Volee, only to find that Kilgor's wife Kija has already stolen it. The final chapter sets up the events leading to the destruction of Enroth in Heroes of Might and Magic IV, where Tarnum reappears.

== Release and format ==
Warlords of the Wasteland, Conquest of the Underworld, Masters of the Elements and Clash of the Dragons were retail releases sold individually, generally at about half the price of the original game. The discs also include sample maps from the other installments- which were billed as "interactive trailers". They were released in two batches, with the first two in September, and the second two in November 2000.

The World Tree and The Fiery Moon were downloadable chapters and not sold on discs. Both were both made available in late 2000 alongside the batches of retail releases- The World Tree releasing the same week as the first set, and The Fiery Moon releasing alongside the second set. These chapters were freely available from the Chronicles website, however they required the target computer to have some of the retail packs already installed. The World Tree required any two retail packs, while The Fiery Moon required any three on the target system. The installers were only compatible with the US version of the games, which meant that they were not playable outside of that territory. They also required one of the discs from the earlier packs to be in the disc drive to run. The website indicated the chapters would only be available until January 28, 2001, however the files remained available after the deadline expired. A notice was added to the page stating that "The official download deadline has passed, but we're leaving these files up for an indeterminate time as a courtesy to our fans." They remained available until 3DO collapsed in 2003 and the website went down.

The seventh and eighth chapters, Revolt of the Beastmasters and The Sword of Frost, were bundled together and sold as The Final Chapters on a single disc in June 2001. The Chronicles campaigns were not among the content included in Heroes of Might and Magic III: Complete, which released on November 17, 2000. At that stage only six of the eight Chronicles campaigns had launched, some of them only days earlier.

All eight chapters were re-released through GOG.com on June 23, 2011, with the pack simply labeled as All Chapters. The GOG re-release did not have the same regional requirements for The World Tree and The Fiery Moon, which made those playable for the first time outside of the United States.

== Chapters ==
The chapters were not originally given a formal order; this was unclear at the time given that the series involves time travel and most installments are episodic in nature. The numbering in the table below reflects the 2011 GOG re-release, which places the downloadable chapters after the first four retail discs, rather than adhering strictly to release order.

No.	Name	Release date	Original format
1	Warlords of the Wasteland	September 27, 2000	Individual retail
2	Conquest of the Underworld	September 27, 2000	Individual retail
3	Masters of the Elements	November 14, 2000	Individual retail
4	Clash of the Dragons	November 14, 2000	Individual retail
5	The World Tree	September 29, 2000	Free download
6	The Fiery Moon	November 13, 2000 (Note: The Fiery Moon was made available for download a day before Master of the Elements and Clash of Dragons launched, but was unplayable until at least one of those games was installed on the target system.)	Free download
7	Revolt of the Beastmasters	June 1, 2001	Retail, bundled as The Final Chapters
8	The Sword of Frost	June 1, 2001	Retail, bundled as The Final Chapters

== Reception ==
Reception was generally mixed. While the gameplay was still the same good standard Heroes III was known for, critics described the level pack series as a cash grab or rip-off, criticising the lack of new gameplay features. The Complete version of Heroes III launched around the same time and offered significantly more content for the price of two Chronicles chapters. The Spanish language game magazine Extreme PC reviewed the first four chapters and gave the series 79%, citing the loss of multiplayer support. Eurogamer was also critical of the writing, commenting that it was "fairly poorly written, at times long-winded, and rather stilted".
