= Nuclear War (disambiguation) =

A nuclear war is a war in which nuclear weapons are used.

Nuclear War may also refer to:

- Nuclear War (card game)
- Nuclear War (video game)
- Nuclear War, an album by Sun Ra, and its title track
- Nuclear War, an EP by Yo La Tengo
- "Nuclear War (On the Dance Floor)", a song by Electric Six from Fire
