= Jon Van Caneghem =

American video game designer

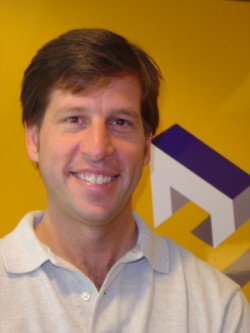
- Born: 1962 or 1963 (age 63–64)
- Education: University of California, Los Angeles (UCLA)
- Occupation: Game designer
- Notable work: Might and Magic series Heroes of Might and Magic series
- Children: Amanda (daughter)
- Awards: Computer Gaming World Hall of Fame

Jon Van Caneghem (born 1962/1963) is an American video game director, designer and producer. He launched the development studio New World Computing in 1983, making his design debut in 1986 with Might and Magic Book One: The Secret of the Inner Sanctum. During the company's 20-year history, Van Caneghem was involved in the creation and direction of several franchises, including the Might and Magic role-playing series and the spin-off Heroes of Might and Magic and King's Bounty strategy series.

== Early life ==
Van Caneghem was raised on the Sunset Strip in West Hollywood, California, United States, by his mother, an artist, and his stepfather, a neurologist at University of California, Los Angeles (UCLA). He attended grade school at Lycée Français de Los Angeles and his collegiate alma mater is UCLA, where he started as a pre-med student and graduated with a degree in computer science.

== Career ==
In 1983, Van Caneghem founded New World Computing, a publisher and developer of video games for computers and consoles.

Their first title was the medieval fantasy Might and Magic: Secret of the Inner Sanctum—one of the first role-playing games to feature detailed drawings of both indoor and outdoor locations. It debuted in 1986 for the Apple II. The series went on to include nine bestselling games, all of which Van Caneghem co-created. In 1990 Van Caneghem released King's Bounty, the forerunner of the Heroes of Might and Magic series of seven games which feature turn-based, fantasy-themed conflicts in which players control armies of mythical creatures.

In the following 20 years as president and CEO of New World Computing, Van Caneghem oversaw the publishing of more than 250 titles worldwide.

Van Caneghem sold New World Computing to developer and publisher 3DO in 1996 for US$13 million. He remained with 3DO as president and "lead visionary" until 2003 when 3DO filed for bankruptcy and eliminated its New World Computing division. The rights to the Might and Magic name were purchased for $1.3 million by Ubisoft, which revived the franchise with a new series under the same name.

From 2004 to 2005, Van Caneghem worked at NCSoft as executive producer of a massively multiplayer online game. In 2006 Van Caneghem left NCSoft and launched Trion World Network, headquartered in Redwood City, California, after securing more than $100 million in investment capital from Time Warner, NBC Universal, GE and Bertelsmann. Trion produces server-side games.

Van Caneghem left Trion in 2009 and joined Electronic Arts where he headed the video game giant's Command & Conquer brand. Van Caneghem was responsible for extending the series online. On 29 October 2013, EA cancelled the development of the Command & Conquer game and closed the development studio.

In 2014, Caneghem founded VC Mobile Entertainment (VCME) with the goal to produce and publish iOS and Android games. Caneghem secured $4.5 million in capital investment from companies like Tencent and Pacific Sky Investments. VCME is based in Los Angeles, and currently has around 15 employees. Their first game, Creature Quest, is a mobile game focused on collection of creatures with which to quest and explore. It is an RPG with turn-based combat similar to Might & Magic and isometric exploration reminiscent of Heroes of Might & Magic. It was launched globally early 2017, after a successful limited test launch in selected countries in Europe and Australia. As of February 2024, Creature Quest has been shut down indefinitely.

== Awards ==
Van Caneghem was inducted into the Computer Gaming World Hall of Fame in 2004 for Strategy and Role-Playing. The first Might and Magic game is number 44 in Computer Gaming World's Hall of Fame, and Heroes of Might and Magic II is number 31. Heroes of Might and Magic I won Strategy Game of the Year from Computer Gaming World, Turn-Based Strategy Game of the Year from Strategy Plus, Editor's Choice from PC Gamer, and Golden Triad from Computer Game Review.

== Personal life ==
Van Caneghem lives in Los Angeles and has a daughter, Amanda.

Van Caneghem is an avid race car driver and has won or placed in races regularly since the 1990s. This hobby grew from his unofficial races down Mulholland Drive in the Hollywood hills and in the early '90s grew into a more serious hobby on racetracks across the country, including winning the West Coast Formula Ford championship. He attended the Skip Barber Racing School during this time.

Van Caneghem has competed in over 100 races with dozens of wins with the Sports Car Club of America where he competed in GT2, CSR, DSR, S7, SGT, and Pro7. With Nasa Pro Racing, he competed in Mazda-GT, ST2, STR2. Van Caneghem also won races with Cal Club, including the SGT2 Season Winner in 2005.

== Games ==
- Might and Magic I, 1986, designer/programmer
- Might and Magic II, 1988, designer/programmer
- Nuclear War, 1989, designer
- Tunnels & Trolls: Crusaders of Khazan, 1990, director
- King's Bounty, 1990, designer
- Might and Magic III, 1991, director/designer
- Planet's Edge, 1992, director/designer
- Might and Magic IV: Clouds of Xeen, 1992, director/designer
- Might and Magic V: Darkside of Xeen, 1993, director/designer
- Zephyr, 1994, designer
- Inherit the Earth: Quest for the Orb, 1994, executive producer
- Hammer of the Gods, 1994, executive producer
- Wetlands, 1995, executive producer
- Multimedia Celebrity Poker, 1995, original concept/executive producer
- Heroes of Might and Magic: A Strategic Quest, 1995, designer
- Anvil of Dawn, 1995, executive producer
- Empire II: The Art of War, 1995, executive producer
- Heroes of Might and Magic II, 1996, director/designer
- Heroes of Might and Magic II: The Price of Loyalty, 1997, designer
- Might and Magic VI: The Mandate of Heaven, 1998, designer
- Might and Magic VII: For Blood and Honor, 1999, designer
- Heroes of Might and Magic III, 1999, designer
- Heroes of Might and Magic III: Armageddon's Blade, 1999, designer
- Heroes of Might and Magic III: The Shadow of Death, 2000, designer
- Crusaders of Might and Magic, 1999, special thanks
- Might and Magic VIII: Day of the Destroyer, 2000, designer
- Heroes Chronicles: Warlords of the Wastelands, 2000, designer
- Heroes Chronicles: Masters of the Elements, 2000, designer
- Heroes Chronicles: Conquest of the Underworld, 2000, designer
- Heroes Chronicles: Clash of the Dragons, 2000, designer
- Heroes of Might and Magic: Quest for the Dragon Bone Staff, 2001, designer
- Heroes Chronicles: The Final Chapters, 2001, designer
- Legends of Might and Magic, 2001, designer
- Command & Conquer, cancelled
- Creature Quest, 2017
- Heroes of Might and Magic: Olden Era, 2026, creative advisor
