= Heroes of Might and Magic: Quest for the Dragon Bone Staff =

2001 video game

- North American cover art
- Developer: New World Computing
- Publisher: The 3DO Company
- Director: Mark Caldwell
- Producer: Jeffrey W. Blattner
- Designers: Jon Van Caneghem; Mark Caldwell
- Programmer: Bob Young
- Artist: Scott White
- Writer: Terry Ray
- Composers: Paul Romero; Rob King; Steve Baca
- Series: Heroes of Might and Magic
- Platform: PlayStation 2
- Release: NA: April 17, 2001; EU: June 1, 2001
- Genre: Turn-based strategy
- Mode: Single-player

Heroes of Might and Magic: Quest for the Dragon Bone Staff is a 2001 video game released on the PlayStation 2. Though 3DO did not advertise it as such, the game is an enhanced remake of King's Bounty. It is primarily a graphics enhancement and it appears that little of the text has changed. Because of its dated gameplay, the game bears little relation to the rest of the Heroes of Might and Magic series.

== Reception ==
Reception

Aggregate score
Aggregator	Score
Metacritic	64/100

Review scores
Publication	Score
Consoles +	83%
EP Daily	6.5/10
Game Informer	4.5/10
GameRevolution	C−
GameSpot	5.2/10
GameZone	7/10
IGN	7.7/10
Jeuxvideo.com	6/20
Next Generation	3/5
Official U.S. PlayStation Magazine	2.5/5

The game received "mixed" reviews according to the review aggregation website Metacritic. Daniel Erickson of NextGen said that the game was "Not as deep as the PC series it's named after, but just as fun and much more accessible."
