= Heroes of Might and Magic II: The Price of Loyalty =

1997 video game

- Developer: Cyberlore Studios
- Publisher: The 3DO Company
- Directors: Seth Spaulding; Thomas Gale
- Producers: Lester Humphreys; Joe Minton
- Designers: Jim Dubois; Jessie King; Chris Greenia
- Programmer: Mike White
- Artists: Michael Clarke; Michael Baker; Julie Airoldi
- Composers: Paul Romero; Rob King; Steve Baca
- Series: Heroes
- Platforms: MS-DOS, Windows
- Release: May 1997
- Genre: Turn-based strategy
- Modes: Single-player, Multiplayer

Heroes of Might and Magic II: The Price of Loyalty is the expansion pack of the turn-based strategy game Heroes of Might and Magic II. It was developed by Cyberlore Studios and released by The 3DO Company in 1997. The Price of Loyalty was the first official expansion to the Heroes of Might and Magic series. Development of the game was contracted to Cyberlore, unlike the original game, which was developed by New World Computing.

== Gameplay ==
The expansion added four new campaigns, 17 new artifacts, 30 new scenario maps, new in-map buildings and an improved map editor. It also added a new structure for the Necromancer faction—a shrine that enhanced the heroes' ability to raise the dead (Necromancy Skills)—as well as 11 new heroes that are featured in the campaigns. The soundtrack of the expansion added new themes for each town.

== Plot ==
The expansion features four standalone campaigns, each of which tells a different story that does not have any connection to the original game or the other campaigns. Although it is not stated if they take place on the fictional planet Enroth, the setting of the first three Heroes of Might and Magic games, the series' lead designer Gregory Fulton believes it is the case and considers the expansion canon.

- In the main campaign, The Price of Loyalty, the player character is sent to capture his old friend Viscount Kraeger, who has turned against the Empire and is gathering the pieces of a powerful artifact to aid in its overthrow. It is later discovered that Kraeger has been mind-controlled by a cabal of necromancers. After freeing him from the necromancers' hold and putting an end to his rebellion, the protagonist defeats the necromancers.
- Voyage Home follows the knight Gallavant on his journey home. After his ship is wrecked in a storm, he builds a new one and battles pirates on his way to the mainland kingdom. Upon returning home, he becomes embroiled in a civil war and must choose to side with either his lord or his sister.
- Wizard's Isle is about a group of wizards fighting for control of the Fount of Wizardry, which brings great arcane, magical power. The one who claims it will have the power to shape a new age of magic and rule for the next thousand years.
- Descendants explores the establishment of the kingdom of Jarkonas and its war with the rival kingdom of Harondale, which wages on for many generations.

== Reception ==
Reception

Review scores
Publication	Score
GameSpot	6.9/10
Strana Igr	8 out of 10

Sergey Ovchinnikov of Strana Igr believed that The Price of Loyalty would have been greatly improved by introducing more new content, such as new creatures or a new hero class, but still considered it a well-made expansion to one of the best games of the year. GameSpot's Ron Dulin praised the expansion for diversifying the types of missions in campaigns, which he regarded as an improvement over the original game, as well as their balanced difficulty, but criticized the lack of significant gameplay additions such as new creature upgrades or spells. Theodore Rimspoke mostly approved the new features, but expressed a few disappointments, stating that the new map locations did not substantially impact the game (despite regarding them as the most exciting feature) and also believing the expansion could have introduced more interesting additions. Furthermore, he pointed out that certain additions may give unfair advantages to players, such as the possibility of an enhanced necromancy skill and the ability for ghosts to increase their armies as they kill opponents.
