= Chaos Overlords =

1996 video game

- Developer: Stick Man Games
- Publisher: New World Computing
- Designer: John K. Morris
- Platforms: Windows, Mac OS
- Release: May 10, 1996; February 17, 1998 (Japan); February 17, 1998 (Europe); May 28, 2013 (GOG.com)
- Genre: Turn-based strategy
- Modes: Single-player, multiplayer

Chaos Overlords is a turn-based strategy computer game developed by Stick Man Games and published by New World Computing for Microsoft Windows and classic Mac OS in 1996. Chaos Overlords was re-released for Windows in downloadable format by GOG.com in May, 2013.

== Setting ==
Gangs working for rival Chaos Overlords engage in combat.

Chaos Overlords is set in a dystopian cyberpunk future. By 2046, private industries started to purchase bankrupt national governments. By 2050, all governments had merged under one corporation, the World United Solidarity (WUS). WUS became a corrupt monopoly, and attempted to control the population by instituting censorship and banning ownership of weapons, drugs and pornography. Former crime lords and corporate heads arose to exploit the people by creating "chaos": selling drugs, guns, and pornography, running the numbers, and engaging in extortion and blackmail. These criminals, known as Chaos Overlords, bribed WUS to avoid crackdowns. As gangs joined them and they grew in power, cities became battlegrounds for their struggles to destroy each other in pursuit of money and power.

== Gameplay ==
The player takes the role of a Chaos Overlord attempting to control a city. Gameplay involves hiring mercenary gangs and deploying them on an 8-by-8 grid of city sectors to generate income, occupy sectors and take over the city. The player can choose from 10 different victory conditions. The four timed scenarios involve attaining the most cash, sectors, support, or all three. The six objective scenarios have no time limit and require the player to fulfill a specific goal, ranging from killing all other Chaos Overlords to controlling specific sectors of importance.

== Reception ==
Reception

Review scores
Publication	Score
Next Generation	3/5
Arcane	5/10
Computer Game Review	80/100
PC Entertainment	B

Chaos Overlords attracted mixed reviews from the gaming press. GameSpot praised its addictive qualities, while Allgame noted its ability to generate strategic depth from a simple game concept. Computer Gaming World criticized the game's rough presentation and monotonous graphics, but commented that dedicated gamers with the patience to look past first impressions would be rewarded with a "novel, truly strategic wargame". Next Generation found the turn-based, menu-driven gameplay made it less exciting than Syndicate, but praised the variety of scenarios and support for online play, and concluded, "It's no replacement for the likes of Warcraft 2 or Duke Nukem 3D, but it's a decent showing from the creators of Heroes of Might and Magic." Inside Mac Games rated the game 3 out of 5, calling it a "very challenging strategic wargame" with a "strong and honest AI opponent." The review felt the game became fun only after spending hours learning the game's mechanics and interface.

Andy Butcher reviewed Chaos Overlords for Arcane magazine, rating it a 5 out of 10 overall. Butcher comments that "If you've got the luxury of a multi-player link-up, Chaos Overlords has a lot to recommend it. Otherwise, there are much better strategy games around."

In a retrospective for IGN, gaming journalist Tom Chick praised the clarity of the game's design, claiming its "elegant and exciting" gameplay was hampered mainly by a mouse-intensive interface.

== Reviews ==
- The Duelist #13
- Australian Realms #29

== Sequel ==
Chaos Overlords developer John K. Morris began work on a sequel in 2006. As of September 2008, development was indefinitely on hold. In December 2009, Morris announced active development on the sequel with three members of the original development team (names not specified), but provided no indication of a potential release date. Morris updated the Evolution Interactive blog May 5, 2010, to indicate Chaos Overlords 2 was still under development but had been put on hold for another project. The development team has also joined Facebook. A recent post (2013) hinted that the project was still on hold.
