= Legends of Might and Magic =

2001 video game

- Developer: New World Computing
- Publisher: 3DO
- Director: Benjamin Bent
- Producer: Peter Ryu
- Designers: Bryan Farina; Jon Van Caneghem; Christian Vanover; Ken Spencer
- Programmer: Jeff Leggett
- Composers: Robert King; Paul Romero
- Series: Might and Magic
- Engine: Lithtech 2.0
- Platform: Microsoft Windows
- Release: NA: June 19, 2001; EU: June 29, 2001
- Genres: Action, First-person shooter
- Mode: Multiplayer

Legends of Might and Magic is a first-person shooter video game developed by Jon Van Caneghem through New World Computing and published by The 3DO Company in 2001. As a spin-off of the Might and Magic franchise, Legends has a fantasy theme. Reviews likened the game to a medieval Counter-Strike, but criticized it for being a mediocre clone.

== Gameplay ==
Gameplay in Legends takes place almost entirely online. An offline practice mode exists, but the game does not provide bots to simulate actual gameplay conditions. Players pick a server, and then choose from six classes of either the evil team or the good team. The evil team consists of the Heretic, Archer and Warrior, and the good team of the Paladin, Druid and Sorceress. The players then start a match on a chosen map and compete in one of the following objective-based game modes, each of which is associated with a map type:

- Sword in the Stone: Each team must attempt to gain control of the sword and reach the exit. It is essentially a variation of one-flag CTF.
- Rescue the Princess: The good team must try to save a princess who is guarded by the evil team. This mode is similar to the hostage rescue mode in Counter-Strike.
- Warlord Escape: A player assumes the role of the warlord, who must be escorted by the others to safety. This is nearly identical to the VIP missions in Counter-Strike.
- Slay the Dragon: Both teams battle while searching for a fire-breathing dragon, which is present somewhere in the gameplay area. The team that kills the dragon wins the match.

In addition to the opposing team, hostile creatures such as animated skeletons or dwarves may be present for players to fight (the host of each game decides whether or not there will be monsters). Players may obtain more effective equipment and other items by purchasing them with gold; which is earned by killing monsters and opening treasure chests found on the map, and also by winning rounds. Players lose these items when they die or at the end of a match, whichever comes first. This was another flaw attributed to the game; as players lose everything once matches end and start with only basic gear at the start of each new one, there was no long-term reward and no way for more experienced players to gauge their skill against the less experienced.

== Development ==
Legends of Might and Magic was announced at the 2000 E3 by 3DO as the first Might and Magic game designed for online play. At the time, it was intended to be an Action/RPG that focused on co-operative multiplayer. With up to six players able to join up, the game was not as extensive as MMORPGs of the time, but it also included 16-player deathmatch, a random adventure generator, and a player vs. monster arena. The game would allow characters to choose one of six classes with differing proficiencies in might and magic before embarking on a quest to collect four artifacts from four worlds to defeat the deranged advisor to the king before he can alter history. The assignments given to the players would depend on their level and how far they had progressed.

By the beginning of 2001, however, the game had abandoned the Action/RPG elements and had become a deathmatch game, with six proposed gameplay modes, 25 maps from Might and Magic history, and the ability for weapons, skills, abilities, and equipment to carry over between games. The move was defended by Executive Producer Jeffrey Blattner, who said:

"We got to a certain checkpoint some time ago and examined what we had. One thing we pride ourselves on at New World is the gameplay, and we just didn't feel like we would be able to deliver a fun experience for people with what we had at the time, so at that point a decision was made to not proceed in the original direction, and instead we decided to make a different type of game," explains Executive Producer Jeffrey Blattner. "The Might and Magic series is already so varied in terms of gameplay anyway. We have the Heroes strategy series and the tried and true Might and Magic RPG series, and everyone was really interested in branching out into an action style game, so that's how we found ourselves here. The original goal of Legends was to deliver the first online Might and Magic game, and we're still going to do that."

A demo for the game was released on April 18, 2001. On June 8 it went gold. The first patch (Version 1.1) came out on July 20.

== Reception ==
=== Critical reviews ===
Reception

Aggregate score
Aggregator	Score
Metacritic	53 out of 100

Review scores
Publication	Score
Computer Games Magazine	2 out of 5
Computer Gaming World	1.5 out of 5
GameRevolution	C
GameSpot	5.7 out of 10
GameSpy	69%
IGN	5.5 out of 10
Jeuxvideo.com	14 out of 20
Next Generation	2 out of 5
PC Gamer (US)	79%
PC PowerPlay	40%

Legends of Might and Magic received "mixed" reviews according to the review aggregation website Metacritic. The game was likened to a fantasy version of Counter-Strike by most reviewers; according to Tal Blevins of IGN, Legends "pretty much blatantly rips off Counter-Strike." Blevins also criticized the game for its lack of strategy, lack of differences between classes, and unbalanced weapons. Will Abner of GameSpy criticized the game for its poor implementation of single-player gameplay and lack of a map editor. The LithTech-based graphics were praised, however, and the game was said to have potential to grow. Scott Osborne of GameSpot criticized the game for its uninspired similarities to Counter-Strike, oping that "if mediocrity and complacency were crimes, Legends of Might and Magic would get tossed in the dungeon." Carla Harker of NextGen said of the game, "Unoriginal and uninspiring, this team-based FPS is not the stuff of legends."
