= Multimedia Celebrity Poker =

1995 video game

- Developer: New World Computing
- Publisher: New World Computing
- Designer: Jon Van Caneghem
- Platform: Windows 3.x
- Release: 1995
- Mode: Single-player

Multimedia Celebrity Poker is a 1995 poker video game developed and published by New World Computing.

== Gameplay and concept ==
Multimedia Celebrity Poker is a simulation of the card game poker, in which the player competes with celebrities Jonathan Frakes, Morgan Fairchild and Joe Piscopo. The actors are presented via full-motion video.

== Reception ==
Reception

Review scores
Publication	Score
Computer Gaming World	2.5/5
PC Gamer (US)	58%
Computer Game Review	83/87/78
Electronic Entertainment	2/5

Multimedia Celebrity Poker won a negative review from PC Gamer US, whose writer Michael Wolf called it "just a poker sim with a gimmick" that "wears off as quickly as the video starts repeating itself". Donald St. John of Electronic Entertainment found the game "not good at all". Computer Gaming World's Alan Emrich was more positive, writing, "As a purely entertaining experience, which is clearly what New World had in mind for this product, it succeeds, but with considerable limitations."
