= Planet's Edge =

1992 video game

- Developer: New World Computing
- Publisher: New World Computing
- Directors: Eric Hyman; Jon Van Caneghem
- Designers: Neal Hallford; Eric Hyman; Kenneth L. Mayfield; Jon Van Caneghem
- Programmers: Eric Hyman; Todd Hendrix
- Artists: Kenneth L. Mayfield; Jonathan P. Gwyn; Louis Johnson
- Writer: Neal Hallford
- Composers: George Sanger; Howard Fredrics; Tim Tully; Rob Wallace; Greg Alper; Paul Potyen; Neal Hallford; Paul Lehrman
- Platforms: MS-DOS, FM Towns, PC-98
- Release: 1992
- Genre: Role-playing video game
- Mode: Single-player

Planet's Edge is a 1992 space science fiction role-playing video game developed by New World Computing with Eric Hyman as the lead designer. The game's plot centers on investigating the sudden disappearance of planet Earth, by venturing out into the universe from a Moon base. There are two main play modes: real-time exploration and combat using various spacecraft, and turn-based exploration, problem solving, and combat on the surface of dozens of planets. The game features a variety of objects, weapons, and missions, though it lacks any detailed experience or stats system for the four characters the player controls.

== Plot ==
Just prior to the start of the game, a mysterious alien spaceship approaches the Earth to conduct an experiment which goes terribly wrong and causes the Earth to disappear into a wormhole trap. A scientific research team based on the Moon determines that the only way to bring the Earth and all its inhabitants back involves recreating this failed experiment, but experimental apparatus, called the Centauri Drive, has been destroyed in this accident. Nonetheless, Moonbase scientists are able to salvage enough technology from the wrecked alien craft to construct their own rudimentary spaceship. A four-member scientific team commanded by the player is put together to find and obtain the parts necessary to rebuild the Centauri Drive and thereby save the Earth. This is the primary goal of the game.

The story begins in the Solar System, but the fictional setting encompasses over a hundred stars and their associated planets and civilizations in the surrounding galaxy. The game world divides the interstellar space surrounding the Sun into eight sectors characterized by particular alien civilizations possessing varying degrees of technological sophistication. Each of the eight sectors is associated with a particular subplot which must be solved in order to gain access to each of the eight pieces necessary to complete the construction of the Centauri Drive.

== Gameplay ==
The game begins on Moonbase with the player in command of a spaceship crewed by a four-member scientific team. Here the player has the options of allocating available resources to the construction of new spaceships, weapons or other items, or of cloning crew members. Cloning randomly changes the statistical values assigned to the attributes and skills of the four team members commanded by the player; it does not change their identities. These statistics remain constant throughout the game unless the team members are subsequently re-cloned.

Once a spaceship has been outfitted and launched, the player controls it in real-time from an overhead, third-person, perspective by issuing commands to team members selected from a menu. The ship can travel from one planetary system to another and can be maneuvered into orbit around various planets. Some planets have useful resources which can be mined from orbit or locations to which the four member team can beam down. Along the way, other alien spaceships may be encountered. Some offer opportunities for trade or obtaining information, but others have piratical or hostile intentions. If combat ensues, it is resolved in an action sequence similar to that found in Starflight or Star Control in which the player must destroy the attacking vessels.

When a planet with a suitable beam-down location is encountered, the four person scientific team may beam down and explore it. The player controls the team members from an overhead isometric view similar to that used in a number of other role-playing video games including Ultima VI. Movement, interaction with objects and non-player characters, and ground combat are all turn-based. Commands are issued to team members via a selection of clickable icons displayed on the screen or hotkeys.

An important aspect of gameplay involves mining planets for resources and acquiring new technology for the purpose of constructing more powerful ships, weapons and armor. These items allow the player to venture successfully into the more technologically advanced sectors and obtain all parts necessary to complete the construction of the Centauri Device.

== Development ==
This game evolved from an effort to develop a computer adaptation of Star Fleet Battles. Following Neal Hallford's work on Tunnels & Trolls: Crusaders of Khazan, he was promoted to designer by New World Computing founder Jon Van Caneghem and was tasked with beginning development on both Planet's Edge and Might and Magic III: Isles of Terra. However, Ron Bolinger was later brought in to complete the design of Might and Magic III so that Hallford could focus his efforts on Planet's Edge's story, dialogue and game maps.

== Reception ==
In the July 1992 issue of Computer Gaming World, reviewer Chris Lombardi referred to Planet's Edge as a "solid, charming game with a few lumps in the dough". He commended its "rich story, good play balance and many hours of game play", but also drew attention to a few bugs in the game mechanics and shortcomings in the game's graphics and user interface. In another review published in PC Magazine, Barry Brenesal is generally positive about the game, but considers its "single weak element" to be its handling of ground character movement. On planetary excursions, team members often become separated when the party is traveling through doors or corridors with multiple paths. Reviewer Scott A. May, writing for Compute!, declared the game to be a "minor masterpiece of size, imagination, and diversity of play" marred by a "few rough spots" including "a clumsy, limited character interface" for controlling team members during planetary exploration. The game was also reviewed in 1992 in Dragon #182 by Hartley, Patricia, and Kirk Lesser in "The Role of Computers" column. The reviewers gave the game 4 out of 5 stars.

Jim Trunzo reviewed Planet's Edge in White Wolf #33 (Sept./Oct., 1992), rating it a 4 out of 5 and stated that "Planet's Edge should be one of the best games in its genre. This one is highly recommended for its play value and its enjoyment quotient."

It was nominated in November 1992 for Computer Gaming World's role-playing game of the year award because it reveals new creativity in the types of worlds to be explored and puzzles to be solved.
