= Heroes of Might and Magic IV =

2002 video game

- Developer: New World Computing
- Publisher: The 3DO Company
- Director: David Mullich
- Producer: James W. Dickinson
- Designer: Gus Smedstad
- Programmer: Gus Smedstad
- Artists: Joseph McGuffin; Fernando Castillo
- Writer: Terry Ray
- Composers: Paul Romero; Rob King; Steve Baca; Paul James
- Series: Heroes of Might and Magic
- Platforms: Microsoft Windows, Mac OS
- Release: March 28, 2002: NA: March 28, 2002; EU: April 25, 2002; NA: November 13, 2002 (Mac) The Gathering Storm; NA: September 27, 2002; EU: 2002 Winds of War; NA: February 26, 2003
- Genre: Turn-based strategy
- Modes: Single-player, multiplayer

Heroes of Might and Magic IV is a turn-based strategy game developed by Gus Smedstad through New World Computing and published by the 3DO Company for Microsoft Windows-based personal computers in 2002. A Macintosh port was subsequently developed by Contraband Entertainment and released by the 3DO Company. The fourth installment of the popular Heroes of Might and Magic franchise, it is the sequel to Heroes of Might and Magic III, and was the last to be developed by New World Computing.

== Gameplay ==
Heroes of Might and Magic IV introduced a number of major changes to the series. There are six town types, and this time each has an ideological alignment: Life (Haven), Nature (Preserve), Chaos (Asylum), Death (Necropolis), Order (Academy), and Might (Stronghold). Apart from Might, which is neutral, each alignment is friendly to two others and antagonistic to two others.

=== Heroes ===
Unlike previous games, where they had little active role in combat, heroes became present on the battlefield with their troops. They can attack, and be attacked. If a hero is killed in combat he/she must be brought to a friendly town to be revived. It is possible to have armies with more than one hero, or with no heroes at all, although armies without a hero are incapable of performing certain tasks, such as capturing enemy towns or structures.

The skill system also underwent a significant overhaul, and all Heroes of a given class start out with the same skills. The player has significantly more control over the development of the Hero than in previous games in the series, and Heroes "evolve" into over 40 different specialized classes. A Hero can select up to five of the nine available primary skills, and each primary skill makes available three secondary skills. Each of these 36 skills have five levels of progression as opposed to the three levels in the previous games.

Heroes are now free to move about the battlefield.

=== Combat ===
Both the adventure and combat maps were converted to a fixed-view isometric 3D display. The traditional hexagon-based battle grid was converted into a much higher-resolution square-based grid, making it easier to feature units of different sizes. Non-hero spellcasting units were given proper spell selections. Retaliation was allowed simultaneously with the attack, and ranged units were given the capability to retaliate against ranged attacks. Projectile attacks and spells now required direct line of sight to the target.

=== World map ===
Each individual troop unit was given its own movement allowance on the adventure map, with units possessing the ability to split off independently of the main army; however, the troops can no longer be "shuttled" from hero to hero to move an army large distances in a single turn. Logistics were restricted by eliminating or weakening travel spells. This, in turn, was partially compensated for by the elimination of the need to revisit resource-producing structures each week, and the introduction of caravans, which can quickly and safely transport heroes and remotely recruit troops from external dwellings.

=== Units ===
A small number of these skills are shared with earlier games, and some of the new skills can dramatically affect strategy (e.g., a Hero with Grandmaster Stealth is invisible to all non-allied units). Troop units may no longer be upgraded, and there are four recruitable ranks of unit in towns, down from seven. Each rank has two dwellings that can be built, but beyond the first rank, building one dwelling precludes the other. The creature dwellings themselves accumulate new creatures every day, as opposed to the start of each new week. Unlike previous games, even unit types that can only be found on the adventure map and not in towns are all still associated with one of the six faction alignments.

== Story ==
The status display screen for a hero.

Following the events of Heroes Chronicles: The Sword of Frost, Gelu, the leader of Erathia's Forest Guard and wielder of Armageddon's Blade, attacks Kilgor, the Barbarian King of Krewlod, in an attempt to claim and destroy the Sword of Frost. As foretold by a prophecy, when Armageddon's Blade and the Sword of Frost clash in battle, the result is a massive explosion known as the Reckoning, which destroys the world of Enroth. Many of the inhabitants of the planet, however, escape through mysterious portals that appear during the Reckoning leading to another world, called Axeoth – also the setting for Might and Magic IX. Included among the refugees are many of the heroes of previous installments of the series, and many return to their old ways shortly after arriving on their new home.

The story of Heroes of Might and Magic IV unfolds primarily through the game's six campaigns, each of which establishes how the major kingdoms of one of Axeoth's continents were forged in the wake of the Reckoning, and the arrival of the Enrothian refugees on Axeoth. Each of the campaigns centers on a faction leader, and tells the story of how that leader came to prominence. Unlike Heroes of Might and Magic III, all of the six campaigns are accessible from the beginning, and each unfolds as a stand-alone tale.

- In the Haven campaign, The True Blade, Lysander, a loyal knight formerly in the service of Queen Catherine Ironfist, rules over the nascent kingdom of Palaedra, inhabited mainly by refugees from the kingdom of Erathia. His command, however, is challenged by a usurper named Sir Worton, who claims to be the only surviving heir to the Gryphonheart dynasty. Many of Lysander's generals are drawn to Worton, forcing the lord to expose Worton as a fraud or lose control of his kingdom.
- At the start of the Stronghold campaign, Glory of Days Past, Waerjak, a barbarian chieftain, despairs over the changes that have come over the barbarian community. In the wake of Kilgor's death, his people have descended into interfactional strife, and are in danger of wiping themselves out. Intent on restoring the barbarian kingdom to its more peaceful state before Kilgor's ascension, Waerjak sets out to prove his strength and to subdue his rivals, guided by his mentor, Tarnum (previously the protagonist of the Heroes Chronicles series).

A snowy necropolis (death-aligned town).

- The game's Academy campaign, The Price of Peace tells the story of Emilia Nighthaven, the peasant daughter of an Enrothian glassblower. On Axeoth, however, she finds herself taking command of a community of frightened refugees and forging them into the kingdom of Great Arcan. Queen Emilia's success, however, attracts the attention of Gavin Magnus, the Immortal King of Bracada from Heroes of Might and Magic III and Might and Magic VII, and his genie servant, Solmyr, who seek to prevent Axeoth from meeting the same fate as Enroth by magically depriving its entire population of their free will.
- In the Preserve campaign, Elwin and Shaera, Elwin, a simple elf from the Elven kingdom of Aranorn (mainly populated by survivors from AvLee), is in love with Shaera, but their romance is threatened by Lord Harke, a powerful rival for Shaera's affection. Elwin's continued pursuit of his beloved plunges the region into internecine war, and whoever emerges the victor will not only win Shaera's hand in marriage, but the throne of Aranorn, as well.
- Half-Dead, the Necropolis campaign, relates the tale of Gauldoth Half-Dead, the half-human, half-lich victim of a necromantic spell that he cast to save his life which went horribly wrong. Tired of living on the scraps of food he can steal from fearful villagers, Gauldoth unites the forces of the surviving Necromancers and demonic Kreegans from Enroth's old kingdoms of Deyja and Eeofol into Nekross, a powerful and feared kingdom, but he is forced to act as a protector for both the living and the dead when a powerful being from another dimension arrives with plans to end all life in the universe.
- A Pirate's Daughter, the game's Asylum campaign, introduces the only daughter of a famous pirate, Tawni Balfour. Tawni inherits her father's ship and crew following his unfortunate death. Sailing down the coasts of the Gold Sea, fighting feared buccaneers, sea monsters and mermaids alike, Tawni intends to claim her father's mantle as Axeoth's most feared pirate captain, all while having to face her own shady past.

== Expansion packs ==
Two expansion packs were released for Heroes IV: Heroes of Might and Magic IV: The Gathering Storm (2002) and Heroes of Might and Magic IV: Winds of War (2003), both for Microsoft Windows only.

The Gathering Storm offers six campaigns, more than 20 maps, 16 additional artifacts, four new creatures, and a multiplayer update. Each of the first five campaigns features a new specialty hero. The Gathering Storm also features an upgraded editor, which allows full access to new heroes, adventure objects, artifacts and creatures. A new soundtrack is also included.

Winds of War introduces three new creatures and six new campaigns, which collectively tell the story of the invasion of the kingdom of Channon by the leaders of its five neighboring kingdoms. Winds of War was the last installment of the entire Heroes of Might and Magic series to be developed by New World Computing. Afterwards, the bankruptcy of the 3DO Company led to the sale of the Might and Magic franchise to Ubisoft for $1.3 million.

== Reception ==
=== Heroes of Might and Magic IV ===
==== Critical reviews ====
Heroes of Might and Magic IV

Aggregate score
Aggregator	Score	
Aggregator	Macintosh	PC
Metacritic	N/A	84/100

Review scores
Publication	Score	
Publication	Macintosh	PC
AllGame	N/A	4.5/5
Computer Gaming World	N/A	2.5/5
EP Daily	N/A	8/10
Eurogamer	N/A	6/10
Game Informer	N/A	8.75/10
GameRevolution	N/A	A−
GameSpot	N/A	8.8/10
GameSpy	N/A	4/5
GameZone	N/A	8.5/10
IGN	9/10	8.7/10
Macworld	3/5	N/A
PC Gamer (US)	N/A	76%

The original Heroes IV received "favorable" reviews according to the review aggregation website Metacritic. GameSpot wrote that "Heroes IV is clearly a worthy successor to the series and has very clearly been worth the wait", praising New World Computing for being "able to incorporate so many new and interesting features into this sequel while still making sure it kept all the core elements that made all the previous games so great."

==== Sales ====
In the German market, the game debuted at #5 on Media Control's computer game sales chart for April 2002. It climbed to fourth in its second month, before dropping to 12th and 19th in June and July, respectively.

==== Awards ====
The game was a nominee for The Electric Playground's 2002 "Best Strategy Game for PC" award, but lost to Warcraft III: Reign of Chaos.

=== The Gathering Storm ===
Heroes of Might and Magic IV: The Gathering Storm

Aggregate score
Aggregator	Score
Metacritic	64/100

Review scores
Publication	Score
Computer Games Magazine	2.5/5
Computer Gaming World	1.5/5
GameSpot	7/10
GameSpy	4/5
GameZone	8/10
IGN	7.7/10

The Gathering Storm received "mixed" reviews, more so than the original Heroes IV, according to Metacritic.

=== Winds of War ===
Heroes of Might and Magic IV: Winds of War

Aggregate score
Aggregator	Score
Metacritic	58/100

Review scores
Publication	Score
Computer Games Magazine	2.5/5
Computer Gaming World	1.5/5
GameRevolution	C−
GameSpot	6.7/10
GameSpy	1/5
GameZone	7.5/10
IGN	6.9/10
X-Play	2/5

Winds of War received more mixed reviews than The Gathering Storm and the original according to Metacritic.
