= Might and Magic VI: The Mandate of Heaven =

1998 video game

- Cover art by Larry Elmore
- Developer: New World Computing
- Publisher: The 3DO Company
- Designers: Bryan Farina; Paul Rattner; Jon Van Caneghem
- Artist: Julia Ulano
- Composers: Paul Romero; Rob King; Steve Baca
- Series: Might and Magic
- Platform: Microsoft Windows
- Release: April 30, 1998
- Genre: Role-playing video game
- Mode: Single player

Might and Magic VI: The Mandate of Heaven, commonly abbreviated to Might and Magic VI or simply MM6, is a role-playing video game developed by New World Computing and published by 3DO in 1998. It is the sixth installment in the Might and Magic series, the sequel to Might and Magic V: Darkside of Xeen and the first of the Might and Magic titles to take place on the same planet as Heroes of Might and Magic. It continues the storyline of Heroes of Might and Magic II, and takes place at the same time as Heroes of Might and Magic III in the series chronology. The game was compared favorably to its peers, role-playing video games such as The Elder Scrolls II: Daggerfall. Critics praised it for its non-linear, user-friendly premise, an interactive, detailed game world and a polished, bug-free initial release. A Limited Edition version of the game was also released, including a cloth map of Enroth, a strategy guide and the first five games of the series on CD-ROM. It was followed by three sequels, with Might and Magic VII: For Blood and Honor directly continuing the story arc.

== Gameplay ==
In Might and Magic VI, the player takes control of four adventurers, each starting with low attributes, guiding them to be mighty heroes to save the fictional land of Enroth. Unlike the previous titles, The Mandate of Heaven moved away from grid-based maps and granted players fully explorable maps to roam over, including scalable mountains. Battles can be conducted either in real time or in a turn-based mode, allowing players to take time determining what enemies to attack or what spells to cast, although turn-based mode severely limits the player's movement. As in the rest of the series, all action is shown through the eyes of the party, in first person view, but the new engine allows full 360 degree turning as well as looking up and down. For gameplay and storyline reasons, along with the fact that it is based on a new platform, Might and Magic VI includes no character transfer system between its prequels or sequels, unlike earlier installments.

Apart from the main quest line, there are a number of side and promotion quests available to take on, but although they are not abundant, most are detailed in their setup and planning. Because the game operates under a calendar schedule with a day and night system, the time of year affects the availability of several scheduled events, such as the Solstices and the presence of the Circus of the Sun.

=== Character creation and improvement ===
Uniquely for the series, Might and Magic VI is the first and only Might and Magic title to offer players no choice regarding race: all playable characters are human. Also, unlike previous versions of the Might and Magic series, the party size is limited to four characters (with two slots for NPCs), compared to the six character party sizes in previous games. Players then choose one of six classes that are available in the game for use: Knight, Druid, Paladin, Cleric, Sorcerer and Archer. The class chosen for a character determines what skills they can use in the game including which two are preset for them (e.g. Archers begin with Bow from the start), and how their two primary stats (Health and Magic Points) are set up. Players can modify a character further in creation by selecting two more skills to complement their class, along with improving their ability score by adding or subtracting points from one of seven statistics, all of which are carried over from the previous instalments: Might, Intellect, Personality, Endurance, Accuracy, Speed and Luck. Characters age as game time passes (as well as through detrimental spells and potions), and so begin at roughly twenty years old, receiving statistic penalties upon going beyond fifty years of age.

A screenshot of gameplay depicting overland exploration.

Characters can be improved after party creation in a number of ways. By fighting enemies, completing quests, and through other means, each character can earn experience towards advancing to a new level, although doing so requires the use of a training centre in a settlement in order to earn increases to health and magic points. Improving their other statistics, including resistances to magic, can be done by finding and using various items in the game world – barrels, cauldrons, shrines, wells and fountains – along with drinking certain potions. Characters can further improve themselves by taking on promotion quests for their class, which provide greater benefits as a result of increasing to a higher tier along with a change in title (e.g. Paladins that are promoted, become Crusaders). Characters can only receive two promotions for their class and must earn their first promotion before attempting to work on earning their second promotion, while characters not of the same class receive just an honorary promotion; classes not used can still have their promotion quests undertaken during a playthrough.

=== Skill point system ===
The game's skill point system affords the player an uncommon degree of liberty in further character improvement. More skills can be acquired for a character after party creation through various guilds across Enroth, but what can be learned depends on their class. While many adventuring skills, such as Repair and Merchant, are fully available to all classes, most weapon, armour and magic skills are restricted to certain character classes (i.e. Sorcerers can't use swords or plate armour), although advancement in learned skills is not restricted by class: an archer, for example, can become just as skilled at using a sword as a knight can.

Each skill consists of two factors to it – Rank and Expertise, of which the latter is divided into three levels: Normal, Expert and Master. While a skill's Rank can be improved (up to a maximum of 60) by spending points earned from advancing a character in level or using special items, the amount needed to reach a new rank increases over time – a skill of Rank 2 would need 2 points to advance, but then need 3 points to advance past its new rank, then 4 points, and so forth. To improve a skill's Expertise, characters must find and gain training from a teacher of the respective skill. While there are a number of teachers available who can raise a skill to Expert and have basic pre-requisite for their training (money and a certain skill Rank), each skill has only one Master teacher; their location is known by Expert teachers, yet their pre-requisites are greater, with some requiring a character to have a stat at a certain amount, and even having gotten a class promotion. By achieving a higher level of expertise, a character can gain bonuses to complement it, such as being able to maintaining a spell's beneficial effect for much longer. Thus, a Knight who is level 20 could achieve a better expertise of Sword skill and thus become more powerful in later battles.

While the skill system in The Mandate of Heaven was relaxed, in later sequels it was made considerably more restrictive in terms of expertise; although a new level was added in, a character's class restricted how high it went.

== Plot ==
With the problem of the corrupt Guardian, Sheltem, finally dealt with in Might and Magic V: Darkside of Xeen, the 1500-year war between the Ancients and a devil-like race of alien beings, the Kreegans, spills over onto nearby planets. One of these is the world of Enroth, on which a continent-nation of the same name lies. Seven years after the events of Heroes of Might and Magic II: The Succession Wars, on a day later to be known as the Night of Shooting Stars, meteor-like spaceships fall from the Void, infested with Kreegans. The king of Enroth, Roland Ironfist, departs north with an army seeking to attack the devil-like creatures, but he is betrayed by a traitorous air mage named Sulman. Roland's forces are ambushed by an enormous Kreegan army, and he, his court wizard Tanir, and the noble Sir Ragnar are captured, while the rest of the Enrothian forces are devastated. The Kreegan king Xenofex secretly establishes the Temple of Baa, a doomsday cult dedicated to removing the Ironfist dynasty from power. With their king missing, his wife Queen Catherine having recently sailed to her homeland of Erathia to attend her father's funeral (as depicted in Heroes of Might and Magic III), and their young son, Prince Nicolai, left to rule the kingdom alongside Regent Wilbur Humphrey, the people of Enroth begin to fear that the Ironfists have lost the "Mandate of Heaven" (the divine right to rule).

Might and Magic VI was the first game in the series to use three-dimensional full motion video at key points to advance the storyline.

The four player characters are from the town of Sweet Water, which is attacked and overwhelmed by the Kreegan invaders. Falagar, a powerful warlock, intervenes and teleports them to safety, where he trains them until they are ready to make their own path in the world. They discover Sulman's corpse in an abandoned goblin camp with a letter addressed to him from Xenofex, and present it to Regent Humphrey in Castle Ironfist. Humphrey rewards them and asks their help in seeking out King Roland. Before battling the Kreegans, they require the guidance of the Oracle of Enroth in the city of Free Haven, access to which is controlled by the Enrothian High Council. The Council in Free Haven is made up of six delegates representing nobles who govern regions of Enroth, each of which will only vote in favor of letting the party see the Oracle once they perform a quest for that delegate's lord or lady; all of them need to give their blessings in order for the party to proceed. However, Nicolai escapes from Castle Ironfist to follow the party but runs off to join the Circus of the Sun, a troupe of travelling entertainers led by Circus Master Blaze (who happens to be a red dragon) that moves between three areas on the world map depending on the time of year. The prince must be found before Castle Ironfist opens its gates again.

Even with Humphrey's blessing, Slicker Silvertongue, his delegate, persists in refusing the party entry to the Oracle. Humphrey suggests his mind is addled and instructs the party to try to heal him with an antidote, but when cornered, the in-fact willing traitor Silvertongue reveals himself as the High Priest of Baa and disappears, cursing the Ironfists. The remaining delegates grant the heroes entry to the Oracle, who is actually a sapient computer named Melian, created by the Ancients. Melian, damaged by Roland's usurper brother Archibald Ironfist during the Succession Wars for refusing to help him, instructs the heroes to recover its four memory crystals from the dangerous locations they have all been taken to following Archibald's theft. The party recovers two crystals from Castles Darkmoor and Alamos. In Castle Kriegspire, they obtain the third crystal, along with Roland's journal, which explains that Sir Ragnar died from his wounds while the Kreegans transported Roland and Tanir elsewhere to be ransomed or tortured, as confirmed in Heroes of Might and Magic III.

Attacking the worshippers of Baa in their main temple on Hermit's Isle, the heroes obtain the last crystal, killing the traitorous Silvertongue in the process. Restored, Melian explains to them the backstory of the Ancient-Kreegan war, and once they retrieve a Control Cube from the Tomb of VARN pyramid in Dragonsand, permits them to retrieve anti-Kreegan blasters from the Planetary Control Center, where they face security bots. Melian also tells the heroes that before they can destroy the Kreegan, they require a spell capable of preventing the explosion of their ship from also destroying the planet and only Roland's evil brother Archibald knows of one. However, the powerful necromancer was petrified after his defeat in Heroes II. Prince Nicolai agrees to release Archibald from his stone curse with Tanir's bell, and Archibald gratefully hands them the Ritual of the Void before teleporting away.

Finally, the player characters return to their ruined hometown of Sweet Water and attack The Hive, the largest of the meteorite-like spaceships the Kreegans arrived in. Killing the immense Kreegan Queen, they destroy The Hive's reactor core and conjure the Ritual of the Void to contain the explosion, eliminating The Hive and the Kreegans on the continent while sparing the land from the reactor's wave of destruction. The epilogue shows the heroes knighted and congratulated by Nicolai and Humphrey in a ceremony at Castle Ironfist, with Archibald viewing the scene from afar through a crystal ball, sardonically thanking them for saving his kingdom for him, setting up for the events of Might and Magic VII.

== Development ==
Development of Might and Magic VI began in 1996, following the success of Might and Magic V: Darkside of Xeen and the first two Heroes of Might and Magic games, despite New World Computing's previous statements that there would not be another installment in the series. A teaser trailer, consisting of a montage of screenshots, was included as a secret extra in Heroes of Might and Magic II. During early pre-production, New World Computing recruited science fantasy author Geary Gravel to write a trilogy of novels based on the game's tentative storyline and setting. An early plan was to include a copy of the first book with select copies of the game. As little information surfaced over time, Gravel was instructed to write the books and develop the setting first, with the developers basing their storyline on the novels instead. Del Rey Books published two of the three novels, The Dreamwright and The Shadowsmith, before the release of Might and Magic VI. However, it was decided to develop Might and Magic VI's storyline independently of the novels, setting the game on Enroth, the world in which Heroes of Might and Magic took place. Gravel was offered to write a new novel set on Enroth instead of completing the trilogy, but declined.

The change of setting established a formal connection between the two series, and successive Might and Magic games continued the Heroes storyline, though with overt connections to the original series such as many references to the Ancients and the presence of a town named New Sorpigal, in reference to the first game's starting town. These were built upon in Might and Magic VII and VIII, which featured several characters from the first five games. The story is set ten years after Heroes of Might and Magic II, and occurs in tandem with the events of Heroes of Might and Magic III: The Restoration of Erathia. The game was first announced with a press release at E3 of April 1998, described by series creator Jon Van Caneghem, who led development, as "the best Might and Magic that I have ever made" and "by far the largest and most ambitious game in the history of role playing games" with more than a thousand miles of virtual terrain. An architect was reportedly involved with designing the gameworld's structures and dungeons, and two graphic engines named Horizon and Labyrinth were used in the creation of the game's environments. In Might and Magic VI larger objects like buildings, dungeons and the landscape are in 3D. Smaller objects like trees, humans and creatures are 2-dimensional sprites. The sprites were pre-rendered 3D images in 3DS Max and Character Studio. It was the first in the series to feature full motion video cinematics. The game's soundtrack was composed by Steve Baca, Rob King, Paul Romero and Jennifer Wang – Baca, King and Romero had previously composed music for Heroes of Might and Magic.

Complex design elements such as the inclusion of rival adventuring parties and a quest system involving complicated alliances with nobles and other factions were announced, but did not make appearances in the final game.

== Reception ==
Reception

Aggregate score
Aggregator	Score
GameRankings	85%

Review scores
Publication	Score
AllGame	4.5 out of 5
CNET Gamecenter	8 out of 10
Computer Games Strategy Plus	4.5 out of 5
Computer Gaming World	4.5 out of 5
EP Daily	7.5 out of 10
Game Informer	7.75 out of 10
GameRevolution	B+
GameSpot	9.1 out of 10
IGN	9 out of 10
Next Generation	4 out of 5
PC Gamer (US)	90%
RPGFan	90%

The game received favorable reviews according to the review aggregation website GameRankings. GameSpot called it "a standout game in what should be a great year for role-playing game fans", as well as saying "the graphics in Might and Magic VI are the best yet seen in a 3D first-person-perspective role-playing game." IGN said, "any fan of role-playing games should already own this game... [it] satisfies on a level that no RPG has in years. Highly recommended for almost everyone." RPGFan cited the gameplay as a particular strength. "When all is said and done, the sheer fun of exploration and character development is more than enough to keep playing Might and Magic VI. It can get tedious at times, and the gameplay and graphics have a few limitations. That alone is not enough to drag the game down, and in the end, the end result is more than the sum of its parts. Choose to enter the land of Enroth, and you'll find yourself playing for well over 100 hours."

In 1998, PC Gamer declared it the 32nd-best computer game ever released, and its staff called it "a must-have for any roleplaying fan's collection".

=== Awards ===
The game received nominations for the Academy of Interactive Arts & Sciences' "PC Role Playing Game of the Year" award at the 2nd Annual Interactive Achievement Awards, "Best RPG" award at Computer Gaming World's 1999 Premier Awards, the "Best Roleplaying Game" at the Fifth Annual PC Gamer Awards, "Role-playing Game of the Year" award at GameSpot's Best and Worst of 1998 Awards, "Best RPG of the Year" award at IGNPC's Best of 1998 Awards, and "RPG of the Year Award" at Computer Games Strategy Plus' Best of 1998 Awards; however, it was all ultimately awarded to Baldur's Gate. The staff of PC Gamer wrote that Might and Magic VI "takes all of the elements that made its predecessors some of the most popular RPGs in gaming history and, amazingly, improves on them." The staff of CGW called Might and Magic VI "a gigantic, addictive hack-'n'-slash—and not much in the depth department. Still, for 80 hours or so, it was a definite hoot to play."
