= Nuclear War (video game) =

1989 video game

- Developer(s): New World Computing
- Publisher(s): U.S. Gold
- Designer(s): Eric Hyman; Jon Van Caneghem
- Artist(s): Avril Harrison
- Platform(s): Amiga, MS-DOS
- Release: 1989
- Genre(s): Turn-based strategy
- Mode(s): Single player

Nuclear War is a single player turn-based strategy game developed by New World Computing and released for the Amiga in 1989 and later for MS-DOS. It presents a satirical, cartoonish nuclear battle between five world powers, in which the winner is whoever retains some population when everyone else on earth is dead.

== Gameplay ==
The game's introduction includes an homage to Dr. Strangelove. Each player – one human, four computer-controlled – is represented by a caricature of a national leader (the MS-DOS version allows more than one human player). If there is a computer-controlled winner at the end of the game, that leader is depicted jumping for joy in the middle of a devastated wasteland, crowing "I won! I won!" If the human player wins only the high score board is shown. Once a player (computer or human) loses, all of their stockpiled weapons are automatically launched at the other players. It is possible for a game to have no winner because of this. If this happens, a cut scene of the earth shattering and exploding is shown, and the high score table appears (though without any new entries).

== Characters ==
The following characters are available in the game; the public figure being satirized is listed in parentheses.

- Ronnie Raygun (Ronald Reagan)
- P.M. Satcher (Margaret Thatcher)
- Infidel Castro (Fidel Castro)
- Col. Malomar Khadaffy (Muammar al-Gaddafi)
- Ayatollah Kookamamie (Ruhollah Khomeini)
- Mao the Pun (Mao Zedong)
- Jimi Farmer (Jimmy Carter)
- Tricky Dick (Richard Nixon)
- Mikhail Gorabachef (Mikhail Gorbachev)
- Ghanji (Mahatma Gandhi)

== Reception ==
In the July 1990 edition of Games International (Issue 16), Brian Walker didn't think this was a particularly challenging game, commenting, "All good clean fun with nothing to stretch the brain cells." He concluded by giving the game a rating of 7 out of 10 for gameplay and 8 out of 10 for graphics, saying, "What lifts the game above average is the omnipresent humour."

In the July 1990 edition of Dragon (Issue #159), Hartley, Patricia, and Kirk Lesser characterized the game as "challenging", despite its tongue in cheek humour. However, they were disappointed that only one player could play the game at a time. Nevertheless, they gave the game an above-average rating of 4 1/2 out of 5.

In the October 1990 edition of Computer Gaming World, Chuck Moss favorably reviewed the game's graphics, fast and brief game play, and humorous computer opponents.

Surveys of opinions about wargames with modern settings conducted for Computer Gaming World in 1992 and 1994 awarded the game a rating of 3 1/2 out of 5.

== See also ==
- Balance of Power
- DEFCON
