= Empire II: The Art of War =

1995 video game

- Developer: White Wolf Productions
- Publisher: New World Computing
- Producer: Deane Rettig
- Designers: Mark Lewis Baldwin; Bob Rakosky
- Composer: Rob Wallace
- Platforms: DOS, Windows
- Release: 1995
- Genres: Turn-based strategy, wargame
- Modes: Single-player, multiplayer

Empire II: The Art of War is a turn-based strategy wargame developed by American studio White Wolf Productions and published by New World Computing for the PC.

== Gameplay ==
Empire II: The Art of War is built around a customizable game and ruleset editor, allowing single battle scenarios to be created and played in eras from the Neolithic to the Space Age. It comes with a number of preset scenarios, including the Battle of Arbela (331 BC), the Battle of Lepanto (1571), the Battle of Blenheim (1704), and the American Civil War battles of Antietam and Shiloh (1862).

== Reception ==
Reception

Review scores
Publication	Score
Next Generation	2/5
PC Gamer (US)	63%
Computer Game Review	84/89/85

PC Gamer reviewed the game, giving it a 63/100, and argued that it is "the most powerful, flexible, wargame construction set ever published", but ultimately criticized how complex and badly documented it was, calling the game "one of the biggest disappointments in years". Next Generation gave the PC version two stars out of five, and compared it unfavorably with the original game, ultimately calling it "a disappointment". Computer Game Review dubbed the game a "solid job on a project of this magnitude".

== Reviews ==
- Level #31 (in Czech)
- Computer Gaming World (December 1995)
- PC Player (November 1995)
- Australian Realms #28
