= Heroes of Might and Magic IV (card game) =

Collectible card game

Heroes of Might & Magic IV Collectible Card and Tile Game is a 2005 collectible card game created by DG Associates and designed by Jonathan Bjork.

== Game pieces ==
The game is played on maps created at the start of the game from map tiles (world of Axeoth). As the places on the tiles are too small to place the actual cards on, the locations of armies, objects, and towns are represented on the map as numbered and colored army, location, and town markers, respectively. Each marker to place on the map has an equivalent marker to place on the cards that the first represents. One is a color on white, the other is white on a color.

=== Map tiles ===
Map tiles use hexagon shapes with pictures to show the environment. They also add special extras to certain factions according to the advanced rules.

=== Cards ===
There are a variety of types of durable cards used throughout gameplay. They include creatures, spells, artifacts, towns, locations, and heroes.

=== Markers ===
Positions of cards on the map are represented by markers. Many reviews held the clumsiness of analyzing positions using markers as their only criticism of the game.

== Gameplay ==
=== Setting up ===
Each player searches through their deck for a starting army of 3 Level 1 creatures, 2 Level 2 creatures, and 1 Level 3 creature, as well as a hero, and a town to place on the side. All cards must be of the same alignment.

A random map tile is placed face up. Players then take turns selecting face-down map tiles and connecting them to the previous ones as they please.

Finally, players draw a hand, placing all but three of their hand face down into the "Adventure Stack," a pile from which cards can be played from, but not used as money from.

Up to six players can participate in this game.
