= Arcomage =

- Developer: New World Computing
- Publisher: The 3DO Company
- Series: Might and Magic
- Platform: Microsoft Windows
- Release: 1999 (M&M VII); 2000 (M&M VIII); 2000 (stand-alone)
- Genre: Card game
- Modes: Single-player, Multiplayer

Arcomage is a computerized card game produced by The 3DO Company. It originated as a minigame in Might and Magic VII: For Blood and Honor and Might and Magic VIII: Day of the Destroyer, in which it was used to gamble for in-game money or to complete a quest to win games in every tavern. 3DO later released it as a stand-alone game in 2000. In the stand-alone version a single player can play against a computer opponent, or two players can play via a LAN or TCP/IP connection. Arcomage uses the fantasy themes of the game in which it is set.

Arcomage was developed by Stickman Games. The game was sold to 3DO.

== Gameplay ==
Arcomage takes the form of a tabletop game, in which there are two players, each with a deck of cards, a "tower" and a "wall", as well as several other variables that determine whether they win or lose, and what cards they can play. As Might and Magic is a single-player game, one would always play against an AI opponent - making the game relatively easy to win.

Players take it in turns to:

- Draw the appropriate number of cards to complete their 6-part deck (one or more cards would have been played or discarded during their previous turn)
- Either play or discard a card, depending on their options - in some cases discard will be the only option available, as the player might not have the appropriate number of "gems", "bricks" or "recruits".
- If their chosen card allows it, play again and/or choose a card to discard.

Every tavern has its different victory conditions, so players must adapt their styles for different situations. A game could end in one of the following ways:

- A player's tower has been reduced to 0
- A player's tower has achieved a "height" of X (value depends on Tavern)
- A player accumulates X amount of resources (value depends on Tavern)

As well as having a "Tower", "Wall" and Deck of Cards, each player also has:

- "Quarry" - controls how many "bricks" are gained each turn
- "Bricks" - spent on brick cards
- "Magic" - controls how many "gems" are gained each turn
- "Gems" - spent on gem cards
- "Dungeon" - controls how many "recruits" are gained each turn
- "Recruits" - spent on recruit cards

Arcomage employs a wide range of cards, each with their own name, effects and picture. Several cards were added to the original deck in Might and Magic VIII. Examples include:

- Faerie (recruit card): 2 damage (to enemy tower/wall); play Again. Cost: 1 recruit.
- Portcullis (brick card): +5 wall; +1 dungeon. Cost: 9 bricks.
- Sanctuary (gem card): + 10 tower; +5 wall; gain 5 recruits. Cost: 15 gems.

== Reception ==
Reception

Review score
Publication	Score
Computer Gaming World	2/5

Arcomage received mixed reviews upon release. Jeff Green of Computer Gaming World found the game to be "less fun" than its concept due to the "utter randomness of play", also noting the game had little differences from its appearance in Might and Magic VII.
