= New World Computing =

American development studio for computer games

New World Computing, Inc.
- Type: Subsidiary
- Industry: Video games
- Founded: 1984; 42 years ago
- Founders: Jon Van Caneghem; Michaela Van Caneghem; Mark Caldwell
- Defunct: 2003
- Fate: Filed for Chapter 11 bankruptcy
- Headquarters: Agoura Hills, California, U.S.
- Key people: Jon Van Caneghem (president); Mark Caldwell (vice-president, general manager)
- Products: Might and Magic; Heroes of Might and Magic; Planet's Edge; King's Bounty
- Parent: NTN Communications (1994–1996); The 3DO Company (1996–2003)

New World Computing, Inc. was an American video game developer and publisher founded in 1984 by Jon Van Caneghem, his wife, Michaela Van Caneghem, and Mark Caldwell. It was best known for its work on the Might and Magic role-playing video game series and its spin-offs, especially Heroes of Might and Magic. The company was purchased by and became a division of The 3DO Company on July 10, 1996 from NTN Communications, after NTN purchased New World Computing for $10 million in stock.

Amidst financial hardship, the 3DO Company laid off a large portion of the staff of New World Computing on April 15, 2002. While a smaller, core staff remained at New World Computing, the following year saw little improvement in parent 3DO's situation, and the company filed for Chapter 11 bankruptcy protection in May of that year. Before dissolving later that year, 3DO sold the rights to the Might and Magic series to Ubisoft. As an in-house development studio of the 3DO Company, New World Computing ceased to exist with the dissolution of its parent organization.

== Might and Magic ==
The first Might and Magic game, Might and Magic Book One: The Secret of the Inner Sanctum, was programmed by Jon Van Caneghem for over a three-year period ending in 1986. Released for the Apple II on June 1, 1986, with ports for the Commodore 64, classic Mac OS, and MS-DOS following a year later, the game was successful enough to warrant a sequel, Might and Magic II: Gates to Another World, released for the Apple II and MS-DOS in 1988.

The third installment, Might and Magic III: Isles of Terra was released in 1991 and was the first game in the series designed specifically for MS-DOS-based computers, although ports were released for a variety of other systems, including the classic Mac OS, Super Nintendo Entertainment System, and the Sega Mega Drive. Might and Magic III featured an entirely redesigned game engine and 8-bit (256) color VGA graphics.

The Might and Magic III engine was reused for the next two installments of the series, Might and Magic IV: Clouds of Xeen and Might and Magic V: Darkside of Xeen, released in 1992 and 1993, respectively. When installed together, the two games became a single, omnibus-style title called World of Xeen. In 1994, New World released an enhanced CD-ROM version of World of Xeen featuring Red Book CD audio and spoken dialog. The Might and Magic III engine was used one final time for Swords of Xeen, a continuation of World of Xeen produced by Catware under permission from New World Computing. Although it was never released as a standalone title, Swords of Xeen was included in numerous Might and Magic series compilations released by New World Computing and, later, the 3DO Company.

After a pause of five years (during which time the Heroes of Might and Magic spin-off franchise was launched) New World returned to the Might and Magic series with Might and Magic VI: The Mandate of Heaven, its first game to use 3D graphics, and the first to be released for Microsoft Windows. Might and Magic VII: For Blood and Honor (1999) and Might and Magic VIII: Day of the Destroyer (2000) followed, using the same engine, but adding support for graphical hardware acceleration. In late 2001, Might and Magic VIII was released for the PlayStation 2 video game console in the Japanese market only, courtesy of developer Imagineer.

Also in 2001, New World and 3DO released Legends of Might and Magic, a spin-off of the Might and Magic series. Originally conceived as an online multiplayer action role-playing game (and announced as such when it was unveiled at E3 in 2000), by the time of the game's release the following year it had evolved into a more traditional first-person shooter.

The next Might and Magic game was released in 2002 as Might and Magic IX for Windows. Abandoning the now-dated Might and Magic VI engine in favor of the LithTech engine (also used in Legends of Might and Magic), Might and Magic IX was the first game in the series to be rendered entirely in 3D. Unfortunately, the release of the game was rushed, and the finished product was received poorly by critics, who noted the numerous software bugs remaining in the final release, most of which were not fully resolved by the sole patch released before New World Computing's dissolution. The most current game, released by Ubisoft in 2014, is Might and Magic X.

Before its bankruptcy, the 3DO Company produced two further spin-offs of the Might and Magic series: Crusaders of Might and Magic and Warriors of Might and Magic. Neither of these games was developed by New World Computing, however. Similarly, a number of Might and Magic spin-off titles have been produced since the dissolution of New World Computing by Ubisoft and its associates. New World Computing was not involved in the production of any of these (including Dark Messiah of Might and Magic).

=== Heroes of Might and Magic ===
In 1990, New World Computing released King's Bounty, a turn-based tactical role-playing game, for the Apple II, MS-DOS, Mac, Commodore 64, and Amiga. The game, designed by New World co-founder Jon Van Caneghem, was subsequently modified to include real-time elements and ported to the Sega Mega Drive video game console. Four years later, New World would revisit the basic mechanics of the home-computer versions of King's Bounty with Heroes of Might and Magic: A Strategic Quest, released for MS-DOS. In 1996, an enhanced version of the game was released for Windows 95.

Following the success of the first Heroes game, New World released Heroes of Might and Magic II for Windows 95 and the classic Mac OS. An expansion pack, entitled The Price of Loyalty, was designed by Cyberlore Studios and released by New World Computing in 1997 for Windows 95 only. The combined game and its expansion were subsequently re-released together as Heroes of Might and Magic II Gold.

In 1999, Heroes of Might and Magic III was released for Windows and the classic Mac OS. The Windows release was quickly followed by the Armageddon's Blade expansion pack later that year and The Shadow of Death expansion pack in early 2000. Neither of the two expansion packs were released separately for Mac OS, although an omnibus release, entitled Heroes of Might and Magic III Complete was released for both Windows and Mac OS shortly thereafter. Loki Software produced a Linux port of the original Heroes III in 2000, but neither of the two expansions were made available.

From 2000 to 2001, New World Computing used a limited version of the Heroes of Might and Magic III game engine in a series of eight episodic titles released under the Heroes Chronicles umbrella. Two of these games (The World Tree and The Fiery Moon) were only available for online download to consumers who purchased other installments of the series.

In 2001, an enhanced remake of the original King's Bounty was released for the PlayStation 2 video game console. The game was marketed as part of the Heroes franchise and released under the title Heroes of Might and Magic: Quest for the Dragon Bone Staff.

Heroes of Might and Magic IV was released for Windows in 2002 alongside Might and Magic IX, and featured a major overhaul of the series' gameplay. Like the previous Heroes game, two expansion packs were released: The Gathering Storm in late 2002, and The Winds of War in 2003. Winds of War was the last title to be developed by New World Computing prior to its dissolution following the bankruptcy of 3DO.

Subsequent games in the Heroes of Might and Magic series were developed by Nival Interactive and released by Ubisoft. In addition, the rights to the King's Bounty name were purchased in 2007 by Russian publisher 1C Company, who released King's Bounty: The Legend the following year (developed by Katauri Interactive).

== Other games ==
Throughout its existence, New World Computing focused primarily on the Might and Magic series and its various spin-offs. Early in its existence, however, the company was involved in the development of several unrelated video games, typically in the role-playing video game genre. The company also served as the publisher for a number of games, including Spaceward Ho!, developed by Delta Tao Software, and Empire Deluxe by Mark Baldwin and Bob Rakowsky. After being absorbed into the 3DO Company, New World Computing devoted its energies solely to game development, and worked exclusively on the Might and Magic franchise thereafter.

In 1989, New World Computing developed the satirical game Nuclear War, based on the Flying Buffalo card game of the same name. Published by U.S. Gold, it was not particularly successful from a financial perspective but notable as a departure from the company's traditional field of role-playing video games.

== Games ==
| Year | Title | Developer | Publisher |
|---|---|---|---|
| 1986 | Might and Magic Book One: The Secret of the Inner Sanctum | Yes | Yes |
| 1988 | Might and Magic II: Gates to Another World | Yes | Yes |
| 1989 | Nuclear War | Yes | No |
| 1990 | King's Bounty | Yes | Yes |
| 1990 | Tunnels & Trolls: Crusaders of Khazan | Yes | Yes |
| 1991 | The Faery Tale Adventure | Porter | No |
| 1991 | Joe and Mac | No | Yes |
| 1991 | Might and Magic III: Isles of Terra | Yes | Yes |
| 1991 | Planet's Edge | Yes | Yes |
| 1992 | Might and Magic IV: Clouds of Xeen | Yes | Yes |
| 1992 | Spaceward Ho! | No | Yes |
| 1993 | Empire Deluxe | No | Yes |
| 1993 | Empire Deluxe Scenarios | No | Yes |
| 1993 | Might and Magic V: Darkside of Xeen | Yes | Yes |
| 1994 | Hammer of the Gods | No | Yes |
| 1994 | Inherit the Earth: Quest for the Orb | No | Yes |
| 1994 | Iron Cross | Yes | Yes |
| 1994 | Might and Magic: World of Xeen (enhanced CD) | Yes | Yes |
| 1994 | Zephyr | Yes | Yes |
| 1995 | Anvil of Dawn | No | Yes |
| 1995 | Heroes of Might and Magic | Yes | Yes |
| 1995 | Mind Games Entertainment Pack for Windows | No | Yes |
| 1995 | Multimedia Celebrity Poker | Yes | Yes |
| 1995 | Swords of Xeen | No | Yes |
| 1995 | Wetlands | No | Yes |
| 1996 | Chaos Overlords | No | Yes |
| 1996 | Empire II: The Art of War | No | Yes |
| 1996 | Heroes of Might and Magic II: The Succession Wars | Yes | Yes |
| 1996 | Spaceward Ho! IV | No | Yes |
| 1996 | Wages of War | No | Yes |
| 1997 | Family Card Games Entertainment Pack for Windows 95 | No | Yes |
| 1997 | Family Game Pack | Yes | Yes |
| 1997 | Heroes of Might and Magic II: The Price of Loyalty | No | Yes |
| 1998 | Might and Magic VI: The Mandate of Heaven | Yes | Yes |
| 1999 | Arcomage | Yes | Yes |
| 1999 | Heroes of Might and Magic III | Yes | Yes |
| 1999 | Heroes of Might and Magic III: Armageddon's Blade | Yes | Yes |
| 1999 | Might and Magic VII: For Blood and Honor | Yes | Yes |
| 1999 | Vegas Games 2000 / Vegas Games: Midnight Madness | Yes | Yes |
| 2000 | Heroes Chronicles: Clash of the Dragons | Yes | Yes |
| 2000 | Heroes Chronicles: Conquest of the Underworld | Yes | Yes |
| 2000 | Heroes Chronicles: Masters of the Elements | Yes | Yes |
| 2000 | Heroes Chronicles: Warlords of the Wastelands | Yes | Yes |
| 2000 | Heroes Chronicles: The World Tree (download only) | Yes | Yes |
| 2000 | Heroes Chronicles: The Fiery Moon (download only) | Yes | Yes |
| 2000 | Heroes of Might and Magic III: The Shadow of Death | Yes | Yes |
| 2000 | Might and Magic VIII: Day of the Destroyer | Yes | Yes |
| 2001 | Heroes Chronicles: The Final Chapters | Yes | Yes |
| 2001 | Heroes of Might and Magic: Quest for the Dragon Bone Staff | Yes | Yes |
| 2001 | Legends of Might and Magic | Yes | Yes |
| 2002 | Heroes of Might and Magic IV | Yes | Yes |
| 2002 | Heroes of Might and Magic IV: The Gathering Storm | Yes | Yes |
| 2002 | Might and Magic IX | Yes | Yes |
| 2003 | Heroes of Might and Magic IV: Winds of War | Yes | Yes |

== Vegas Games ==
- More Vegas Games
