= Heroes of Might and Magic II =

1996 video game

Heroes of Might and Magic II: The Succession Wars
- Developer: New World Computing
- Publisher: The 3DO Company
- Director: Jon Van Caneghem
- Producers: Mark Caldwell; Walter Hochbrueckner
- Designers: Jon Van Caneghem; Phil Steinmeyer
- Programmers: Phil Steinmeyer; Mark Caldwell; Todd Hendrix
- Artists: Julia Ulano; Rebecca Riel; Louis Henderson; Lieu Pham
- Writer: Paul Rattner
- Composers: Paul Romero; Rob King; Steve Baca
- Series: Heroes of Might and Magic
- Platforms: MS-DOS, Windows, Classic Mac OS, RISC OS
- Release: October 1, 1996: MS-DOS, Windows; NA: October 1, 1996; EU: 1996; Mac; NA: April 1997
- Genre: Turn-based strategy
- Modes: Single-player, multiplayer

Heroes of Might and Magic II: The Succession Wars is a turn-based strategy video game developed by Jon Van Caneghem through New World Computing and published in 1996 by the 3DO Company. The game is the second installment of the Heroes of Might and Magic series and is typically credited as the breakout game for the series. Heroes II was voted the sixth-best game for IBM PC compatibles of all time by PC Gamer in May 1997.

An expansion pack, The Price of Loyalty, was released in 1997. Later, 3DO bundled Heroes II, its expansion pack and 30 community maps in one box, releasing it as Heroes of Might and Magic II Gold in 1998.

== Gameplay ==
Heroes of Might and Magic II adventure map

For the most part, Heroes of Might and Magic II is largely a graphical overhaul to the first game. Gameplay in both games is along the 4X genre of strategy games, in that the player builds their kingdom from the ground up, securing resources, stronger armies, better generals, and then uses those assets to find and defeat opponents through capturing their castles and defeating their armies. Aside from the updated look, Heroes II added many new features that would become staples in the Heroes of Might and Magic franchise. Heroes II added the Necromancer and Wizard factions, joining the original four factions (Knight, Barbarian, Sorceress, and Warlock) from the first game. These two new factions also come with an army of creatures and a themed town that ties the faction together, and the six are divided down the middle to have 3 "good" and 3 "evil" factions.

Each hero still retains the 'primary skill' system from Heroes I but now can also learn secondary skills, giving each hero the ability to become more distinctive as they gain experience. Each hero can possess up to eight different secondary skills and once gained, a skill can be developed from Basic to Advanced and Expert levels. For example, the Wisdom skill allows a hero to learn spells of level 3 and higher, while the Logistics skill increases the hero's movement ability over land. In Heroes I, heroes had a single, fixed special ability according to their class. The magic system was overhauled in Heroes II. Heroes I had used a memorization system in which each spell could be cast a certain number of times before being exhausted, where the player had to return to a guild to relearn the spell. Heroes II uses a magic point system that allows the player to apportion spell use as needed, while the varying point cost of different spells maintains balance. Another major feature introduced in Heroes II is the ability to upgrade certain army units, granting them improved statistics and, in some cases, important abilities.

In order to play, players guide around their heroes on the global map and have them fight creatures, other heroes and castles on a instanced per-battle battlefield map. Players have full control over their towns, i.e. what to build in them, what creatures to hire into an army and what to upgrade. Players can only build or upgrade a building in a town once per turn.

Lastly, Heroes II added more scenarios to the game and a proper campaign, where the player chooses the good or evil side and plays a series of scenarios using the three factions of that side. Victories in certain scenarios give the player lasting bonuses that carry over to future scenarios, and the player can choose a starting bonus before each scenario starts based on what strategy they take.

== Plot ==
The canonical ending of Heroes I results in Lord Morglin Ironfist's victory. In the following years, he has successfully unified the continent of Enroth and secured his rule as King. Upon the king's death, his two sons, Archibald and Roland, vie for the crown. Archibald orchestrates a series of events that lead to Roland's exile. Archibald is then declared the new king, while Roland organizes a resistance. Each alignment is represented by one of the game's two campaigns. Archibald's campaign features the three "evil"-aligned town factions (Necromancers, Warlocks and Barbarians), while Roland's campaign features the three "good"-aligned town factions (Knights, Sorceresses and Wizards).

If Archibald is victorious, Roland's rebellion is crushed, and Roland himself is imprisoned in Castle Ironfist, leaving Archibald the uncontested ruler of Enroth. The canonical ending, however, results in Roland's victory, with Archibald being turned to stone by Roland's court wizard, Tanir. This event is referenced later in Might and Magic VI: The Mandate of Heaven, when Archibald is freed of the spell. He goes on to be a significant NPC in Might and Magic VII: For Blood and Honor.

== Development ==
Much of the core programming of Heroes II was carried over from the original Heroes, thus the game actually took less time to develop than the original Heroes.

The soundtrack was produced primarily by Paul Romero.

== Reception ==
Reception

Review scores
Publication	Score
Computer Gaming World	5/5
GameSpot	8.2/10
Next Generation	3/5
MacAddict	"Freakin' Awesome!"
PC Games	B+

In December 1996, PC Gamer reported that Heroes of Might and Magic II was "doing particularly well in retail, with every 3DO retailer reordering the product." Combined sales of the Heroes of Might and Magic series, including Heroes II, surpassed 500,000 copies by October 1997. This number rose to 1.5 million copies by December 1999.

Next Generation reviewed the Macintosh version of the game, rating it three stars out of five, and stated that "as role-playing games are few on the Mac, HM&MII, with its mix of character and Warcraft-like game elements is a welcome addition."

Computer Gaming World called Heroes II a "strategy game that amaze[d] everyone with its surprising, addictive qualities and amazing ease of use" and found that Heroes II was "much better than the original Heroes of Might and Magic." Apart from two gameplay issues - the lack of a wait function, and not being able to control your hero if all of your units are disabled, the reviewer found the game "nearly perfect."

Andy Butcher reviewed Heroes of Might and Magic II for Arcane magazine, rating it a 7 out of 10 overall, and stated that "If you were hoping for something really different then it has to be said that Heroes of Might & Magic 2 may be something of a disappointment. On the other hand, if you enjoyed the original this sequel will prove even more challenging and fun to play, and if you have never encountered Heroes of Might & Magic, there's a real treat in store for you in this game."

The editors of PC Gamer US named Heroes of Might and Magic II 1996's "Best Turn-Based Strategy Game", and called it "clearly a cut above" the rest of its genre that year. The game was nominated for Computer Gaming World's 1996 "Strategy Game of the Year" and Computer Game Entertainment's "Best Strategy Game" prizes, as well as Computer Games Strategy Plus's award for the top turn-based strategy title of 1996, but lost in all of these categories to Civilization II. It was also a finalist for the Computer Game Developers Conference's 1996 "Best Strategy/War Game" Spotlight Award, which ultimately went to Command & Conquer: Red Alert. The editors of Computer Gaming World wrote, "The simplicity of King's Bounty-style tactical combat is the perfect counterpoint to the surprising depth of the strategic game, and unlike Heroes I, the campaign is much more satisfying."

== Legacy ==
Heroes of Might and Magic II was named the 25th-best computer game ever by PC Gamer UK in 1997. In 1998, PC Gamer US declared it the seventh-best computer game ever released, and the editors called it "the most dangerously addictive turn-based strategy game in the history of PC gaming (with the possible exception of Civilization II)." In 2003, Heroes of Might and Magic II was inducted into GameSpot's list of the greatest games of all time. Fheroes2: Resurrection is an open source multiplatform engine recreation. It adds improvements like higher screen resolutions, language translations, and improved artificial intelligence. Version 1.0 was released on December 21, 2022.

=== Expansion ===
The Price of Loyalty was the expansion pack for Heroes II, released in 1997. The expansion added four new campaigns, new artifacts, new scenario maps, new map locations and an improved map editor. The expansion also added a new structure for the Necromancer faction - a shrine that enhanced the heroes' ability to raise the dead (Necromancy Skills).

== Heroes II Gold ==
In addition to combining the base game with its expansion, Heroes of Might and Magic II Gold also included 30 maps created by community members. These map creators were not recognized in the in-game credits, but Greg Fulton later credited these creators in one of his newsletters.
