= Paul Romero =

American musician (born 1965)

Paul Anthony Romero
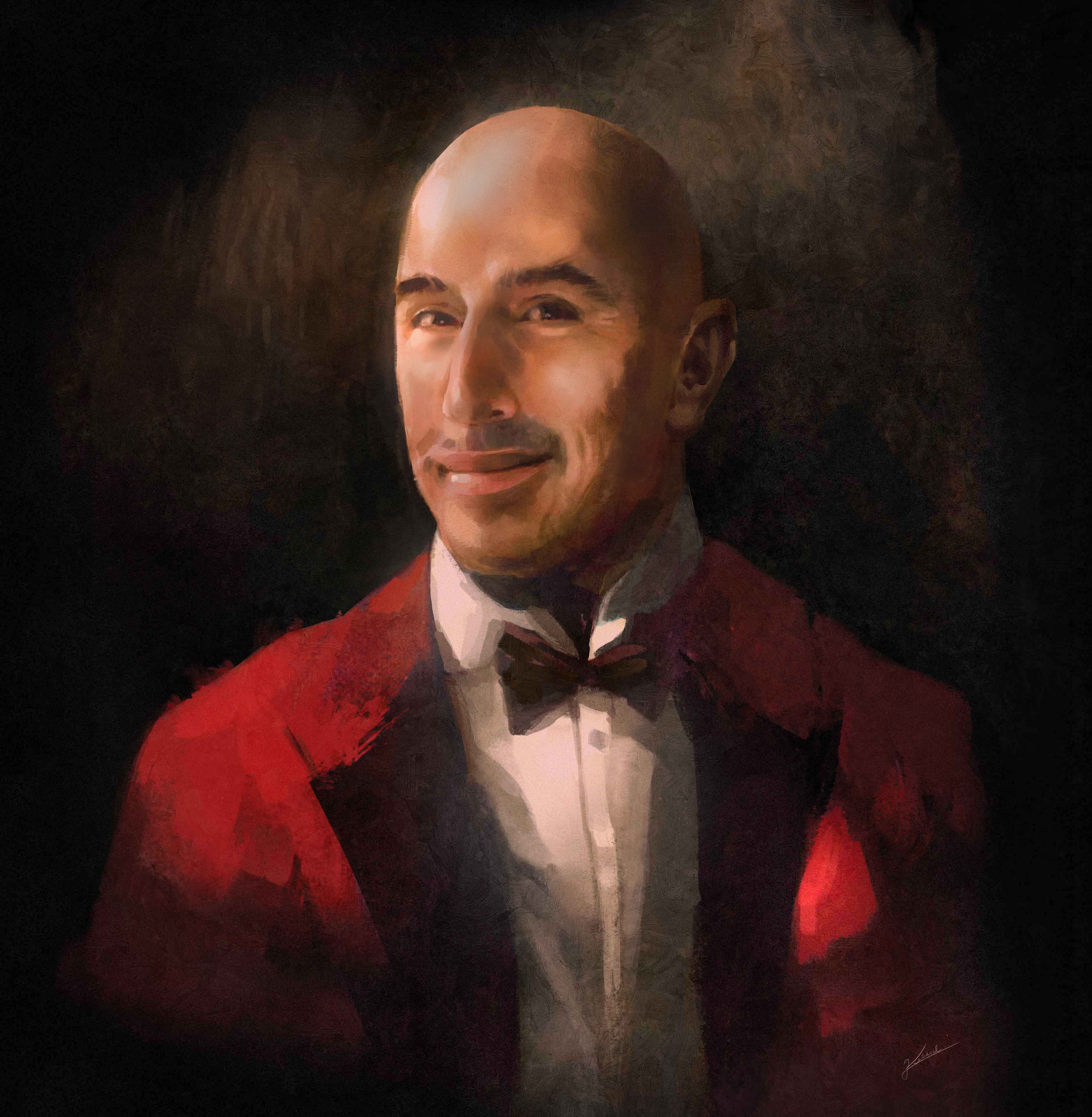

Background information
- Born: Paul Anthony Romero; September 10, 1965 (age 61); Southern California, U.S.
- Genre: Classical music
- Occupations: Pianist, computer and video game music composer
- Instruments: Piano, harpsichord
- Label: Yamaha music label

Paul Anthony Romero (born 10 September, 1965) is an American computer and video game music composer and classical pianist who has won awards for his work.

== Early life and classical piano ==
Romero taught himself to play the piano at the age of three. He began his formal piano and composition training at the age of 9 and made his concert debut when he was 11, playing a Mozart piano concerto with the Santa Monica Symphony Orchestra. He composed his first original piano concerto at the age of 13. This concerto was premiered by the United States National Symphony Orchestra of Washington, D.C., under Mstislav Rostropovich, with Romero as the piano soloist. The premiere took place at the Kennedy Center and was followed by an encore performance at the United Nations General Assembly Hall in New York City. The concert was televised around the world and brought him international attention as a young composing prodigy. The Yamaha music label recorded the concerts, a CD which is still available in Japan.

At the age of 15 Romero composed and performed his Piano Concerto in C major for piano, Electone, and timpani at the 9th Yamaha International Junior Original Concert at Togo no Sato Interior Hall in Japan in 1980. He was also selected to represent the United States at the 10th Yamaha International Junior Original Concert in 1981 with the performance of his solo piano piece "3 Preludes."

At the age of 16 he received a full college scholarship to the Curtis Institute of Music in Philadelphia, Pennsylvania, where he studied composing under Pulitzer Prize winner, Ned Rorem. He also studied piano under Vladimir Sokoloff, Jorge Bolet, and Chamber music with members of the Guanari String quartet. He finished his musical training at the Conservatoire de Paris in France and the Guildhall School of Music and Drama in London England.

In 2002, he became the winner of the International Piano Competition for Outstanding Amateurs in Paris, which is widely considered to be one of the top-level competitions for amateur musicians in the world.

He has performed in Tokyo, London, Paris, New York, Poznań, and Washington, D.C. He has performed at the Walt Disney Concert Hall in Los Angeles, California, the Mexican Embassy in Washington, D.C., the Palace of the France-Ameriques Institute in Paris, Carnegie Hall in New York, and two performances at the Gemäldegalerie in Berlin, Germany, as well as one performance at the Berliner Philharmonie. His latest CD, "An American In Paris", features his live performance in Paris of George Gershwin's Rhapsody in Blue.

He is a contributor along with Rob King and Steve Baca to the Heroes of Might and Magic series of computer games and numerous other games. He has won a number of international piano competitions including the Paris and the Van Cliburn international amateur piano competitions.

== Films and game music ==
Romero has composed over 70 original soundtrack film and computer game scores, including the orchestral/operatic/choral scores for the New World Computing/Ubisoft computer game series Heroes of Might and Magic. The scores are so popular that Romero was obliged to compose his first symphony based on the best musical themes from his "Heroes" soundtrack. His Symphony No. 1, entitled "Heroes" was completed in 2008.

Romero is also the composer of the Sony Online Entertainment fantasy-themed massively multiplayer online role-playing game (MMORPG), EverQuest (from expansions Planes of Power to Dragons of Norrath). He won the Broadcast Music Incorporated (BMI) Jerry Goldsmith Film Composers Award, and also received two National Endowment for the Arts (NEA) grants. Two of his original scores for the Heroes of Might and Magic series have been listed in GameSpot Magazine's All-time top ten computer game scores. The CD soundtrack collection from the complete Heroes series was released in January 2008 by Ubisoft.

Romero will be featured in a new Sundance Channel Documentary film, "The Gift", a feature-length documentary about classical musicians who were former child prodigies.

== Personal life ==
Romero once appeared on an episode of Family Feud, along with his family, which aired on February 3, 1989. On that episode, he performed Mozart's Turkish March as a demonstration of his talent (though his family did not win the game).

Romero lives in Sherman Oaks, California with his long-term partner, physician and saxophonist Brock Summers.
