= Rob King =

American musician

Robert King (born 1970 in Los Angeles) has (along with Paul Romero) composed the music for the Heroes of Might and Magic, Might and Magic series and additional music for the MMORPG Everquest. He also created music and character sound effects for Everquest: Gates of Discord for Sony Online. In the early 2000s (decade), he was a member of the alternative rock band Red Delicious.

Rob King is the owner and operator of Green Street Studios, a private sound recording facility in Sherman Oaks, California.
