= Heroes of Might and Magic: Olden Era =

2026 strategy video game

- Developer: Unfrozen
- Publishers: Hooded Horse; Ubisoft
- Composer: Paul Romero
- Series: Heroes of Might and Magic
- Platform: Windows
- Release: April 30, 2026 (early access)
- Genre: Turn-based strategy
- Modes: Single-player, multiplayer

Heroes of Might and Magic: Olden Era is a turn-based strategy game developed by Unfrozen and published by Hooded Horse and Ubisoft for Windows. An installment in the Heroes of Might and Magic series, it contains mechanics, role-playing elements and features not widely presented in the series; in addition to a single-player mode, the game supports multiplayer, co-op, and a map editor. A demo version of the game was published on Steam on October 9, 2025. It was released in early access on April 30, 2026.

== Gameplay ==
The gameplay is similar to the previous games in the series; the player controls a number of heroes with unique abilities, buying an army of mythological creatures and soldiers with available resources. The player also controls one or more of six town types present in the game: Temple, Necropolis, Grove, Dungeon, Hive and Schism, the last of which was revealed on August 21, 2025. The player can slowly build up the town, growing their army and expanding gameplay possibilities, such as the use of magic by researching spells or enacting faction laws - innovational mechanic for the series, which provides unique for each faction bonuses for a special currency.

The gameplay is divided into two parts: tactical overland exploration and a turn-based combat system. The heroes controlled by the player gather experience by fighting with monsters and enemy heroes using their army, respectively increasing their level when the sufficient amount of experience is collected. With each level, heroes are offered to choose between three different secondary skills and four subskills, which provide additional bonuses to the chosen secondary skill; each skill is aimed at enhancing hero's abilities in battle, magic casting or general interactions, such as increasing gold income per turn. Each hero also possesses four main attributes that are increased with each level: attack, defence, spellpower and knowledge - typical for Heroes of Might and Magic series.

The player can choose between four available game modes - "Arena", a quick battle between two heroes, "Classic", a randomly generated world where many heroes can be hired, "Single-Hero", where the player is limited to only one hero, and "Scenario", featuring hand-made maps with their own plot.

== Plot ==
Olden Era is set on the same world as the first three games of the franchise, Enroth, happening before the events of Heroes of Might and Magic: A Strategic Quest on the continent of Jadame, which was the setting of Might and Magic VIII: Day of the Destroyer but has not been featured in any previous games of the spin-off series Heroes of Might and Magic before. The game contains a playable campaign mode, divided into several acts, telling a story about a minotaur Gunnar who uncovers a new threat to the world - the faction of Hive, which corrupts and destroys the lands of Jadame. In order to prevent future consequences, former rival factions across the continent must unite to oppose the leader of Hive - the Dragonfly King.

== Development ==
Player looking at the strategic map with various map objects, towns and units on it.

Heroes of Might and Magic: Olden Era was announced at Gamescom in August 2024. Unfrozen, previously known from Iratus: Lord of the Dead, is developing the game under an agreement with Ubisoft and Hooded Horse. The planned early access release of the game coincides with the franchise's 30th anniversary. Many journalists say that the Heroes of Might and Magic: Olden Era is heavily inspired by Heroes of Might and Magic III.

The developers periodically posted information about future factions of the game leading up to the early access release. The first faction that was presented was Necropolis, gameplay of which was shown on October 31, 2024, dedicated to the celebration of Halloween. On December 22 it was confirmed that the music will be written by Paul Romero (one of the main composers of the previous entries in the series) and Cris Velasco (known for working on games such as God of War, Starcraft II and Mass Effect). It was also confirmed that the Heroes Orchestra - a group famous for performing the series' compositions in orchestral format before live audiences at concert halls - will be involved in the musical accompaniment for Olden Era, working on orchestral in-game soundtracks.

On March 17, 2025, Unfrozen started a closed beta test of a new "arena" game mode, which allows player to quickly engage in combat with an other player or creature. The tests ended on March 28. On April 10, 2025, as part of the Triple-i Initiative video game showcase, a cinematic story trailer was released, revealing that the game would be available in early access in summer 2025. On August 21, 2025, the "secret" sixth faction was revealed, called "Schism". Jon Van Caneghem joined Unfrozen as creative advisor for Olden Era in 2026.

On April 1, 2026, Unfrozen announced that the game will be released in early access on April 30, 2026. At the time of announcement, Olden Era was in top 10 most wishlisted games on Steam. Olden Era sold 250,000 copies within 24 hours of being released into early access, breaking even on its roughly USD $5,500,000 development costs.

== Reception ==
The game has been widely accepted as a good continuation of the series with "deep and complex gameplay", offering a lot of freedom in gameplay. Other reviewers note that it contains an "overwhelming sense of nostalgia", a familiar experience and "everything that could have been asked from a new game in the series". Olden Era is considered one of the most anticipated games of its year, and was described by some journalists as a "new era for strategy". The game has collected more than 15,000 concurrent players in less than 20 minutes after the release of the early access, reaching the peak online at around 50,000 players, and having more than 1.5 million wishlists on Steam. Olden Era sold over 500,000 copies within 72 hours of its early access release on Steam.
