= NetDragon Websoft =

Chinese gaming company

- Traded as: SEHK: 777
- Genre: massively multiplayer online games
- Founded: May 1999
- Headquarters: Fuzhou, China
- Number of employees: 3300 (in 2014)
- Subsidiaries: JumpStart Games
- Website: http://ir.netdragon.com/

NetDragon Websoft
- Simplified Chinese: 福建网龙计算机网络信息技术有限公司
- Literal meaning: NetDragon (Fujian) Computer Network Information Technology Co Ltd
Transcriptions
Standard Mandarin
- Hanyu Pinyin: Fújiàn wǎng lóng jìsuànjī wǎngluò xìnxī jìshù yǒuxiàn gōngsī

NetDragon Websoft is a Chinese company that develops and operates massively multiplayer online games in addition to making mobile applications. The company debuted its first product in 2002.

Some self-developed games it operates in China are based on Western IP, such as properties of Disney, Electronic Arts, and Ubisoft. Other games based on its own IP are distributed in CIS nations, the Middle East, North Africa, Portugal, Russia, and Vietnam, etc. Some games are also available in English.

Prior to selling this side of the business to Baidu, the company created a mobile phone app store stocked with self-created games and applications. NetDragon had differentiated itself by eschewing selling apps through the distribution channels of others, instead creating its own; in essence making consumers download a separate app to download their apps, allowing them exposure to other Netdragon offerings in the process.

The company headquarters, completed in 2014, garnered media attention for being inspired by Star Trek.

== Education ==
NetDragon Websoft started getting involved in education in 2010 with the aims to develop "the largest learning community globally."

NetDragon has made several acquisitions regarding education and community, amongst which are included:

- A partnership with the University of North Texas to launch the UNT-NetDragon Digital Research Centre.
- Edmodo was acquired by NetDragon on April 8, 2018.
- On July 3, 2017, NetDragon announced that it had acquired American educational software publisher JumpStart Games.
- NetDragon also acquired a 100 percent stake in the UK-listed Promethean World back in 2015.

== Sale of 91 Wireless ==
NetDragon sold its app store, 91 Wireless, to Baidu in 2013 for $1.85 billion. At that time, the sale was hailed as the biggest deal ever in China's IT sector. As the company controlled less than 58% of 91 Wireless, Netdragon took an estimated $1.06 billion from the sale.

The mobile applications available through this store, many of which are "91" branded, include more than just mobile games – containing genres from fortune telling to wealth management.

== CSR ==
The company sponsors the Fujian NetDragon Youth Business Foundation, which helps entrepreneurial youth to start a small business.

== See also ==
- Disney Fantasy Online
- Heroes of Might and Magic Online
- Transformers Online
- 91kt.com
- 91 Wireless
- Edmodo
- Promethean World
- JumpStart
