= Gregory Fulton =

American computer game designer

Gregory Fulton is an American computer game designer best known for his work on the Heroes of Might and Magic series as a lead game designer and manual author.

== Career ==
Was hired by New World Computing on the same day as David Mullich, they became friends.

In 1997 sent his resume by e-mail. Was interviewed by Jon Van Caneghem — creator of the company, later by Mark Caldwell. Later got a call from Mark, discussed the salary, Greg accepted, and after 7 days started his first workday. By his memories, New World Computing was full of shy introverts.

Left the New World Computing company after backlash for the Forge content before creating The Shadow of Death and moved to Westwood Studio as a lead game designer of Command and Conquer: Renegade.

In 2026 Fulton consulted on two mods for Heroes of Might and Magic III which were working on new incarnations of the Forge: Horn of the Abyss and Day of Reckoning. The Horn of the Abyss project was part of a collaboration with Ubisoft and Archon for the board game adaptation, which was also receiving a Forge based expansion. He has stated that the Horn of the Abyss version will be closer to Archon's board game interpretation, and Day of Reckoning will be closer to his original draft from 1999.

== Published works ==
Year	Title	Developer	Ref.
1995	MechWarrior 2: 31st Century Combat	Activision	
1999	Heroes of Might and Magic: Millennium Edition	New World Computing	
1999	Heroes of Might and Magic III: The Restoration of Erathia	New World Computing	
1999	Heroes of Might and Magic III: Armageddon's Blade	New World Computing	
2000	Heroes of Might and Magic III: The Shadow of Death	New World Computing	
2002	Command & Conquer: Renegade	Westwood Studios	

In 2018 was working on two indie projects, one of them — Fanstratics, in the style of HoMM3, abandoned in 2025 because of health problems related to COVID-19.

In 2020 interview he mentioned Ultima as "not the best RPG game ever created, but it laid the foundation for all my favorite RPGs."
