= Heroes of Might and Magic Online =

2008 video game

- Developer: TQ Digital Entertainment
- Publisher: NetDragon Websoft Inc
- Series: Heroes of Might and Magic
- Platform: Web browser
- Release: May 30, 2008
- Genre: Fantasy MMORPG
- Mode: Multiplayer

Heroes of Might and Magic Online was a 2.5D MMORPG for the Chinese market and developed by Netdragon. It was part of the Heroes of Might and Magic franchise.

Originally scheduled for release in late 2005, the final release was delayed for three years, and the game launched in May 2008.

The game was free of charge.

Heroes of Might and Magic Online finally went offline on 31 March 2014.

== Story ==
The background story was set in the same world as Heroes III (most notably the kingdom of Erathia) although Ubisoft—the Might and Magic brand rights licensor—introduced a new universe for the whole Might and Magic series after having acquired the rights from The 3DO Company. The game did not appear to have an actual story, however, and any events that took place in it would not be considered canon.

== Features ==
Heroes of Might and Magic Online featured four magic systems and allowed the player to choose heroes from eight factions comprising a total of 56 unit types. It was staged on three different levels:

- A global, randomly generated level, where players moved and interacted in a typical MMORPG fashion (in realtime)
- A strategic level, similar to a Heroes III map, where the heroes moved within a certain amount of time
- A turn-based 3D combat level using a tactical grid, similar to the combat mode in Heroes III

== English version ==
A closed beta test for the English version was held from May 7 to June 9, 2010. Two days later, on June 11, the game went live.

The English version only allowed users with Asian IP addresses to play, since TQ's license from Ubisoft was for Asia only.
