= Heroes of Might and Magic (GBC video game) =

- Heroes of Might and Magic box art
- Genre: Turn-based strategy
- Developer: KnowWonder
- Publisher: The 3DO Company
- Original release: Heroes of Might and Magic: NA: June 20, 2000; EU: October 20, 2000; Heroes of Might and Magic II: NA: December 8, 2000; EU: March 16, 2001

Heroes of Might and Magic is a series of games that were remade for the Game Boy Color. They are based on early games in the original Heroes of Might and Magic series. The remakes were developed by KnowWonder and published by The 3DO Company.

== Heroes of Might and Magic ==
The first game is a port of Heroes of Might and Magic: A Strategic Quest, but without multiplayer capabilities.

== Heroes of Might and Magic II ==
Buildings based on the graphics in Heroes of Might and Magic: A Strategic Quest

The second game is a mix of the first three Heroes with many graphics converted from Heroes of Might and Magic III, while gameplay functionality resembles a mix of Heroes I, II and III. The campaign centers around a dragon slayer quest.

== Towns and creatures ==
There are four towns available to play: Knight, Barbarian, Sorceress and Warlock town. Each town has seven different troops available, most of them being directly copied from Heroes of Might and Magic III, having the same stats, abilities and appearance. The knight town uses troops from the Heroes of Might and Magic III Castle faction, the Barbarian has Stronghold troops, the Sorceress has Rampart troops and the Warlock has Fortress troops. There are also a few neutral troops available, not belonging to any town.

== Reception ==
=== Heroes of Might and Magic ===
Heroes of Might and Magic

Aggregate score
Aggregator	Score
GameRankings	63%

Review scores
Publication	Score
EP Daily	6/10
GameSpot	4.6/10
IGN	7/10
Nintendo Power	6.7/10

The original Heroes received mixed reviews according to the review aggregation website GameRankings.

=== Heroes of Might and Magic II ===
Heroes of Might and Magic II

Aggregate score
Aggregator	Score
GameRankings	77%

Review scores
Publication	Score
MeriStation	7.2/10
Nintendo Power	3/5

Heroes II received more favorable reviews than the original according to GameRankings.
