= Sam Lantinga =

American computer programmer

Sam Oscar Lantinga
- Other name: Slouken
- Employer(s): Loki Entertainment (1999–2001); Blizzard Entertainment (2001–2011); Galaxy Gameworks (2011); 38 Studios (2011–2012); Valve (2012–present)

Sam Oscar Lantinga is a computer programmer. He used to be the lead software engineer at Blizzard Entertainment, where he was known to the community as Slouken. He is best known as the creator of the Simple DirectMedia Layer, a very popular open source multimedia programming library, and also developed the compatibility database for Executor, a proprietary Mac OS emulator.

He was the lead programmer and a co-founder of the now-defunct Loki Software, which ported several game titles to Linux. A Linux client of World of Warcraft was developed, and negotiations with Linux Game Publishing were under way until Blizzard cancelled the project. Lantinga explained in 2018 that he was told to stop work on the Linux port by Mike Morhaime due to lack of support resources.

He also founded Galaxy Gameworks in 2008 to help commercially support the Simple DirectMedia Layer. He left Blizzard Entertainment to "relax, spend time with family, and explore some ideas to expand the Galaxy Gameworks business." Soon after he launched a new website for Gameworks including an extensive list of developer testimonials. Lantinga went on to work for 38 Studios, which shut down in May 2012. Since August 2012 Lantinga has been employed at Valve.

== Games credited ==
The following is a list of game products Lantinga either developed on or was involved in porting.

=== Blizzard Entertainment ===
- Hearthstone
- World of Warcraft
- Warcraft III: Reign of Chaos

=== Loki Software ===
- Kohan: Immortal Sovereigns
- Tribes 2
- MindRover
- Sid Meier's Alpha Centauri
- Rune
- Rune: Halls of Valhalla
- Heavy Gear II
- Heretic II
- Heroes of Might and Magic III
- Railroad Tycoon II
- Civilization: Call To Power

=== Ambrosia Software ===
- Maelstrom
