= Heroes of Might and Magic III: Horn of the Abyss =

Unofficial expansion for Heroes 3

- Developer: HotA Crew
- Composers: Docent Picolan; Paul Romero
- Series: Heroes of Might and Magic
- Platform: Windows
- Release: December 31, 2011
- Genre: Turn-based strategy
- Modes: Single-player, multiplayer

Heroes of Might and Magic III: Horn of the Abyss (abbreviated as HotA) is an unofficial non-commercial mod for Heroes of Might and Magic III, known as one of the largest expansions for the game. It was released in 2011, and is still being updated over 25 years after the release of the original game. It adds three new town types, a large number of new map items, new playable campaigns, a random map generator template editor, and a campaign editor, support for giant maps, together with other improvements and features.

While unofficial, content from the mod was included in the official board game adaptation as part of a 2024 collaboration with Ubisoft and Archon. Several of the original developers have worked with the modding team, with new music from Paul Romero and design consultancy from Gregory Fulton. Considering the mod's high quality and the team's collaboration with Ubisoft, the mod has been called "almost canon".

== Gameplay ==
The mod introduces many quality of life and balance changes to the original version, new artifacts, including unreleased ones from the original game, map objects, campaigns, terrains and mechanics like unit stacking or negative luck, as well as small visual changes. The expansion also includes a multiplayer lobby, where players can chat and host server sessions, together with simultaneous turns mechanic, not presented in the original game. The mod also includes 4 new playable factions:

- Cove, a pirate-themed faction.
- Factory, a steampunk-themed faction.
- Bulwark, a faction based around Nordic, Celtic and Siberian cultures.
- Forge, a futuristic faction which was cut from Armageddon's Blade; currently is in development.

== Plot ==
The plot is told through several campaigns, each uncovering the story behind the new factions. Like in the original game, the player controls the characters, progressing through the story.

==== Cove ====
The main storyline is bound to the town of Cove and is told through the campaigns "Under the Jolly Roger", "Terror of the Seas" and "Horn of the Abyss" with the main characters being a Regnan pirate Jeremy Albatross and his brother Bidley Roberts. They search for the legendary artifact known as "Horn of the Abyss", which allows its owner to rule the element of water; after overcoming competitors, brothers obtain the artifact and Bidley becomes the ruler of Regna.

==== Factory ====
Campaign "Forged in Fire" tells the story behind the Factory town, following the race of Halflings, who flee to the continent of Jadame with Frederick - an inventor and former wizard from Bracada - from the Kreegans who invaded Eofol. They settle in the city of Burton, that they develop into a technologically advanced city-state, and eventually reclaim their homeland from the hostile Kreegans.

== Development ==
The mod was initially founded in 2007 by a Russian developer and composer using the pseudonym Docent Picolan who collected a team of enthusiasts on online forums dedicated to Heroes III. The game already had an established modding and map-making community online. The HotA Crew describe themselves as a group of developers who were impacted by the game at a formative age. Many of them are game developers or IT professionals who contribute to the project in their free time.

The team employed a different design philosophy than was used for the older mod In the Wake of Gods, being more careful to consider the nuances of player experience over simply adding functionality to the base game without that concern. In interview, the team described the process as "a long, bumpy ride fraught with much uncertainty and inner conflict; at the same time, it has been a powerful sequence of successes and achievements that keep fuelling our desire to go on." They discussed a desire to maintain a high quality benchmark and maintain a balance between adding new material and respecting what came before. The original version of the mod launched on December 31, 2011, featuring the Cove faction; it saw continuous updates through the 2010s adding additional features.

On November 7, 2020, it was reported that Docent Picolan died in a traffic accident, which was a big loss for HotA Crew, where Picolan played a crucial role as a leader, although the mod development eventually continued further.

=== Collaboration with Ubisoft ===
In 2022, Ubisoft's Might and Magic brand director Eric Damian-Vernet approached the Horn of the Abyss team, to discuss the possibility of including content from the mod in an expansion for the official board game version. The collaboration—involving staff at Ubisoft, at the board game company Archon, and at the HotA Crew—was announced publicly in April 2024. The collaboration led to a Cove expansion for the board game, with Archon acknowledging that the pirates of Regna were canon, albeit not well explored, within the established Might and Magic setting.

Two more factions were added, with the Factory in 2023 and then the Bulwark in 2025. In 2026, three further board game expansions were announced to coincide with the 30th anniversary of the franchise, two of which added the new Factory and Bulwark towns. The third new expansion was revealed as the Forge faction, which had been originally intended for inclusion in Armageddon's Blade but cut due to negative reception at the time. The HotA Crew were placed in contact with former New World Computing designer Gregory Fulton to produce an original vision of this faction for the board game, which is also to be added to the mod itself. The Forge will feature new playable heroes written by both the HotA team and Fulton himself. Fulton has also consulted on the Day of Reckoning mod's version of Forge, and has stated that the HotA version will be closer to Archon's board game interpretation than to the original draft from 1999 which will be more closely represented by the Day of Reckoning incarnation.

The mod was made available via Steam on August 26, 2026, for the Complete edition of Heroes III.

== Reception ==
The modification is known for its high-quality content, containing the feel of the original 'all-time classic' game, evoking a feeling of nostalgia. Reviewers noted that Heroes III is "in its best shape ever" mainly due to the efforts of enthusiasts of HotA. Other expansions for Heroes III, like In the Wake of Gods, are considered by reviewers significantly worse in quality than Horn of the Abyss. The board game developer Archon credited the mod with extending the longevity of the game.
