= List of PC games (Q) =

The following page is an alphabetical section from the list of PC games.

== Q ==
| Name | Developer | Publisher | Genre(s) | Operating system(s) | Date released |
|---|---|---|---|---|---|
| Quake | id Software | GT Interactive | First-person shooter | MS-DOS, Linux, macOS | June 22, 1996 |
| Quake II | id Software, Logicware, Raster Productions, Hammerhead | Activision, Macmillan Digital Publishing USA | First-person shooter | Microsoft Windows, Linux, macOS, Amiga | December 9, 1997 |
| Quake III Arena | id Software, Raster Productions, Bullfrog Productions, Pi Studios | Activision, Loki Software, Sega, Electronic Arts | First-person shooter | Microsoft Windows, Linux, macOS, Amiga | December 2, 1999 |
| Quake 4 | Raven Software, id Software | Activision Bethesda Softworks | First-person shooter | Microsoft Windows, Linux, macOS | October 18, 2005 |
