= SMPEG =

SDL MPEG
- Developer(s): Loki Software
- Initial release: 2000
- Stable release: 0.4.5 / July 17, 2001; 24 years ago
- Written in: C
- License: LGPL
- Website: icculus.org/smpeg/

The SDL MPEG library was developed by Loki Software. It follows the MPEG-1 standard rather than MPEG-2 because MPEG-2 is restricted by software patents in the United States of America. It uses the LGPL.
