= ESDL =

ESDL may stand for:

- EPOC SDL, a port of the programming library SDL to Symbian OS.
- Erlang SDL, a port of SDL to the Erlang programming language.
