= 91kt.com =

Website in China

- Available in: Standard Chinese in simplified characters
- Owners: Turner Broadcasting System Asia Pacific and NetDragon
- Website: www.91kt.com
- Launched: October 2011; 15 years ago

91kt.com is a joint venture between Turner Broadcasting System Asia Pacific and Netdragon. The site serves as an official website of Cartoon Network in China. It has Flash games and bulletin boards, and has television series available as a video on demand service.

In the People's Republic of China, Cartoon Network has a dedicated TV channel, and also its original series are broadcast on terrestrial TV channels, notably, The Powerpuff Girls broadcast on China Central Television.

The service launched in October 2011. In addition to the Cartoon Network series, it also carried a local title (AI Football GGO).

== List of Cartoon Network programming on China TV stations ==
English names	Chinese names (Simplified)	Channel	Network
Ben 10 (2005 TV series)	BEN 10 外星传奇	CCTV-6	China Central Television
Ben 10 (2005 TV series)	BEN 10 外星传奇	Jiajia Cartoon (嘉佳卡通)	Guangdong Radio and Television
Ben 10 (2005 TV series)	BEN 10 外星传奇	Aniworld (金鹰卡通)	Hunan Broadcasting System
Ben 10: Alien Force	BEN 10 外星英雄	Jiajia Cartoon (嘉佳卡通)	Guangdong Radio and Television
Ben 10: Ultimate Alien	BEN 10 终极英雄	Jiajia Cartoon (嘉佳卡通)	Guangdong Radio and Television
Ben 10: Omniverse	少年骇客全面进化	CCTV-14	China Central Television
Ben 10: Omniverse	少年骇客全面进化	Aniworld (金鹰卡通)	Hunan Broadcasting System
Ben 10 (2016 TV series)	BEN 10 再显神威	Haha-Toonmax (哈哈炫动) (from 22 February 2019)	Shanghai Media Group
Ben 10: Secret of the Omnitrix		CCTV-6	China Central Television
Ben 10: Secret of the Omnitrix		Jiajia Cartoon (嘉佳卡通)	Guangdong Radio and Television
Ben 10: Race Against Time	BEN 10 超时空圣战	CCTV-6	China Central Television
Ben 10: Race Against Time	BEN 10 超时空圣战	Jiajia Cartoon (嘉佳卡通)	Guangdong Radio and Television
Ben 10: Alien Swarm	少年骇客之异形群体	CCTV-6	China Central Television
Ben 10: Alien Swarm	少年骇客之异形群体	Jiajia Cartoon (嘉佳卡通)	Guangdong Radio and Television
Ben 10: Destroy All Aliens	BEN 10 之歼灭外星怪	CCTV-6	China Central Television
Ben 10: Destroy All Aliens	BEN 10 之歼灭外星怪	Jiajia Cartoon (嘉佳卡通)	Guangdong Radio and Television
Dexter's Laboratory	德克斯特的实验室	CCTV-6	China Central Television
Dexter's Laboratory	德克斯特的实验室	Toonmax (炫动卡通)	Shanghai Media Group
Cow and Chicken	鸡与牛	Toonmax (炫动卡通)	Shanghai Media Group
I Am Weasel		Haha-Toonmax (哈哈炫动)	Shanghai Media Group
The Powerpuff Girls	飞天小女警	CCTV-1 CCTV-7 CCTV-14	China Central Television
The Powerpuff Girls	飞天小女警	Jiajia Cartoon (嘉佳卡通)	Guangdong Radio and Television
The Powerpuff Girls	飞天小女警	Toonmax (炫动卡通)	Shanghai Media Group
Powerpuff Girls Z	飞天小女警Z	Jiajia Cartoon (嘉佳卡通)	Guangdong Radio and Television
Tom and Jerry	猫和老鼠	CCTV-1 CCTV-14 Jiajia Cartoon (嘉佳卡通) Kaku Kids (卡酷少儿) Haha-Toonmax (哈哈炫动) Youman Cartoon (优漫卡通) Aniworld (金鹰卡通)	China Central Television Guangdong Radio and Television Beijing Media Network Shanghai Media Group Jiangsu Broadcasting Corporation Hunan Broadcasting System
Tom and Jerry Tales	猫和老鼠：传奇	Jiajia Cartoon (嘉佳卡通)	Guangdong Radio and Television
The Tom and Jerry Show (2014 TV series)	新版猫和老鼠	CCTV-1 CCTV-14	China Central Television
Scooby-Doo, Where Are You!		CCTV-14 Haha-Toonmax (哈哈炫动)	China Central Television Shanghai Media Group
DreamWorks Dragons	驯龙高手	CCTV-14	China Central Television
The Looney Tunes Show	乐一通秀场	CCTV-14	China Central Television
Young Justice (TV series)	少年正义联盟	CCTV-14	China Central Television
The Powerpuff Girls (2016 TV series)	飞天小女警（2016）	Haha-Toonmax (哈哈炫动)	Shanghai Media Group
We Bare Bears	咱们裸熊	Haha-Toonmax (哈哈炫动)	Shanghai Media Group

== List of Cartoon Network shows on China video platforms ==
English names	Simplified Chinese names	Tencent Video	IQiyi	Youku	Mango TV (China ver.)
Adventure Time	探险活宝	Yes	No	Yes	No
The Amazing World of Gumball	阿甘妙世界	Yes	Yes	Yes	No
Steven Universe	宇宙小子史蒂芬	Yes	Yes	No	No
We Bare Bears	咱们裸熊	Yes	Yes	Yes	Yes
The Powerpuff Girls (2016 TV series)	飞天小女警（2016重新版）	Yes	Yes	Yes	No
Ben 10 (2016 TV series)	少年骇客再显神威	Yes	No	No	No
OK K.O.! Let's Be Heroes	O.K, K.O.! 一起成为英雄吧	Yes	No	No	No
Summer Camp Island	夏令营奇幻岛	No	No	No	Yes
Mighty Magiswords	超级魔剑	Yes	No	No	No
Lego Ninjago: Masters of Spinjitzu	乐高幻影忍者	Yes	Yes	Yes	No
Teen Titans Go! (TV series)	少年泰坦出击	No	No	Yes	No
Nexo Knights	乐高未来骑士团	Yes	No	Yes	No
Unikitty!	独角猫	No	No	Yes	No
The Powerpuff Girls	飞天小女警	Yes	Yes	Yes	Yes
Foster's Home for Imaginary Friends	亲亲麻吉	No	Yes	No	No
My Gym Partner's a Monkey	我的麻吉是猴子	No	Yes	No	No
Ben 10 (2005 TV series)	少年骇客	Yes	No	Yes	No
Chowder (TV series)	爱吃鬼乔达	No	Yes	No	No
Ben 10: Alien Force	少年骇客外星英雄	Yes	No	Yes	No
Ben 10: Ultimate Alien	少年骇客终极异形	Yes	No	No	No
Regular Show	日常生活	No	No	Yes	No
Ben 10: Omniverse	少年骇客最终进化	Yes	No	No	No
Uncle Grandpa	天才阿公	No	Yes	No	No
Clarence	我爱阿噗	Yes	Yes	No	No
Over the Garden Wall	花园墙外	Yes	No	No	No
Batman: The Brave and the Bold	蝙蝠侠：英勇无畏	Yes	No	No	No
Tom and Jerry	猫和老鼠	Yes	Yes	Yes	Yes
Tom and Jerry Tales	猫和老鼠传奇	No	No	No	Yes
The Tom and Jerry Show (2014 TV series)	新猫和老鼠	No	No	No	Yes

Former: Courage the Cowardly Dog (Tencent Video), Dexter Laboratory (Youku/Le.com), Codename: Kids Next Door, The Grim Adventures of Billy and Mandy (Le.com)

Coming Soon: Apple and Onion (苹果与洋葱)

Notes: Some programs available with Simplified Chinese subtitles such as We Bare Bears, Unikitty!, Summer Camp Island, etc.
