= Gazillionaire =

1994 trading simulation video game

- Developer(s): LavaMind
- Publisher(s): Spectrum HoloByte
- Designer(s): Stephen S. Hoffman; Naomi Kokubo
- Platform(s): Windows
- Release: 1994
- Genre(s): Business simulation
- Mode(s): Single-player, multiplayer

Gazillionaire, also stylized as Gazillionaire!, is a science-fiction business simulation developed by American studio LavaMind and originally published by Spectrum HoloByte for Windows-compatible PCs in 1994.

== Gameplay ==
Gazillionaire is a trading game involving trading exotic goods on different planets. The player controls a company and interacts with six other trade companies controlled by the computer, as they compete to build an empire by investing in larger ships, buying warehouses, outmaneuvering each other and transporting essential commodities such as Kryptoons, cantaloupes, hair tonic, polyester, frog legs, umbrellas and Oggle Sand between a choice of seven planets within the Kukubian empire led by Emperor Dred Nicholson.

== Development and release ==
Gazillionaire was created by venture capitalist husband and wife team Steven S. Hoffman and Naomi Kokubo at their independent company LavaMind. Kokubo has a background in international finance and filmmaking while Hoffman has a background in interactive software development, electrical computer engineering, and information technology consulting. The pair met as college students and were pursuing their respective careers in Japan in 1992: Kokubo in film and finance and Hoffman working at Sega headquarters in Tokyo. After moving to San Francisco in early 1994, the couple founded LavaMind to focus on designing non-violent, intelligent video games. Gazillionaire was completely self-funded by the couple who did nearly all of the project's work themselves.

Development lasted nine months with a budget of $30,000 USD. LavaMind first made Gazillionaire available for Windows 3.1 as online shareware in late 1994. Because personal webpages were not prevalent in the early days of the internet, Hoffman shared a trial version on bulletin board systems with a full version sold via mail-order. Its retail distribution rights were picked up by Spectrum Holobyte shortly thereafter. Although Hoffman claimed Gazillionaire was technically outdated upon completion, he said the publisher quickly agreed to the partnership after its quality assurance team had fallen in love with it. The president of Spectrum Holobyte also informed Hoffman that its next big release, Star Trek: The Next Generation – A Final Unity, had been delayed to the following calendar year and that it needed a replacement to book revenue for the close of 1994 to prevent its stock price from dropping. This allowed Hoffman to negotiate an advance on royalty payment and the full rights to a Gazillionaire sequel after one year. LavaMind's creative goal with Gazillionaire was to teach financial skills and inspire entrepreneurship in its players. Gazillionaire proved popular as an educational video game and in the years following its launch it was adopted by various grade schools and universities as part of economic curriculums and by certain prisons to help reform convicts.

According to Kokubo, the game's technical limitations allowed for easy design tweaks to extend its longevity. An expanded edition, Gazillionaire Deluxe, was released toward the end of 1996. In addition to numerous gameplay improvements and added Windows 95 compatibility, it had a play-by-email mechanic for up to six people alongside to the hotseat multiplayer from the original game. The developer eventually found it difficult to commercially compete in brick-and-mortar stores and shifted to primarily selling the game online once again. By mid-1998, LavaMind estimated that 150,000 copies of Gazillionaire had been sold. Yet another update, Gazillionaire III, was released for download around 2007 and was compatible with Windows Vista, XP, 98, 2000, Me, and NT. A web browser release came in 2012 and required a yearly subscription fee. Finally, LavaMind published Gazillionaire on Steam on January 14, 2020 and was compatible with Windows 10 and Mac devices using up to the Big Sur operating system. This decision was made due to the impending discontinuation of Adobe Flash, software on which the most recent version was heavily relied. The Steam version includes hotseat multiplayer but no remote multiplayer.

== Reception ==
Next Generation reviewed the game, rating it two stars out of five, and stated that "A great title for gaming purists or children."

Computer Game Review scored Gazillionaire a 92 out of 100, earning the game its "Golden Triad Award". It was also named "Strategy Game of the Year" for 1995 from the magazine, tied with Heroes of Might and Magic: A Strategic Quest and Blood Bowl. The editors wrote, "Tucked behind the strange graphics, bizarre names and, um, interesting items to trade was an economic engine that proved to be as good as they come."

== Reviews ==
- PC Gamer (April 1995)
- Computer Gaming World (April 1995)
- PC Player - June 1995
- PC Games - July 1995
