= Heroes of Might and Magic III: The Shadow of Death =

- Developer: New World Computing
- Publishers: NA: The 3DO Company; EU: Ubisoft
- Director: David Mullich
- Producers: Mark Caldwell; Jeff Blattner
- Designers: Jennifer Bullard; Gregory Fulton; Jon Van Caneghem
- Composers: Paul Romero; Rob King; Steve Baca
- Series: Heroes of Might and Magic
- Platforms: Windows, Macintosh (Heroes III Complete only)
- Release: NA: March 21, 2000; EU: June 30, 2000
- Genre: Turn-based strategy
- Modes: Single-player, single-system multiplayer, or network play

Heroes of Might and Magic III: The Shadow of Death is the second of two expansion packs for the turn-based strategy game Heroes of Might and Magic III. It was developed by New World Computing for Microsoft Windows and released by The 3DO Company in 2000. The Shadow of Death is a standalone expansion pack that includes the original game.

== Changes ==
The Shadow of Death includes seven new campaigns with adjustable difficulty settings. The expansion also includes twelve new artifacts, minor balance tweaks and eight new terrain types designed to enhance hero attributes such as morale, luck and magic expertise. Each faction remains fundamentally unaltered. Additionally, the expansion introduces a fifth artifact equipment slot for all heroes, and ten new types of teleporters for use on the Adventure Map. A major addition is the inclusion of "combination artifacts", that is, artifacts pieced together from sets of other related artifacts. The combination artifacts bestow extremely powerful abilities, and feature prominently in the campaigns. The expansion pack also significantly improves the map editor, including new portraits for four of the new campaign heroes - Sandro, Finneas Vilmar, Yog and Gem - and other customization options.

=== Content from Armageddon's Blade ===
The Shadow of Death can be installed alongside the first Heroes of Might and Magic III expansion pack, Armageddon's Blade. New features included in the Armageddon's Blade expansion (such as the Conflux town) are present in The Shadow of Death, but are designed to remain hidden and inaccessible unless certain files installed by Armageddon's Blade are detected in the game's directory. The game, however, checks only for the presence of these files: it does not verify the file contents. Because of this, several gamers discovered that it was possible to create empty files with the correct file names to unlock the Armageddon's Blade enhancements in The Shadow of Death without having to install the earlier expansion pack.

== Story ==
The Shadow of Death campaigns serve as a prequel to both Might and Magic VI: The Mandate of Heaven and Heroes III: The Restoration of Erathia. The storyline revolves around Sandro the Necromancer, who has recently arrived on the continent of Antagarich following the events of Heroes of Might and Magic II. Sandro begins a ten-year plot to reassemble two ancient and powerful necromantic artifacts. He uses illusionary magic to take the form of a living human, which he uses to disguise himself.

Sandro first convinces the sorceress Gem and barbarian Crag Hack to find the pieces of the two artifacts for him, promising rewards in return. Unaware of Sandro's true nature, they agree to aid him in wresting the pieces away from other necromancers. However, once secured by the unwitting heroes, the pieces are spirited away by Sandro without fulfilling his end of the bargain. He reassembles the pieces into two whole artifacts, the Cloak of the Undead King and the Armor of the Damned.

Sandro battles a Dungeon army in the "Rise of the Necromancer" campaign.

With the Cloak and the Armor in his possession, Sandro battles the vengeful armies of his former warlock master, Ethric, and passes onward into the undead lands of Deyja. There, he vaults a puppet king, Finneas Vilmar, to the throne, attaining full political control of the undead lands. From there, he begins his plan to conquer the rest of the continent.

Some time later, amidst the war against the undead, the heroes Gem, Gelu, Yog and Crag Hack band together to combat the threat. They arrange to meet at the plains of Bragden, but are ambushed by Sandro himself and forced to flee. As they regroup, Yog recalls a task he performed earlier of dispensing the components of the Angelic Alliance, a mighty sword. The team of heroes decide to seek out the pieces of the sword and reassemble it. Succeeding, they push onward into Deyja, eventually cornering Sandro and defeating him. Afterwards, Gelu is chosen to become the Forest Guard's next captain, as referenced in Heroes of Might and Magic III: Armageddon's Blade. The heroes once again disperse the pieces of the necromantic artifacts as they part ways.

A final bonus campaign features Sandro after his defeat. The necromancer plots a second invasion, this time aimed squarely at Erathia. With the help of Lord Haart, he has King Nicolas Gryphonheart poisoned, and forms an alliance between Deyja, the Kreegans and Nighon against the human lands. However, he is tricked and imprisoned by his own puppet king, Finneas Vilmar, who then leads the invasion of Erathia which takes place during Heroes of Might and Magic III: The Restoration of Erathia.

== Reception ==
Reception

Aggregate score
Aggregator	Score
GameRankings	79%

Review scores
Publication	Score
Computer Games Strategy Plus	3.5/5
Eurogamer	8/10
GameFan	83%
GameRevolution	B
GameSpot	7/10
GameSpy	87%
Génération 4	4/6
IGN	9/10
Jeuxvideo.com	15/20
PC Zone	69%

The game received favorable reviews according to the review aggregation website GameRankings. It was praised for its map editor improvements and the fact that it did not require the base game to be installed, but it was criticised for its lack of new content outside of the single-player game.
