= Might & Magic Heroes VII =

2015 video game

- Developer: Limbic Entertainment
- Publisher: Ubisoft
- Designers: Anselm Rohland; Dirk Wagner; Jens Dreyer; Knut Arnold; Marcus Cool
- Writer: Erwan Le Breton
- Composers: Rob King; Paul Romero
- Series: Heroes of Might and Magic
- Engine: Unreal Engine 3
- Platform: Windows
- Release: September 29, 2015
- Genre: Turn-based strategy
- Modes: Single-player, multiplayer

Might & Magic Heroes VII is a 2015 turn-based strategy game in the Heroes of Might and Magic series. Like the other games in the series, players control leaders with magical abilities termed as "heroes", who recruit a variety of forces from strongholds. The heroes and their armies battle the opponents, who also use heroes to lead their forces. It features a campaign series of levels, standalone and multiplayer scenarios.

In 2016, the downloadable content Lost Tales of Axeoth was released. On August 4, 2016 Trial by Fire was released, featuring two new campaigns, a new faction (Fortress) and many gameplay improvements available for all owners of the main game as well. However, the expansion itself is sold as a standalone. Along with the expansion the game was updated to feature Denuvo DRM (since version 2.0). While all versions of MMH7 include a random map generator in the map editor, the Trial by Fire expansion added an in-game random map generator (which can also be used in other version of MMH7).

Two months after the release of the last expansion, Ubisoft announced that further game development was halted.

== Plot ==
Heroes VII takes place some 200 years after the events of Shades of Darkness, and ten years after the assassination of the Holy Empress Maeve Falcon (i.e. another 100 years before Heroes V). The story follows Ivan Griffin, Duke of Griffin Duchy, in his pursuit of the crown after the dissolution of the Falcon Empire; but to do so he must band together with a force of allies. One of which the world had not seen the likes of before.

== Gameplay ==
Gameplay follows similar tactics found within the Heroes of Might and Magic series. Strategy is key to the gameplay as battles are structured on a chess-like board where each player controls a faction of units. The battle involves turn-based gameplay, in which each creature has an opportunity to make a move. The battle is over when all the units of one side have been killed, or in a ceasefire scenario. During each player's turn on the adventure map, building or upgrading the main castle allows for better expansion on the map, as well as for the recruiting of an army. Players move their "Heroes" about the map, collecting resources and artifacts that provide benefits in later gameplay. By expanding their territory and capturing enemy towns, the player can build a larger army. The game is won when one player is left standing after all the rest have been defeated. The game includes a Campaign Mode similar to previous editions that follow various storylines of the main characters. Multiplayer and Online player capabilities allow the player to play against other human players.

== Development ==
The game was developed by the German studio Limbic Entertainment.

Four factions (Haven, Academy, Stronghold, and Necropolis) were announced together with the game, and the other two are picked by players in voting polls. The first voting poll was between Sylvan and Fortress, with Sylvan being chosen for the game. On 2 November, Dungeon was elected as the remaining featured faction, beating out Inferno.

== Critical reception ==
Reception

Aggregate score
Aggregator	Score
Metacritic	67/100

Review score
Publication	Score
IGN	6.4/10

Heroes VII received a mixed reception after release, scoring 67/100 on review aggregator site Metacritic. IGN awarded it a score of 6.4 out of 10, saying "Might and Magic Heroes 7 is a loyal but buggy sequel that manages to scratch a very old PC gaming itch."
