= Might and Magic: Heroes Kingdoms =

2009 video game

- Developer: Ubisoft
- Publisher: Ubisoft
- Series: Heroes of Might and Magic
- Platform: Browser
- Release: 3 November 2009 (France)
- Genre: Strategy
- Mode: Multiplayer

Might and Magic: Heroes Kingdoms (originally Heroes of Might and Magic Kingdoms) was a real-time strategy massively multiplayer online game based on the Heroes of Might and Magic series. The game was announced in 2007 with closed betas running until 2009. It was released in France on 3 November 2009. It closed its servers on 1 September 2014.

== Gameplay ==
Might and Magic: Heroes Kingdoms was a real-time strategy massively multiplayer online game played through a web browser.

Different game worlds were available, each of which could hold a limited number of players. Each game world consisted of a tiled map of regions. Players chose a game world to play on and each was given control of a city within one of the regions. Each region was itself made up of a 25 zones (5 by 5 tiles) with the city at the centre. Four of these zones contained mines which provided resources to the city while others were open ground. Each zone in a newly acquired region was populated with an army of non-player character (NPC) troops which had to be defeated before mined resources could be collected or before buildings could be constructed on the open ground.

The city housed a hero character and the player's troops. Structures could be built within the city to enable the hiring of new heroes, the training of additional troops, the researching of spells, and to provide other bonuses. Heroes could lead troops into battle, could improve mines and construct buildings in the zones surrounding a city, and could establish new cities in other regions. They gained experience points from performing these actions and, as they level up, could learn trades and skills to boost their performance in battle or the city's economy.

Players organized themselves into alliances for protection and to obtain the "Tears of Asha" which were required to win the game. Each game lasted approximately 6 months and players could then start a new game and receive bonuses in the new game world based upon their achievements in the previous game world.

The economy of the game required the collection of gold, common resources (ore and wood) and rare resources (mercury, crystals, sulfur and gems). Gold was used to recruit and maintain heroes and troops, and to pay for structures and buildings. Common resources were required to build basic city structures. Rare resources were required for specialist and magical structures and to recruit high-level troops. Since each city had only four mines, other resource-types had to be purchased or looted. Trades could be made with other players or with an NPC merchant. As players established new cities in regions with a different set of four mines, they became increasingly self-sufficient.

Each player was one of five races, Haven, Academy, Necropolis, Inferno, and Sylvan. Each race had different skills in combat and magic and required different rare resources for their respective specialist structures and troops.

== Release ==
=== Asia ===
Ubisoft’s studio producer in Chengdu, Samson Mow, was responsible for the development, launch and operations of Might and Magic: Heroes Kingdoms in China, Taiwan, and Korea.

== Subscription ==
The game was marketed as being free-to-play but non-paying players were limited to three heroes and three towns for the first two months and were then able to recruit one extra hero and build one extra town each month. For a monthly subscription, this limit was removed and other in-game bonuses were made available. Virtual goods were also available.

== Closure ==
On 22 January 2014 the game administration announced that the Might and Magic: Heroes Kingdoms servers would be permanently closing at the end of August 2014. The closing happened on 1 September 2014 and the servers are no longer available for play.
