= Blood Bowl (1995 video game) =

- Developer: Destiny Software Productions
- Publisher: MicroLeague
- Producer: Scott B. Ciancio
- Designer: Jervis Johnson
- Programmer: Michael Hiebert
- Artists: Patrick Arce; Chris Gilbert
- Composer: John Danty
- Series: Blood Bowl
- Platform: MS-DOS
- Release: NA: April 1995; EU: July 1995
- Genres: Turn-based strategy, sports
- Modes: Single-player, multiplayer

Blood Bowl is a 1995 turn-based strategy video game adaptation of the Games Workshop tabletop game of the same name, originally developed for MS-DOS computers by Destiny Software Productions and published by MicroLeague.

== Gameplay ==
Free agency screenshot

The game is a fantasy version of gridiron football, with a violent twist in that opponents can be deliberately seriously injured or killed, and without the ability to kick field goals. Each player is given a set number of action points with which to act. The team that scores the most touchdowns wins. This can be achieved through a throwing and passing game, or alternatively, by beating the opposing team up so badly that scoring becomes easy.

The game features league play in which the player's team competes in the standings and can sign free agents to augment his team or replace killed players.

== Reception ==
Reception

Review scores
| Publication | Score |
|---|---|
| AllGame | 3.5/5 |
| Computer Gaming World | 2.5/5 |
| Next Generation | 2/5 |
| PC Gamer (US) | 71% |
| PC Games | B |

PC Gamer US's Dan Bennett called Blood Bowl "an enjoyable game, as long as you don't think too much about how good it could have been." He criticized the slowness of the game's AI opponent, and the lack of the modem play advertised on Blood Bowl's packaging. However, he concluded, "[F]or fans of the board game, it's a must." In Computer Gaming World, Martin E. Cirulis wrote, "Blood Bowl [...] should have benefited from the vast amount of work that has gone into developing [the sports] genre. Instead, we get strange omissions and difficulties that were ironed out of most football sims years ago."

The game was reviewed in 1995 in Dragon #220 by Paul Murphy in the "Eye of the Monitor" column. Murphy calls the game "a disappointment," then goes on to suggest that readers should "play the board-game: it's better."

Blood Bowl won Computer Game Review's 1995 "Strategy Game of the Year" award, tied with Heroes of Might and Magic: A Strategic Quest and Gazillionaire.

Next Generation reviewed the PC version of the game, rating it two stars out of five, and stated that "This game loses one star for promising modem play it doesn't deliver [...] but it's just what the doctor ordered for the sports or strategy gamer looking for something really different."

The game sold 40,000 copies within three months of its initial release, bringing in over $450,000 USD in revenue, and experienced slowed sales the following year.

== See also ==
- Pigskin 621 A.D.
- Mutant League Football
