= Disney Fantasy Online =

2009 video game

- Developer: Netdragon
- Publisher: Netdragon
- Release: 2009
- Genre: Massively multiplayer online role-playing

Disney Fantasy Online was a massively multiplayer online role-playing game developed by Netdragon marketed in China.

The game is in 2.5D perspective, and features Disney characters such as Mickey Mouse, Minnie Mouse, Donald Duck, and Goofy.

The game ceased operations on March 25, 2016.
