= Enterprise Building (China) =

Chinese building shaped like Star Trek ship

- Interactive map of the Enterprise Building area

General information
- Location: Changle, China
- Coordinates: 25.9630°N 119.6958°E
- Construction started: 2010
- Completed: 2014
- Cost: 600 million yuan (about $97 million c. 2015)
- Owner: NetDragon Websoft

Technical details
- Floor count: 6

The Enterprise Building (simplified Chinese: 企业号; traditional Chinese: 企業號; pinyin: Qǐyè Hào; lit. 'The Enterprise') is the headquarters of the Chinese game developer company NetDragon Websoft. It is located in the Chinese coastal city of Changle, a suburb of Fuzhou in Fujian province. The building resembles Star Trek's Starship Enterprise — specifically, the Enterprise-E featured in several Star Trek films.

== Construction ==
It was sponsored by NetDragon Websoft’s founder Liu Dejian (刘德建), a Chinese millionaire and a fan of the Star Trek show. It was constructed with permission from the show copyright holders and is described as "the only licensed Star Trek building in the world". The construction begun in October 2010 and concluded in May 2014.

== Features ==
The building is 853 feet (260 m) long, 328 feet (100 m) wide, and cost CN¥600,000,000 (Note: US$97,000,000 (equivalent to about $132,000,000 in 2025)) to build. It has six floors. The complex also features a football field, four tennis courts, a swimming pool, horseback riding area, VR experience center and a railway. It also has Star Trek-style sliding doors, as well as parts inspired by the Hui Style architecture.

The building also hosts a life-size replica of a Tyrannosaurus rex skeleton modelled after "Stan".
