= Promethean World =

Global education technologies company

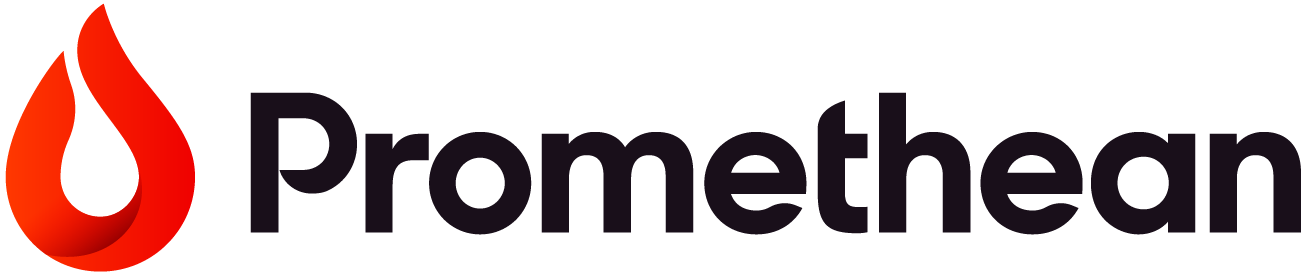
- Type: Subsidiary
- Industry: Education
- Founded: March 1997; 29 years ago
- Headquarters: Atlanta, Georgia
- Key people: Simon Leung, Chairman; Bin Shen CEO
- Products: ActivPanel, ActivInspire, Explain Everything
- Number of employees: 650
- Website: www.prometheanworld.com

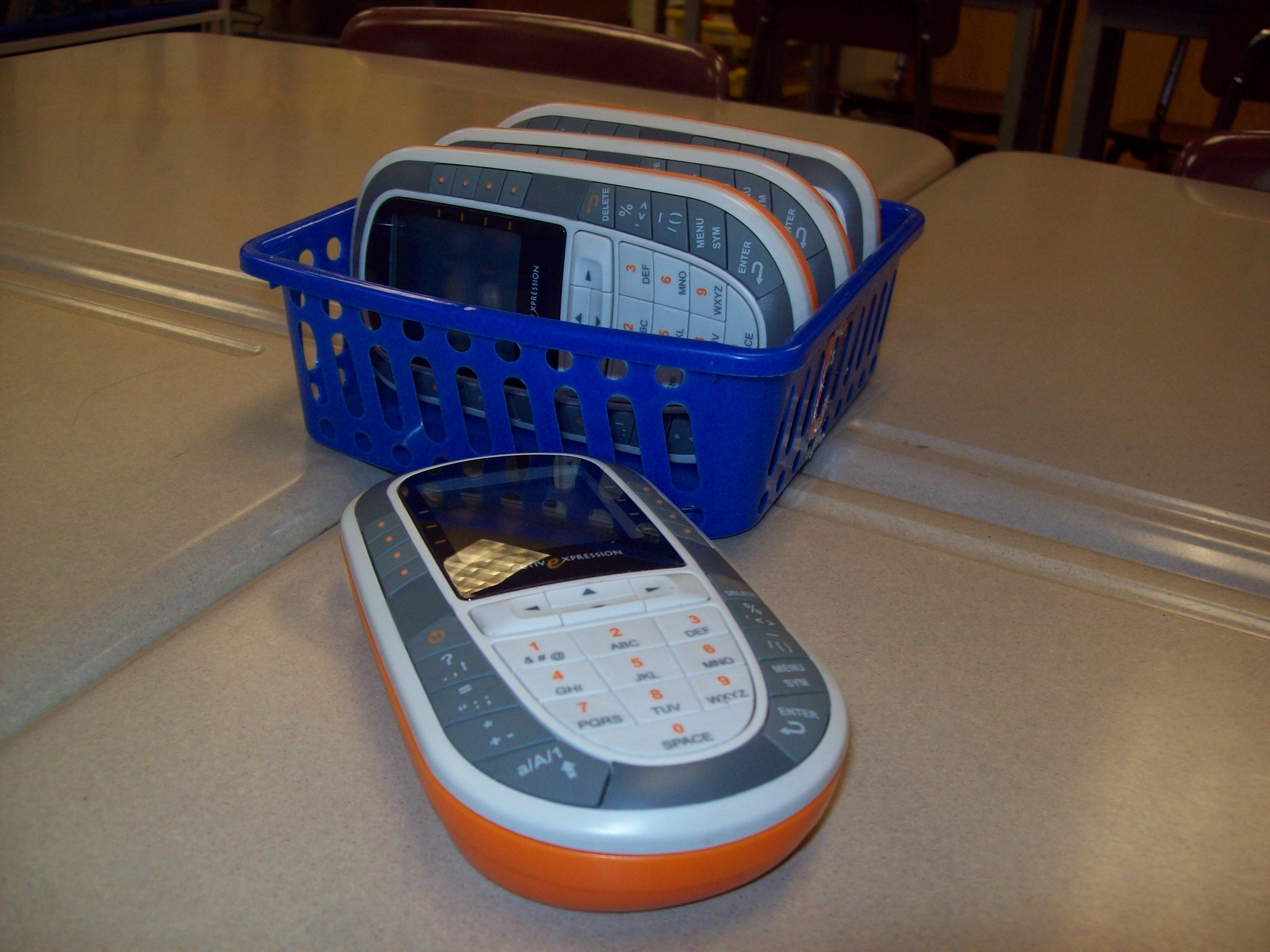
Promethean ActivExpression Classroom Voting Remotes

Promethean World Ltd is a global education technologies company that makes digital whiteboards and other products. Founded in 1997, it was acquired in 2015 by NetDragon Websoft, a Chinese video game company. The company is headquartered in Atlanta, with offices Clitheroe, England.

== History ==
Tony Cann founded Promethean in Blackburn in 1996 and the following year launched PandA software, the forerunner to the ActivStudio and ActivPrimary software tools for company presentations and meetings. Promethean initially sold U.S.-made Quora interactive whiteboards, before designing and building their own at the Blackburn facility.

Cann was replaced by Graham Howe as chairman in July 2005. James Marshall became CEO in September 2012, replacing Jean-Yves Charlier. The company was the subject of an initial public offering on the London Stock Exchange in March 2010.

In May 2014, Graham Howe stood down as chairman, and was replaced by Philip Rowley. In July 2015, NetDragon announced that it had agreed to buy the company. In September 2015, Promethean acquired touch and gesture technology from Light Blue Optics for an undisclosed sum.
