= Simple DirectMedia Layer =

Free software multimedia library

- Original author: Sam Lantinga
- Developer: SDL Community
- Release: 1998; 28 years ago
- Stable release: 3.4.20 / 3 November 2026; 5 days ago 2.32.0 / 8 February 2025; 21 months ago
- Written in: C
- Operating system: OpenHarmony / HarmonyOS and same (current) platforms as version 2, such as 32- and 64-bit Windows XP+ and 64-bit macOS 10.7+ (support dropped for outdated e.g. Windows Phone/UWP). Support for version 2: Linux (e.g. SteamOS), Windows, macOS 10.4+, iOS 3.1.3+, tvOS, Android 2.3.3+, FreeBSD 8.4+, Nintendo Switch, PlayStation 2, Haiku, RISC OS 3.5+, MorphOS 0.4+ Additionally before v2.0.0: e.g. AmigaOS and MorphOS, and consoles (PlayStation, Xbox, Wii, etc), Nintendo DS
- Platform: IA-32 (x86), x86-64, PowerPC, AArch64
- Type: API
- License: zlib License; Before 2.0.0: GNU LGPL
- Website: www.libsdl.org
- Repository: github.com/libsdl-org/SDL

Simple DirectMedia Layer (SDL) is a cross-platform software development library designed to provide a hardware abstraction layer for computer multimedia hardware components. Software developers can use it to write high-performance computer games and other multimedia applications that can run on many operating systems such as AmigaOS, Android, iOS, Linux, MorphOS, macOS, and Windows.

SDL manages video, audio, input devices, threads, shared object loading, computer networking and timers. For 3D graphics, it can handle an OpenGL, Vulkan, Metal, or Direct3D12 (older Direct3D versions 11 and 9 are also supported) context. A common misconception is that SDL is a game engine. However, the library is suited to building games directly, or is usable indirectly by engines built on top of it.

The library is internally written in C and possibly, depending on the target platform, C++ or Objective-C, and provides the application programming interface in C, with bindings to other languages available. It is free and open-source software subject to the requirements of the zlib License since version 2.0, and with prior versions subject to the GNU Lesser General Public License. Under the zlib License, SDL 2.0 is freely available for static linking in closed-source projects, unlike SDL 1.2, although it is possible for the user to override the statically linked library with one provided by them. SDL 2.0, released in 2013, was a major departure from previous versions, offering more opportunity for 3D hardware acceleration, but breaking backwards-compatibility; a wrapper library made to translate 1.2 calls to 2.0 was later made available.

SDL is extensively used in the industry in both large and small projects. By 2010, over 700 games, 180 applications, and 120 demos had been posted on the library website.

SDL supports Emscripten (i.e. programs that run on a web page).

SDL 3 was released, as a stable version, in January 2025. It has a migration guide, and Coccinelle tool support to help migrate to the new major version. SDL 3 has a new way to control the entry point of your program, and you can optionally control execution in a non-framework way.

== History ==
Sam Lantinga created the library, first releasing it in early 1998, while working for Loki Software. He got the idea while porting a Windows application to Macintosh. He then used SDL to port Doom to BeOS (see Doom source ports). Around the time of its creation, SDL was regarded as a simple alternative to DirectX. Several other free libraries were developed to work alongside SDL, such as SMPEG and OpenAL. He also founded Galaxy Gameworks in 2008 to help commercially support SDL, although the company plans are currently on hold due to time constraints.

Soon after putting Galaxy Gameworks on hold, Lantinga announced that SDL 1.3 (which would then later become SDL 2.0) would be licensed under the zlib License. Lantinga announced SDL 2.0 on 14 July 2012, at the same time announcing that he was joining Valve, the first version of which was announced the same day he joined the company. Lantinga announced the stable release of SDL 2.0.0 on 13 August 2013.

SDL 2.0 is a major update to the SDL 1.2 codebase with a different, not backwards-compatible API. It replaces several parts of the 1.2 API with more general support for multiple input and output options. Some feature additions include multiple window support, hardware-accelerated 2D graphics, and better Unicode support.

Support for Mir and Wayland was added in SDL 2.0.2 and enabled by default in SDL 2.0.4. Version 2.0.4 also provided better support for Android.

In 2024, the stable preview of SDL 3.1.3 was released (and in January 2025 3.2.0 was released as stable). It makes the API more consistent and allows access to more parts of the device, along with other features.

== Software architecture ==
SDL is a wrapper around the operating-system-specific functions that the program needs to access. The only purpose of SDL is to provide a common framework for accessing these functions for multiple operating systems (cross-platform). SDL provides support for 2D pixel operations, sound, file access, event handling, timing and threading. It is often used to complement OpenGL by setting up the graphical output and providing mouse and keyboard input, since OpenGL comprises only rendering.

A game using the Simple DirectMedia Layer will not automatically run on every operating system; further adaptations must be applied. These are reduced to a minimum, since SDL also contains a few abstraction APIs for frequent functions offered by an operating system.

The syntax of SDL is function-based: all operations done in SDL are done by passing parameters to subroutines (functions). Special structures are also used to store the specific information SDL needs to handle. SDL functions are categorized under several different subsystems.

=== Subsystems ===
SDL is divided into several subsystems:

Basics
Initialization and Shutdown, Configuration Variables, Error Handling, Log Handling
Video
Display and Window Management, surface functions, rendering acceleration, etc.
Input Events
Event handling, Support for Keyboard, Mouse, Joystick and Game controller
Force Feedback
SDL_haptic.h implements support for "Force Feedback"
Audio
SDL_audio.h implements Audio Device Management, Playing and Recording
Threads
multi-threading: Thread Management, Thread Synchronization Primitives, Atomic Operations
Timers
Timer Support
File Abstraction
Filesystem Paths, File I/O Abstraction
Shared Object Support
Shared Object Loading and Function Lookup
Platform and CPU Information
Platform Detection, CPU Feature Detection, Byte Order and Byte Swapping, Bit Manipulation
Power Management
Power Management Status
Additional
Platform-specific functionality

Besides this basic, low-level support, there also are a few separate official libraries that provide some more functions. These comprise the "standard library", and are provided on the official website and included in the official documentation:

- SDL_image — support for multiple image formats
- SDL_mixer — complex audio functions, mainly for sound mixing
- SDL_net — networking support
- SDL_ttf — TrueType font rendering support
- SDL_shadercross — shader format translation (such as from SPIR-V to HLSL); intended for use with SDL's GPU API.
- SDL_rtf — simple Rich Text Format rendering
- SDL_native_midi — support for MIDI playback
- SDL_gesture — ‘$1 Unistroke’ gesture recognition

Other, non-standard libraries also exist. For example: SDL_Collide on SourceForge created by Amir Taaki.

=== Language bindings ===
The SDL 2.0 library has language bindings for:

- Ada
- Beef
- C
- C++
- C#
- Common Lisp
- D
- Erlang
- Fortran
- Gambas
- Go
- Haskell
- Java (e.g. JSDL)
- Julia
- Lua
- Nim
- OCaml
- Pascal
- Perl (via SDL)
- PHP
- Python (several, e.g. pygame_sdl2 and sdl2hl)
- Raku
- Rust
- Vala

=== Supported back-ends ===
Abstraction layers of several SDL platforms

Because of the way SDL is designed, much of its source code is split into separate modules for each operating system, to make calls to the underlying system. When SDL is compiled, the appropriate modules are selected for the target system. The following back-ends are available:

- GDI back-end for Microsoft Windows.
- DirectX back-end; older SDL 1.2 uses DirectX 7 by default, while 2.0 defaults to DirectX 9 and can access up to DirectX 12.
- Quartz back-end for macOS (dropped in 2.0).
- Metal back-end for macOS / iOS / tvOS since 2.0.8; older versions use OpenGL by default.
- Xlib back-end for X11-based windowing system on various operating systems.
- OpenGL contexts on various platforms.
- EGL back-end when used in conjunction with Wayland-based windowing system., Raspberry Pi and other systems.
- Vulkan contexts on platforms that support it.
- sceGu back-end, a Sony OpenGL-like backend native to the PSP.

An unofficial Sixel back-end is available for SDL 1.2.

The Rockbox MP3 player firmware also distributes a version of SDL 1.2, which is used to run games such as Quake.

== Reception and adoption ==
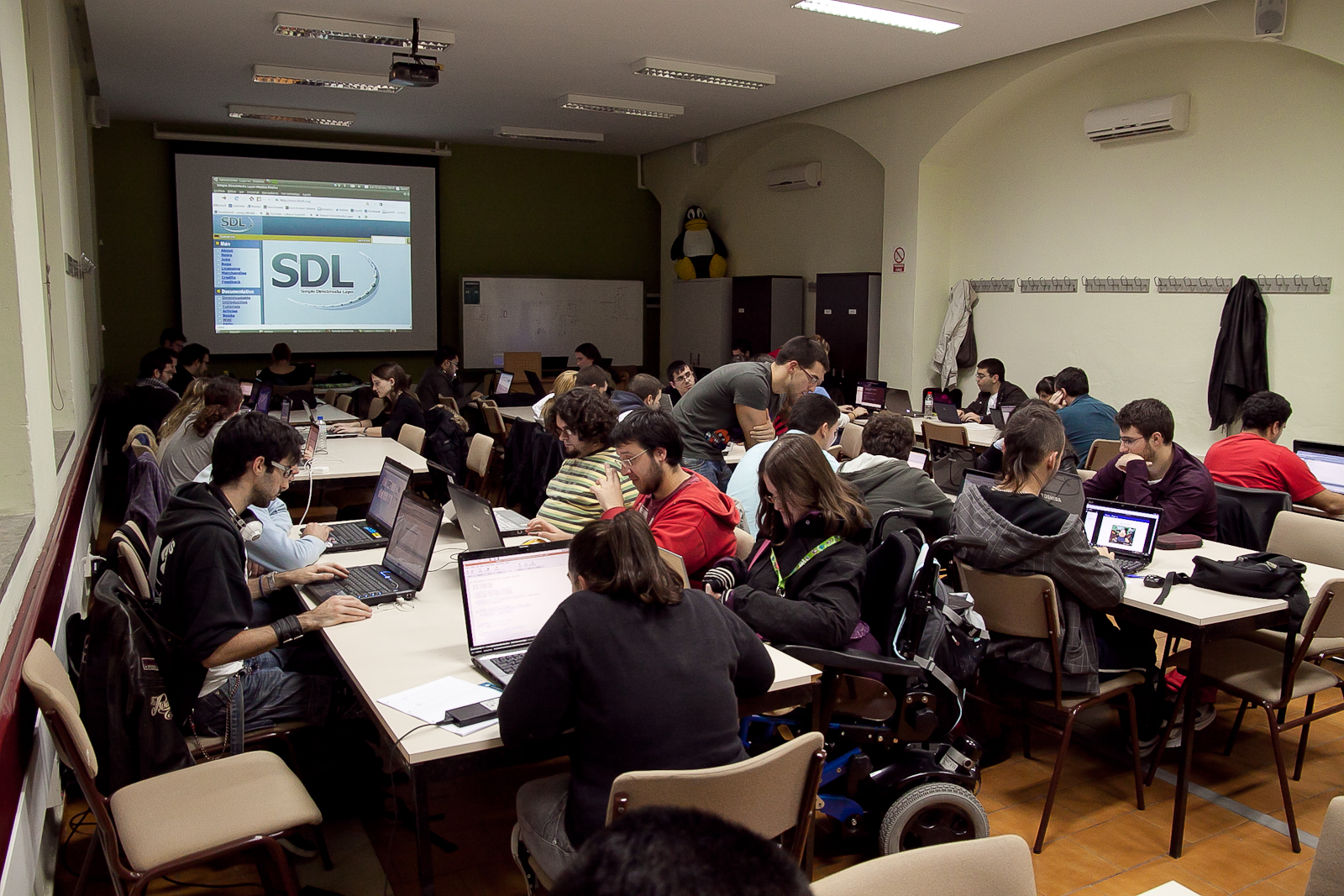
Workshop on SDL, University of Cádiz (2010)

Over the years SDL was used for many commercial and non-commercial video game projects. For instance, MobyGames listed 120 games using SDL in 2013, and the SDL website itself listed around 700 games in 2012. Important commercial examples are Angry Birds, Unreal Tournament, and games developed using Valve's Source Engine, which uses SDL extensively for cross-platform compatibility; ones from the open-source domain are OpenTTD, The Battle for Wesnoth or Freeciv.

The cross-platform game releases of the popular Humble Indie Bundles for Linux, Mac and Android are often SDL-based.

SDL is also often used for later ports on new platforms with legacy code. For instance, the PC game Homeworld was ported to the Pandora handheld and Jagged Alliance 2 for Android via SDL.

Also, several non video game programs use SDL; examples are the emulators, such as DOSBox, FUSE ZX Spectrum emulator and VisualBoyAdvance.

There were several books written for development with SDL (see further reading).

SDL is used in university courses teaching multimedia and computer science, for instance, in a workshop about game programming using libSDL at the University of Cadiz in 2010, or a Game Design discipline at UTFPR (Ponta Grossa campus) in 2015.

=== Video game examples using SDL ===
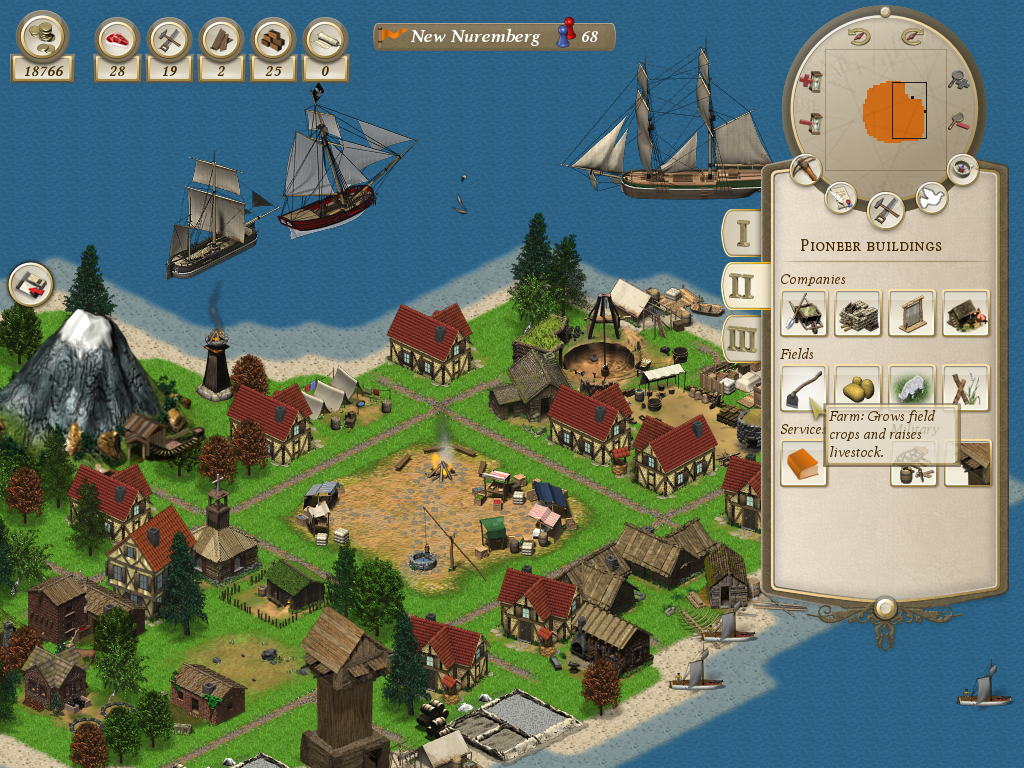
Unknown Horizons

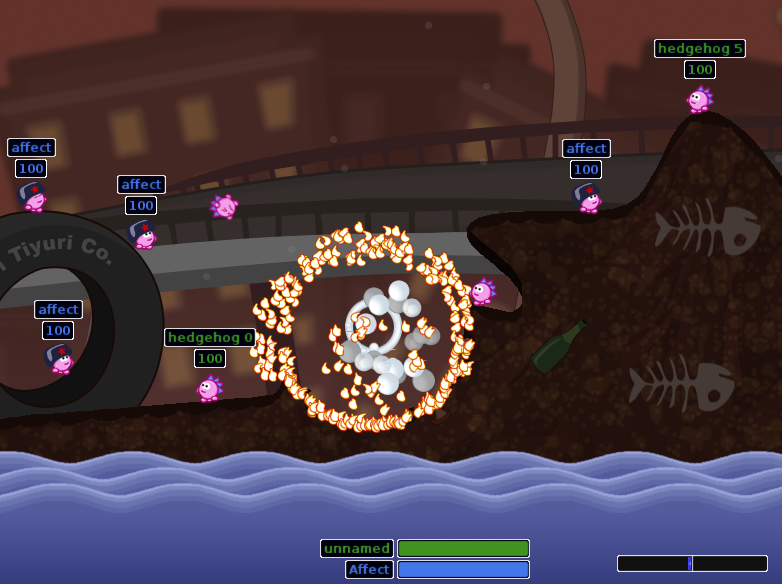
Hedgewars

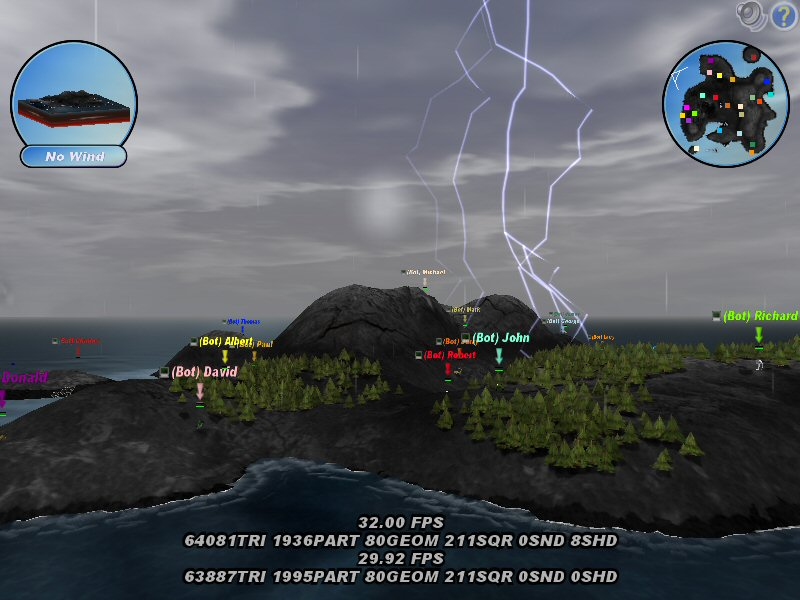
Scorched 3D

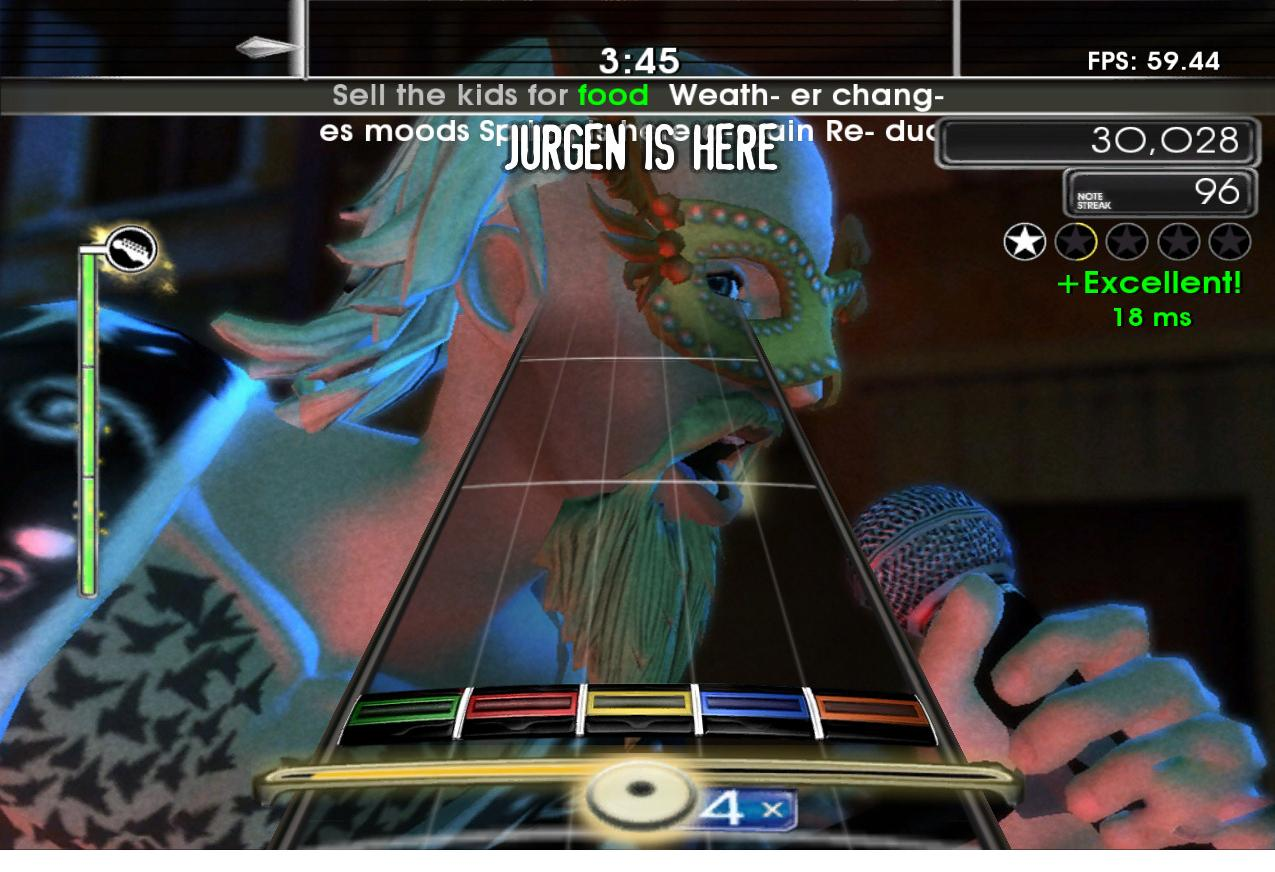
Frets on Fire

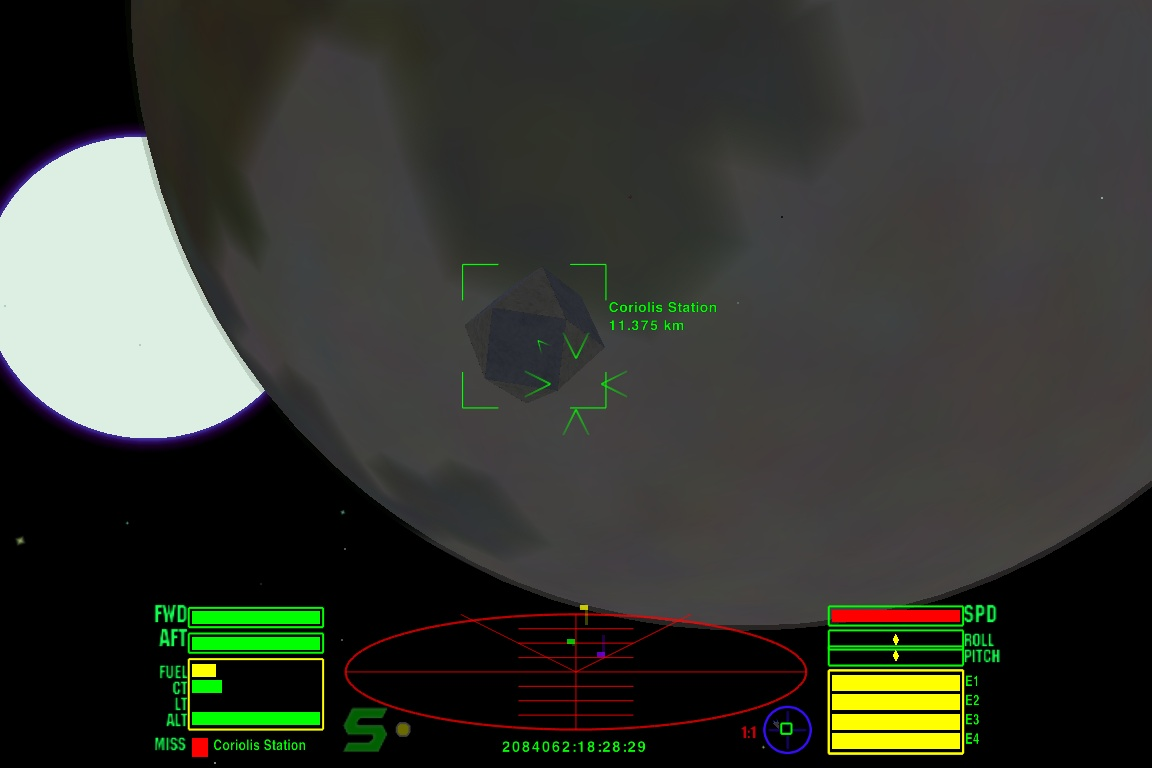
Oolite

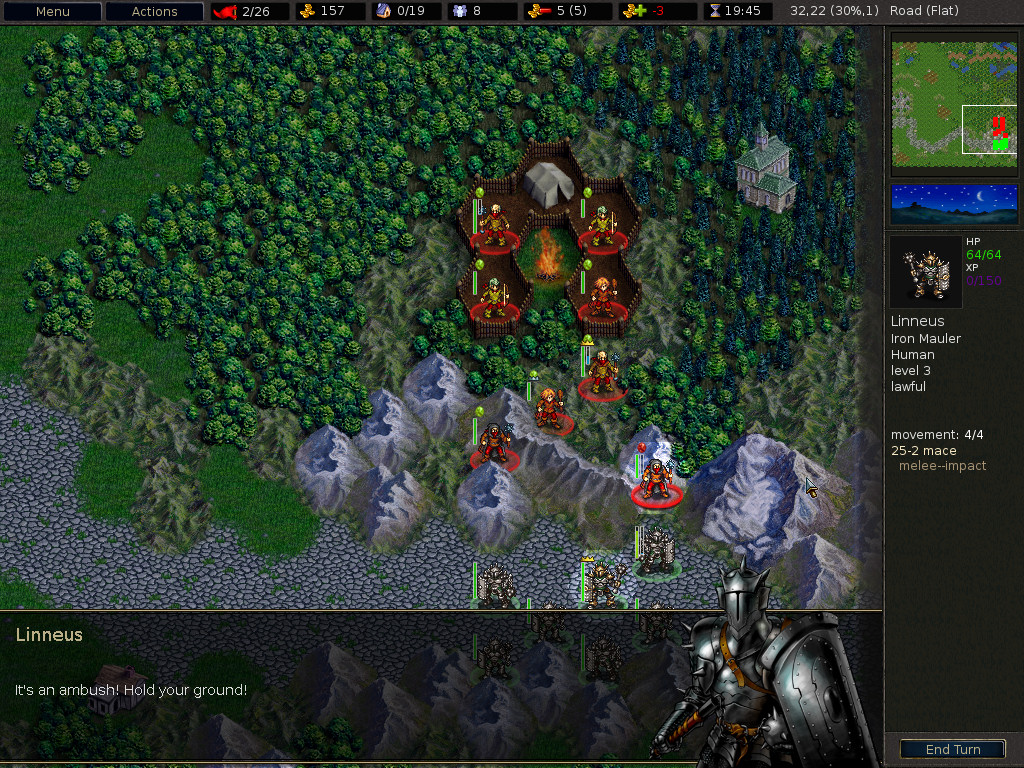
The Battle for Wesnoth

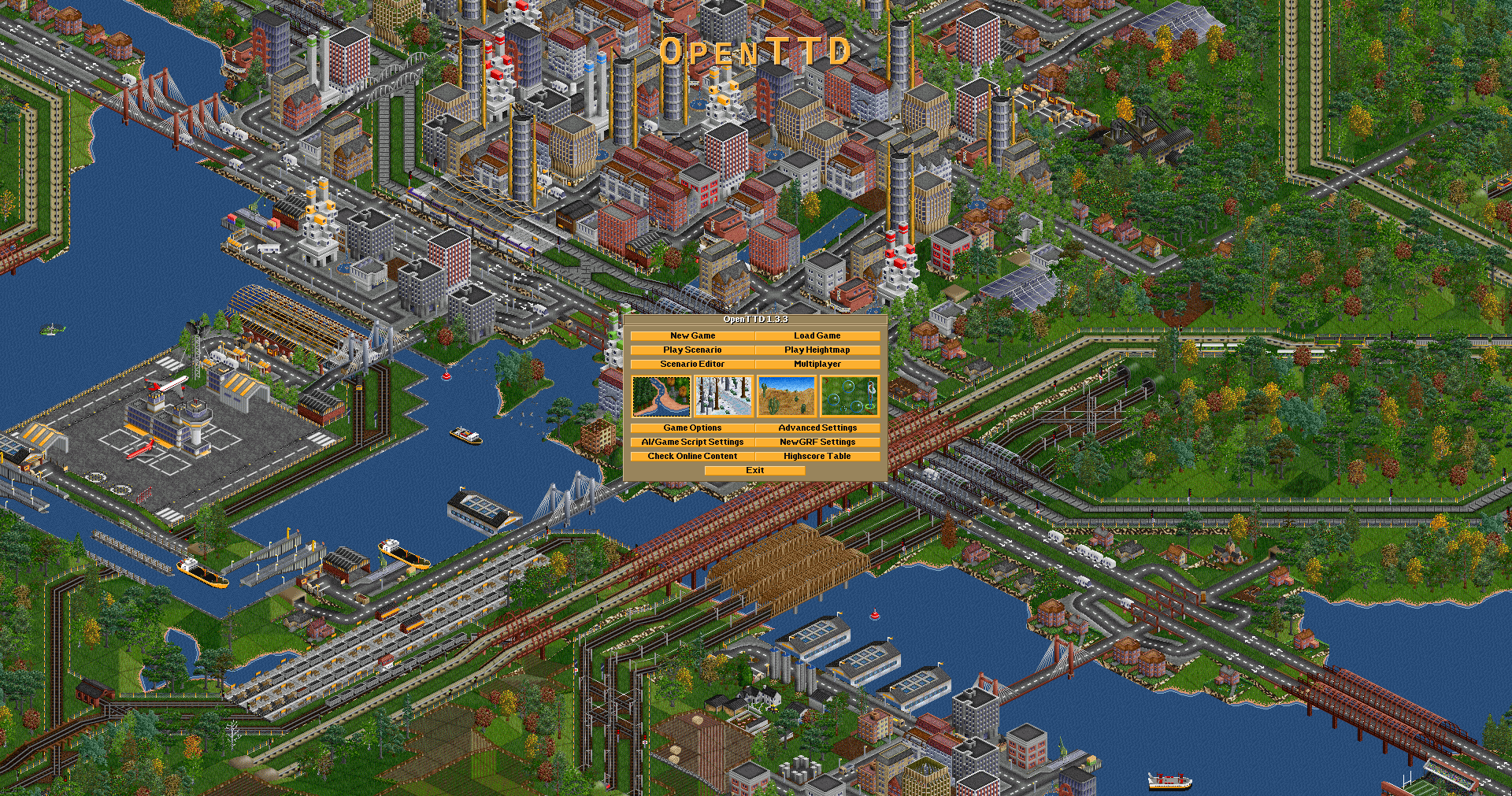
OpenTTD

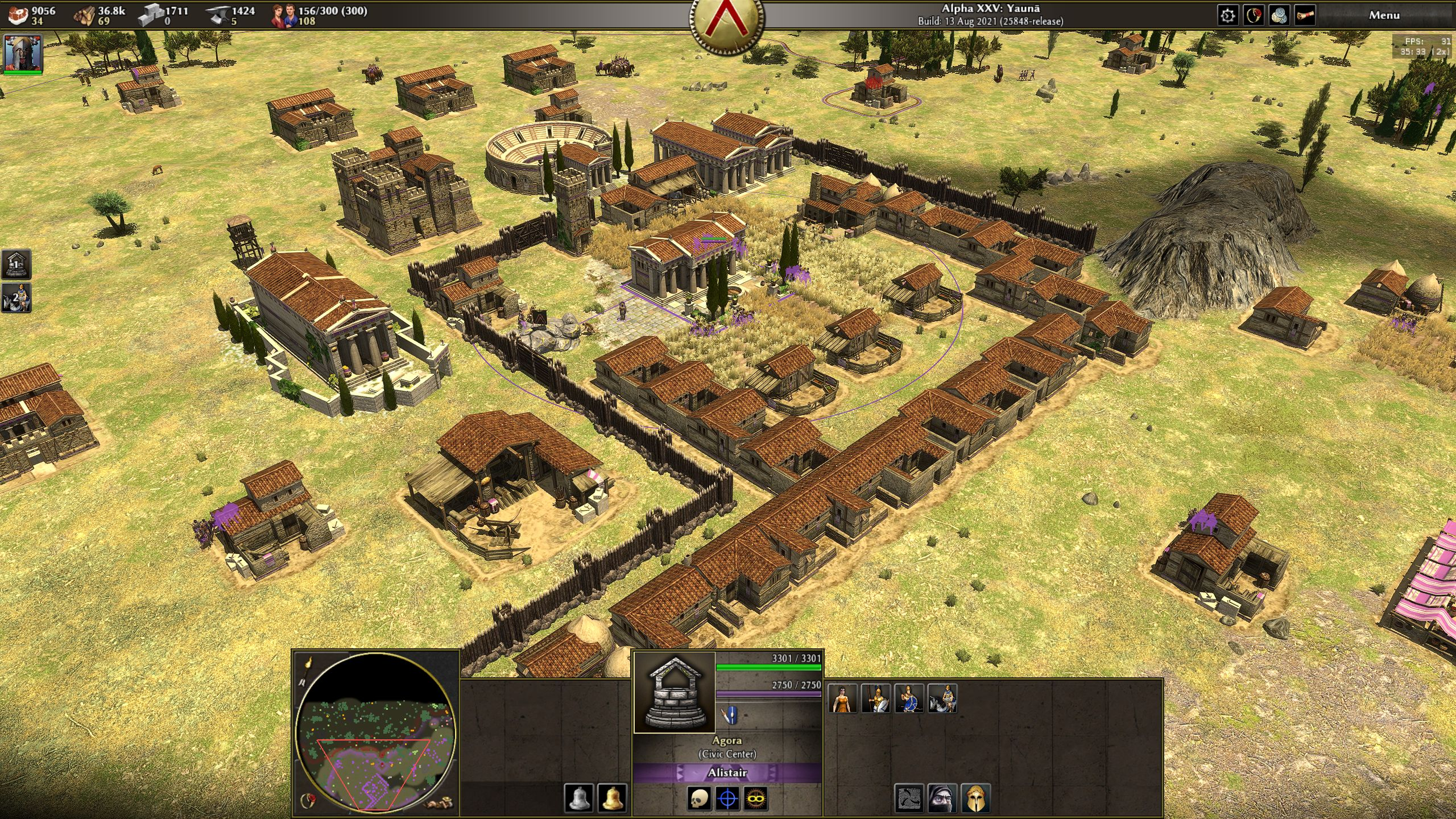
0 A.D.

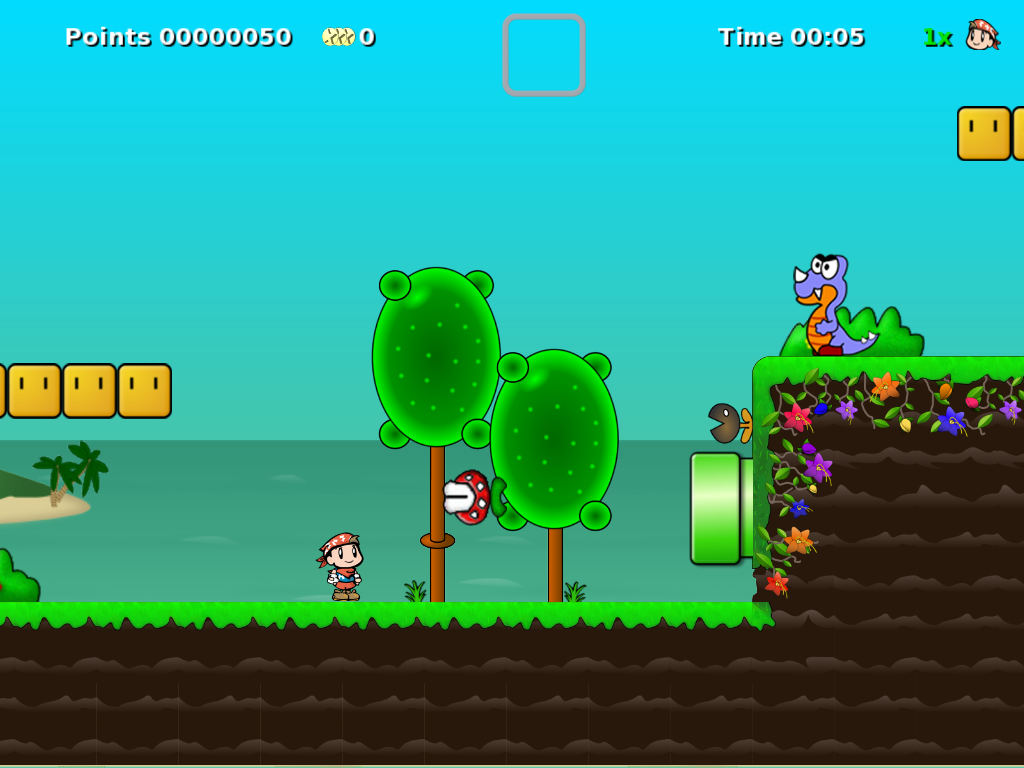
Secret Maryo Chronicles

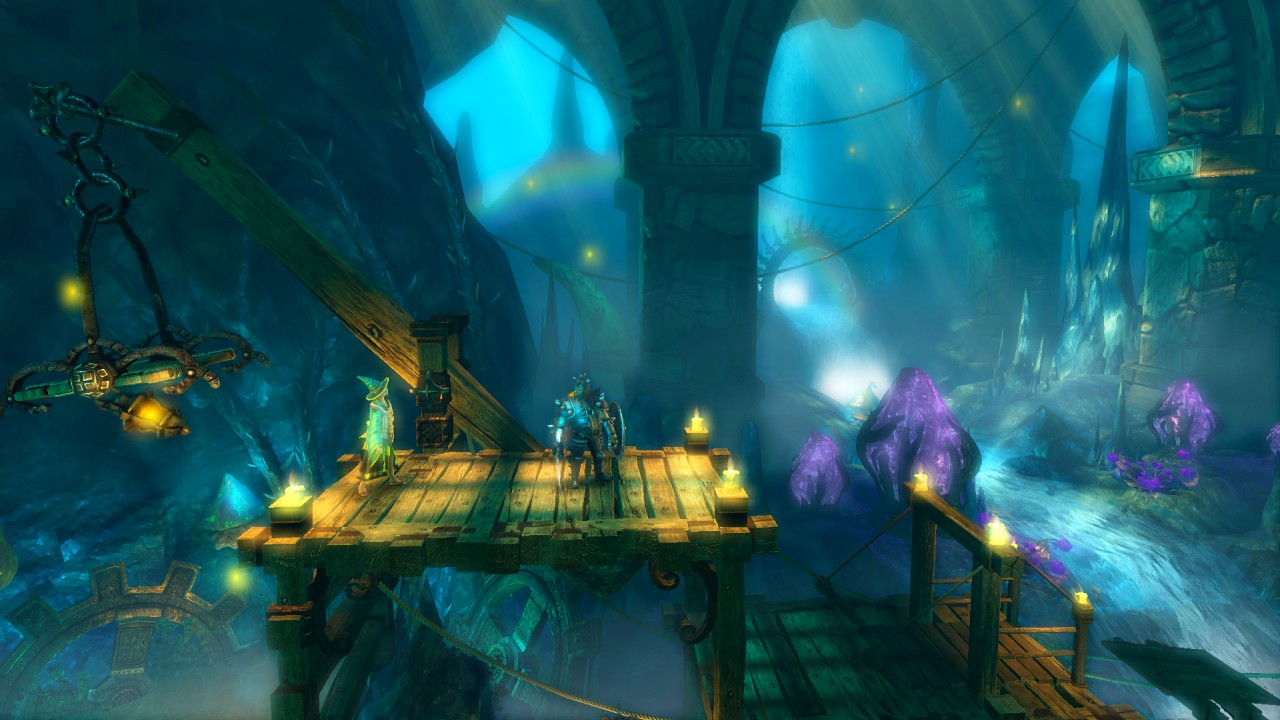
Trine

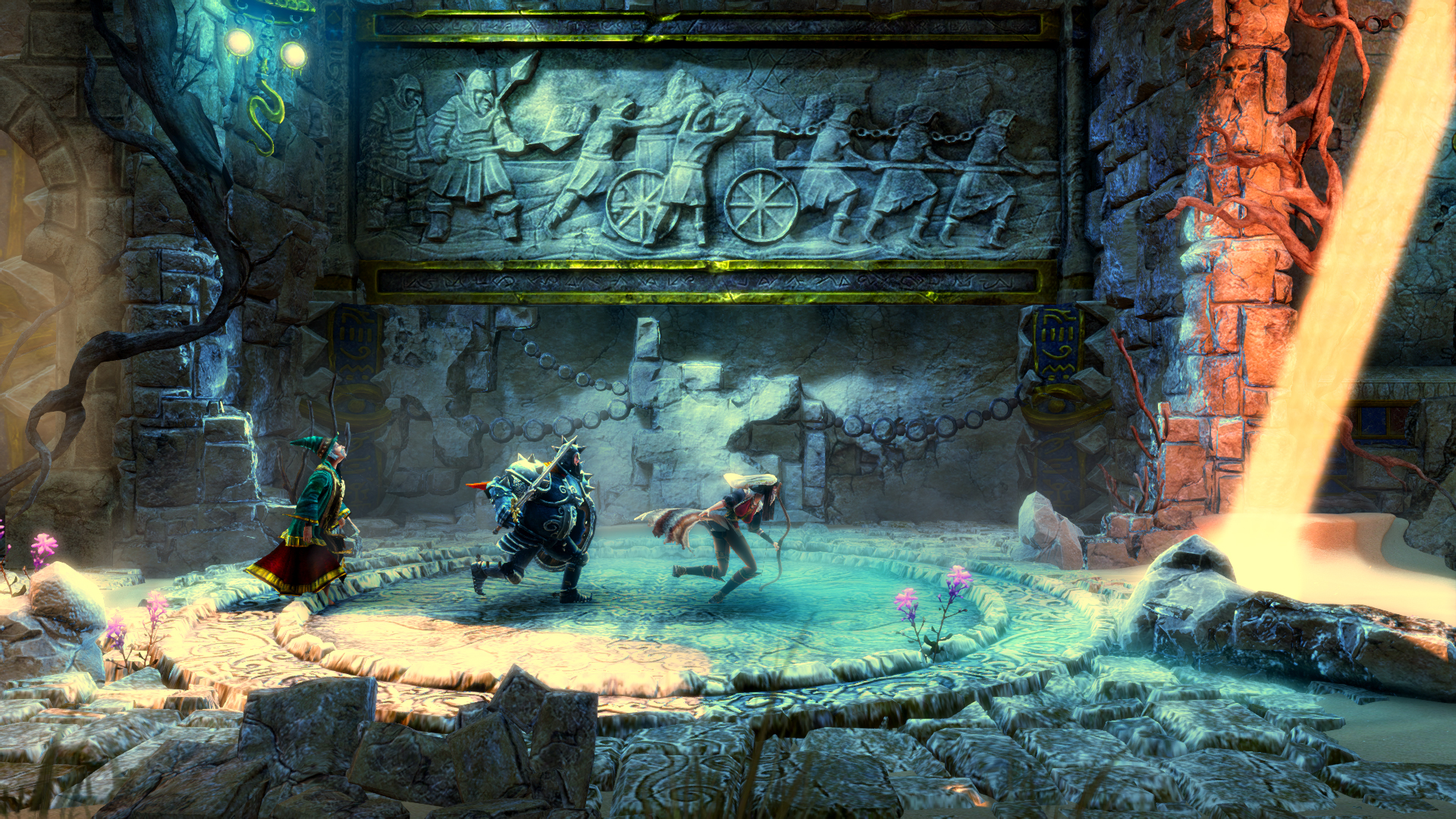
Trine 2

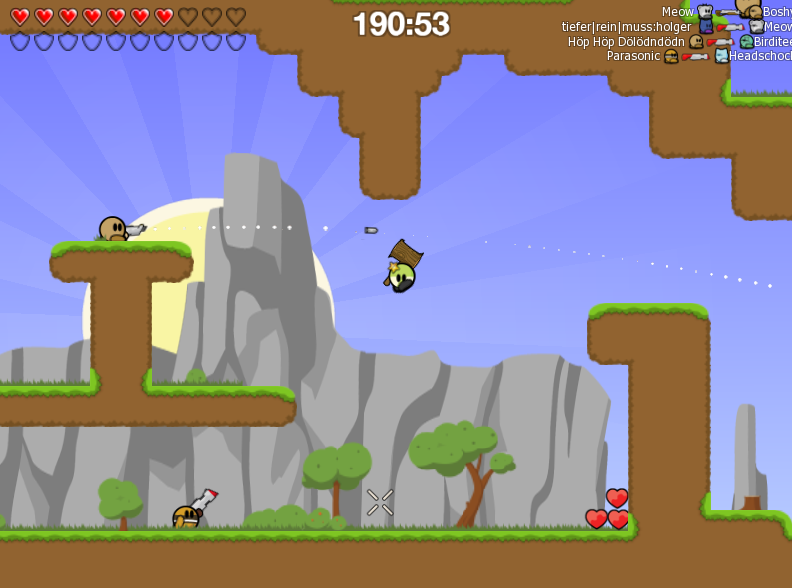
Teeworlds

== See also ==
- Allegro
- ClanLib
- Cross-platform support middleware
- DirectFB
- General Graphics Interface
- GLFW
- OpenML
- Pygame
- Raylib
- Ren'Py
- SFML
- SVGAlib
