= 91 Wireless =

91 Wireless was one of China's largest app stores for Android. 91 Wireless claimed that more than 12.9 billion apps had been downloaded from its markets. Its platform included the products 91 Assistant and HiMarket. It was acquired in 2013 by Baidu for $1.9b.
