= Heroes of Might and Magic: A Strategic Quest =

1995 video game

- PC box cover
- Developer: New World Computing
- Publisher: New World Computing
- Designer: Jon Van Caneghem
- Programmer: Phil Steinmeyer
- Artist: Julia Ulano
- Composers: Paul Romero; Rob King
- Series: Heroes of Might and Magic
- Platforms: DOS, Windows, Mac OS
- Release: DOS; September 1995; Windows; February 1996
- Genre: Turn-based strategy
- Modes: Single-player, multiplayer

Heroes of Might and Magic: A Strategic Quest is a 1995 turn-based strategy game developed and published by New World Computing for DOS. A spin-off of New World Computing's Might and Magic series of role-playing video games, the success of Heroes of Might and Magic led to a number of sequels.

In 1996, NWC released an updated version of the game for Windows 95. This new version included a map editor, random map generator, CD audio, and new scenarios. As a bonus, King's Bounty was also included on the CD.

== Story ==
Heroes of Might and Magic tells the story of Lord Morglin Ironfist, who is forced to flee his homeworld of Varn (the setting of the first Might and Magic game) through a magical portal, because his cousin Ragnar has usurped the throne after his uncle, Ragnar's father, killed Morglin's father, the legitimate ruler.

He finds himself along with his few followers in a strange and uncharted land, called Enroth. The land is unruled but contested by Ironfist and three other warlords: the barbarian Lord Slayer, the sorceress Queen Lamanda, and the warlock Lord Alamar.

In the canonical storyline, Lord Ironfist, leader of the knight faction, defeats his three opponents and founds a new kingdom in Enroth. It is possible for the player to lead the other factions to victory, however this is not reflected in the following games of the Heroes of Might and Magic series.

== Gameplay ==
Heroes of Might and Magic takes place in a medieval fantasy world filled with creatures frequently associated with myth and legend. These creatures compose the military forces (troops) with which the player attempts to conquer opponents. The player leads generals through the game world at the head of armies of troops. These generals, called "heroes," provide a means to explore, attack, defeat, and acquire, the four basic principles in the game. The ultimate goal of the game is usually to capture all enemy castles and defeat all enemy heroes. However, the game comes with many different play scenarios, and some of these scenarios have unique victory conditions, such as accumulating a certain amount of gold, or finding a particular artifact.

There are four different classes of heroes and castles, each with their own units and strengths/weaknesses. The two "might" classes, Knight and Barbarian, earn skill points in attack or defense more often than in spell power or knowledge. The two "magic" classes, Sorceress and Warlock, earn skill points in spell power or knowledge more often than in attack or defense. There is also a neutral, "wandering" class of troops, including Rogues, Nomads, Ghosts (the only one that cannot be hired) and Genies.

== Development ==
Heroes of Might and Magic was first released near the end of September 1995.

== Reception ==
Reception

Review scores
Publication	Score
Computer Gaming World	5/5
Next Generation	4/5
PC Gamer (US)	88%
MacUser	4/5
Arcane	7/10
Electronic Entertainment	A
Computer Game Review	89/92/91

Awards
Publication	Award
Computer Gaming World	Strategy Game of the Year (tied)
PC Gamer US	Best Strategy Game (nominated)
Computer Games Strategy Plus	Best Turn-Based Strategy Game (tied)
Inside Mac Games	Role-Playing Game of the Year 1996

In mid-November 1995, New World Computing reported that Heroes of Might and Magic had shipped 100,000 copies to retailers and that sell-through was strong. The company announced that the game was "set to top the 100,000 mark in unit sales". By October 1997, the combined sales of Heroes of Might and Magic, Heroes II and The Price of Loyalty expansion had surpassed 500,000 copies. The series as a whole sold 1.5 million copies by December 1999.

Andy Butcher reviewed Heroes of Might and Magic for Arcane magazine, rating it a 7 out of 10 overall. Butcher comments that "Its very simplicity, although ultimately limiting, is appealing, and the computer opponents are far from easy to beat. In terms of depth and long-term interest it's not a real challenger to MicroProse's Master of Magic, which it resembles, but it is a whole lot simpler to get into."

A reviewer for Next Generation assessed that "Heroes of Might and Magic is part wargame, part adventure, and part sim. It seamlessly captures the best of all three genres, and presents the whole package with bright, colorful visuals." He further applauded the game for being "easy to learn, but difficult to master" and having great longevity. He scored it four out of five stars. In Australian Realms, Nick Leaning positively commented upon the game's replayability and design. GameSpot rated the game's production values as somewhat below par, and regarded the story as being thin. Nonetheless, the game was complimented for its gameplay, and received a 7.5 out of 10 overall. It received a Golden Triad Award from Computer Game Review.

Heroes of Might and Magic was named 1995's best turn-based strategy game by Computer Games Strategy Plus—tied with Jagged Alliance—and best overall strategy title by Computer Game Review and Computer Gaming World, tied variously with Command & Conquer, Gazillionaire and Blood Bowl. Similarly, PC Gamer US nominated Heroes for its 1995 "Best Strategy Game" award, although this prize went instead to Command & Conquer. The editors of Computer Gaming World wrote, "Heroes will challenge you to think and plan, and it will reward you with hours of sheer pleasure. It is one of the most addictive games to come along in years."

In 1996, Computer Gaming World declared Heroes of Might and Magic the 133rd-best computer game ever released. The editors called it "a brilliantly balanced game of fantasy combat".
