= Heroes of Might and Magic =

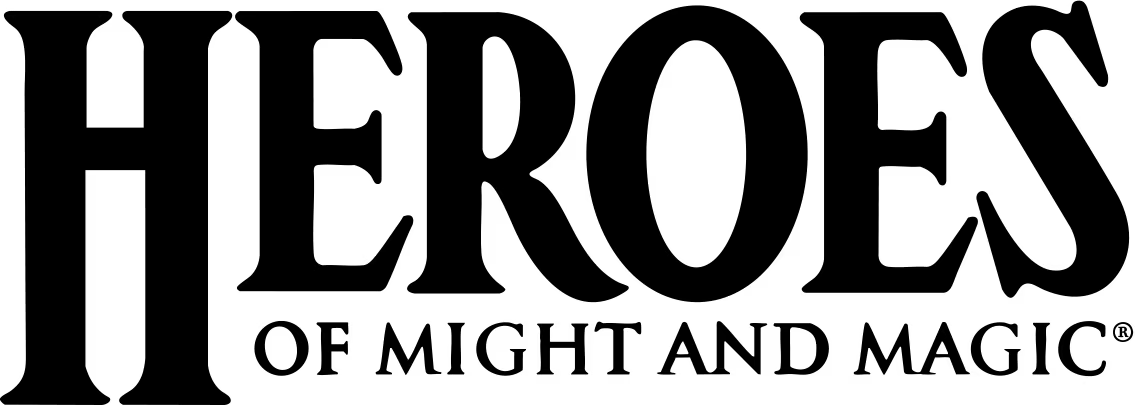
- Genre: Turn-based strategy
- Developers: New World Computing (1995–2003); Nival Interactive (for Heroes V); Black Hole Entertainment (for Heroes VI); Limbic Entertainment (for Heroes VI and VII); Virtuos (for Shades of Darkness); Unfrozen (for Olden Era); Ubisoft (for Heroes III Remake)
- Publishers: New World Computing (1995–1996); The 3DO Company (1996–2003); Ubisoft (2003–); Hooded Horse (for Olden Era)
- Creator: Jon Van Caneghem
- Platforms: MS-DOS, Windows, Mac OS, RISC OS, Linux, Game Boy Color, iOS, Android
- First release: Heroes of Might and Magic; 1995
- Latest release: Heroes of Might and Magic: Olden Era; 2026
- Parent series: Might and Magic
- Spin-offs: List

Heroes of Might and Magic (sometimes abbreviated HoMM), known as Might & Magic Heroes from 2011 to 2024, is a series of video games created and developed by Jon Van Caneghem through New World Computing.

As part of the Might and Magic franchise, the series changed ownership when NWC was acquired by The 3DO Company and again when 3DO closed down and sold the rights to Ubisoft. The games feature turn-based, fantasy-themed conflicts in which players control armies of mythical creatures. The series began in 1995 with the release of the first title. A seventh installment, Might & Magic Heroes VII, was released on September 29, 2015.

New World Computing closed after the production of Heroes of Might and Magic IV, and since then the rights to the franchise have been owned by Ubisoft. Nival Interactive developed the first game in the series since the changeover, Heroes of Might and Magic V. Black Hole Entertainment developed its sequel Might & Magic Heroes VI, but Limbic Entertainment developed later patches and the DLC for it, while Virtuos developed the Shades of Darkness standalone expansion for Heroes VI. Limbic Entertainment developed its sequel, Might & Magic Heroes VII. Olden Era was released in 2026, developed by Unfrozen, and was published by both Ubisoft and Hooded Horse.

The early games were initially released for MS-DOS, then later Microsoft Windows, with sporadic support for Mac. Heroes II was ported to RISC OS, and Heroes III was ported to Linux. GameTap carried the first four games in the series beginning in 2006. Remakes of the first two games were released for the Game Boy Color. The 2015 remake Heroes of Might and Magic III: HD Edition, a remaster of Heroes of Might and Magic III, was ported to iOS and Android, the first time the series was supported on mobile.

== Games ==
Release timeline
1995	Heroes of Might and Magic
1996	Heroes of Might and Magic II
1997
1998
1999	Heroes of Might and Magic III
2000
2001
2002	Heroes of Might and Magic IV
2003
2004
2005
2006	Heroes of Might and Magic V
2007
2008
2009
2010
2011	Might & Magic Heroes VI
2012
2013
2014
2015	Might & Magic Heroes VII
2016
2017
2018
2019
2020
2021
2022
2023
2024
2025
2026	Heroes of Might and Magic: Olden Era
2027	Heroes of Might and Magic III Remake

=== Precursors ===
King's Bounty, produced by New World Computing in 1990, largely anticipated the design of Heroes and is included in some Heroes anthologies as the series forerunner. It was remade for the PlayStation 2 in 2001 under the new title Heroes of Might and Magic: Quest for the Dragon Bone Staff. Multiple sequels to King's Bounty unrelated to the Heroes series have been released by 1C Company starting in 2008 with King's Bounty: The Legend.

The release of the first Heroes of Might and Magic was preceded by the first five entries in the Might and Magic series, but Heroes took place on the planet Enroth, which had not been featured in the parent series at the time. The sixth through eighth Might and Magic games were also set on Enroth and featured storylines overlapping or connecting with the first three Heroes titles. Heroes IV and Might and Magic IX are both set on the planet Axeoth, following Enroth's destruction, but their storylines are independent of each other.

=== Main series ===
Screenshot from Heroes of Might and Magic II

Screenshot from Heroes of Might and Magic V

- Heroes of Might and Magic: A Strategic Quest (1995)
- Heroes of Might and Magic II: The Succession Wars (1996)
  - The Price of Loyalty (1997), expansion
- Heroes of Might and Magic III: The Restoration of Erathia (1999)
  - Armageddon's Blade (1999), expansion
  - The Shadow of Death (2000), expansion
  - Heroes Chronicles (2000-2001), additional campaigns released individually
  - Remake (2027)
- Heroes of Might and Magic IV (2002)
  - The Gathering Storm (2002), expansion
  - Winds of War (2003), expansion
- Heroes of Might and Magic V (2006)
  - Hammers of Fate (2006), expansion
  - Tribes of the East (2007), expansion
- Might & Magic Heroes VI (2011)
  - Pirates of the Savage Sea Adventure (2012), free DLC
  - Danse Macabre (2012), free DLC
  - Shades of Darkness (2013), expansion
- Might & Magic Heroes VII (2015)
  - Lost Tales of Axeoth: Unity (2016), DLC
  - Lost Tales of Axeoth: Every Dog Has His Day (2016), DLC
  - Trial by Fire (2016), expansion
- Heroes of Might and Magic: Olden Era (2026)

=== Portable games ===
- Heroes of Might and Magic (Game Boy Color, 2000)
- Heroes of Might and Magic II (Game Boy Color, 2000)

=== Online games ===
- Heroes of Might and Magic Online (MMO, 2008)
- Might and Magic: Heroes Kingdoms (MMO, 2009)
- Might & Magic Heroes Online (MMO, 2014)
- Might & Magic Heroes: Era of Chaos (mobile, 2017)

=== Spin-offs ===
- Dark Messiah of Might and Magic (2006), first-person action RPG continuing the story of Heroes V
- Might & Magic: Clash of Heroes (2009), puzzle RPG serving as a prequel to Heroes V
  - Might and Magic: Clash of Heroes - I am the Boss (2011), DLC
- Might & Magic X: Legacy (2014), continues the story of Heroes VI

=== Anthologies and special editions ===
- Heroes of Might and Magic Compendium (1997), known as Heroes of Might and Magic Full Fantasy Funpack in Germany, includes King's Bounty and first two Heroes games including the Price of Loyalty expansion pack. Released by 3DO/Ubisoft.
- Heroes of Might and Magic II Gold (1998), includes Heroes II, its expansion pack, and 31 additional single-map scenarios by various authors. Released by 3DO.
- Heroes of Might and Magic Millennium (1999), includes King's Bounty, Heroes I, Heroes II Gold and Heroes III, but no expansion packs to Heroes III. Released by 3DO, in a 3 CD-ROM disc set.
- Heroes of Might and Magic III Complete (2000), a special edition that includes Heroes III and its expansion packs (all updated to latest versions) and a custom title screen. Released by 3DO.
- Heroes of Might and Magic Trilogy (2000), Heroes I, Heroes II and Heroes III, but no expansion packs to Heroes II nor Heroes III. Released in a joint venture by 3DO and Ubisoft, in a 3 CD-ROM disc set.
- Heroes of Might and Magic: Platinum Edition (2002), includes Heroes I, Heroes II Gold and Heroes III Complete. Released by 3DO, in a 4 CD-ROM disc set.
- Heroes of Might and Magic III+IV Complete (2002), includes Heroes III Complete and Heroes IV Complete. Released by Ubisoft, in a 1 DVD-ROM disc set.
- Heroes of Might and Magic IV Complete (2004), includes Heroes IV and all of its expansion packs. Released by Ubisoft.
- Heroes of Might and Magic V: Silver Edition (2006), includes Heroes V and the expansion pack Hammers of Fate.
- Heroes of Might and Magic V: Collector's Edition (2007), includes Heroes V and all of its expansion packs. It also includes three bonus DVDs including Storyline Trailers for the main game and its expansion pack, Developer Diaries, Heroes V Universe Album, Exclusive Monsters Test Videos, Fan-Made Heroes Game Encyclopedia and more. Released by Ubisoft.
- Heroes of Might and Magic: Complete Edition (2007), includes the first five Heroes games and their expansion packs. The included games are accompanied by extras and goodies, such as soundtracks DVDs, a faction booklet, a Heroes of Might and Magic V T-shirt or The Art of Might and Magic artbook. Released by Ubisoft.
- Might and Magic Heroes V: Epic Collection (2009), includes Heroes V and both of its expansion packs. Released by Encore Games.
- Heroes Pack (2009), includes Dark Messiah and Heroes V and its expansion packs. Available on Steam.
- Might & Magic Heroes Collection (2011), includes all five Heroes games and their expansion packs - like the 2007 Complete Edition, without the extras. It was released in most parts of the world by Ubisoft, as a 3 disc set, and in the UK, by Mastertronic Games in a 4 disc set.
- Might & Magic Heroes VI: Limited Edition (2011), includes Heroes VI and Heroes III along with one extra item (Staff of Asha) and hero (Kraal) for Heroes VI. Released by Ubisoft.
- Might & Magic Heroes VI: Deluxe Digital Edition (2011), includes a digital copy of Heroes VI, two .pdf documents (164-page concept art book and an A2 format double sided poster), the game's soundtrack and one month subscription on Heroes Kingdoms. Released by Ubisoft.
- Might and Magic Franchise Pack (2012), includes Dark Messiah, Heroes V and its expansion packs, Clash of Heroes and its DLC, Heroes VI and its two adventure packs. Available on Steam.
- Might & Magic Heroes VI: Gold Edition (2012), includes Heroes VI and its two adventure packs. Released by Ubisoft.
- Might & Magic Heroes VI: Complete Edition (2013), includes Heroes VI (version 1.5.1) and its standalone expansion pack and two adventure packs.

== Gameplay ==
The Heroes series is within the genre of turn-based strategy. The titular heroes are player characters who can recruit armies, move around the map, capture resources, and engage in combat. The heroes also incorporate some role-playing game elements; they possess a set of statistics that confer bonuses to an army, artifacts that enhance their powers, and knowledge of magical spells that can be used to attack enemies or produce strategic benefits. Also, heroes gain experience levels from battle, such that veteran heroes are significantly more powerful than inexperienced ones. Experienced heroes may persist through a campaign, but generally do not carry over between scenarios.

On a typical map, players begin a game with one town of a chosen alignment. The number of different alignments varies throughout the series, with the lowest count of four appearing initially in Heroes I and peaking at nine in the Heroes III expansion packs Armageddon's Blade. Each town alignment hosts a unique selection of creatures from which the player can build an army. Town alignment also determines other unique traits such as native hero classes, special bonuses or abilities, and leanings toward certain skills or kinds of magic.

Towns play a central role in the games since they are the primary source of income and new recruits. A typical objective in each game is to capture all enemy towns. Maps may also start with neutral towns, which do not send out heroes but may still be captured by any player. It is therefore possible, and common, to have more towns than players on a map. When captured, a town retains its alignment type, allowing the new owner to create a mixed army, although Heroes VI introduces the ability to change a town's alignment to the capturing player's. A player or team is eliminated when no towns or heroes are left under their control, or they do not control a town for seven consecutive days. Barring any special conditions, the last player or team remaining is the victor.

A side objective commonly appearing in the series is the acquisition of a powerful object called the "ultimate artifact" (Heroes I and II), grail (III and IV), or Tear of Asha (V, VI, and VII), buried somewhere on the map. In all games except Heroes VI, heroes visit special locations (called obelisks, or oracles in Heroes IV) to gradually reveal a map of the location of the artifact; in Heroes VI, a hero must instead collect four Fragments of the Moon Disc, which then causes the Tear of Asha to appear somewhere on the map. The ultimate artifact provides immense bonuses to the hero that carries it; the grail or Tear of Asha allows the hero to construct a special building in one of their towns that confers immense bonuses to the player.

=== Time and resource model ===
Each turn (consisting of all players' moves) is represented as a single day, and days are organized into cycles of weeks and months (measured as four weeks). The primary resource is gold, which is generated by towns on a daily basis. Gold alone is sufficient for obtaining basic buildings and most creatures. As construction progresses, increasing amounts of secondary resources such as wood, ore, gems, crystals, sulfur, and mercury are required. These resources, as well as gold, are produced at mines and other secondary structures, which are located on the map and require heroes to capture them. As with towns, mines can also be captured by enemy heroes, presenting an additional avenue for conflict.

At the start of each week (each day in Heroes IV), creature dwellings produce new recruits, and in most cases neutral armies will increase in size (by default; can be turned off if desired). In some of the games, the start of a new month causes neutral armies to spawn all over the map, providing fresh challenges and opportunities.

=== Combat ===
Whenever a player engages in battle, the game changes from the adventure map display to a combat screen, which is based on either a hexagonal or square grid. In this mode, the game mimics the turn-based tactics genre, as the engaged armies must carry through the battle without the opportunity to reinforce or gracefully retreat. With few exceptions, combat must end with the losing army deserting, being destroyed, or paying a heavy price in gold to surrender. Surrendering allows the player to keep the remaining units intact.

Creatures in an army are represented by unit stacks, each of which consists of a single type of creature, in any quantity. A limited number of stacks are available to each army, varying by game. Players generally maneuver their stacks attempting to achieve the most favorable rate of attrition for themselves. The games also have an automatic combat option that allows the computer to make tactical choices for a player. Heroes participate in battle as well: passively by granting bonuses to their army, and actively by engaging in combat and casting spells. In most of the games, heroes do not act as units, and cannot be harmed. However, in Heroes IV they do act as regular units and can be "killed"; these dead heroes are transferred to the nearest town's dungeon where they can be freed if their team captures the town.

Combat is affected by several random factors. In addition to simulating dice rolls to determine damage, a variety of influences including hero abilities and special bonuses determine a unit's luck and morale ratings, which affect the likelihood of those units triggering a bonus during combat. A unit that triggers good luck deals more (or receives less) damage, and a unit that triggers high morale receives an extra turn. In some other games, luck and morale can also be negative, with opposite corresponding effects. Luck and morale can be improved by hero abilities, artifacts, and spells. Morale may suffer with overwhelming odds in combat or by mixing incompatible unit types (e.g. Chaos with Order.)

=== History of changes ===
Knowledge allows heroes to cast more spells, either through a spell memorization (HoMM I) or spell point (II-V) system.

Heroes II introduced secondary skills. Heroes can learn a limited variety of secondary skills with several levels of proficiency. Secondary skills give specific, miscellaneous bonuses to heroes and their armies. For example, skill in logistics increases the distance a hero's army can travel, while skill in leadership gives their army a morale bonus.

Beginning with Heroes II, some creatures were able to be upgraded. By Heroes III, every creature (excluding those not found in any castle) was able to be upgraded.

Heroes III also introduced a new artifact platform; rather than having 14 spaces for any artifact, the player instead has a much larger backpack, but can only use a limited number. For example, only one headpiece can be used at a time, as well as only one pair of boots, etc.

=== Replay value ===
Games in the series often include a map editor and/or random map generator. Several fansites collect and rate user-generated maps.

== Storyline ==
=== Original continuity ===
A single-player campaign map of Antagarich, as seen in Heroes III: Armageddon's Blade

The first four Heroes games take place in the same fictional universe as the Might and Magic series (except Might & Magic X: Legacy, which is set in the Ubisoft continuity), and later Might and Magic installments heavily referenced the games, with some taking place on the same world.

Heroes I and II take place on the planet of Enroth, on a northerly continent of the same name, and chronicle the adventures of the Ironfist dynasty. The protagonist of Heroes I is Lord Morglin Ironfist, a knight originally from the world of Varn (the setting of Might and Magic Book One: The Secret of the Inner Sanctum), who discovers a portal to the realm of Enroth while fleeing from his throne's usurpers and goes on to conquer and dominate the continent, establishing a unified kingdom and a new royal family.

Heroes II featured a two-sided conflict between Morglin's sons, Roland and Archibald, both vying for their deceased father's throne. Canonically, the good-natured Roland defeats the evil Archibald, though the player can choose to align themself with either side and experience either outcome. It was the first game in the series to feature playable heroes as campaign characters—the main characters of Heroes I were represented by the player's presence rather than as commanders on the battlefield.

The storylines of Heroes III and the Heroes Chronicles shift focus to the Gryphonheart dynasty on the southern continent of Antagarich, and introduces the Kreegan as playable characters and enemies. In Heroes III, Queen Catherine Gryphonheart, King Roland Ironfist's wife, is called home to attend her father's funeral, only to discover Antagarich being torn apart by various factions. Heroes III's expansion packs build on the setting with more prominent character development, featuring new and old heroes from the series in differing roles.

The events preceding Heroes IV precipitated the destruction of the planet Enroth due to a clash between Armageddon's Blade and the Sword of Frost. The ensuing destruction prompts the opening of portals leading to another world, Axeoth, through which many refugees escape. Heroes IV's campaigns focus on the scattered survivors from Enroth and Antagarich as they form new kingdoms and alliances in the new world.

The 2025 game Heroes of Might and Magic: Olden Era is the first original game to be set in the original continuity since Ubisoft's continuity reboot. It takes place 500 years before the first game, and is set on the planet Enroth's continent of Jadame, which was the setting of Might and Magic VIII: Day of the Destroyer, but had not been featured in the Heroes series before.

=== Ubisoft continuity ===
The franchise underwent a continuity reboot after being acquired by Ubisoft, with Heroes of Might and Magic V (2006) being the first title in the new continuity. The games are set in the world of Ashan, which had not previously appeared in the franchise. Heroes V's six campaigns are each centered around a faction leader, tied together by the character of Isabel Greyhound, Queen of the Holy Griffin Empire. The Heroes V expansion packs both continued this storyline, leading into the events of Dark Messiah of Might and Magic.

Heroes VI acts as a prequel to Heroes V, occurring 400 years prior. Heroes VII occurs centuries after Heroes VI but still 100 years before Heroes V.

Other games in the Might and Magic franchise released after the acquisition by Ubisoft are also usually set in the same continuity.

== Reception ==
Critical reception for the series has been generally positive, with GameRankings scores averaging from the high 70s to high 90s.

By October 1997, overall sales of the Heroes of Might and Magic series had surpassed 500,000 copies. This number had risen to 1.5 million copies by December 1999. The Might and Magic franchise as a whole, including the Heroes series, surpassed 4.5 million copies in sales by May 2001.

In 1999, Next Generation listed the Heroes of Might and Magic series as number 31 on their "Top 50 Games of All Time", commenting that, "With beautiful 2D characters and maps and absolutely brilliant strategy, Heroes managed to be a completely engrossing game that never once replaced quality design with new-fangled flash."
