= Loki Entertainment =

Defunct American video game developer

Loki Software, Inc.
- Type: Privately
- Industry: Video games
- Founded: November 9, 1998; 27 years ago
- Founder: Scott Draeker
- Defunct: January 31, 2002; 24 years ago
- Fate: Bankruptcy
- Headquarters: Tustin, California, US
- Number of employees: Approx. 10 (2001)
- Website: lokigames.com at the Wayback Machine (archived May 26, 2002)

Loki Software, Inc. (Loki Entertainment) was an American video game developer based in Tustin, California, that ported several video games from Microsoft Windows to Linux. It took its name from the Norse deity Loki. Although successful in its goal of bringing games to the Linux platform, the company folded in January 2002 after filing for bankruptcy.

== History ==
Loki Software was founded on November 9, 1998, by Scott Draeker, a former lawyer who became interested in porting games to Linux after being introduced to the system through his work as a software licensing attorney. By December of that year Loki had gained the rights to produce a port of Activision's then-upcoming strategy game Civilization: Call to Power for Linux. This was to become Loki's first actual product, with the game hitting stores in May 1999. From there they gained contracts to port many other titles, such as Myth II: Soulblighter, Railroad Tycoon II, and Eric's Ultimate Solitaire. Throughout the next two years up until its eventual closure the company would continue to bring more games to Linux. BSDi had also partnered with Loki to ensure its Linux ports ran on FreeBSD through a compatibility layer. After facing financial difficulties, Loki filed for bankruptcy in August 2001. The majority of the staff was laid off in January 2002 and Loki formally closed on January 31.

== Legacy ==
Loki Software, although a commercial failure, is credited with the birth of the modern Linux game industry. Loki developed several free software tools, such as the Loki installer (also known as Loki Setup), and supported the development of the Simple DirectMedia Layer. They also started the OpenAL audio library project (now being run by Creative Technology and Apple Inc.) and with id Software wrote GtkRadiant. These are still often credited as being the cornerstones of Linux game development. They also worked on and extended several already developed tools, such as GCC and GDB. The book Programming Linux Games written in the early 2000s by Loki intern John R. Hall explains the major APIs Loki used to produce Linux games.

Loki also offered a start to many figures still in the Linux and gaming industries. Ryan C. Gordon (also known as icculus), a former employee of Loki, has been responsible for the Linux and Mac OS X ports of many commercial games after the demise of the company. Mike Phillips would help start Linux Game Publishing, which was itself founded in response to Loki's closure. Nicholas Vining would go on to do some porting work and is currently the lead programmer at Gaslamp Games, which would later release their game Dungeons of Dredmor for Linux. Sam Lantinga would also later join Blizzard Entertainment and found Galaxy Gameworks to commercially support the Simple DirectMedia Layer; he would later also join Valve's Linux team.

Although many Loki ports are unsupported since Loki's closure, Linux Game Publishing managed to pick up the rights to MindRover and offer a supported and updated version of the game's Linux port. id Software picked up the support for the Linux release of Quake III Arena, hiring Timothee Besset to maintain it; he would later also be responsible for porting some of id's later products to Linux. Running with Scissors, to celebrate the release of the movie Postal in 2007 published a multiplayer only version of Postal 2, without the single player campaign. In 2004 the source header files for Rune were released freely by Human Head Studios. But so far no one has updated the Linux version of Rune, though the company stated that a game sequel is in the making, and delayed the development of Prey 2.

Software contractor Frank C. Earl claimed in 2010 to hold the porting rights for the entire Myth series and says he will port it to Linux. Kevin Bentley worked in 2009 on a Descent 3 patch for Linux, which was re-released in 2014 on Steam by Rebecca Heineman, who got blessed source code access. On October 16, 2011, Project Magma released a new version of Myth II: Soulblighter for Linux.

== Games published ==
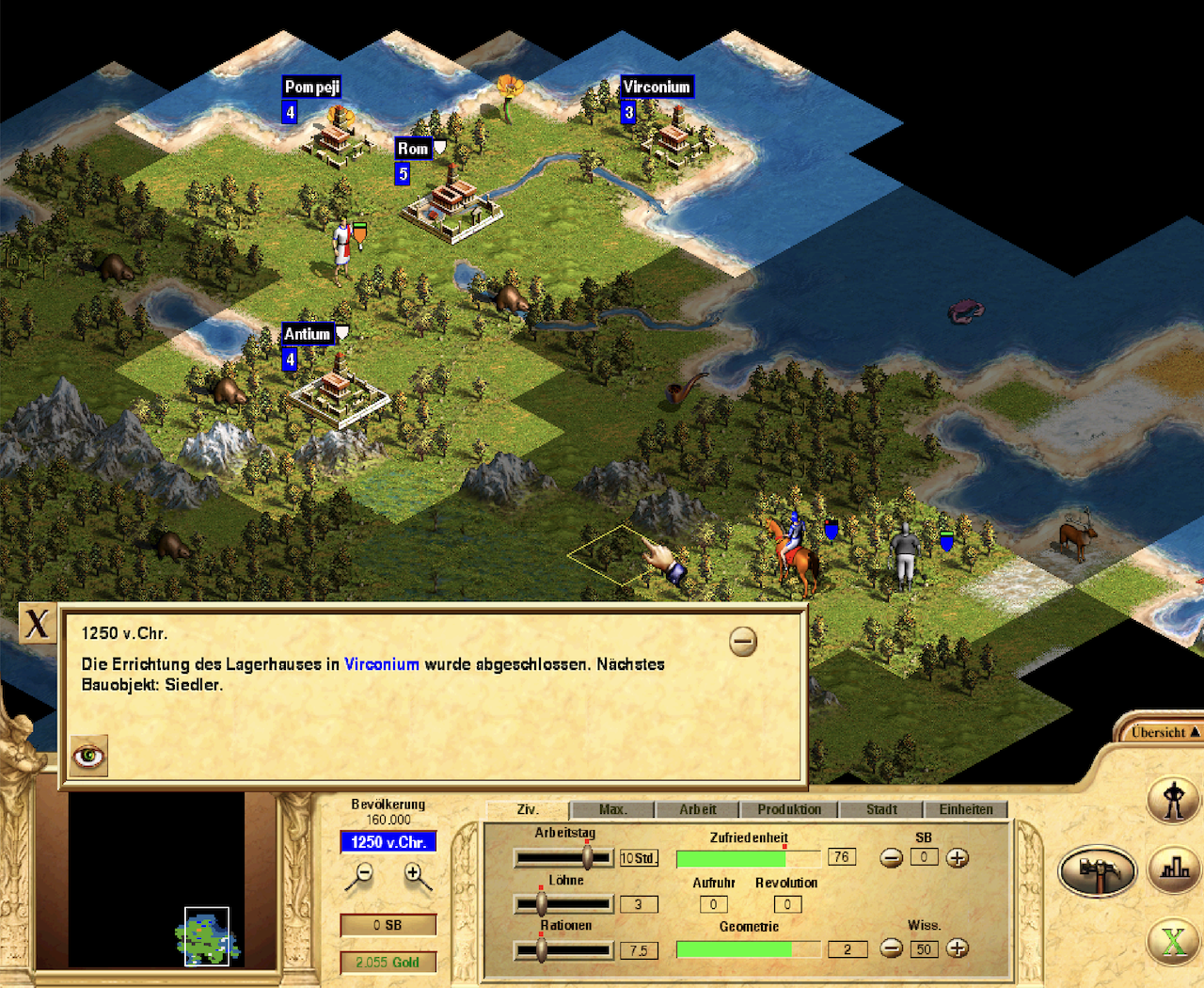
Civilization: Call to Power was the first game ported by Loki.

Postal Plus was the last game ported by Loki.

Title	Platforms			
Title	IA-32	PowerPC	Alpha	SPARC
Civilization: Call to Power	Yes	Yes	Yes	Yes
Descent 3	Yes	No	No	No
Descent 3: Mercenary (expansion, as downloadable installer only)	Yes	No	No	No
Eric's Ultimate Solitaire	Yes	Yes	Yes	Yes
Heavy Gear II	Yes	No	No	No
Heavy Metal: F.A.K.K.²	Yes	No	No	No
Heretic II	Yes	No	No	No
Heroes of Might and Magic III	Yes	Yes	No	No
Kohan: Immortal Sovereigns	Yes	No	No	No
MindRover	Yes	No	No	No
Myth II: Soulblighter	Yes	Yes	No	No
Postal Plus	Yes	No	No	No
Railroad Tycoon II Gold Edition	Yes	Yes	No	No
Quake III Arena	Yes	No	No	No
Rune	Yes	No	No	No
Rune: Halls of Valhalla (expansion)	Yes	No	No	No
Sid Meier's Alpha Centauri Planetary Pack	Yes	Yes	Yes	No
Sim City 3000: Deutschland/Unlimited/World Edition	Yes	No	No	No
Soldier of Fortune	Yes	No	No	No
Tribes 2	Yes	No	No	No
Unreal Tournament (as downloadable installer only)	Yes	No	No	No

In addition to the published titles, there is also an unfinished port of Deus Ex. The later update of Deus Ex for Microsoft Windows features the OpenGL driver for the Unreal Engine from Loki Software's Linux port. This makes the title more compatible with Wine.

== See also ==
- Linux Game Publishing
- Steam
- Ryan C. Gordon
- Linux gaming
