= Heroes of Might and Magic III =

1999 video game

Heroes of Might and Magic III: The Restoration of Erathia
- Developers: New World Computing; Loki Software (Linux); DotEmu (HD Edition)
- Publishers: The 3DO Company; Loki Software (Linux); Ubisoft (HD Edition)
- Director: David Mullich
- Designers: Gregory Fulton; Jon Van Caneghem
- Programmer: John Bolton
- Artist: Phelan Sykes
- Composers: Paul Romero; Rob King; Steve Baca
- Series: Heroes of Might and Magic
- Platforms: Windows, Macintosh, Linux (PowerPC/x86), iOS, Android
- Release: February 28, 1999: Windows; NA: February 28, 1999; EU: April 1, 1999; Linux; NA: December 20, 1999; Mac; NA: December 21, 1999; Complete Windows; NA: October 2, 2000; EU: 2000 Mac; NA: December 19, 2000 HD Edition Windows, iOS, Android; WW: January 29, 2015
- Genre: Turn-based strategy
- Modes: Single-player, multiplayer

Heroes of Might and Magic III: The Restoration of Erathia (commonly referred to as Heroes of Might and Magic 3, or Heroes 3, or abbreviated HoMM 3) is a turn-based strategy game, developed by Jon Van Caneghem through New World Computing and originally released for Microsoft Windows by The 3DO Company in 1999.

As the third installment of the Heroes of Might and Magic series, the game was released to universal acclaim and commercial success, becoming a defining classic of the turn-based strategy genre. It received two major official expansion packs, Armageddon's Blade and The Shadow of Death, which were packaged together in 2000 as Heroes of Might and Magic III Complete.

In 2026, Heroes of Might and Magic III Remake was announced, set to release in 2027 on PlayStation 5, Xbox Series X/S and Windows. The project is being developed by Ubisoft Shanghai and Ubisoft Chengdu.

Heroes III receives continued unofficial support through community modding projects, notably the 2011 Horn of the Abyss expansion.

== Gameplay ==
In Heroes of Might and Magic III, the player can select spells (foreground) to sway the outcome of tactical battles (background).

The game is a turn based strategy title in which the player controls heroes that command armies of mythic and legendary creatures. These heroes travel across the game world fighting creatures, and collecting loot. This includes resources, which can be used to develop towns, as well as magic artifacts which offer buffs to a hero. Heroes can contest resource posts such as mines, which offer a resource income each turn, and attack other towns. Combat occurs on a hexagonal grid where units move, attack, and cast spells.

Heroes III refines the gameplay mechanics of earlier titles while introducing some new features. These include a subterranean layer, larger maps and additional victory conditions. Some maps require the player to seek the Grail artifact, which can be used to build a permanent structure in a host city to gain significant bonuses, such as increased resource generation and unique town enhancements. Eight factions were included, up from six in Heroes II, with a ninth added in the Armageddon's Blade expansion. Heroes can also gain abilities which offer them individual perks. For example, the Diplomacy skill allows a hero to negotiate with an enemy and convince them to join up rather than fight.

Heroes III can be played alone through a series of campaigns, as well as cooperatively and competitively through multiplayer maps. 50 skirmish maps were included for this purpose.

== Plot ==
The game's story unfolds primarily through a series of seven playable campaigns, all set on the continent of Antagarich. During the campaigns, the story is told from alternating points of view, giving players the opportunity to play as each of the town alignments.

Following the disappearance of King Roland Ironfist of Enroth prior to Might and Magic VI: The Mandate of Heaven, his wife, Queen Catherine, is left to rule the realm. In the meantime, her father, King Nicholas Gryphonheart of Erathia, is assassinated. Without their beloved king, the kingdom of Erathia falls to the dark forces of Nighon and Eeofol. Queen Catherine returns home to Antagarich seeking to rally the people of her homeland and lead them against the evil that has ravaged their nation.

Erathia's capital of Steadwick is sacked by the Dungeon Overlords of Nighon and the Kreegans of Eeofol. Meanwhile, the nations of Tatalia and Krewlod skirmish at the western border, seizing the chance to expand their territory. Catherine's first task is to establish a foothold in the conquered kingdom by enlisting the aid of allies. The wizards of Bracada and the elves of AvLee answer her call, and together they push towards Steadwick and eventually retake it, quickly quelling the border war in the west. Soon after, Lucifer Kreegan, a commander in the Eeofol armies, sends an envoy to Erathia claiming that Roland Ironfist is captive within their territories. AvLee invades Eeofol, but fails to rescue Roland, who is transported to their northern holdings. Afterwards, Catherine invades the tunnels of Nighon, pushing the Dungeon armies back to their island home.

In the meantime, the necromancers of Deyja, having been responsible for the assassination of King Gryphonheart, plot to revive his corpse as a lich. They plan to use his wisdom in leading their own armies of the undead. However, King Gryphonheart reanimates as a lich and takes control of Deyja, defying the necromancers' expectations. Having little other recourse, Queen Catherine is forced to ally herself with several of the necromancers and together they set out to destroy Lich King Gryphonheart before he becomes too powerful.

A final campaign, unlocked after completing the main story, follows the separatists in the Contested Lands. Tired of the skirmishes that bring unrest to their homelands, they join to fight for independence from the two large kingdoms. It is later implied that this rising was orchestrated by Archibald Ironfist, the antagonist of Heroes of Might and Magic II.

== Release ==
The game was originally released for Windows on February 28, 1999. An Apple Macintosh port was released by 3DO, and a Linux port was released by Loki Software, both in late December that year. In 2000, a Game Boy Color port entitled Heroes of Might and Magic 2 was released. A Dreamcast port was developed, but not released due to technical issues that prevented the console running the game adequately. This version was cancelled in 2000. A copy of the Dreamcast build was purchased by a private collector in 2005, and in 2020 the collector released it publicly after a brief fundraiser.

=== Expansions ===
Two official expansion packs and eight level packs were released for Heroes III.

- Armageddon's Blade (1999) introduced a ninth town alignment, the Conflux; a random scenario generator, a variety of new creatures, heroes, and structures; and six new playable campaigns.
- The Shadow of Death (2000) was a stand-alone expansion that included The Restoration of Erathia and added seven new playable campaigns and a variety of new artifacts, including Combination Artifacts. Combination Artifacts are formed by combining specific sets of lesser artifacts, granting enhanced abilities.
- Heroes Chronicles (2000-2001) was an episodic set of level packs released across eight entries. These were stand-alone releases that do not require the base game to play, and were intended for newcomers to the franchise. Four of them were sold individually, two were free downloads and the final two chapters were sold as a bundle in June 2001. All eight installments were re-released through GOG.com in 2011.

=== Re-releases ===
The game has seen several re-releases; none of these versions include the Chronicles level packs.

- Heroes of Might and Magic III Complete (2000) includes the base game and both expansions on a single disc, with a reworked installation process as well as its in-game menus to reflect a unified product. In 2025, Heroes of Might and Magic III Complete became the first video game ever preserved on a SPhotonix 5D optical crystal, the world's most durable data storage within GOG's Preservation Program.
- Heroes of Might and Magic III: HD Edition (2015) was a Ubisoft re-release for PC and Android and iOS tablets. The expansion packs were not included because the source code for those releases was lost, it also excluded the random map generator. It launched in a buggy state and was poorly received. GameSpot and PCGamesN both pointed out that players could simply purchase the Complete edition and run the community supported HD mod; this method cost less and included the expansion packs.
- Heroes of Might and Magic III Remake (2027) – a full remake of the game, including the two expansions and backward compatibility for user made maps from the original.

=== Community modding ===
Heroes III has maintained an enduring popularity, and a number of notable mods have been made by the community. Many mods originate with its large Russian and Polish language fan base. In particular, two expansion-scale mods have received new music from original composer Paul Romero and support from the original designer Gregory Fulton:

- Horn of the Abyss (2011) adds three new town types, a large number of new map items, new playable campaigns, a graphical random map generator template editor, among other improvements and features. Its most recent major version update was on January 1, 2024, which added a new town and a number of maps. The official Heroes board game includes the additional factions from the mod. It is presented at the original resolution, though the HD mod is included with the installer.
- Day of Reckoning (TBA) seeks to bridge the gap in story line between the end of Heroes Chronicles and Heroes IV. It is set to include several original factions, including the Vori elves and an adaptation of the cut Forge faction. Fulton has stated that the Day of Reckoning version of the Forge is closer to the original design than the Horn of the Abyss version, which is more in line with Archon's board game adaptation. The mod was announced in 2021 and is still in development as of 2026.

Other mods include:

- In the Wake of Gods (2001) Also titled Heroes 3.5, WoG adds new creatures, including eighth level creatures and "God's representatives", which give bonuses to heroes' primary skills. Heroes can also destroy and rebuild towns. WoG was well received by Russian games magazine Igromania, which found the release better than the official expansions.
- VCMI (2008) is an open source implementation of the engine for Windows, Linux, macOS, Android and iOS. It offers higher resolutions and extensive mod support.
- The Succession Wars (2008) is a total conversion mod. It is a remake of Heroes of Might and Magic II: The Succession Wars using the Heroes III engine.
- HoMM3 HD (2010) is a mod which adds support for higher resolutions, up to 4000 x 4000, and reworks the interface to be usable at that scale. A number of games journalists compared the mod favourably against the official HD re-release. HoMM3 HD is developed by a member of the Horn of the Abyss team, and it is recommended by the group.

== Reception ==
=== Original release ===
==== Critical reviews ====
Heroes of Might and Magic III

Aggregate score
Aggregator	Score
GameRankings	87%

Review scores
Publication	Score
CNET Gamecenter	9 out of 10
Computer Games Strategy Plus	5/5
Computer Gaming World	4.5/5
Game Informer	8.75 out of 10
GamePro	4.5/5
GameRevolution	B+
GameSpot	9.1 out of 10
GameStar	86%
IGN	9 out of 10
Next Generation	4/5
PC Accelerator	7 out of 10
PC Gamer (UK)	87%
PC Gamer (US)	86%

The original game received favorable reviews according to the review aggregation website GameRankings.

Computer Gaming World's Robert Coffey said that the game "expands upon the insanely addictive play of the previous edition, retaining the core gameplay while enhancing almost every facet of the game." He continued to say that the game is "mind-boggling in its depth", but criticized its uneven campaign pacing and "sluggish" connection speeds during online play. He concluded: "Ultimately, the rewards of Heroes of Might and Magic III far outweigh its few drawbacks... [This] is a game that strategy fans should absolutely be playing." Next Generation said, "While realtime strategy withers on the vine, with many recent releases lackluster at best, HoMM reminds us that turn-based play is alive and well. In fact, it's hard to remember why people said turn-based was dead in the first place."

==== Sales ====
The game entered PC Data's weekly computer game sales charts at #3 for the February 28-March 6 period. It held the position for another two weeks, before exiting the weekly top 10 in its fourth week. It was the U.S.' second-best-selling computer game of March 1999. PC Data, which tracked sales in the U.S., reported that the game had sold 185,553 units in September 2000. The combined global sales of the Heroes series had reached 1.5 million units by December 1999.

==== Awards ====
The game was a finalist for Computer Games Strategy Plus' 1999 "Strategy Game of the Year" prize, although it lost to RollerCoaster Tycoon. The staff wrote that the game "keeps this series running on all cylinders. There's nothing radically different here, but what would you change?" It was also a finalist for the "Computer Strategy Game of the Year" award during the Academy of Interactive Arts & Sciences' 3rd Annual Interactive Achievement Awards, which ultimately was given to Age of Empires II: The Age of Kings. The game was a runner-up for "Best Music" at GameSpot's Best & Worst of 1999 Awards, which went to Homeworld.

==== Popularity in Eastern Europe ====
While the game was developed in the United States, the game was particularly popular in Eastern Europe for several reasons. The game was localized into Russian and Polish in 1999, something that was at the time unusual for a western game, meaning there was less competition than normal. The game was widely distributed in the region, where piracy was prevalent at the time. Finally, the presence of a hot-seat multiplayer mode was a major attraction as only 2% of Russian and 7% of Polish households had internet access in 1999. The title remains popular in the region.

==== Popularity in Hungary ====
The game also enjoyed a relatively notable popularity in Hungary. Its popularity was largely driven by the Hungarian gaming magazine PC Guru including it as a full game with its March 2001 issue.

=== HD Edition ===
Heroes of Might and Magic III: HD Edition

Aggregate score
Aggregator	Score	
Aggregator	iOS	PC
Metacritic	73/100	65/100

Review scores
Publication	Score	
Publication	iOS	PC
4Players	39%	49%
GameSpot	N/A	6/10
GameStar	N/A	86%
Gamezebo	3/5	N/A
GameZone	N/A	7.5/10
PC Gamer (UK)	N/A	71%
PCGamesN	N/A	7/10
Pocket Gamer	3.5/5	N/A
TouchArcade	4/5	N/A
National Post	N/A	6/10

The HD Edition, while touted by the developer as having updated graphics and improved gameplay, lacks the expansion content. It is instead based on the original 1999 game. This was one of the largest problems cited by various reviewers, and has been a significant cause of controversy.

The PC and iOS versions of the HD Edition received "mixed or average reviews" according to the review aggregation website Metacritic.

== Board game adaptation ==
In 2022, Archon Studio announced that they were creating a board game based on Heroes of Might and Magic III. The game involves deckbuilding, combat units, and economic management. Each play session features a unique objective, with maps generated through a tile-placement system .

The Kickstarter campaign received more than US$2 million (equivalent to $2.2 million in 2025) in its first week, and reached £2.6 million in its final week, or 6000% of its £43,000 funding goal.
