= List of role-playing video games: 1998 to 1999 =

This is a comprehensive index of commercial role-playing video games (RPGs), sorted chronologically by year. Information regarding release platform, release type, RPG subgenre, game setting, developers, publishers, and country of origin is provided where available. The table can be sorted by clicking on the small boxes next to the column headings.

This list includes all RPG subgenres, including MMORPGs, Action RPGs and Tactical RPGs. This list does not include MUDs and Roguelikes by default, unless they have an additional RPG subgenre. For standalone lists on these subgenres, see List of MUDs and List of roguelikes

== Legend ==
Video game platforms
DC	Dreamcast	DOS	PC DOS / MS-DOS, Windows 3.X	DROID	Android
GB	Game Boy	GBC	Game Boy Color	iOS	iOS, iPhone, iPod, iPadOS, iPad, visionOS, Apple Vision Pro
LIN	Linux, SteamOS	MAC	Classic Mac OS, 2001 and before	MSX2	MSX2
N64	Nintendo 64, iQue Player	NEO	Neo Geo AES	NX	(replace with NS)
PS1	PlayStation 1	PSP	PlayStation Portable	SAT	Sega Saturn
SNES	Super NES / Super Famicom / Super Comboy	WIN	Windows, all versions Windows 95 and up	WIN3X	Term not found
WS	WonderSwan				

Types of releases
Compilation	A compilation, anthology or collection of several titles, usually (but not always) belonging to the same series
Early access	A game launched in early access is unfinished and thus might contain bugs and glitches or have some of the content missing
Episodic	An episodic video game that is released in batches over a period of time
Expansion	A large-scale DLC to an already existing game that adds new story, areas and additions and/or changes to the game's mechanics
Full release	A full release of a game that launched in early access first
Limited	A special release (often called "Limited" or "Collector's Edition") with bonus collector's material. Often provided to people who pre-order a game
Port	The game first appeared on a different platform and a port was made. The game is like the original, with few or no differences
Remake	The game is an enhanced remake of an original, made using a new engine and/or assets and thus containing completely new sound, graphics and possibly changes to the story and/or gameplay
Remaster	The game is a remaster of an original, released on the same or different platform, with (usually minor) changes to graphics, sound and/or gameplay
Rerelease	The game was re-released on the same platform with no or only minor changes

Video game genres
Action RPG	Action role-playing game	Dungeon crawl	Dungeon crawl	JRPG	Japanese-style role-playing game
MMORPG	Massively multiplayer online RPG	Monster tamer	Monster-taming game	MUD	Multi-user dungeon
Real-time	Real-time game	Roguelike	Roguelike, Roguelite	Sandbox	Sandbox game
Soulslike	Soulslike	Tactical RPG	Tactical role-playing game	Turn-based	Turn-based game

== List ==
Year	Title	Developer	Publisher	Setting	Platform	Subgenre	Series/Notes	COO
1998 (WW)	Asghan: The Dragon Slayer	Silmarils	Grolier Interactive; Ubi Soft	Fantasy	WIN	Action RPG		FR
1998 (JP)	Atelier Elie: The Alchemist of Salburg 2	Gust		Fantasy	PS1		Atelier	JP
1998 (JP)	Black/Matrix	Flight-Plan	NEC	Fantasy	SAT, PS1	Tactical RPG		JP
1998 (JP/EU); 1999 (NA)	Blaze and Blade: Eternal Quest	T&E Soft	JP: T&E Soft (PS); EU: Funsoft (PS); EU: THQ (PC); NA: SouthPeak Interactive (PC)	Fantasy	PS1, WIN	Action RPG		JP
1998 (JP/NA)	Brave Fencer Musashi	Square	Square; Square EA	Fantasy	PS1	Action RPG		JP
1998 (JP)	Brave Saga II ブレイブサーガ2	Takara		Sci-Fi	PS1	Tactical RPG	Brave	JP
1998 (NA)	Brigandine: The Legend of Forsena	Hearty Robin	Atlus	Fantasy	PS1	Tactical RPG		
1998 (JP)	Daikaijuu Monogatari Z: The Miracle of the Zone 大貝獣物語 ザ・ミラクル オブ ザ・ゾーン	Birthday	Hudson Soft	Fantasy	GB		Daikaijuu Monogatari	JP
1998 (WW)	Dink Smallwood	Robinson Technologies	Iridon Interactive	Fantasy	WIN, LIN, MAC, PSP, IOS, DROID	Action RPG		JP
1998 (JP); 1999 (NA)	Dragon Warrior Monsters; Dragon Quest Monsters	TOSE	Enix; Eidos	Fantasy	GBC	Monster raising	Dragon Quest Monsters, Dragon Quest	JP
1998 (JP)	Eiyuu Shigan: Gal Act Heroism 英雄志願 GAL ACT HEROISM	Microcabin	Microcabin	Fantasy	SAT			JP
1998 (JP)	Farland Saga: Toki no Douhyou	TGL	TGL	Fantasy	SAT (Port)	Tactical RPG	Farland Story	JP
1998 (NA)	Final Fantasy Adventure	Square	Sunsoft	Fantasy	GB (Rerel)	Action RPG	Mana	JP
1998 (NA)	Final Fantasy Legend	Square	Sunsoft	Fantasy	GB (Rerel)	JRPG	SaGa	JP
1998 (NA)	Final Fantasy Legend II	Square	Sunsoft	Fantasy	GB (Rerel)	JRPG	SaGa	JP
1998 (NA)	Final Fantasy Legend III	Square	Sunsoft	Fantasy	GB (Rerel)	JRPG	SaGa	JP
1998 (JP); 1999 (NA); 2002 (PAL)	Final Fantasy V	TOSE	Square; Square EA; SCE	Fantasy	PS1 (Port)	JRPG	Final Fantasy	JP
1998 (JP)	Galaxy Fraulein Yuna 3: Final Edition	Hudson Soft		Sci-Fi	PS1 (Port)	Tactical RPG	Galaxy Fraulein Yuna	JP
1998 (JP)	God Medicine FB			Fantasy	GBC			
1998 (JP)	Grandia: Digital Museum	Game Arts	ESP	Fantasy	SAT		Grandia	JP
1998 (JP)	Gunnm: Martian Memory	Yukito Products	Banpresto	Science Fiction	PS1	Action RPG	Based on the Battle Angel Alita manga (called Gunm in Japan)	JP
1998 (JP); 1999 (NA); 2001 (EU)	Jade Cocoon: Story of the Tamamayu	Genki	Genki; Ubisoft; Crave	Fantasy	PS1			
1998 (JP/NA); 1999 (EU)	Kagero: Deception II	Tecmo	Tecmo; Virgin	Fantasy	PS1	Action RPG	Deception	JP
1998 (JP/NA); 1999 (EU)	Kartia: The Word of Fate; The Legend of Kartia	Atlus	Atlus; Konami	Fantasy	PS1	Tactical RPG		JP
1998 (JP)	Kasei Monogatari 火星物語	Japan Vistec	ASCII	Fantasy	PS1		Based on the anime of the same name.	JP
1998 (JP)	Langrisser Tribute			Fantasy	SAT (Port)	Tactical RPG	Langrisser; Comp. of IV and V.	JP
1998 (JP)	Langrisser V: The End of Legend ラングリッサーV ～The End of Legend～	Masaya	NCS	Fantasy	SAT	Tactical RPG	Langrisser	JP
1998 (JP)	Langrisser: Dramatic Edition ラングリッサードラマティックエディション			Fantasy	SAT (Remake)	Tactical RPG	Langrisser; Remake of II for GEN.	JP
1999 (JP); 2000 (NA); 2001 (EU)	Legend of Dragoon	Japan Studio	SCE	Fantasy	PS1			JP
1998 (JP)	Legend of Heroes III, The: Prophecy of the Moonlight Witch; The Legend of Heroes II: Prophecy of the Moonlight Witch 英雄伝説III「白き魔女」-もうひとつの英雄たちの物語-	Nihon Falcom	Nihon Falcom	Fantasy	PS1 (Port), SAT (Port)			JP
1998 (JP)	Legend of Heroes IV, The: A Tear of Vermillion; The Legend of Heroes: A Tear of Vermillion 英雄伝説IV「朱紅い雫」	GMF	亜土電子工業	Fantasy	PS1 (Port)		Dragon Slayer: The Legend of Heroes	JP
1998 (JP); 1999 (NA); 2000 (EU)	Legend of Legaia	Contrail	SCE	Fantasy	PS1	JRPG	Legend of Legaia	JP
1998 (JP)	Lodoss War			Fantasy	GBC		Third title in the Record of Lodoss War series based on the books and manga of the same name.	JP
1998 (JP)	Lost World, The	Umax	Sunrise		MSX2			
1998 (JP)	Lunar 2: Eternal Blue Complete	Game Arts; Vanguard	Kadokawa Shoten; ESP; Working Designs	Fantasy	PS1 (Remake), SAT (Remake)		Lunar	JP
1998 (JP); 1999 (NA)	Lunar: Silver Star Story Complete	Game Arts; Japan Art Media	Kadokawa Shoten; ESP; Working Designs	Fantasy	PS1 (Remake)		Lunar	JP
1998 (JP); 1999 (NA)	Monsterseed	Sunsoft	Sunsoft	Fantasy	PS1	Tactical RPG		JP
1998 (JP)	Nemesis: The Wizardry Adventure	Shouei	Shouei	Fantasy	SAT (Port)		Wizardry	NA
1998 (JP/NA/EU)	Panzer Dragoon Saga; AZEL -パンツァードラグーン RPG-	Team Andromeda	Sega	Fantasy	SAT		Spin-off of Panzer Dragoon (a rail shooter)	JP
1998 (JP/NA)	Parasite Eve	Square	Square; Square EA	Fantasy	PS1		Based on the novel and movie of the same name.	JP
1998 (JP); 1999 (NA); 2000 (EU)	Pokémon Yellow; Pocket Monsters Pikachu and Pokémon: Special Pikachu Edition	Game Freak	Nintendo	Modern; Fantasy	GBC (Remake)	Monster raising	Pokémon; Remake of Red and Blue.	JP
1998 (JP)	Poporogue	SCE	SCE	Fantasy	PS1			JP
1998 (JP)	Princess Quest			Fantasy	SAT		Based on the audio drama of the same name.	JP
1998 (JP)	Phantasy Star Collection	Sega AM7, Digital Eclipse	Sega	Sci-Fi	SAT (Port)	JRPG	Phantasy Star; Compilation of I-IV.	JP
1998 (NA/EU); 1999 (JP)	Quest 64; Holy Magic Century; Eltale Monsters エルテイルモンスターズ	Imagineer	Imagineer; Konami; THQ	Fantasy	N64	JRPG	Quest/Eltale Monsters	JP
1998 (WW)	Quest for Camelot	Titus Interactive	Titus Interactive; Nintendo	Fantasy	GBC	Action RPG	Based on the movie Quest for Camelot	FR
1998 (JP); 2000 (NA)	Rhapsody: A Musical Adventure	Nippon Ichi	Atlus	Fantasy	PS1	Tactical RPG	Marl Kingdom	JP
1998 (JP); 2000 (NA)	Robopon Sun	Hudson Soft	Atlus	Sci-Fi	GBC	Monster raising	Robopon	JP
1998 (JP)	Robopon Star	Hudson Soft	Atlus	Sci-Fi	GBC	Monster raising	Robopon	JP
1998 (JP)	Simulation RPG Tsukūru	Pegasus Japan	ASCII	N/A	SAT, PS1	Tactical RPG	RPG Maker	JP
1998 (JP)	Sakura Taisen 2: Kimi, Shinitamou koto Nakare	Sega	Sega; Red Ent.	Steampunk	SAT	Tactical RPG	Sakura Wars	JP
1998 (NA/JP)	Seventh Cross: Evolution	Atypical Alchemists Associate	UFO; NEC	Fantasy	DC	Action RPG		JP
1998 (JP)	Shin Sedai Robot Senki: Brave Saga; Brave Saga	Takara		Sci-Fi	PS1	Tactical RPG	Brave	JP
1998 (JP)	Shining Force III (Scenario II of III)	Camelot	Sega	Fantasy	SAT	Tactical RPG	Shining	JP
1998 (JP)	Shining Force III (Scenario III of III)	Camelot	Sega	Fantasy	SAT	Tactical RPG	Shining	JP
1998 (JP)	Soukaigi	Yuke's	Square	Fantasy	PS1	Action RPG		JP
1998 (JP); 1999 (NA); 2000 (PAL)	Star Ocean: The Second Story	tri-Ace	Enix; SCE	Fantasy	PS1		Star Ocean	JP
1998 (JP)	Suikoden	Konami	Konami	Fantasy	SAT (Port)	Strategy/RPG hybrid	Suikoden	JP
1998 (JP); 1999 (NA); 2000 (EU)	Suikoden II	Konami	Konami	Fantasy	PS1	Strategy/RPG hybrid.	Suikoden	JP
1998 (JP)	Tales of Phantasia	Wolf Team; Namco Tales	Namco	Fantasy	PS1 (Port)	Action RPG	Tales	JP
1998 (JP); 1999 (NA)	Thousand Arms	Red Company	Atlus	Fantasy	PS1			JP
1998 (JP); 2000 (NA)	Vanguard Bandits	Human; Working	Human; Working	Fantasy	PS1	Tactical RPG		JP
1998 (JP)	Wachenröder	Sega	Sega	Sci-Fi; Fantasy	SAT	Tactical RPG		JP
1998 (JP)	Wizardry: Llylgamyn Saga	Solition	ASCII	Fantasy	PS1, SAT (Port, Remake)	WRPG	Wizardry; Remake of I, II and III.	NA
1998 (JP/NA)	Xenogears	Square	Square; Square EA	Sci-Fi	PS1	JRPG		JP
1999 (JP)	Airs, The エアーズ	Victor	Pack-In-Soft	Fantasy	PS1			JP
1999 (JP); 2000 (NA/EU/AU)	Alundra 2: A New Legend Begins (EN) アランドラ2 魔進化の謎 (JA)	Matrix Software; Contrail	JP: SCEI; WW: Activision	Fantasy	PS1	Action RPG	Sequel to The Adventures of Alundra which was an action-adventure game	JP
1999 (JP)	Arc the Lad III	ARC	SCEI	Fantasy	PS1	Tactical RPG	Arc the Lad	JP
1999 (WW)	Biomotor Unitron	Yumekobo	SNK	Robotics	NEO, NX	Turn-based, Dungeon crawl		JP
1999 (JP)	Black/Matrix Advanced	Flight-Plan	NEC	Fantasy	DC (Remake)	Tactical RPG	Remake of Black/Matrix for SAT.	JP
1999 (JP)	Castle Fantasia 2: Seima Taisen	Studio E-Go!	Studio E-Go!	Fantasy	WIN	Tactical RPG; Eroge	Castle Fantasia	JP
1999 (JP)	Cho-Hatsumei Boy Kanipan: Bousou Robot no Nazo!		Sega	Fantasy	DC		Based on Hatsumei Boy Kanipan.	JP
1999 (JP); 2000 (NA)	Chrono Cross	Square	Square; Square EA	Fantasy	PS1	JRPG	Chrono	JP
1999 (JP)	Chrono Trigger	TOSE	Square	Fantasy	PS1 (Port)	JRPG	Chrono	JP
1999 (NA); 2000 (EU)	Crusaders of Might and Magic	The 3DO Company	The 3DO Company	Fantasy	PS1, WIN	Action RPG	Might and Magic	US
1999 (JP)	Custom Robo	Noise	Nintendo	Robotics	N64	Action RPG	Custom Robo	JP
1999 (JP)	Daikaijuu Monogatari Z: The Miracle of the Zone II 大貝獣物語ミラクルオブザゾーンII		Hudson Soft	Fantasy	GBC		Daikaijuu Monogatari	JP
1999 (JP); 2000 (NA)	D2; Dの食卓2	WARP	Sega	Horror	DC	Survival horror/Action RPG hybrid	D	JP
1999 (JP)	Devil Summoner: Soul Hackers	TOSE	Atlus	Sci-Fi	SAT, PS1	JRPG	Shin Megami Tensei: Devil Summoner; Megami Tensei	JP
1999 (JP); 2000 (NA); 2001 (EU)	Digimon World	Bandai	Bandai	Sci-Fi; Fantasy	PS1	Monster raising	Digimon	JP
1999 (JP); 2000 (NA)	Dragon Quest I & II	Armor Project; Bird Studio	Enix	Fantasy	GBC (Port)	JRPG	Dragon Quest	JP
1999 (JP)	Dungeons & Dragons Collection	Capcom	Capcom	Fantasy	SAT (Port)	Action RPG/Beat-em-up	Dungeons & Dragons; Port of the arcade games, Tower of Doom and Shadow over Mystara.	JP
1999 (??)	Elemental Gimmick Gear	Hudson Soft	Vatical	Sci-Fi	DC			JP
1999 (JP); 2000 (UK); 2001 (NA)	Eternal Eyes	TamTam; Alpha-Unit	Sunsoft; TAMM	Fantasy	PS1	Tactical RPG		
1999 (??)	Evolution: The World of Sacred Device	Sting	ESP; Ubisoft	Sci-Fi; Fantasy	DC		Evolution Worlds	JP
1999 (JP); 2000 (NA); 2002 (EU)	Evolution 2: Far Off Promise	Sting	Ubisoft	Sci-Fi; Fantasy	DC		Evolution Worlds	JP
1999 (JP)	Farland Saga 2: Toki no Michishirube	TGL	TGL	Fantasy	PS1 (Port)	Tactical RPG	Farland Saga	JP
1999 (JP/NA); 2002 (EU)	Final Fantasy VI	TOSE	Square; Square EA; SCE	Fantasy; Sci-Fi	PS1 (Port)	JRPG	Final Fantasy	JP
1999 (JP/NA/PAL)	Final Fantasy VIII	Square	Square; Square EA; SCE; Eidos	Sci-Fi; Fantasy	PS1	JRPG	Final Fantasy	JP
1999 (NA); 2002 (EU)	Final Fantasy Anthology	Square; TOSE	Square EA; SCE	Sci-Fi; Fantasy	PS1 (Port)	JRPG	Final Fantasy; Compilation of IV and V in PAL regions, and V and VI in NA.	JP
1999 (JP)	Final Fantasy Collection			Sci-Fi; Fantasy	PS1 (Remake)	JRPG	Final Fantasy; Comp. of IV, V and VI.	JP
1999 (JP)	Fire Emblem: Thracia 776	Intelligent	Nintendo	Fantasy	SNES	Tactical RPG	Fire Emblem	JP
1999 (TW)	Flame Dragon Plus: Marks of Wind	DII		Fantasy	DOS	Tactical RPG	Flame Dragon	TW
1999 (JP); 2000 (NA/EU)	Front Mission 3	Square	Square; Square EA	Fantasy	PS1	Tactical RPG	Front Mission	JP
1999 (JP)	Ganbare Goemon: Mononoke Douchuu Tobidase Nabe-Bugyou! がんばれゴエモン もののけ道中飛び出せ鍋奉行!	TOSE	Konami	Fantasy	GBC		Ganbare Goemon	JP
1999 (JP)	Ganbare Goemon: Tengu-tou no Gyakushuu! がんばれゴエモン 天狗党の逆襲	TOSE	Konami	Fantasy	GBC		Ganbare Goemon	JP
1999 (JP/NA); 2001 (EU)	Grandia	Game Arts	ESP; SCE; Ubisoft	Fantasy	PS1 (Port)		Grandia	JP
1999 (JP)	Growlanser グローランサー	Atlus	Atlus	Fantasy	PS1	Tactical RPG	Growlanser	JP
1999 (JP/EU)	Guardian's Crusade	Tamsoft	Activision	Fantasy	PS1	JRPG		JP
1999 (JP/NA/EU)	Hybrid Heaven	Konami	Konami; Konami	Sci-Fi	N64	Action RPG		JP
1999 (JP); 2000 (NA/PAL)	Koudelka	Sacnoth	SNK; Infogrames	Horror	PS1	Tactical RPG	Shadow Hearts	JP
1999 (??)	Langrisser IV & V: Final Edition ラングリッサーIV&V ファイナルエディション			Fantasy	PS1 (Remake)	Tactical RPG	Langrisser; Remake and comp. of IV and V for SAT	JP
1999 (JP)	Langrisser Millennium ラングリッサーミレニアム	Masaya	NCS	Fantasy	DC	Tactical RPG	Langrisser	JP
1999 (JP); 2000 (NA)	Legend of Mana	Square	Square; Square EA	Fantasy	PS1	Action RPG	Mana	JP
1999 (JP)	Legend of Sword and Fairy, The	Softstar	Softstar	Fantasy	SAT (Port)		The Legend of Sword and Fairy	TW
1999 (JP)	Little Witching Mischiefs 魔女っ子大作戦	Toys For Bob	Bandai	Fantasy	PS1	Tactical RPG		JP/NA
1999 (JP); 2000 (NA)	Lunar 2: Eternal Blue Complete	Game Arts; Vanguard	Kadokawa Shoten; ESP; Working Designs	Fantasy	PS1 (Port)		Lunar	JP
1999 (JP/NA)	Megami Tensei Gaiden: Last Bible	MIT	Atlus	Fantasy	GBC (Port)	JRPG	Last Bible; Megami Tensei	JP
1999 (JP)	Megami Tensei Gaiden: Last Bible II	MIT	Atlus	Fantasy	GBC (Port)	JRPG	Last Bible; Megami Tensei	JP
1999 (NA)	Monkey Hero	Blam!	Take-Two	Fantasy	PS1	Action RPG	Based on Journey to the West.	NA
1999 (JP); 2000 (NA)	Ogre Battle 64: Person of Lordly Caliber	Quest; Nintendo	Atlus	Fantasy	N64	Tactical RPG	Ogre Battle	JP
1999 (JP)	Ore no Shikabane o Koete Yuke 俺の屍を越えてゆけ	Alfa System; MARS; Contrail	SCE	Fantasy	PS1			JP
1999 (JP)	Ouka Houshin	Media Works		Fantasy	DC	Tactical RPG		JP
1999 (JP)	Persona 2: Innocent Sin	Atlus	Atlus	Modern; Fantasy	PS1		Persona 2; Persona series; Megami Tensei	JP
1999 (JP); 2000 (AU/NA); 2001 (EU)	Pokémon Gold and Pokémon Silver	Game Freak	Nintendo	Modern; Fantasy	GBC	Monster raising	Pokémon	JP
1999 (NA)	Quest: Brian's Journey		Sunsoft	Fantasy	GBC		Quest/Eltale Monsters	JP
1999 (WW)	Revenant	Cinematix Studios	Eidos Interactive	Fantasy	WIN	Action RPG		US
1999 (JP)	Robopon Moon	Hudson Soft	Atlus	Sci-Fi	GBC	Monster raising	Robopon	JP
1999 (JP); 2000 (NA/PAL)	SaGa Frontier II	Square	Square; Square EA	Fantasy	PS1	JRPG	SaGa	JP
1999 (JP); 2001 (NA)	Saiyuki: Journey West 西遊記 (さいゆうき)	Koei	Koei	Fantasy	PS1	Tactical RPG	Based loosely on the novel, Journey to the West	JP
1999 (JP)	SD Gundam G Generation-0; SD Gundam G Generation-0: G Zero; SDガンダム ジージェネレーション・ゼロ	Bandai	Bandai	Sci-Fi	PS1	Tactical RPG	Based on the Super Deformed Gundam franchise.	JP
1999 (NA); 2000 (EU)	Shadow Madness	Craveyard	Crave	Fantasy	PS1	JRPG		NA
1999 (NA)	Shadow Tower	From	Agetec	Fantasy	PS1	Action RPG	Shadow Tower; clone of King's Field	JP
1999 (JP)	Sunrise Eiyuutan サンライズ英雄譚	Sunrise		Fantasy	DC		Sunrise Eiyuutan	JP
1999 (JP)	Super Hero Sakusen	Banpresto	Banpresto	Sci-Fi	PS1		Super Hero Sakusen	JP
1999 (JP)	Super Robot Wars 64	Banpresto	Banpresto	Sci-Fi	N64	Tactical RPG	Super Robot Wars	JP
1999 (JP)	Super Robot Wars Compact	Banpresto	Banpresto	Sci-Fi	WS	Tactical RPG	Super Robot Wars	JP
1999 (JP)	Super Robot Wars F Final	Banpresto	Banpresto	Sci-Fi	SAT	Tactical RPG	Super Robot Wars	JP
1999 (JP); 2000 (NA)	Threads of Fate	Square	Square; Square EA	Fantasy	PS1			JP
1999 (JP); 2000 (NA)	Valkyrie Profile ヴァルキリープロファイル	tri-Ace	Enix	Fantasy	PS1		Valkyrie Profile	JP
1999 (JP/NA); 2000 (PAL)	Vandal Hearts II	Konami	Konami	Fantasy	PS1	Tactical RPG	Vandal Hearts	JP
1999 (JP); 2000 (NA)	Wild Arms 2	Media.Vision	SCE	Steampunk	PS1	JRPG	Wild Arms	JP
1999 (TW)	Xuan-Yuan Sword 3: Beyond Clouds and Mountains	DOMO Studio	Softstar Entertainment	Fantasy	WIN	Action RPG	Xuan-Yuan Sword	TW
1999 (JP)	Zill O'll			Fantasy	PS1		Zill O'll	
1999 (JP)	Zool: Maju Tsukai Densetsu	Pandora Box	Imagineer	Fantasy	N64	Monster raising	Not part of the Zool series	JP
1998 (NA); 2001 (UK)	Baldur's Gate	BioWare; Black Isle	Black Isle; Interplay; Virgin	Fantasy	WIN	WRPG	Baldur's Gate; Infinity Engine; Dungeons & Dragons franchise	NA
1998 (NA)	Baldur's Gate: Gold Edition	BioWare; Black Isle	Interplay	Fantasy	WIN (Limit)	WRPG	Baldur's Gate; Infinity Engine; Dungeons & Dragons franchise	NA
1998 (NA)	Blizzard's Game of the Year Collection	Blizzard	Blizzard	Fantasy; Sci-Fi	WIN (Comp)	Action RPG; Roguelike.	Compilation of Diablo, StarCraft and WarCraft	NA
1998 (JP)	Castle Fantasia	Studio E-Go!	Studio E-Go!	Fantasy	WIN	Tactical RPG; Eroge	Castle Fantasia	JP
1998 (NA)	Descent to Undermountain	Interplay	Interplay	Fantasy	DOS, WIN	Action RPG	Dungeons & Dragons franchise	NA
1998 (NA)	Diablo	Blizzard North	Blizzard	Fantasy	WIN (Rerel)	Action RPG; Roguelike.	Diablo	NA
1998 (NA/JP)	Diablo	Blizzard North	Blizzard; SourceNext	Fantasy	MAC (Port)	Action RPG; Roguelike.	Diablo	NA
1998 (NA)	Diablo + Hellfire	Blizzard	Blizzard	Fantasy	WIN (Comp)	Action RPG; Roguelike.	Bundle of Diablo and its expansion.	NA
1998 (NA); 1999 (UK)	Fallout 2	Black Isle	Interplay	Post-apocalyptic	WIN	WRPG	Fallout	NA
1998 (TW)	Flame Dragon Plus: Marks of Wind		Dynasty	Fantasy	DOS	Tactical RPG	Flame Dragon	TW
1998 (NA); 1999 (UK)	The Elder Scrolls Adventures: Redguard	Bethesda	Bethesda	Fantasy	WIN	Action-adventure	Spin-off of The Elder Scrolls	NA
1998 (NA)	Hexplore	Heliovision	Atari	Fantasy	WIN	Action-adventure		FR
1998 (NA)	Incubation: Hidden Worlds	Blue Byte	Blue Byte	Sci-Fi	WIN (Limit)	Tactical RPG	Battle Isle	DE
1999 (JP)	Legend of Heroes III, The: Prophecy of the Moonlight Witch	Nihon Falcom	Nihon Falcom	Fantasy	WIN (Port)		Dragon Slayer: The Legend of Heroes	JP
1998 (EU); 1999 (NA)	Magic & Mayhem	Mythos (Julian Gollop)	Virgin; Bethesda	Fantasy	WIN	Tactical RPG; RTS/RPG	Successor to Chaos: The Battle of Wizards	GB
1998 (NA)	Might and Magic VI: The Mandate of Heaven	New World	3DO	Fantasy	WIN	WRPG	Might and Magic	NA
1998 (NA)	Might and Magic VI: The Mandate of Heaven - Limited Edition	New World	3DO	Fantasy	WIN (Limit, Compl)	WRPG	Might and Magic; Rerelease of VI; Includes the first five games as well.	NA
1998 (NA)	Might and Magic Six Pack	New World	Ubisoft	Fantasy	DOS (Comp), WIN (Comp)	WRPG	Might and Magic; Compilation of I through VI	NA
1998 (NA)	Nethergate	Spiderweb	Spiderweb	Historical; Fantasy	MAC, WIN	Tactical RPG	Remade in 2007 as Nethergate: Resurrection	NA
1998 (NA)	Quest for Glory V: Dragon Fire	Yosemite	Sierra	Fantasy	MAC, WIN	Adventure game/RPG hybrid	Quest for Glory	NA
1998 (NA)	Return to Krondor	Pyrotechnix	Sierra	Fantasy	WIN		Sequel to Betrayal at Krondor; spinoff of Riftwar series	NA
1998 (JP)	Simulation RPG Construction; SRC	Kei		N/A	WIN	Tactical RPG; Video game creation suite		JP
1998 (JP)	Simulation RPG Tsukūru 95	ASCII	ASCII	N/A	WIN	Tactical RPG; Video game creation suite	RPG Maker	JP
1998 (NA)	Ultimate Might and Magic Archives	New World	Interplay	Fantasy	WIN (Comp)	WRPG	Might and Magic; Comp. of the first five games, and Swords of Xeen	NA
1998 (JP)	Ultimate Wizardry Archives, The	Sir-Tech	Interplay	Fantasy; Sci-Fi	DOS (Comp), WIN (Comp)	WRPG	Wizardry. Port and compilation of I through VII and Gold	NA
1998 (JP); 2002 (NA)	Vantage Master V2; Vantage Master Online ヴァンテージ・マスターV2	Nihon Falcom	Nihon Falcom	Fantasy	WIN	Tactical RPG	Vantage Master	JP
1998 (KR)	War of Genesis Side Story I, The: Rhapsody of Zephyr; The Rhapsody of Zephyr	Softmax	Softmax	Fantasy	WIN	Tactical RPG	War of Genesis	KR
1999 (NA)	Baldur's Gate: Gold Edition	BioWare; Black Isle	Interplay	Fantasy	WIN (Limit)	WRPG	Baldur's Gate	NA
1999 (NA)	Baldur's Gate: Tales of the Sword Coast	BioWare	Black Isle	Fantasy	WIN	WRPG	Baldur's Gate expansion pack.	NA
1999 (NA)	Blades of Exile	Spiderweb	Spiderweb	Fantasy	MAC, WIN, WIN3X	Tactical RPG; Video game creation suite	Exile	NA
1999 (JP)	Farland Odyssey	TGL	TGL	Fantasy	WIN	Tactical RPG	Farland Story spinoff	JP
1999 (NA)	Darkstone	Gathering of Developers	Delphine	Fantasy	WIN	Action RPG; Diablo-style		FR
1999 (NA/EU)	Gorky 17; Odium	Metropolis	1C Company; TopWare; Monolith	Fantasy	WIN	Tactical RPG	Gorky series	PL
1999 (NA)	Jagged Alliance 2	Sir-Tech	TalonSoft	Modern	WIN	Tactical RPG	Jagged Alliance	NA
1999 (NA)	Lands of Lore III	Westwood	EA	Fantasy	WIN	WRPG	Lands of Lore	NA
1999 (JP)	Legend of Heroes V, The: A Cagesong of the Ocean 英雄伝説V「海の檻歌」	Nihon Falcom	Nihon Falcom	Fantasy	WIN		Dragon Slayer: The Legend of Heroes	JP
1999 (JP); 2003 (CN)	Mamatoto: A Record of War ママトト -a record of war-	Alice	Alice	Fantasy	WIN	Tactical RPG; Eroge		JP
1999 (JP)	Medarot R	Natsume Co., Ltd.	Imagineer	Robotics	PS1	Action RPG	Medabots	JP
1999 (NA)	Might and Magic: Millennium Edition	New World	3DO	Fantasy	WIN (Comp)	WRPG	Might and Magic. Compilation of IV through VII, as well as Swords of Xeen	NA
1999 (NA/EU)	Might and Magic VII: For Blood and Honor	New World	3DO	Fantasy	WIN	WRPG	Might and Magic	NA
1999 (NA); 2001 (UK)	Planescape: Torment	Black Isle	Interplay; Virgin	Fantasy	WIN	WRPG	Dungeons & Dragons franchise	NA
1999 (JP)	Romancia: Another Legend	Unbalance	Nihon Falcom	Fantasy	WIN (Remake)	Action RPG	Dragon Slayer Jr: Romancia	JP
1999 (NA)	Septerra Core: Legacy of the Creator	Valkyrie	Monolith	Sci-Fi; Fantasy	WIN	JRPG		NA
1999 (NA)	System Shock 2	Irrational; Looking Glass	EA	Sci-Fi	WIN	FPS/RPG	System Shock	NA
1999 (NA)	Ultima IX: Ascension	Origin	EA	Fantasy	WIN		Ultima	NA
1999 (NA)	Ultima IX: Ascension - Dragon Edition	Origin	EA	Fantasy	WIN (Rerel)		Ultima (includes Ultima Collection)	NA
