= Might & Magic X: Legacy =

2014 video game

- Developer: Limbic Entertainment
- Publisher: Ubisoft
- Designers: Julien Pirou; Marcus Cool; Anselm Rohland; Karsten Schneider
- Programmers: Thomas Steuber; Steffen Bisplinghoff
- Artists: Alan Wang; Rick Li; Dan Hecht
- Writer: Julien Pirou
- Composers: Roc Chen; Jason Graves
- Series: Might and Magic
- Engine: Unity
- Platforms: Windows, OS X
- Release: Windows; January 23, 2014; OS X; April 16, 2014
- Genre: Role-playing
- Mode: Single-player

Might & Magic X: Legacy is a 2014 role-playing video game developed by Limbic Entertainment and published by Ubisoft. It is the tenth installment of the Might and Magic series. Instead of being a sequel to Might and Magic IX, the game follows the events of Might & Magic Heroes VI and is set in the world of Ashan. It was released on January 23, 2014, as a downloadable title for Microsoft Windows. An OS X version was released on April 16, 2014.

The game focuses on events occurring in the Agyn Peninsula of Ashan, on the continent of Thallan, following the war created by the archangel Uriel. A coup has occurred in the city of Karthal, and a party of raiders who arrive in the region are drawn into a complex plot in the region that threatens to escalate tensions in the various nations.

== Gameplay ==
=== Character creation and improvement ===
Players create a party of four characters, each of whom can belong to one of four different races - Humans, Orcs, Elves, and Dwarves - with each race having two male and female appearances to use. Each race has a choice of three classes to use - a "Might" class, a "Magic" class and a hybrid class of the two - with each class determining what skills a character begins with initially, which can be improved during character creation by allocating skill points to them. While characters can increase in level during a playthrough of the game, unlike previous titles like Might and Magic VI, characters can advance in level without going to a training centre and paying to do so, with each advancement allowing the player to improve the levels of skills known along with increasing one of six new statistics for the game: Might, Magic, Perception, Destiny, Vitality and Spirit.

Like other games, each class has a promotion quest, but only one. In Legacy, completing such a quest confers a benefit to the character for the rest of the game. However, only classes being used in a play-through have access to their promotion quests, as, unlike the previous titles, those belonging to classes not in use cannot be accessed and are therefore unavailable.

=== Movement and combat ===
The movement system in Legacy reverts to the grid-based system used prior to Might and Magic VI, in which players move around a grid to get around the game world, no matter the location they are in, with time flowing when moving between the grid's squares; the flow of time differs depending on whether they are travelling in a town/dungeon or in the wilderness. However, the game world featured in Might & Magic X is much bigger than that of the world featured in Might and Magic IV, providing more locations to explore as a result. Combat in the game reverts to a turn based system upon seeing an enemy, rather than real-time, with the party capable of hitting a hostile only if they are in line-of-sight before them (i.e. in the grid space in front of them). Enemies cannot be hit diagonally but can be hit at range before they move in close to the party's position, which can influence how they move around to do so, while the size of an enemy unit determines how many can fit into a single grid space. While movement is permitted during combat, it can only be done so long as there is not an enemy in an adjacent space to the party; when they do, the party cannot move until all spaces around them are clear. Certain objects found in the game world can assist in battles by conferring a temporary benefit for a short period.

=== Skill and follower system ===
The game utilizes the same skill system as previous titles, since it debuted in Might and Magic VI and was then later improved upon in Might and Magic VII. Skills are divided in the game by type - Weapon, Armour, Magic and Miscellaneous - while a character's class determines the level-cap of expertise a skill can go to, and thus how high a rank it can be, in a similar manner to that of For Blood and Honor; while minor skills can go no further than Expert, secondary skills can improve up to Master, and primary skills can go as high as Grandmaster, thus a character in one class may be able to use bows at the Master level but a character in another class may not advance any further than an Expert level. As with previous titles, higher levels of expertise require a character to reach a certain rank and then find a teacher to train them higher, however they cannot progress further in rank beyond the rank-cap of their level of expertise until they have received training; if a character reaches Expert level for a skill that can later be a Master of, they must first be trained as an Expert before they can allocate more points to that skill.

While the follower system of previous games returns, it reverts to the original set-up prior to Might and Magic IX, in that followers confer benefits to the party, but do not fight for them. Only two followers can be with the party at any time, with each follower bestowing a benefit to the party for the duration with them (i.e. improving their combat skills), while taking a small fee when hired along with a percentage of the gold whilst with the party. Some followers are associated to specific quests, and are thus unable to leave until their associated quest is completed.

=== Changes and new features ===
One of the biggest changes in Might & Magic X comes from the setting of the game. Due to it being set in Ashan, the science fiction elements that have been the basis behind some of the storylines in previous games of the series are no longer included, yet references to previous titles are present in the game world for long-time fans (such as the name of the first town visited). Another change includes the use of a shared inventory space for the party, rather than characters each having an individual one like in previous titles. Legacy also saw a change in the way spells are learned; characters must now visit a library to learn a new spell, and can only acquire a new one depending on their level of magic skill expertise in any of the following schools of magic their class has access to: Fire, Water, Earth, Air, Light, Dark, Prime.

Alongside these changes and the major ones to major elements, the game brings in a few new features. A toolbar is now provided within the game that be used to hotkey items, spells or abilities for each character, depending on how the player wants them set up, while a much easier quest system is now used that provides updates when a quest is progressing well. A bestiary is now provided that details all of the creatures and enemies encountered during a play-through, with the addition of a lore section that provides back-stories on events, places, history, and so forth. Alongside a range of magic equipment that the party can use, players can uncover Relics, special pieces of equipment which, when equipped to a character (some depending on their skills), earn experience as if a member of the party and can thus earn improvements on earning enough to level up.

The game also during opendev phase included a modding kit, which should allow fans to create or modify content in the game. This functionality was however removed with release due to requirement of function present only in Pro version of Unity 3D.

== Story ==
=== Setting ===
Much of the game takes places on the Agyn Peninsula which is a part of the continent of Thallan, within the world of Ashan. The events of the game take place a few years after the war that occurred during Might & Magic Heroes VI, in which the city of Karthal, a colony of the Holy Falcon Empire, is now planning to secede from it. Alongside the city, the Peninsula also feature three major towns, vast plains, thick bogs, barren wastelands, coastal bays, tall mountains, thick forests, and a vast dungeon city beneath the land. At the beginning of the game, Karthal goes into turmoil and suffers a political coup as a result.

=== Plot ===
At the small town of Sorpigal-by-the-Sea, on the east coast of the Agyn Peninsula, a party of raiders arrive by ship on an important task - to bring their mentor's remains to the city of Karthal for burial. Upon stepping off their ship, they are met by a mysterious man named Dunstan, who reveals that Karthal recently closed itself off to outsiders in the aftermath of a major coup. Unable to gain entry until the city opens up, the raiders pass the time by aiding the town's garrison in dealing with a number of problems. Impressed with their work, the garrison's captain sends the raiders to Castle Portmeyron to meet with the Peninsula's new governor, Jon Morgan, only to find upon arrival that the castle is being besieged by bands of brigands and militia. Fighting their way through the castle against them, the group eventually rescue the governor, who soon asks them for their help to investigate a number of strange events that occurred recently in the region.

The raiders begin initially with investigation into a dark elf presence at the Elemental Forge - an ancient structure in the centre of the peninsula, housing elemental beings, in which they find themselves fighting off one such being that had been corrupted by an unknown force, freeing it in the process. After reporting back on what they found, Morgan soon sends them to the woods near the town of Seahaven, in order to meet with Lord Kilburn and ask for his help in identifying the handwriting of a message that was found after the attack on Portmeyron; Morgan also asks them to carry a letter to the pirate king, Crag Hack, so he can establish a truce with him. Learning from Kilburn that Montbard, the former governor of the region, had ordered the attack on Morgan's castle and is now hiding in the Lost City - an ancient and ruined underground city - the party quickly track him down and defeat him. While Morgan remains suspicious on how Montbard funded the attack on the castle, he soon sends the raiders to Karthal to find a man called Falagar, an ambassador who was working in secret with Morgan as a spy within the city. The party manage to gain entry via the city's sewers, just as it finally opens its gates to outsiders, while encountering Dunstan before he departs.

Inside the city, the raiders search for Falagar leads them to a man named Hamza, a former member of the insurrection within the city, now organizing a resistance movement against the person who organized it and rules over Karthal as a result - Markus Wolf. The group learn that his Black Guard, a ruthless mercenary group, took Falagar to a prison in the city's slums, and so quickly begin work on a plan to break him out. Upon freeing Falagar, they soon learn that Dunstan had been involved in the coup, although his reason for doing so is not made clear to them. Morgan, upon hearing of this, instructs the raiders to find out more about him, leading them to meeting a former raider friend of Dunstan's by the name of Shiva. During their meeting, Shiva reveals that she and Dunstan had been part of raider party, who had twelve years ago attempted to enter a dungeon known as the Tomb of a Thousand Terrors. However, something went badly wrong and of the party that entered, only she and Dunstan managed to escape the Tomb. While both separated soon afterwards, Shiva noticed that Dunstan had changed following the incident.

Heading to the Tomb for answers, the party soon find and enter the dungeon, only to be locked in by a mysterious dark elf they had met in the Forge. Inside, they encounter a variety of shadowy creatures and a group of dark elves, along with the discovery of Dunstan's corpse. This alerts the raiders that Shiva had left with an imposter; the real Dunstan had died in the tomb, after he and the other raiders accidentally broke the seal to the prison of a Faceless by the name of Erobos, a master of assassins who was imprisoned by his own kind after the Elder Wars. Erobos, released from his captivity, quickly stole Dunstan's identity and appearance, left him to die, and began devising a scheme shortly afterwards to get revenge for his imprisonment. The raiders soon learn that his intentions is to ignite a war on the Peninsula, explaining his presence in Karthal during Markus' coup, with the dark elf the party encountered being one of his servants, called Salvin.

Upon returning with their discovery, the party find that Morgan's daughter, Ann, was kidnapped by Markus to stop him interfering, but this has the opposite effect when he sends the raiders to inform Crag Hack of what was done. Crag, upon learning of Ann's capture, quickly offers his aid in attacking Karthal, bringing troops via his ship. During the fighting, the raiders quickly find and defeat Salvin (the player can tell him about Ann, causing him to commit suicide for his actions), before fighting against Markus, pursuing him into an ancient city beneath Karthal - Ker-Thall - whereupon they defeat him. Whilst in Ker-Thall, the group soon learn that Crag had died whilst fighting against Erobos, in the hopes that a noble death form such an action would counter a curse he had. Upon finding Erobos, the party quickly learns that he had influenced Markus in staging an insurrection in Karthal so as to fight back against the Falcon Empress and her plans for reform in the region, as well as also driving Montbard mad by making him think demons were running the Peninsula. While he had helped the party, it was purely to provide him with a formidable foe, although Erobos was unaware that the raiders had been secretly used by the Empire to oppose him. Despite countless minions of Faceless and dark elves being sent to kill them, the raiders finally defeat Erobos and end his plot, saving the Peninsula from disaster

== Development ==
After releasing a hidden teaser page on the official Might & Magic website on March 15, 2013, hinting at the possibility of a tenth title, Ubisoft released the official announcement trailer on YouTube on March 21, 2013 featuring tile based gameplay inspired by Might & Magic I-V. The voice of Sheltem (the primary antagonist of the first five games) can also be heard in the trailer.

In an interview before the game's launch the developers at Limbic claimed that although the game requires no "always-online" DRM, it does require usage of the UPlay system for a one-time activation of the game, in addition to the future updates and obtaining bonus in-game items. However, in 2021 Ubisoft shut down the game's servers making the game unplayable past act one and the expansion pack completely inaccessible. As a result, the game was delisted from digital storefronts a month after the shutdown.

In June 2013 Ubisoft announced open development with community. Limbic Entertainment team along with Ubisoft Chengdu were announced as game developers.

The game was at first released in August 2013 as a beta with only Act I accessible, though after some comments from community the dev team added new functions as well (map edits for example). Unity 3D game engine was chosen for the game and game was intended to be modifiable by community. This however required a function only available in Unity 3D Pro version, creating controversy between players, Ubisoft and Limbic dev team.

Full game was released on January 23, 2014. Day after release, the Ubisoft producer Gary Paulini, lead designer Julien Pirou and CEO of Limbic Stephan Winter did AMA on Reddit

A post-release patch added three dungeons to the game, one of them exclusive to owners of the Deluxe Edition. In March 2014, an expansion pack, The Falcon and the Unicorn was released.

On March 27, 2014, Ubisoft announced on devblog pages that there would be no further updates to the game. This left game with many unrepaired bugs.

Sometime during 2015 OpenDev page section on official Might and Magic X website was deleted and is currently giving Error 404. All pre-release (older than January 2014) open development articles were deleted from official game and Ubisoft pages as well.

In June 2021, the DRM servers responsible for a number of Ubisoft games including Might and Magic X were deactivated; players found that this rendered it impossible to proceed past the game's first act or play the DLC, as the game would attempt to authenticate itself and fail, prompting complaints that the game and its DLC were still available for sale but not playable. In July, Ubisoft delisted the game from online storefronts "until further notice". On October 20, Ubisoft announced the problems were resolved, and the games were relisted.

== Reception ==
Reception

Aggregate score
Aggregator	Score
Metacritic	71/100

Review scores
Publication	Score
Eurogamer	7/10
Game Informer	8.25/10
GameSpot	6/10
Joystiq	4/5
PC Gamer (US)	73/100

Might & Magic X: Legacy received generally mixed reviews gaining 71/100 points on Metacritic aggregating website. Richard Cobbett of PC Gamer found the tenth installment of Might & Magic to be, despite its shortcomings, a successful tribute to the retro-style of gaming, stating that "what gives Legacy its old school charm though is that as much as it's weighed down by an obviously low budget and the mechanical sacrifices of jumping back a decade, there's a love for its style underpinning the action." Daniel Tack of Game Informer also praised the throwback approach and allowing options to players, calling it "refreshing to be given the tools to set up potential failure in an industry that’s continually pushing toward 'Push a button during this quick time event to win.'" Rowan Kaiser of Joystiq, however, while praising retro-style also favorably compared its changes to the game's previous installments, noting that "where previous games could open too much, with wild swings in difficulty and horribly unbalanced character classes, M&M 10 feels exceptionally well-guided and controlled."

Brett Todd of GameSpot though criticized the story as not as developed, calling the opening in particular "as exciting as listening to someone recite a tax return". One other additional point of critique was that of Ubisoft's Uplay service with Eurogamer's Stace Harman writing that "unfortunately, not everything is gloriously old-school - as Ubisoft's insistence that the game authenticate through its Uplay platform attests. There's no perceptible benefit to the player in this, just the potential for more complication".

On Steam distribution product pages the game scores 63% on recent and 68% (out of 1931 reviews) on overall users recommending the game.
