= Lost World =

Lost world is a subgenre of the fantasy or science fiction genres.

Lost World, The Lost World or Lost Worlds may also refer to:

== Arts and entertainment ==
=== Arthur Conan Doyle novel and adaptations ===
- The Lost World (Doyle novel), 1912
- The Lost World (1925 film), a silent film set in South America
- Lost World (manga), by Osamu Tezuka, 1948
- The Lost World (1960 film), set in Venezuela
- The Lost World (1992 film), set in Africa
- The Lost World (1998 film), set in Mongolia
- The Lost World (2001 film), a BBC film
- The Lost World (TV series), or Sir Arthur Conan Doyle's The Lost World
- "The Lost World", a radio drama in the Radio Tales series

=== Michael Crichton novel and adaptations ===
- The Lost World (Crichton novel), 1995
- The Lost World: Jurassic Park, a 1997 film
  - The Lost World: Jurassic Park (film score)
  - The Lost World: Jurassic Park (arcade game)
  - The Lost World: Jurassic Park (console game)
- The Lost World: Jurassic Park (handheld game)
- The Lost World: Jurassic Park (Sega Genesis game)
- The Lost World: Jurassic Park (pinball)
- Chaos Island: The Lost World, a video game

=== Other uses in arts and entertainment ===
==== Film and television ====
- Lost Worlds (TV series), a History Channel documentary series
- Il mondo perduto ('The lost world'), a compilation of short documentary films by Vittoria De Seta

==== Gaming ====
- Forgotten Worlds (known as Lost Worlds in Japan), a 1988 arcade game
- The Lost World, a 1998 role-playing game for MSX2
- The History Channel: Lost Worlds, a Mac game, 2008
- Ricochet Lost Worlds, a video game
- Sonic Lost World, a 2013 video game
- Lost World (pinball), a pinball machine

==== Literature ====
- Lost Worlds (Carter short story collection), 1980
- Lost Worlds (Smith short story collection), 1944
- Lost Worlds (gamebook), by Alfred Leonardi, 1983
- The Lost World, a poetry collection by Randall Jarrell

==== Music ====
- The Lost World, a 2009 album by Pull Tiger Tail

== Places ==
- Lost World Caverns, West Virginia, U.S.

== See also ==
- List of lost lands
- List of mythological places
- Lost city
