= Might and Magic V: Darkside of Xeen =

1993 video game

- Developer: New World Computing
- Publisher: New World Computing
- Director: Jon Van Caneghem
- Programmers: Mark Caldwell; David Hathaway
- Composers: Tim Tully (PC); Greg Alper (PC-uncredited); Takeshi Abo (PC-uncredited, PC98, FMT)
- Series: Might and Magic
- Platforms: MS-DOS, Mac, FM Towns, NEC PC-9801
- Release: 1993
- Genre: Role-playing
- Mode: Single-player

Might and Magic V: Darkside of Xeen (originally released as Might and Magic: Darkside of Xeen) is a science fantasy role-playing video game published and developed for multiple platforms by New World Computing in 1993. Based on the Might and Magic III: Isles of Terra game engine, it is the fifth game in the Might and Magic series, and is a direct sequel to Might and Magic IV: Clouds of Xeen, concluding the story arc started in the original Might and Magic Book One: The Secret of the Inner Sanctum.

Like its predecessors, it was well received by both critics and players for its large game world and graphics, and was among the earliest games to make use of both animated cutscenes and PCM sound-based speech. Its unique integration mechanic with the game world of Clouds of Xeen, allowing both games to be played in a combined format – World of Xeen – was considered revolutionary at the time.

== Gameplay ==
A typical screenshot

Might and Magic V uses a game engine based on that used by Might and Magic III: Isles of Terra, and the general gameplay is therefore similar. Because it is designed to be played alongside Might and Magic IV, with characters that have obtained some levels and other enhancements through play in Clouds of Xeen, gameplay is considerably more challenging for starting characters.

== Plot ==
Darkside of Xeen concludes the story arc started by Might and Magic Book One: The Secret of the Inner Sanctum – the interstellar campaign against the Ancients' renegade creation, Sheltem. Picking up where Clouds of Xeen left off, the adventurers take King Burlock's advice and follow Prince Roland's trail to the other side of the world, where they find the rogue Guardian of Terra has already conquered its inhabitants, under the pseudonym of "Alamar" (the name of the king he impersonated on VARN in Might and Magic I).

Meanwhile, the Guardian of the Darkside – the Dragon Pharaoh – contacts his rebel allies one by one, discovering that all have been imprisoned or converted to Sheltem's cause. In a desperate gambit, the Pharaoh sends a dragon hatchling into the night skies of the Darkside, carrying a command orb holding some of his power. The hatchling is killed in flight by a magical bolt, directed by Sheltem, from his castle. The orb survives its fall to earth and is discovered by the adventurers. Passing through the city of Castleview, they scale the tower of the elven wizard Ellinger Hofenhager, an ally to the Pharaoh.

Because Alamar moved Castle Kalindra, seat of power to the eponymous Queen of the Darkside, out of phase with the physical realm, Ellinger instructs the adventurers to gather enough energy discs to power a spell capable of restoring it to reality. They travel the realms of the Darkside, liberating the city of Sandcaster from Alamar's sorcerer agents Morgana and Xenoc, collecting discs along the way. With Castle Kalindra restored by Ellinger, the heroes enter, only to find that Queen Kalindra has been defeated and captured by one of Alamar's minions, the vampire Count Blackfang.

Invading Castle Blackfang with the aid of the knight Ambrose and his griffin, the adventurers slay the Count only to find Kalindra has been turned into a vampire. They restore her from undeath using her lost crown's powers, and with her aid are able to reach the Ancients' pyramid where the Dragon Pharaoh resides. After they return the Pharaoh his command orb, he explains that Alamar holds the Ancients' Cube of Power, which enables him to direct the dual-sided nacelle world of XEEN (Xylonite Experimental Environment Nacelle) through the Void. Using the Cube, he plans to land Xeen on his homeworld, Terra, and continue his rampage against the empire of the Ancients.

The Pharaoh reveals that when Alamar fell to Xeen in his "shooting star" (in actuality an escape pod), a second pod also landed, but was snared in the volcanic mountains of the northeast. Investigating this second pod, the adventurers discover Corak, Sheltem's nemesis from Might and Magic II and III. Corak instructs them to somehow teleport him into Castle Alamar so that he can put an end to his old enemy once and for all. The Dragon Pharaoh leads them to the airborne city of Olympus, where they obtain a Soul Box.

Transferring Corak's essence into the Soul Box, they fight their way to Castle Alamar and, battling Sheltem's hordes, manage to reach his throne room. Casting the Soul Box inside, they retreat as Corak emerges to battle his old foe, though the two are evenly matched. After a destructive skirmish, Corak is defeated, but compels Sheltem towards him and sacrifices himself, initiating their dual self-destruct command. The resulting explosion of power destroys both Guardians along with Castle Alamar, bringing the threat of Sheltem to a bittersweet end.

== World of Xeen ==
World of Xeen CD box cover

If Might and Magic IV and V are installed on the same system, they can be combined into a single game where the player party can travel between the two sides of Xeen. The combined game contains all of the content from IV and V, as well some additional quests, and is known as World of Xeen. In 1994, NWC released an enhanced World of Xeen CD, which expanded the amount of digital speech in the game. The Macintosh version was developed by Presage Software.

The combined World of Xeen game contains a series of additional quests providing an epilogue to the events of Might and Magic IV and V. After Sheltem is defeated the party is summoned to the Ancients' pyramid by the Dragon Pharaoh to complete the quest that Prince Roland had been on all along: the uniting of the two sides of Xeen into a single, continuous world. Once the remaining quest lines are completed, Roland and Queen Kalindra are wed in a ceremony that invokes the world's transformation.

MacUser named World of Xeen one of the top 50 CD-ROMs of 1995, and gave it a score of 3.5 out of 5.

== Swords of Xeen ==
Swords of Xeen is a bonus game in the 1995 Might and Magic Trilogy compilation (the trilogy refers to Might and Magic III, IV, and V). It was developed by Catware. Subsequently, it was also included in several series anthologies. The game was never published in standalone form.

The game began as a mod based on the Might and Magic V engine. Personalities from Catware were responsible for leading the modding effort, with story contributions from Ellen Beeman. As development progressed, collaboration with New World Computing was established, and the mod received publishing support. Swords of Xeen exploits some quirks of the engine to great effect, such as morphing monsters by using the regular animation of one monster and the attack animation of another. The game also contains bugs in scripting, which allow the player to bypass many encounters by walking sideways.

Swords of Xeen takes place on an entirely new world that is under attack by 'The Source', which claims to be the genius behind Alamar, the main enemy of Might and Magic V.

The game's graphics and sound, which had not changed from Might and Magic V, were dated. However, the game was praised for its gameplay, receiving a 4/5 from one review.

== Reception ==
Computer Gaming World's Scorpia wrote in 1993 that Darkside had "almost trivially easy" puzzles, criticizing some as "pointless and boring", but nonetheless concluded that the game "is a satisfactory conclusion to the current Might & Magic saga". She advised players to install and play Darkside and Clouds together for "the most enjoyment", and stated that the game was "a must for those who have followed the series since its inception". Darkside of Xeen was a runner-up for Computer Gaming World's Role-Playing Game of the Year award in June 1994, losing to Betrayal at Krondor. The editors called it "the most impressive linking of two CRPGs in computer game history" and "a major step in the advancement of virtual world building".

Might & Magic: The World of Xeen (comprising Clouds of Xeen and Dark Side of Xeen) was reviewed in 1994 in Dragon #201 by Sandy Petersen in the "Eye of the Monitor" column. Petersen gave the compilation 3 out of 5 stars. In April 1994 Computer Gaming World said that the CD version's "enhancements make it the preferred choice". In CD-ROM Today, Neil Randall praised the World of Xeen compilation as "fun, consistent, and addictive." He awarded it 4 out of 5 stars.
