= Warriors of Might and Magic =

2000 video game

- North American PlayStation 2 cover art
- Developer: The 3DO Company
- Publisher: The 3DO Company
- Directors: Aric Wilmunder; Joshua M. Cloud; Howard Lehr
- Series: Might and Magic
- Platforms: PlayStation, Game Boy Color, PlayStation 2
- Release: NA: December 5, 2000 (PS); NA: December 22, 2000 (GBC); NA: March 21, 2001 (PS2); EU: April 6, 2001
- Genre: Action RPG
- Mode: Single-player

Warriors of Might and Magic is an action role-playing game developed and released by The 3DO Company for the PlayStation and Game Boy Color in 2000, and for PlayStation 2 in 2001. The three versions, although they all follow a similar storyline, are unique, especially the GBC version which is presented in 2D instead of 3D and has an almost completely different story. Each version of the game centers around the protagonist Alleron, who is wrongfully accused of committing necromancy by the Grand Inquisitor, and is exiled as a result. He is forced to wear the Mask of the Accused as a punishment for his crimes, which acts as a magnet to monsters. It is difficult to determine when the events of Warriors of Might and Magic take place in the Might and Magic timeline. However, it's speculated that it takes place in between Heroes of Might and Magic III and Heroes of Might and Magic IV.

== Development ==
Development started soon after Crusaders of Might and Magic had been completed. The team learned from their mistakes and wished to create a bigger and better game, however development was troubled as the team often clashed with The 3DO company.

The game initially started development as a sequel to Crusaders of Might and Magic, however since Crusaders performed poorly in sales, 3DO opted to start with a new fresh idea. They thought that a new name and a new character might redeem their spinoff in the eyes of the fans, which would lead to better sales.

Early screenshots of the game show it played from a first-person perspective; However, this did not sit well with the marketing team at 3DO and this version was scrapped in favor of an action game due to marketing. 3DO's marketing team ordered specific alterations to be made to what was then Crusaders of Might and Magic 2, this resulted in the creation of Warriors of Might and Magic.

The PC version did exist at some point; it was expected to be released on November 27, 2000 and would have followed the plot of the PS2 game and featured better graphics. It had been worked on and was approximately half way done, but was ultimately scrapped for unknown reasons.

The game's marketing utilized music from the Brazilian rock band Sepultura, as the track "Ratamahatta" can be heard in Warriors of Might and Magic.

When creating the story, the developers were interested in depicting the origin of the Ancients and Kreegans that appeared in previous Might and Magic games and attempted to recover continuity with the Might and Magic series. This was done by selecting enemies and spells that had appeared in previous iterations of the Might and Magic series of games.

== Reception ==
Reception

Aggregate scores
Aggregator	Score		
Aggregator	GBC	PS	PS2
GameRankings	50%	61%	49%
Metacritic	N/A	N/A	49/100

Review scores
Publication	Score		
Publication	GBC	PS	PS2
AllGame	N/A	2/5	2/5
Electronic Gaming Monthly	N/A	N/A	2.17/10 (Note: Three critics of Electronic Gaming Monthly gave the PlayStation 2 version each a score of 1.5/10, 3/10, and 2/10.)
Famitsu	N/A	N/A	26/40
Game Informer	N/A	N/A	7.75/10
GameRevolution	N/A	N/A	C
GameSpot	N/A	N/A	3.6/10
GameSpy	N/A	N/A	67%
IGN	3/10	5/10	5/10
Next Generation	N/A	N/A	2/5
Nintendo Power	2.5/5	N/A	N/A
Official U.S. PlayStation Magazine	N/A	3/5	2.5/5

The PlayStation 2 version received "generally unfavorable reviews" according to the review aggregation website Metacritic. Norman Chido of NextGen said, "Neither pretty nor especially fluid to control, Warriors isn't the step up from the awful Crusaders we'd hoped for." In Japan, where the same PS2 version was ported and published by Success on May 23, 2002, Famitsu gave it a score of 26 out of 40. Jake The Snake of GamePro, however, called it "a decent action/RPG that will mildly entertain tolerant gamers looking for a sword-swinging adventure." (Note: GamePro gave the PlayStation 2 version two 3.5/5 scores for graphics and fun factor, and two 3/5 scores for sound and control.)

== Sequel ==
The game (in its versions for the PS and PS2) was followed by a direct sequel titled Shifters, released for the PlayStation 2 in 2002. It follows the ending of both versions, taking place soon after their endings.
