= Might and Magic III: Isles of Terra =

1991 role-playing video game

- MS-DOS cover art
- Developer: New World Computing (Note: Ported to SNES by Iguana Entertainment;Ported to Macintosh by Presage Software)
- Publisher: New World Computing
- Director: Jon Van Caneghem
- Programmer: Mark Caldwell
- Artist: Louis Johnson
- Series: Might and Magic
- Platforms: MS-DOS, Amiga, Mac OS, FM Towns, PC-9801, Sega CD, TurboGrafx-CD, Super NES
- Release: 1991
- Genre: Role-playing
- Mode: Single-player

Might and Magic III: Isles of Terra is the third game in the role-playing video game series Might and Magic. Released in 1991, it is the predecessor to Might and Magic IV: Clouds of Xeen and the sequel to Might and Magic II: Gates to Another World. A Sega Genesis version was developed, but never released.

This was the last installment in the series to be released for the Amiga, Mac OS, Sega CD, TurboGrafx-CD and Super NES.

== Gameplay ==
Might and Magic III employs an updated first person perspective interface based on the one employed by Might and Magic Book One: The Secret of the Inner Sanctum and Might and Magic II: Gates to Another World. The action is turn based throughout the game phases. A number of improvements, made possible by an expanded development team and advancements in computer technology, are incorporated. The graphics are more colourful, taking advantage of contemporary VGA displays. A number of sound cards are supported, offering improved sound effects, background music, and synthesized speech. Mouse interaction is also supported for the first time.

A typical Might and Magic III gameplay screen from Fountain Head, the game's starting town. (Super NES version)

Textual character summaries in the lower portion of the screen are replaced with a graphical head-up display, featuring the faces of the player characters, which wear different expressions depending on the condition of the character. Spells are selected from a list: an improvement on previous games where they had to be specified using numeric codes. Level maps were no longer limited to a 16 x 16 grid, and an automapping function eliminated the need for drawing maps on paper. Also, enemy creatures can now be seen as they approach, or are approached, from distant squares. In previous games the enemy creatures were only detected when they were in the same square as the player characters, which made combat more difficult to avoid. The ability to shoot at a distance also gives ranged weapons a more distinct tactical advantage. At the end of combat, players do not have to "search" for loot as in previous games.

The player can save the game state at almost any time, with the notable exceptions of the Arena and Castle Greywind Dungeon, at which the player cannot store game state. In previous games, saving was accomplished by visiting an inn and signing the registry. Saving the game also records that enemy creatures have been killed; in previous games traveling to a level from an inn fully populates the former with monsters every time.

== Plot ==
After the defeat of Sheltem and his forces on CRON in Might and Magic II: Gates to Another World, a new party of adventurers from Sheltem's "homeworld" of Terra find themselves embroiled in the battle between the two Guardians. The adventurers must aid the mysterious Corak in attempting to stop Sheltem once again and putting an end to his evil machinations. In canon, these adventurers are named Sir Caneghem, Crag Hack, Maximus, Resurrectra, Dark Shade, Kastore, Robert the Wise and Tolberti. (Note: These are the names of the default party, and the same names are given for those characters in Might and Magic VII: For Blood and Honor.)

Throughout the game, the adventurers travel the Isles of Terra, a grouping of separate, flat "nacelle" worlds drawn from the Void onto the oceanic planet of Terra by Sheltem himself in previous years. Driven against the Ancients, Sheltem is now launching their nacelles into the suns of various worlds, snuffing out countless lives in his wake. (Note: "Corak: Log Entry 7: VARN 6 launched itself into the sun today on Sheltem's command. A hundred thousand lives snuffed out in a matter of minutes. The magnitude of his crime is overwhelming, and the fact that I was unable to stop him lends my mission a sense of desperation and urgency that it lacked before. Where Sheltem was merely a nuisance before the disaster, he is now a terrible menace that must be stopped at any cost. I MUST find him.") Driven by the tales told in Corak's journals regarding the Ancients, the Elemental Lords and the "Forces of the Dome", the heroes pursue the Guardians, battling terrors along the way.

Finally, the heroes enter the so-called "Maze from Hell" and earn the title of "Ultimate Adventurers" from the maze's defenses. Uncovering revelations about Terra's past, they gain access to the Pyramids of the Ancients, stumbling upon what is named a 'Main Control Center'. They find themselves within the underwater seedship originally used by the Ancients in centuries past to colonize Terra with human life before its submersion beneath the waves.

At the game's conclusion, Sheltem pilots an escape pod within the underwater ship and sets off for the nacelle of Xeen, with Corak in close pursuit. After departing, Corak hastily contacts the adventurers from his escape pod, instructing them in the means of matter transferral to land the seedship—named the "Lincoln"—safely. (Note: "Corak: Log Entry 15: Xeen approaches. I will have to engage the ship stasis fields in order to survive the impact. Since I will be right behind Sheltem, I stand a good chance of capturing him after impact. Nav computers predict that the Terrans will not impact the project but will instead burn up in the atmosphere. I have instructed them on the use of the matter transfer device aboard their seedship so that they may escape its destruction. I am going into stasis now. May the Gods smile upon me.") They set off to pursue Corak and Sheltem in the Lincoln, and it is implied that they actually do so in Might and Magic IV: Clouds of Xeen. However, they did in fact drift off-course and are next seen as powerful non-player characters in Might and Magic VII: For Blood and Honor.

== Development ==
The Macintosh version of the game was developed by Presage Software.

== Reception ==
Reception

Review scores
Publication	Score
Dragon	5/5
Electronic Gaming Monthly	6/10 (SNES)

Computer Gaming World's Johnny L. Wilson in 1991 stated that the game would appeal to both new and experienced Might & Magic players. Charles Ardai reviewed the game for Computer Gaming World, and stated that "Might and Magic III: Isles of Terra is a stunning new implementation of venerable concepts that should please the majority of its intended audience." In 1992 the magazine named it as one of the year's best role-playing games, citing "its new graphic look, use of sound and challenging play". The magazine's Scorpia was also positive, writing in 1993 that Might & Magic III was "a big improvement in the series, and worth playing". The game was reviewed in 1992 in Dragon #177 by Hartley, Patricia, and Kirk Lesser in "The Role of Computers" column.

Jim Trunzo reviewed Might and Magic III in White Wolf #30 (Feb., 1992), rating it a 4 out of 5 and stated that "Might and Magic III leaves few stones unturned. The game includes automapping, a liberal 'save' feature not found in M&M I or II, a wide choice of spells and weapons, and a huge fantasy world filled with combat and puzzles. Easy to play but difficult to win, Might and Magic III makes a quantum leap forward from prior versions."

Reviewing the SNES version, Mike Weigand of Electronic Gaming Monthly said it was "a decent RPG with ... a solid story line and excellent music, but the interface is poor. Although the scrolling is true to PC, the step-by-step frame can get to you after a while."

In 1994, PC Gamer US named Might & Magic III as the 25th best computer game ever. The editors called it "one of role-playing's most engrossing adventures."
