= Kaijū Monogatari =

1988 video game

- Developer(s): Birthday
- Publisher(s): Namco
- Series: Kaijū Monogatari
- Platform(s): Family Computer
- Release: JP: November 18, 1988
- Genre(s): Role-playing video game
- Mode(s): Single-player

Kaijū Monogatari (Note: Japanese: 貝獣物語, "Shell Monsters Story") is a role-playing video game developed by Birthday and published by Namco for the Family Computer, in November 1988 in Japan. It was followed up by Daikaijū Monogatari on the Super Famicom.
