= Twin Princess of Wonder Planet =

Japanese anime television series

- Poomo (top-left), Front row: Rein (left), Fine (bottom-right); Middle back: Leonne

ふしぎ星の☆ふたご姫 (Fushigiboshi no Futagohime)
- Genre: Magical girl
- Created by: Birthday
- Manga

Fushigiboshi no Futagohime: Lovely Kingdom
- Written by: Birthday
- Illustrated by: Mayuki Anan
- Published by: Shogakukan
- English publisher: SG: Chuang Yi
- Imprint: Ciao Comics
- Magazine: Ciao
- Original run: January 2005 – January 2006
- Volumes: 2
- Anime television series
- Directed by: Junichi Sato (chief); Shogo Koumoto
- Produced by: Shōko Morimura; Tomoko Takahashi
- Written by: Rika Nakase
- Music by: Kōtarō Nakagawa
- Studio: Hal Film Maker
- Original network: TXN (TV Tokyo)
- Original run: April 2, 2005 – March 25, 2006
- Episodes: 51
- Anime television series

Fushigiboshi no Futagohime Gyu!
- Directed by: Junichi Sato (chief); Shogo Koumoto
- Produced by: Tomoko Gushima; Aya Yoshino; Tomoko Takahashi
- Written by: Rika Nakase
- Music by: Kōtarō Nakagawa
- Studio: Hal Film Maker
- Original network: TXN (TV Tokyo)
- Original run: April 1, 2006 – March 31, 2007
- Episodes: 52
- Video game

Stylebook: Fushigiboshi no Futagohime Gyu!
- Publisher: Bandai
- Genre: Productivity
- Platform: Nintendo DS
- Released: March 23, 2006
- icon

Twin Princess of Wonder Planet (ふしぎ星の☆ふたご姫, Fushigiboshi no Futagohime) is a 2005 Japanese anime television series conceptualized by Birthday and produced by Nihon Ad Systems and TV Tokyo, with animation from Hal Film Maker.

A manga adaptation titled Twin Princess of Wonder Planet: Lovely Kingdom by Mayuki Anan ran in Ciao to promote the series, which was licensed in English by Chuang Yi for Southeast Asian distribution. After the series' conclusion, it was followed up with a sequel titled Twin Princess of Wonder Planet Gyu! in 2006.

== Plot ==
=== Twin Princess of Wonder Planet ===
The Wonder Planet is inhabited by seven kingdoms, all of them supported by the Sun's Blessing from the Sunny Kingdom. However, unbeknownst to them, the Sun's Blessing is about to go out soon and the Wonder Planet will soon be covered in darkness. The twin princesses of the Sunny Kingdom, Fine and Rein, learn about the Wonder Planet's decline from Princess Grace, the legendary princess from the Sunny Kingdom who had saved the Sun's Blessing years ago. Grace sends Poomo, a fairy, to guide them as she gives them the power of the Prominence, which allows them to use magic that will allow them to save the Sun's Blessing. Meanwhile, Fine and Rein begin attending Princess Parties, prestigious contests between all of the princesses of each kingdom.

=== Twin Princess of Wonder Planet Gyu! ===
Fine, Rein, and the other princesses and princes leave the Wonder Planet to attend the Royal Wonder Academy, to earn their certifications to become the kings and queens of their kingdoms. However, Fine and Rein are shocked to discover that the school discourages friendship. During the school orientation, the vice principal presents the Soleil Bell, which will only ring if the chosen Universal Princess touches it. When Fine and Rein accidentally touch it, the Soleil Bell chooses them as the next Universal Princesses, awakening fairies Pyupyu and Kyukyu to aid them and giving them magic that will allow them to stop the power of the Black Crystal Planet threatening the universe.

== Development ==
Birthday, the original designers of the Wonder Planet and the characters, launched a concept webpage in 2003 in hopes of marketing their ideas to companies. Nihon Ad Systems and TV Tokyo adopted the idea a year later.

== Media ==
=== Anime ===
Twin Princess of Wonder Planet aired on TV Tokyo from April 2, 2005, to March 25, 2006. The opening theme song is "Princess wa Akiramenai" by Flip-Flap, a twin sister duo. The ending theme song is "Oshare Fantasy" by Fine Rein, consisting of voice actresses Megumi Kojima and Yuko Goto, who provide the voices of Fine and Rein in the show. Throughout the series' run, the production crew held Princess Party events in real life to promote the show, offering collectable keychains with crests of the seven kingdoms.

After the show's run, it was followed up by a direct sequel titled Twin Princess of Wonder Planet Gyu!, which aired on TV Tokyo from April 1, 2006, to March 31, 2007. The opening theme song is "Kimi no Ashita" by Flip-Flap, which charted at #55 on Oricon. The first ending theme song is "Gakuen Tengoku", and the second ending theme song is "Churuchu Rock!", with both songs performed by Wonder 5. "Gakuen Tengoku" charted at #90 on Oricon. Gyu! also featured the insert song "Miracle Gemini Gyu!" by Flip-Flap, which appeared as the B-side on the "Kimi no Ashita" single.

=== Manga ===
A manga adaptation of the series drawn by Mayuki Anan began serialization in the April 2005 issue of Ciao during the first series' run. The chapters were later released in 2 bound volumes by Shogakukan under the Ciao Comics imprint. The manga was licensed in English for Southeast Asian distribution by Chuang Yi.

No.	Title	Original release date	English release date
1	Twin Princess of Wonder Planet Vol. 01; Fushigiboshi no Futagohime: Raburī Kingudamu 1 (ふしぎ星の☆ふたご姫 ～ラブリーキングダム～ 1)	November 29, 2005; 978-4091302694	2006; 981-269-206-1
2	Twin Princess of Wonder Planet Vol. 02; Fushigiboshi no Futagohime: Raburī Kingudamu 2 (ふしぎ星の☆ふたご姫 ～ラブリーキングダム～ 2)	March 1, 2006; 978-4091303035	2007; 981-269-304-1

=== DS Software ===
An electronic organizer software for the Nintendo DS, titled Style Book: Fushigiboshi no Futagohime Gyu! (スタイルブック ふしぎ星の☆ふたご姫Gyu!, Sutairu Bukku Fushigiboshi no Futagohime Gyu!) was released on March 26, 2006, as part of the Style Book DS planner series produced by Bandai.
