= Shifters =

2002 video game

- North American box art
- Developer: The 3DO Company
- Publisher: The 3DO Company
- Director: Josh Cloud
- Producer: Robert Daly
- Designers: Erik Robson; Justin Mateo; Fred Selker; Colin Minson; Kai Craig; John Cloud
- Programmer: Sean Craig
- Artists: Stuart Elkington; Shao Wei Liu; Eric Chyn; Ian Castaneda
- Composer: Barry Blum
- Series: Might and Magic
- Platform: PlayStation 2
- Release: EU: April 26, 2002; NA: June 17, 2002; AU: 2002
- Genre: Action RPG
- Mode: Single-player

Shifters, also known as Shifters of Might and Magic, is a 2002 action role-playing game developed and published by The 3DO Company for the PlayStation 2. Set in the fictional Might and Magic universe, it is a direct sequel to the PlayStation 2 incarnation of Warriors of Might and Magic.

== Gameplay ==
The player controls Alleron, the lead character from Warriors of Might and Magic. Alleron must defeat a horde of flesh and metal invaders who are replacing villages with steam-powered cities. Unlike the previous game, Alleron has gained the power to shapeshift and can assume 24 different creature forms, such as a humanoid ram and a griffin-style creature.

Alleron travels through six different worlds in which he must battle with members of that world's race, often ending in a boss battle. During the game, there are secret areas that are only accessible to particular shapeshift forms. However, the main game can always be completed no matter the choice of form.

The combat system has different attacks based on the current form and weapon. Different forms and weapons have different attack combinations, some of which can send enemies flying. Some forms come with a different spell than other forms. Some spells can be used to gain access to previously inaccessible areas which often have secrets or treasure. Spells useful for combat also can be gained, creating more favorable circumstances in certain combat areas.

== Reception ==
Reception

Aggregate score
Aggregator	Score
Metacritic	37/100

Review scores
Publication	Score
Electronic Gaming Monthly	3/10
Game Informer	6.75/10
GameRevolution	D
GameSpot	3.9/10
GameSpy	37%
GameZone	5.9/10
IGN	4/10
Official U.S. PlayStation Magazine	1/5

The game received unfavorable reviews according to the review aggregation website Metacritic.

IGN reviewed the game, calling it a "game of a great many disparate parts, all of them widely varying in quality, somehow stuffed together into a single, highly unwieldy package [...] It's not an entirely bad game, in other words, but the good bits are like needles lost in the giant haystack of the ones that aren't so good."
