= Might and Magic VII: For Blood and Honor =

1999 video game

- Developer: New World Computing
- Publisher: 3DO
- Director: Keith Francart
- Producer: Peter Ryu
- Designers: James W. Dickinson; Bryan Farina; Paul Rattner; Jon Van Caneghem
- Programmer: Robert Young
- Artist: John Slowsky
- Composer: Paul Romero
- Series: Might and Magic
- Platform: Windows
- Release: NA: June 8, 1999; EU: June 25, 1999
- Genre: Role-playing
- Mode: Single player

Might and Magic VII: For Blood and Honor is a 1999 role-playing video game for Windows published by 3DO and developed by New World Computing as part of the science fantasy series Might and Magic; it was re-released in 2011 on GOG.com. The game follows on from both the events of Might and Magic VI: The Mandate of Heaven and those of Heroes of Might and Magic III: The Restoration of Erathia. Players form a party of four characters who win a castle in a scavenger hunt and soon become embroiled in political events on the continent of Antagarich, on the world of Enroth, before eventually choosing one of two paths and working alongside a number of characters whose storyline continues on from the events of Might and Magic III: Isles of Terra. The sequel to For Blood and Honor is Might and Magic VIII: Day of the Destroyer.

== Gameplay ==
While much of the gameplay remains the same as it was in The Mandate of Heaven, a few improvements and changes were made to a number of prominent parts of the game. Character creation in Blood and Honor received an update from its predecessor by now allowing players to choose a race for each character - Dwarf, Elf, Goblin or Human - while also adding in three new classes to choose from alongside the pre-existing ones - Thief, Monk and Ranger. The skill system also received a major change, with the inclusion of new skills and a new level of expertise - Grandmaster - but also becoming more restrictive than that of the previous title; a character's class not only determines what skills they can learn but now also puts a cap on the level of expertise it can be trained to, meaning that while a Thief could become a Master of the Sword skill, a Knight can train the skill up to Grandmaster. The change to the skill system, also affects the Magic system of the game, in that while some spells have been removed and new ones included, a character's level of expertise in a school of magic determines what spells can be learned, with weaker spells gaining more bonuses upon training to higher levels of expertise; an example of this new system comes with the "Fly" spell, which only Masters of Air Magic can learn, but who can gain the benefit of not draining magic points upon attaining Grandmaster of Air. Along with these changes, the game includes an update to the graphical appearances of enemy sprites, character models and items.

Beside the changes, the game features new additions. The first is the inclusion of making two notable choices, in regards to the political conflict between the elves and humans within the story. While one choice encountered is entirely optional but can determine the fate of their party's realm if completed within a set time limit, the other has a more profound impact on the story and is mandatory; the player has to make a decision on this choice in order to progress in the game's story. This ultimate choice, in regards to finding a successor to Harmondale's Arbiter (the game's version of the Seer from the previous title), defines which path - Light or Dark - the party takes for the rest of the game, affecting certain aspects. Along with a minor but permanent change of colour on the game display (white for Light, black for Dark), a number of additional quests become available for their chosen alignment, while the city of that respective path is friendly to the party and their rival is not; if Light is chosen, guards in all Darkness-aligned towns become hostile towards the player and vice versa. One major noticeable effect of this choice comes down to the Promotion quest system; while characters can earn a promotion to a more advanced tier of their chosen class without taking a path, proceeding to the second and final tier does requires such a choice, effectively leaving such promotions unavailable until later in the game, while determining what sort of quest they get in order to earn it and the title they receive as a result. For example, a Paladin who becomes a Crusader can later become either a Hero if they choose the Light path or a Villain if they chose the Dark path.

The other major addition to the game is the minigame of Arcomage, which is tied into two side-quests, in which players have to obtain a set of Arcomage cards and then play the game in all of the taverns in Antagarich. When playing the minigame, both sides having their towers pre-set to a certain height, are given a wall, and then achieve one of two specific victory conditions set out by each tavern: either get a tower to a certain height, or destroy your opponent's tower. Players take turns to either play a card, or discard it, until one side achieves victory via one of the conditions set out.

== Story ==
=== Setting ===
The game takes place on the world of Enroth, across the continent of Antagarich. The continent is divided up into several regions, including the elven lands of AvLee and Tularean Forest, the barrens of Deyja which house the necromancer stronghold of The Pit, the swamps and snow-capped mountains of Tatalia, the Bracada desert and cloud city of Celeste, Mount Nighon, the islands of Emerald Isle and Evernmorn, the dwarven lands of the Barrow Downs, the human kingdom of Erathia, and the realm of Harmondale. By the time the game starts, the aftermath of the war in Heroes of Might and Magic III has left the elves of AvLee and the humans of Erathia in a political dispute on the boundaries of Harmondale, with tensions slowly increasing.

=== Plot ===
Following the events of Might and Magic III, where they comprised the player party, the eight heroes of Terra - Sir Caneghem, Crag Hack, Maximus, Resurectra, Dark Shade, Kastore, Robert the Wise and Tolberti - attempted to pilot a seedship known as the Lincoln in pursuit of the Guardians, Corak and Sheltem, who were en route for the world of Xeen. However, an unknown problem occurred that caused the Terrans to drift off-course and eventually crash-land in the seas near Antagarich, on Planet Enroth. At around the same time, two war parties, one of elves and the other of goblins, break off fighting each other when the heroes emerge from the sea in wetsuits. Both sides witness the eight "sea monsters" arguing before eventually splitting up into two separate parties of four each and departing. While the elves report what they saw to Gavin Magnus, the immortal Grand Vizier of Bracada, the goblins report the same thing to Archibald Ironfist, who is now the leader of the Necromancers' Guild of Deyja. The brother of King Roland, Archibald fled from the continent-kingdom Enroth (same name as the planet) to Antagarich when the adventurers of Might and Magic VI liberated him from petrification. Intrigued with what they hear, both leaders order a search for the strange beings.

Meanwhile, on Emerald Isle, the wealthy Lord Markham organises a scavenger hunt for adventurers, with first prize being the deed to Castle Harmondale on the mainland and its surrounding township. A new party of four player characters takes up the challenge and wins the competition, becoming the new Lords of Harmondale, only to discover upon arriving to their new home that the castle has fallen into a dreadful state of dilapidation. After clearing out some goblins and rats, and getting help from Hothfarr IX, king of the dwarves of Stone City, to repair their castle, the new Lords soon return to their restored castle only to find diplomats waiting for them, representing the human kingdom of Erathia and the elven kingdom of AvLee. Both envoys ask the party to meet their kingdom's leader: King Eldrich Parson of the elves of AvLee and Queen Catherine Ironfist of the humans of Erathia. Through them, the party learn why Markham was offering Harmondale as a prize; unbeknownst to them, their new home lay in disputed territory that both AvLee and Erathia had made a claim on, which has now resulted in skirmishes between the two kingdoms, despite the efforts of an Arbiter in the matter, Judge Grey.

Having noticed that Castle Harmondale has been restored by the party, both Catherine and Eldrich ask them to help in their dispute against the other by performing a feat of espionage that can gain them an advantage. The party find themselves either doing so within a period of a month, or letting their rival know of what they were asked to do. Eventually, a major fight between the two kingdoms erupts in the Tularean Forest over who gets to recover an important artifact - Gryphonheart's Trumpet. In managing to get it before the conflict ends (if the player arrives in time to learn of the battle), the party face the decision of handing the trumpet over to one of the leaders, granting that kingdom victory in the dispute over Harmondale, or passing it on to Grey, thus granting Harmondale independence from both kingdoms. If the player does not act within the timeframe, Erathia wins Harmondale by default. Regardless of the allocation of Harmondale, the greater conflict over the Contested Lands as a whole continues. A few months after the war begins, Judge Grey passes away from natural causes, leaving the party to find a suitable replacement.

Faced with deciding between either Judge Fairweather, a representative of the wizards of Bracada, or Judge Sleen, a representative of the necromancers of Deyja, the party's choice eventually decides the outcome of the war. If Judge Sleen is chosen, he does nothing to prevent tempers from flaring, the war worsens and the necromancers use the corpses of the fallen to make an undead army. This choice puts the player party on the Dark path. If Judge Fairweather is chosen, he helps the humans and elves come to a peaceful agreement by proposing they put the border halfway between what each monarch suggested, and thus ends their war over the Contested Lands. This choice puts the player party on the Light path. The characters' affiliation with Light or Dark cannot be changed after their choice of judge has been made. Following this, the party go to the city of their chosen path and meet with that city's leader (Gavin Magnus in Celeste or Archibald in The Pit), finding themselves undertaking a trial before meeting with the leader's four mysterious new advisors. Upon completing the trial, they soon find themselves working on a series of tasks for the advisors, who eventually reveal themselves as off-worlders and the Terrans that arrived on Enroth.

What was witnessed by the war parties of elves and goblins was not the full story - when the Terrans emerged from the sea, they soon fell into disagreement over their mission. Resurectra, Robert the Wise, Crag Hack and Sir Caneghem wanted to rebuild a forgotten Gate created by the Ancients, capable of allowing them to reach the two warring Guardians and perhaps even the enigmatic Ancients themselves. The others, Kastore, Tolberti, Dark Shade and Maximus, wanted to revive the Ancients' broken Heavenly Forge, capable of creating futuristic weaponry beyond compare, and use it to conquer Enroth. Eventually, the two groups separated into two parties - one "good" and one "evil" - and began exploring Antagarich, but not before each party set up a trap on the Lincoln to prevent the other side from gaining control over it. While the elven sorcerer Kastore led the "evil" party and eventually secured places for them in Deyja beside Archibald in order to continue to research a way to revive the Forge, the gnomish cleric Resurectra led the "good" party and formed an alliance with Gavin in order to complete the Gate, with both finding that they now need champions to get control of the seedship and recover an important device known as an Oscillation Overthruster to complete their instrument of victory.

Before the party can retrieve the device needed by Resurectra/Kastore, they first find themselves having do battle against the diabolical Kreegan (the devil-like alien race that featured in Might and Magic VI) and eliminate their monarch, Xenofex. Travelling to the Land of the Giants in the country of Eeofol, the party soon receive a message from Archibald upon arrival (regardless of the party's alignment), informing them that Kastore has deposed him and taken control of the Necromancers' Guild. Having become weary and guilt-ridden for his past crimes, he asks the players to enter the Kreegan's fortress of Colony Zod in the Land of the Giants and rescue his brother Roland, in the hopes that freeing her husband will lift a death sentence put on Archibald by Catherine. Rescuing Roland and defeating Xenofex, the party watch as the Ironfists reunite, before Archibald renounces his claim to Enroth's throne and departs in peace (Roland's liberation leads on into Heroes of Might and Magic III: Armageddon's Blade).

With the Kreegan dealt a blow, the party soon receive wetsuits from Resurectra/Kastore, and venture onto the submerged Lincoln, battling droids and finally retrieving the Osciliation Overthruster. The story ends depending on the party's chosen alignment. If Light, Resurectra's party uses the Overthruster to complete the Gate, thus being transported to a neighbouring space station where the party meets Corak (that is, a second C.O.R.A.K. module Guardian - the first Corak appeared throughout Might and Magic II to V), who reveals they can go anywhere in the Ancients' network of Gates from there. This is the canonical ending. If Dark, Kastore's party uses the Overthruster to revive the Heavenly Forge, thus producing an endless supply of futuristic weaponry capable of dominating the world. This ending was planned to be canonical and lead into the emergence of a high-tech Forge faction in Armageddon's Blade, but the Forge town was scrapped.

== Reception ==
Reception

Aggregate score
Aggregator	Score
GameRankings	76%

Review scores
Publication	Score
AllGame	4.5/5
CNET Gamecenter	7/10
Computer Games Strategy Plus	4/5
Computer Gaming World	4.5/5
Game Informer	7/10
GamePro	4/5
GameRevolution	B−
GameSpot	8.4/10
IGN	7.7/10
Next Generation	3/5
PC Accelerator	8/10
PC Gamer (US)	63%
RPGFan	90%

The game received favorable reviews according to the review aggregation website GameRankings. Aaron John Loeb of NextGen said, "If you have a burning hunger for a new RPG, Might and Magic VII offers a fine quick fix, but you don't get anything more than you'd expect."

The game was nominated for Computer Games Strategy Plus' and Computer Gaming World's 1999 "Role-Playing Game of the Year" awards, both of which ultimately went to Planescape: Torment.
