= Birthday (company) =

Japanese video game developer

- Company type: Private
- Industry: Video games
- Headquarters: Akasaka, Minato, Tokyo

Birthday Ltd. (バースデイ, Bāsudei) is a Japanese video game developer and character design firm based in Akasaka, Minato, Tokyo. The company developed the Kaijū Monogatari games and designs of the manga and anime series Fushigiboshi no Futagohime.

== List of works ==
- Kaijū Monogatari (Family Computer), 1988, published by Namco
- Juvei Quest (Family Computer), 1991, published by Namco
- Dream Master (Family Computer), 1992, published by Namco
- Daikaijū Monogatari (Super Famicom), 1994, published by Hudson Soft; mobile phone port released in 2006.
- Crystal Beans: From Dungeon Explorer (Super Famicom), 1995, port of Dungeon Explorer II, published by Hudson Soft
- Daikaijuu Monogatari II (Super Famicom), 1996, published by Hudson Soft
- Elemental Gimmick Gear (Dreamcast), 1999, published by Hudson Soft
- Fushigiboshi no Futagohime, concept, 2003.
- Chamamori, handheld toys, 2006, released by Ensky
- Cocoro no Cocoron, Nintendo DS, 2011, published by Namco Bandai Games
