= Daikaijū Monogatari =

1994 video game

- Developer: Birthday
- Publisher: Hudson Soft
- Composer: Haruyoshi Rokudo
- Series: Kaijū Monogatari
- Platform: SNES
- Release: JP: December 22, 1994
- Genre: Role-playing video game
- Mode: Single-player

Daikaijū Monogatari (Note: Japanese: 大貝獣物語; "Super Shell Monsters Story") is a Japanese role-playing video game developed by Birthday and published by Hudson Soft for Super Famicom, in December 1994 in Japan. It is a sequel to the Famicom game Kaijū Monogatari.

== Gameplay ==
In this game there are a series of natural disasters that are devastating the planet; causing the great Demon King Fattobajah (Fat Badger) to emerge from his elemental shell-induced slumber. A hero who carries a fire shell must save the world from a series of truly bad events. Up to ten playable characters can be used as allies in order to stop villains like Dr. Doan, Jalamar, Jodan, and Darkness Knight. The people who inhabit the land of Shelldorado are very smart despite looking like savage monsters.

There is a high level of random encounters in the game. Complex dungeon design can also be found in Daikaijū Monogatari that is typical of Japanese role-playing video games. While the main character and his allies factor into the storyline of the game, parts of the game seem to flow from the enemy's perspective more often.

When the player pauses the game, it normally leads to a series of eight options. Three more can be opened by virtue of a Pro Action Replay.

== Manga ==
- Daikaijū Monogatari
- Manga
- Written by: Kōdansha
- Published by: Kodansha
- Magazine: Comic BomBom
- Published: April 1995
- Volumes: 1

- A part of Comic BomBom, DaiKaijuu Monogatari 1 was released for Manga in April 1995 in Japan, is based on the Videogame of Same Name.

== Sequel ==
A sequel, Daikaijuu Monogatari II (Note: Japanese: 大貝獣物語II; "Super Shell Monsters Story II"), was released August 1996 in Japan by the same developer and publisher.
