= Might and Magic =

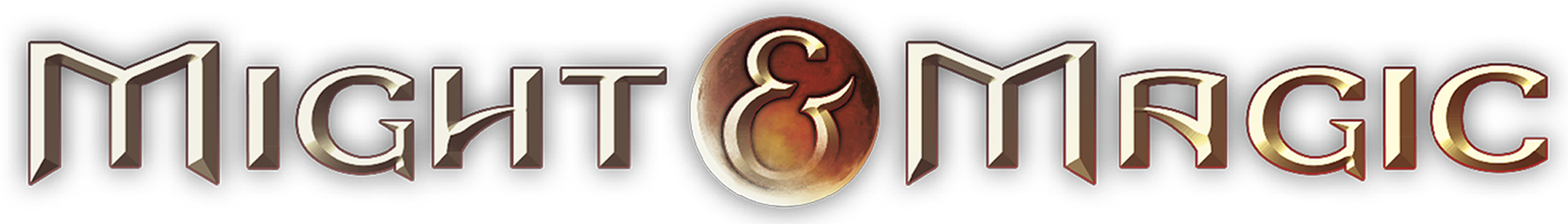
- The logo commonly used by Ubisoft
- Genre: Role-playing
- Developers: New World Computing (1984-2003); Arkane Studios (for Dark Messiah); Limbic Entertainment (for Might & Magic X)
- Publishers: New World Computing (1984-1996); The 3DO Company (1996-2003); Ubisoft (2003-)
- Creator: Jon Van Caneghem
- Platforms: Amiga, Apple II, Commodore 64, Mac, MS-DOS, MSX, NEC PC-9801, NES, PlayStation 2, Genesis, Super NES, TurboGrafx-16, Windows
- First release: Might and Magic Book One: The Secret of the Inner Sanctum; 1986
- Latest release: Might & Magic X: Legacy; 23 January 2014
- Spin-offs: Heroes of Might and Magic; List of spinoffs

Release timeline
1986	1: The Secret of the Inner Sanctum
1987
1988	2: Gates to Another World
1989
1990
1991	3: Isles of Terra
1992	4: Clouds of Xeen
1993	5: Darkside of Xeen
1994	World of Xeen
1995
1996
1997
1998	6: The Mandate of Heaven
1999	7: For Blood and Honor
2000	8: Day of the Destroyer
2001
2002	9: Writ of Fate
2003
2004
2005
2006
2007
2008
2009
2010
2011
2012
2013
2014	10: Legacy

Might and Magic is a series of role-playing video games in the science fantasy genre developed by New World Computing, which in 1996 became a subsidiary of The 3DO Company. The original Might and Magic series ended with the closure of the 3DO Company. The rights to the Might and Magic name were purchased for US$1.3 million by Ubisoft, which rebooted the franchise with a new series with no apparent connection to the previous continuity, starting with the games Heroes of Might and Magic V and Dark Messiah of Might and Magic.

== History ==
=== Main series ===
- Might and Magic Book One: The Secret of the Inner Sanctum (1986; Apple II, Mac, MS-DOS, Commodore 64, NES, MSX, PC Engine CD-ROM²)
- Might and Magic II: Gates to Another World (1988; Apple II, Amiga, MS-DOS, Commodore 64, Mac, Genesis, Super NES (Europe only), Super Famicom (Japan-only, different from the European Super NES version), MSX)
- Might and Magic III: Isles of Terra (1991; MS-DOS, Mac, Amiga, Super NES, Genesis (prototype), Sega CD, PC Engine Super CD-ROM²)
- Might and Magic IV: Clouds of Xeen (1992; MS-DOS, Mac)
- Might and Magic V: Darkside of Xeen (1993; MS-DOS, Mac)
  - Might and Magic: World of Xeen (1994; MS-DOS, Mac)
- Might and Magic VI: The Mandate of Heaven (1998; Windows)
- Might and Magic VII: For Blood and Honor (1999; Windows)
- Might and Magic VIII: Day of the Destroyer (2000; Windows, PlayStation 2 (Japan-only))
- Might and Magic IX: Writ of Fate (2002; Windows)
- Might & Magic X: Legacy (2014; Windows, OS X)

=== Spin-offs ===
There have been several spin-offs from the main series, including the long-running Heroes of Might and Magic series, Crusaders of Might and Magic, Warriors of Might and Magic, Shifters of Might and Magic, Legends of Might and Magic, Might and Magic: Heroes Kingdoms, and the fan-made Swords of Xeen.

In August 2003, Ubisoft acquired the rights to the Might and Magic franchise for US$1.3 million after 3DO filed for Chapter 11 bankruptcy. Ubisoft has since released multiple new projects using the Might and Magic brand, including a fifth installment of the Heroes series developed by Nival, an action-style game Dark Messiah of Might and Magic developed by Arkane Studios, a puzzle RPG Might & Magic: Clash of Heroes developed by Capybara Games, and the mobile strategy RPG titled Might & Magic: Elemental Guardians. Ubisoft has also released digital collectible games based on the series, such as Might & Magic: Duel of Champions in 2012 and Might and Magic: Fates in 2026.

== Gameplay ==
The majority of the gameplay takes place in medieval fantasy settings, while later sections of the games are often based on science fiction tropes, the transition often serving as a plot twist. The player controls a party of player characters, which can consist of members of various character classes. The game world is presented to the player in first person perspective. In the earlier games the interface is very similar to that of Bard's Tale, but from Might and Magic VI: The Mandate of Heaven onward, the interface features a three-dimensional environment. Combat is turn-based, though the later games allowed the player to choose to conduct combat in real time.

The game worlds in all of the Might and Magic games are quite large, and a player can expect each game to provide several dozen hours of gameplay. It is usually quite combat-intensive and often involves large groups of enemy creatures. Monsters and situations encountered throughout the series tend to be well-known fantasy staples such as giant rats, werewolf curses, dragon flights and zombie hordes, rather than original creations. Isles of Terra and the Xeen games featured a more distinct environment, blending fantasy and science fiction elements in a unique way.

The Might and Magic games have some replay value as the player can choose their party composition, develop different skills, choose sides, do quests in a different order, hunt for hidden secrets and easter eggs, and/or change difficulty level.

== Plot ==
Although most of the gameplay reflects a distinctly fantasy genre, the overarching plot of the first nine games has a science fiction background. The series is set in a fictional galaxy as part of an alternative universe, where planets are overseen by a powerful race of space travelers known as Ancients who seeded them with humans, elves, dwarves, goblins and others. In each of the games, a party of characters fights monsters and completes quests on one of these planets, until they eventually become involved in the affairs of the Ancients. As such, Might and Magic is an example of science fantasy.

The producer of the series was Jon Van Caneghem. Van Caneghem has stated in interview that the Might and Magic setting is inspired by his love for both science fiction and fantasy. He cites The Twilight Zone and the Star Trek episode For the World is Hollow and I Have Touched the Sky as having inspired Might and Magic lore.

The first five games in the series concern the renegade android Sheltem created by the Ancients to be the Guardian of the planet Terra, who becomes irrevocably corrupted, developing a penchant for throwing worlds into suns to sabotage the Ancients' Great Experiment, as his faulty programming views them as a threat to Terra. Sheltem establishes himself on a series of flat worlds known as nacelles (which are carried inside giant spaceships) and Corak, a second Guardian and creation of the Ancients, pursues him across the Void with the assistance of the player characters. Eventually both Corak and Sheltem are destroyed in a climactic battle on the nacelle world of Xeen.

The sixth, seventh and eighth games take place on Enroth, a single planet where a large continent also named Enroth is ruled by the Ironfist dynasty, and chronicle the events and aftermath of an invasion by the Kreegan (colloquially referred to as "devils"), the demon-like archenemies of the Ancients. It is also revealed that the destruction wrought by the Ancients' wars with the Kreegan is the reason why the worlds of Might and Magic exist as medieval fantasy settings despite once being seeded with futuristic technology – the worlds have been 'cut off' from the Ancients and descended into barbarism. The first through third games in the Heroes of Might and Magic series trace the fortunes of the Ironfists in more detail. None of the science fiction elements appear in the Heroes series besides the appearance of Kreegan characters in Heroes of Might and Magic III and IV. Might and Magic IX and Heroes IV take place on Axeoth, another planet which the survivors of Enroth were brought to through portals after it was destroyed in an event called the Reckoning.

The Ubisoft release Might & Magic X: Legacy departs from this continuity and is set in the world of Ashan, a separate setting established by Ubisoft in Heroes of Might and Magic V and subsequent Heroes games after New World Computing went out of business. Ashan is a high fantasy setting with no science fiction elements in its lore. The original setting remained abandoned until the 2025 game Heroes of Might and Magic: Olden Era, a prequel taking place on Enroth's continent Jadame, which was first featured in Might and Magic VIII: Day of the Destroyer.

== Reception ==
Might and Magic is considered one of the defining examples of early role-playing video games, along with The Bard's Tale, Ultima and Wizardry series. By March 1994, combined sales of the Might and Magic series totaled 1 million units. The number rose to 2.5 million sales by November 1996. and 4 million by March 1999.
