= Elemental Gimmick Gear =

1999 video game

- North American Dreamcast cover art
- Developer: Birthday
- Publishers: JP: Hudson Soft; NA: Vatical Entertainment
- Platform: Dreamcast
- Release: JP: May 27, 1999; NA: December 28, 1999
- Genre: Action role-playing
- Mode: Single-player

E.G.G.: Elemental Gimmick Gear (エレメンタルギミックギア -E.G.G.-, Erementaru Gimikku Gia -E.G.G.-) is an action role-playing game for the Sega Dreamcast console. Elemental Gimmick Gear uses hand-drawn art in an overhead view during exploration, then switches to 3D graphics during boss battles. It was developed by Birthday and published by Hudson Soft in Japan and Vatical Entertainment in the United States.

== Gameplay ==
The game follows through several ruins, that contain puzzles needing to be solved to move forward. Puzzles include switches and moving objects to open doors.

There are racing areas where the main character rolls into a ball (or egg shape) and race along rails to be the first to finish against the computer players.

== Plot ==
=== Beginning ===
In the world of Tokion, a dome-shaped ancient ruin was discovered inside a thick jungle. During excavation, an egg-shaped robot was found inside the ruins containing a sleeping man. No matter how hard scientists tried, he would not wake up. He was taken to a laboratory along with the machine to be further studied.

Upon analyzing the machine, they learned that it was over 5000 years old. They also could not find any form of power source. In time, the machine became known as "Elemental Gimmick Gear", or EGG for short. After extensive scientific analysis over a number of years, copies of the EGG were produced and used as personal robots.

100 years later, the ruin suddenly became active after a group of robots activated a button, which unleashed the power of a scary holographic face called Psycho Mother. These robots were later revealed to be members of a gang called The Pirates. This incident was later dubbed by the Tokionese as "The Breeding", as the power of Psycho Mother created a multitude of tentacles into the ground. They spread all across the land, destroying anything in their way and spawning a horde of killer monsters and robots in the process. With the tentacles came a thick layer of fog that surrounded the ruin, and people gave them the name Fogna.

At the same time, the Sleeper who was discovered a century prior finally awoke. He had not aged a day since his discovery and had no memory of his past or his own name. Selen, who was with him as he woke, set him free without notifying the other scientists in the lab. Naming him at default as Leon, she sent him to Fogna to begin searching for clues of what happened 5100 years ago, and to stop "The Breeding". Because Leon spends most of his time inside his EGG robot, many players have referred to the protagonist simply as "EGG" (said letter-by-letter).

=== Middle ===
While making his way through the first areas of Fogna, battling brain robots and a spider named Jointer (earning a Fire Stone), EGG returns to the village to hear that Selen was kidnapped by The Pirates. The Pirates are a vicious gang of robots led by Juji, the brutal dictator of Tokion that has long oppressed its people.

Upon talking to many of the townspeople (being asleep for 5100 years, EGG is unfamiliar with where he lives), he learns that Juji resides in Metal Heaven, a steampunk sky village that is rumoured to be "a paradise". The only way to get there is to succeed a series of life-threatening trials at Fog Tower, which connects Metal Heaven to Tokion. This tower serves as a buffer zone to prevent ordinary people from entering Metal Heaven, by which only Juji's bravest Pirates are able to pass the challenges. EGG uses the Fire Stone that he found from defeating Jointer to break the branches that block his way to Fog Tower, saving a woman stuck behind the branches. However, he then learns that he needs the Ice Stone as well to freeze the ponds that guard Fog Tower. He finds that stone after exploring Fogna's back entrance, where he encounters The Pirates face-to-face for the first time.

EGG uses the Ice Stone to access Fog tower, and completes all of the puzzles and challenges successfully. In the last challenge of Fog Tower, EGG was forced to fight Maximum, Juji's right-hand man. After EGG severely damaged Maximum (despite being alive still), Juji ordered two of his Pirates to throw him off the tower, as Juji felt that Maximum was "a weakling" upon his loss in the battle. Juji offers EGG to be his new right-hand man, and tells him to go to The Factory to meet up with him. Although EGG knows that his goal is to find Selen, and that Juji is an enemy, EGG agrees so he can get access to The Factory.

On the top floor of The Factory, EGG is able to find Selen, and he proceeds to find Juji in the next room. Although Juji treats him in a friendly manner, EGG shows him his true feelings, wanting payback for kidnapping Selen. Angered and betrayed, Juji gets inside of a large robots, and a boss fight ensures.

Upon destroying the robot and capturing Juji, EGG is awarded $1000 by the village mayor, a knight named Henry. Rots, the owner of the Eastokion Bar, is furious at Juji for an unexplained grudge that they have against each other. If EGG apologizes to Juji after Rots leaves in anger, he will begin to talk to EGG in a friendlier manner (despite being angry for what happened at The Factory) This decision made by the player will help to reveal a major plot point not found anywhere else in the game. Selen, back at the laboratory, awards EGG a propellor, which he can use to explore the flooded basement of Fogna. There, he needs to locate a green Plasma Stone to activate the elevator at Fogna's main entrance. The elevator takes EGG to Fogna's second floor, which has a long tentacle bridge at the second floors exit. This bridge takes him to a place called Trench Plant, an underwater base where EGG's (unknowingly) long lost friend, Omega, resides. This is around the point when EGG begins to remember who he was and his past.

EGG is only familiar to Omega from three prior, yet vague, flashbacks:

1st (before encountering The Pirates at Fogna)- Omega and EGG (as Dr. Beta) are in a rocky environment on a different planet (judging by the rocky textures), discussing organism samples that died off. They agree that they need to find more samples.

2nd (when entering Metal Heaven)- Omega and EGG are standing in front of a large war robot called Armordress. They discuss how they built it, and that they are afraid “for the time when it must be used”. They fear that the machine could “extinct humanity”.

3rd (at the tentacle bridge)- An earthquake occurs, and EGG becomes trapped underneath rocks. EGG was left there for 5,000 years until the excavation at the beginning of the game.

After having a lengthy discussion with Omega about their shared past, EGG is clarified about who he was. EGG was originally a scientist named Dr. Beta, who helped to construct a colony on the moon (Moon Colony). He was also an important researcher there. It was constructed during the time of World War 3, where the world became so ravaged and destroyed, that people lived at the colony until it was safe enough to return to Earth. The Armordress from the second flashback was what made World War 3 deadlier than it should have been. Fogna served as a “gateway” between Earth and Moon Colony. Omega states that Psycho Mother was originally programmed by a scientist named Alpha. Because he isn't mentioned anywhere else in the game, this character was most likely to be used for a future sequel, which never came to be. Omega orders EGG to go to Moon Colony, using the spaceship at Fog Tower to get there. However, while riding the ship, Psycho Mother learns of EGG's and Omega's actions. Omega is killed, and EGG dodges a tentacle launched at him.

At Moon Colony, all of the previous robots that were stationed there have gone haywire, due to the powers of Psycho Mother. There, EGG finds Moon Colony's main computer, Grand Mother. She orders EGG to find the Nova Stone, which can unlock the 16th basement of Fogna where Psycho Mother lives. She wants Psycho Mother to be defeated once and for all.

=== End ===
EGG finds the Nova Stone from Moon Colony, and returns to Tokion back on Earth. If EGG speaks with Juji at the village square before pursuing Psycho mother one-on-one, the player will have to make two very important choices. If the player selects EGG to say "I refuse (the money)" and "No, I feel sorry for you", EGG will learn things of Juji's past. During the conversation, Juji begins to speak in a sad and more human tone, compared to his personality as a brutal dictator. He even speaks pleasantly about a child who offered him bread. EGG can then go to meet Rots at the Easttokion Bar. After Rots asks EGG how Juji is doing, the player should select "He was thinking". Rots then leaves to meet Juji. However, once EGG goes back to the village square, Juji is nowhere to be found, and Rots explains to him their grudge (which was before unexplained):

Rots and Juji were best friends, and both worked as archaeologists. Juji had a 5-year-old son named Timmy, who would follow them on their excavations. When they went inside Fogna to find something (years before "The Breeding" took place), an earthquake happened, and Timmy became trapped under rocks. Rots and Juji quickly run out of Fogna to check to see if we were safe. Unfortunately, Juji struggled to get Timmy out of the rocks, so Rots went around town to get help. However, no one was willing to help, and Timmy died in front of Juji's eyes as a result.

Once Juji became Tokion's dictator, he would purge its people out of revenge of neglecting his son. To ensure the last step of the people's destruction, Juji ordered his Pirates to go to the bottom of Fogna, to find "Fogna's ultimate power" (he is referring to what was later discovered to be Psycho Mother). This was the exact moment that created "The Breeding", and all of the tentacles that destroyed Tokion.

Rots then told EGG that Juji stole a man's robot to stop "The Breeding" and Psycho Mother himself, trying to correct his past wrongdoing of unleashing her power.

Once EGG reaches the last room of Fogna's 16th basement, EGG confronts Psycho Mother. She is in an extremely mad state, appearing more vicious and scary than before. Before shutting down permanently, Psycho Mother uses the last of her energy to hatch the large snowglobe egg found in the center of Fogna. A large tube tunnel of tentacles is created from the snowglobe egg, connecting to Fogna's rooftop. There, Psycho Mother's son Noman is born.

Upon taking the elevator to the snowglobe egg room, Juji is seen at the brink of death. In his last breaths, Juji tells EGG how he unsuccessfully tried to stop Psycho Mother and her forces, and that EGG is the last hope in stopping "The Breeding" that he created long ago. Juji also offers EGG an Energy Tank before dying. Without it, EGG will have a very difficult time defeating Noman.

In his last words, Juji says, "Oh... He's calling me... Timmy, Daddy's here..."

Confronting Noman on Fogna's roof, Noman attaches himself to a large monster to make him unstoppable. EGG successfully defeats Noman and the monster, sending him through a black hole. Upon the defeat, EGG's friends congratulate him for stopping Psycho Mother and her forces (especially for Noman). However, EGG tells them that the only way "The Breeding" can officially be ended is for him to return to Moon Colony, shutting down Fogna permanently from there. As a result, EGG cannot return to Earth to visit his friends. EGG wishes them a final farewell before leaving and permanently shuts down Fogna with the Grand Mother computer. Fogna couldn't be shut down prior to EGG's first visit with Grand Mother, as Psycho Mother's power prevented Fogna from being able to self-destruct.

The game ends with an important life message:

"In the past, people made many mistakes. We still do. That may never change. However, we are also given the ability to correct mistakes and make fresh starts. As long as we do not forget that, we can rise again and again after any degree of destruction. We should be able to live along with our planet because we are also one of the lives that it has created and raised. In the future, our planet may be blessed with beautiful and perfect civilizations. Or it may be violated again. It is... up to us..."

With reading the plotline and all its complex details, the context is obvious. This is explaining Juji's past evil and his change-of-heart in helping EGG to stop Psycho Mother (who he sent his Pirates to unleash at the beginning of the game).

== Characters ==
Sleeper

"The Sleeper", Leon is the main character of the game. Leon is his default name, he is given it by Selen, the scientist watching over him. The player has the option of renaming him if desired. At the beginning of the game, Leon is frozen in a sleeping pod in the laboratory of Dr. Yam. Leon had been found 200 years earlier inside the original EGG, in which he had slept for 5000 years.

Dr. Yam

Dr. Yam is the head doctor at YAM Ruin Laboratory, which his father founded, where Leon awakes at the start of the game. He has spent his life studying the Sleeper. He takes care of Selen as if she were his daughter and gave her the assignment of studying the Sleeper.

Selen

Selen works in the laboratory, where she is responsible for caring for the Sleeper, whom she names Leon. She is the one who was with Leon as he woke and allows him to leave the lab. She always supports him.

Luckie

Luckie is an orphan who lost his parents during the Fogna activation. He lives in the city near YAM Ruin Laboratory with his younger sister. He is the leader of the local orphans from the Fogna disaster.

== Reception ==
Reception

Aggregate score
Aggregator	Score
GameRankings	71%

Review scores
Publication	Score
AllGame	3.5/5
CNET Gamecenter	7/10
Electronic Gaming Monthly	6.375/10 (Note: Four critics of Electronic Gaming Monthly gave the game each a score of 7.5/10, 5.5/10, 6.5/10, and 6/10.)
Famitsu	27/40
Game Informer	7/10
GameFan	(E.M.) 79% 72% (Note: In GameFan's viewpoint of the Japanese import, three critics gave it each a score of 74, 71, and 72.) (F.M.) 71%
GameRevolution	B
GameSpot	6.8/10
GameSpy	8/10
IGN	8/10
RPGamer	6.5/10

The game received above-average reviews according to the review aggregation website GameRankings. In Japan, Famitsu gave it a score of 27 out of 40. E. Coli of GamePro said, "E.G.G. has a surprisingly small world, and playing time depends mostly on how fast you can solve its mysteries. While it lacks depth, E.G.G. does offer some interesting and complex puzzles that will appeal mostly to gamers who aren't in a hurry." (Note: GamePro gave the game two 4/5 scores for graphics and fun factor, and two 3/5 scores for sound and control.)
