= Flame Dragon Plus: Marks of Wind =

1998 video game

Flame Dragon Plus
- Publisher(s): Dynasty International Information
- Platform(s): MS-DOS
- Release: 1998
- Genre(s): Tactical role-playing game
- Mode(s): Single player

Flame Dragon Plus: Marks of Wind (炎龍騎士團 外傳: 風之紋章) is a tactical role-playing computer game published by Dynasty International Information, a Taiwanese company. Release was initially planned for 1997, but it was released in early 1998. It is the third game in the series and is available only in Chinese.

While the second installment, Flame Dragon 2: Legend of Golden Castle (炎龍騎士團2: 黃金城之謎), gained some popularity in the English-speaking world, this title never gained the same interest due to less attractive graphics and less smooth interface. The mechanics of the game are almost identical to Flame Dragon 2.
