= Might and Magic IV: Clouds of Xeen =

1992 video game

- Developer(s): New World Computing
- Publisher(s): New World Computing
- Director(s): Jon Van Caneghem
- Programmer(s): Mark Caldwell; David Hathaway; Andrew Caldwell (PC-uncredited)
- Composer(s): Tim Tully (PC); Paul Lehrman (PC-uncredited); Gregory Alper (PC-uncredited); Takeshi Abo (PC98, FMT)
- Series: Might and Magic
- Platform(s): MS-DOS, FM Towns, NEC PC-9801
- Release: 1992
- Genre(s): Role-playing video game
- Mode(s): Single-player

Might and Magic IV: Clouds of Xeen (originally released as Might and Magic: Clouds of Xeen) is the fourth installment in the Might and Magic series by New World Computing.

== Plot ==
Might and Magic IV focuses on the events that occur after the adventurers of Might and Magic III set off to follow Sheltem after he escapes from Terra. Trouble is brewing in the land of Xeen. A mysterious villain by the name of Lord Xeen has imprisoned Crodo, overseer of Xeen, in a tower and is unleashing havoc across the land. A new band of adventurers must be formed to stop him and save both the Clouds of Xeen and the underground town of Shangri-La.

== Gameplay ==
The player's party encounters a monster.

Might and Magic IV uses a game engine based on that used by Might and Magic III: Isles of Terra, and the gameplay is almost identical. More emphasis is placed on cutscenes than in the earlier game, possibly due to the availability of larger hard drives.

This game and its successor, Might and Magic V: Darkside of Xeen can be combined to make one large game, World of Xeen. In-game, this is visualized as either game being a 'side' of a flat, rectangular planetoid. In the combined game, areas in both games become available that are impossible to access in the standalone games. Both game's endings can be achieved, after either of which gameplay continues. A third ending is available only in the combined games.

The game was initially available on floppy disc but was also released on CD. Might and Magic IV and V were some of the first Western games to come out on CD, although Japanese studios had been using the CD-ROM medium since 1988. They were also the first games to come out where every character's dialogs are recorded on the CDs; the software plays the CD back at specific tracks, seeking to the proper second offset within the track.

Clouds of Xeen introduced several new features into the series. This included a notes section which kept track of important information such as quests, clues, passwords, and the coordinates of locations of note. It also had a difficulty setting where you could select Adventurer or Warrior, with the latter having more challenging enemies in combat, but no other gameplay differences. It also had a separate inventory for quest items which kept the player from accidentally discarding or selling critical items.

== Reception ==
Computer Gaming World' Scorpia stated in 1993 that "There isn't much plot to Clouds of Xeen ... The world is rather empty of everyday people", similar to previous games in the series. She criticized the ending for being too binary: "if you have the right item, Xeen is toast; if you don't have it, your party is toast ... makes the confrontation almost pointless". Scorpia nonetheless concluded that both "hard-core Might & Magic fans" and some others might enjoy the game. She later that year advised players to install and play Clouds and Might & Magic V: Darkside of Xeen together for "the most enjoyment". The game was reviewed in 1993 in Dragon #191 by Hartley, Patricia, and Kirk Lesser in "The Role of Computers" column. The reviewers gave the game 5 out of 5 stars. Might and Magic: World of Xeen (comprising Clouds of Xeen and Dark Side of Xeen) was reviewed in 1994 in Dragon #201 by Sandy Petersen in the "Eye of the Monitor" column. Petersen gave the compilation 3 out of 5 stars.

Barry Brenesal of PC Magazine wrote that "some fans may ... find the game too easy, with few puzzles to bedevil the novice adventurer." However, he considered the game "well crafted and visually entertaining", and believed that it should be "enjoyed as a free ride through the imaginations of New World Computing's artists."

== See also ==
- World of Xeen
