= Might and Magic Book One: The Secret of the Inner Sanctum =

1986 video game

Might and Magic Book One: Secret Of The Inner Sanctum
- Developer: New World Computing
- Publishers: New World Computing: NA: New World Computing (computers); JP: StarCraft (computers); JP: Gakken (NES); NA: Sammy USA (NES)
- Designers: Jon Van Caneghem; Michaela Van Caneghem
- Artists: Joseph Arthur Ferreira; Vincent DeQuattro; Jon Van Caneghem; Michaela Van Caneghem
- Series: Might and Magic
- Platforms: Apple II, MS-DOS, Commodore 64, FM-7, PC-88, PC-98, X1, X68000, MSX, Mac, NES, PC Engine
- Release: 1986: Apple II; NA: 1986 Computer ports 1987-1988 NES; JP: July 31, 1990; NA: August 1992 PC Engine; JP: January 24, 1992
- Genre: Role-playing
- Mode: Single-player

Might and Magic Book One: Secret of the Inner Sanctum (also known as simply Might and Magic) is an early role-playing video game, first in the popular and influential Might and Magic franchise. It was released in 1986 as New World Computing's debut, ported to numerous platforms and re-released continuously through the early 1990s.

== Plot and setting ==
The game is set on the world of Varn, which features expansive outdoor terrain, castles, caves, underground cities and an Astral Plane.

The game centers on six adventurers who are trying to discover the secret of the Inner Sanctum: a kind of "holy grail" quest. While trying to discover the Inner Sanctum, the heroes discover information about a mysterious character named Corak and his hunt for the missing villain Sheltem. They end up unmasking Sheltem, who had been masquerading as the King, and defeating his evil machinations. At the end of the game they go through the "Gates to Another World" and travel to Cron, the setting of Might and Magic II, not knowing that Sheltem has also escaped to that world.

Although it appears to take place in a straightforward medieval fantasy setting of knights in armor, mythical monsters and magicians, a number of science fiction elements are revealed later in the game, down to the actual meaning of VARN (Vehicular Astropod Research Nacelle). This was a relatively common trait of early CRPGs, as also seen in the oldest Ultima and Wizardry titles. For example, the Sheltem plot is first introduced when the adventurers visit the site of a crashed space ship and are told by aliens that their prisoner is at large in the world.

== Gameplay ==
=== Characters ===
The characters in Might and Magic and its successors are defined by a number of rules, conforming loosely to the fantasy role-playing archetypes.

Characters have "statistics" (analogous to Dungeons and Dragons Ability scores) of Might, Endurance, Speed, Accuracy, Personality, Intelligence and Luck.

There are six character classes:

- Knight characters are based on the Dungeons and Dragons Fighter class.
- Cleric characters are like D&D Clerics.
- Robbers are like the old D&D Thief class.
- Sorcerers (called Wizards in the NES version) are like the old Magic-Users.
- Paladins are fighter type characters who gain access to Clerical magic at higher experience levels. Unlike their D&D equivalent, there is no restriction on their alignment.
- Archers are more limited fighter characters, who can use ranged weapons even when on the front line of combat, and gain access to Sorcerer spells at higher levels.

The player assigns each character a race at creation time: Human, Elf, Half-orc, Gnome or Dwarf. This affects the character's starting statistics, and their resistance to various forms of attack.

Alignment is also chosen for all characters, but because the party acts collectively all of the time, the implications of this are minimal. Alignment plays some part in the game, in particular to determine the reward for one of the game's quests.

Characters can also be male or female. Like alignment, gender serves minimal purpose in the game, save for a few situations (notably, the city of Portsmith, in which all males, and only males, are injured when stepping through certain areas of the city). A character's gender can be changed back and forth via certain actions within the game world.

=== Magic ===
There are two types of magic spells in Might and Magic: Sorcerer spells and Clerical spells. Sorcerer spells are available to Sorcerer and Archer characters; Clerical spells are available to Cleric and Paladin characters. Daily spellcasting ability is limited by a character's spell points. For users of Sorcerer spells, the number of spell points available depends on that character's Intelligence statistic. For Clerical spellcasters, the number of spell points depends on the character's Personality statistic.

Sorcerer spells tend to be of an offensive nature, inflicting damage on enemy creatures.

Clerical spells are usually more defensive, focusing on healing, defense and removal of poison and other undesirable effects.

=== Exploration ===
Exploring the world (IBM PC)

The world is presented using a first person perspective. It is divided into a maze-like grid and the player's movement options are to move forward or backward, or turn ninety degrees left or right. The walls represent mountain ridges, cave stone, rows of trees or whatever obstruction might be expected in the terrain being explored. Exploration, like combat, is turn-based in Might and Magic, and game time does not pass while the player is deciding what to do.

If the party moves to a place where there are hostile creatures, or if a random encounter occurs, the game switches to a combat mode.

=== Combat ===
When hostile creatures are encountered, the player is usually given the option to run away, attempt to surrender to the creatures, try to bribe them, or to attack. If the player elects to attack, or if their combat evasion attempt fails, the game enters combat mode.

On most platforms, the combat interface is presented in a text-only format. Turn-based combat is conducted, with each combatant acting in order of their speed statistic. Each round a random speed bonus is applied to either the player's party or the enemy creatures. On each player-character's turn, the player selects an action from a list of options, including attacking a creature, casting a spell or attempting to run away.

Combat ends when all combatants from one side or the other have either been rendered unconscious or dead (usually by having their hit points reduced to zero), or fled from combat. The player can also lose at combat by allowing all members of the party to succumb to sleep or paralysis effects.

== Development ==
The original Apple II version of the game was written almost single-handedly by Jon Van Caneghem over three years. Van Caneghem had difficulty finding a publisher to distribute Might and Magic, so he self-published as New World Computing, handling the distribution himself from his own apartment until he was able to broker a distribution deal with Activision.

Due to its popularity the game was ported to a number of other platforms that were popular at the time, and nine sequels were released over the next fifteen years.

A port of Might and Magic was released for Nintendo Entertainment System in 1992. While the basic gameplay was similar to ports released on earlier platforms, the graphics and general polish on the game reflected the later release date and greater capability of the Nintendo platform. The music for this version was composed by Masaharu Iwata.

The game was remade again for release in Japan on the PC Engine platform. This version of the game was released on CD-ROM² rather than cartridge and was able to feature digitized voices for dialogue as a result of the increased storage capacity offered by the CD medium.

The game was later included in Might and Magic VI: The Mandate of Heaven Limited Edition and Special Edition.

== Reception ==
Might and Magic sold over 100,000 copies by 1989.

In 1987, Compute! magazine praised Might and Magic for its wealth of content, non-linear play and aspects of its graphics, though it notes that the game graphics lack animation, and that there is limited graphical representation of enemy combatants. Computer Gaming World described it as "a big adventure game with much to like and much to explore", with a depth that "everyone who plays it will appreciate". The magazine's Scorpia praised the game's extensiveness, but noted that early versions of the game only equipped new party members with clubs, making the beginning of the game very difficult. In 1988 Might and Magic joined the magazine's Hall of Fame for games highly rated over time by readers. In 1993 the magazine stated that despite the starting difficulty "it's well worth the effort". In 1996, the magazine named Might and Magic the 23rd best game ever. The editors wrote, "A 3D dungeon view combined with the biggest world map to date were just two of the major features of this advanced level CRPG."

The Apple II version of the game was reviewed in 1987 in Dragon #122 by Patricia Lesser in "The Role of Computers" column. Lesser stated that "This adventure is awesome in its scope, completely fascinating, graphically pleasing, and one of the top five games ever produced for a computer." In a subsequent column, the reviewers gave the game 5 out of 5 stars. Hartley, Patricia, and Kirk Lesser reviewed the IBM version of the game in 1988 in Dragon #132, also giving it 5 out of 5 stars. The Lessers reviewed the MacIntosh version of the game in Dragon #140, giving the Macintosh II version 4½ stars, and the Macintosh Plus version 3½ stars.

Modern commentators acknowledge MM1 for the immense scope of its world, for its freedom of exploration and for pioneering aspects such as incorporating player characters' race, gender and alignment into the gameplay.
