= Crusaders of Might and Magic =

1999 video game

- North American cover art
- Developer: The 3DO Company
- Publisher: The 3DO Company
- Directors: Joshua Cloud (Windows); Dave Georgeson (PlayStation)
- Producers: Jennifer Hubbart (Windows); David Downing (PlayStation)
- Designers: Erik Robson (Windows); Bruce Adams (PlayStation); Eric Brown (PlayStation)
- Programmers: Sean Craig (Windows); Jean-Paul Cossigny (PlayStation); Hugh David (PlayStation); Jason Hoerner (PlayStation); Lon Meinecke (PlayStation); Scott Osborn (PlayStation); Wendy White (PlayStation)
- Artists: Michael Wallin (Windows); Yu-Fen S. Croddy (PlayStation); Paul Forest (PlayStation)
- Composers: Robert King (Windows); Womb Music (PlayStation)
- Series: Might and Magic
- Platforms: Windows, PlayStation
- Release: Windows: NA: December 14, 1999; PlayStation: NA: February 28, 2000; EU: 2000
- Genre: Action role-playing
- Mode: Single player

Crusaders of Might and Magic is a 1999 third-person action/RPG video game developed and published by 3DO's Austin, Texas studio (PlayStation) and Redwood Shores studio (PC). Different versions of the game were released for both Microsoft Windows and the PlayStation.

== Development ==
The Windows version of the game was intended for simultaneous release with the PlayStation version, targeting the 1999 Christmas season. However, while the PlayStation team had been working on their version for several years, the Windows team was given only 7 months to generate a full-length game's worth of assets and retrofit an existing first-person shooter engine to handle third-person combat. The PC version shipped for Christmas, while the Playstation version followed in February 2000. Both received lukewarm reviews.

== Plot ==
The game takes place in the fictional Might and Magic universe, upon the world of Ardon. The prologue depicts the burning of a small village in the Fairfield Lowlands by the Legion of the Fallen, an undead army under the command of Necros, a paragon among Necromancers who sold his soul to the dark gods in exchange for unparalleled sorcerous aptitude.

A young boy named Drake, the only survivor of the massacre, escapes into the forests of Duskwood and roams Ardon for years, seeking revenge against the undead. During an attack on his camp by Ogres, Drake is saved by the blind hermit Nomandi, who becomes Drake's mentor over the next few years.

The first playable portion of the PlayStation version takes place in Stronghold following Drake's capture by Shamblers, the lowliest of the undead. Drake escapes Stronghold with the aid of Celestia, Lady Archon of Citadel, and is enlisted into the ranks of the valiant crusaders under her rule.

Traveling to Corantha, city of the Dwarves, Drake enters an agreement with Prince Dain Stonefist against the Ironpick rebels who attack the city from within, exposing Dain's brother, Tor, as an agent for the Legion. Travelling to Duskwood, Drake retrieves the Coranthan Scepter of Regency from a band of Ogres with the aid of the insectoid Dashers and their leader, Tamris.

Returning to Corantha, Drake discovers that Earth Elementals have awakened while both Dain and Tor have gone missing, with the Ironpicks continuing to battle the Stonefists. Drake navigates the deep mines and defeats the revenant of King Aiden, Dain's recently slain father raised through necromancy, thereby saving the Prince and gaining Corantha's favour against the undead.

Returning to Citadel, Drake is then tasked with retrieving a talisman named the Star of Erathia from the northern Glaciers to aid in the war effort. After doing so, he returns to Duskwood to combat the Legion in the grub-infested tunnels below the forest floor, successfully destroying Necros' supply lines. With this victory in hand, he travels back to Stronghold, to aid Celestia's crusaders and the Dwarves in the final siege against the Legion's bastion.

Upon his arrival, Drake encounters Celestia fleeing the battlefield, and finds the leader of the crusaders, Captain Ursan, missing. Nevertheless, while the crusaders fight on the front lines, he penetrates the walls of Stronghold, battling the Legion's armies. Drake finally comes face-to-face with Necros in Stronghold's depths, but the wily Necromancer departs through a portal, leaving the crusader to combat his lieutenants. Drake claims victory, and follows the Necromancer through the portal.

Finding himself in Necros' floating battleship, Drake discovers Necros' forces docked at a massacred, Legion-occupied Citadel. Drake fights his way to Celestia's throne room, finding no sign of the Lady Archon. He then comes upon a hidden chamber filled with arcane, futuristic mechanisms, discovering an elevator leading to an outer-world location. There, he finds Necros standing before an enormous interdimensional portal - the Kreegan Gate.

Necros claims that Celestia sought the power of the Kreegans just as much as he did, taunting Drake into doing battle. Instead of attacking the invincible Necromancer, Drake destroys the Gate itself, causing a rift in space. Drake targeted the outer pillars with Exploding Gems right where the bolts of electricity travel to the Kreegan Gate. Necros is drawn through the Gate's portal, screaming promises of revenge against Drake. Drake, triumphant, returns to Citadel, finding the crusaders victorious against the Legion. With Celestia still in hiding from Necros and her newly enlightened armies, Drake becomes the Lord Archon of Citadel, and the new leader of the crusaders.

Numerous aspects of the storyline differ in the Windows version. Before reaching the Citadel, Drake must pass through the small village of Cador-Sûl, which is not present in the PlayStation version. Also, Prince Dain must be rescued from the Ironpicks before he can be spoken to, and Tor is not present. Two dungeon-like locations, the Catacombs and the fallen Starship, are accessible only in the Windows version. Ursan plays a larger role, Celestia does not flee Citadel and the final battle takes place on Necros' Battleship, with no mention of the Kreegan Gate.

== Gameplay ==
In both the Windows and PlayStation versions, Drake starts with no weapons, but the player can quickly find a melee weapon and shield. The game is partially combat-oriented, though features an inventory system with a range of equipment to locate and choose from. While the Windows version features a simple experience system which involves defeating enemies to level up, the PlayStation version expands upon this, allowing the player to improve their skill with individual weapons, spells and projectiles through battle.

Drake himself also gains in experience as he defeats enemies. With each new experience level, he is restored to full health and gains an increase in maximum hit points, mana and offensive ability. The game has three difficulty levels to choose from. Selecting an increased difficulty rating primarily affects Drake's ability to dodge and attack enemies.

Over the course of the game, the player can discover spell books which allow Drake to cast new spells (or, in the Windows version, upgrade spells they already possess). Both versions employ spells which cost mana to be cast. Spells also have a brief casting time, during which Drake is vulnerable to attack.

While similar locations are present in each, both versions of the game feature vastly different level design. One such common location is the Citadel, a floating city depicted as a standard medieval castle in the Windows version, with conches and shell-like structures prominent in the PlayStation's variation. Other similar areas include Duskwood, populated by the tribe-like Dashers, Corantha, the underground realm of the Dwarves, Stronghold, the bastion of the Legion of the Fallen, and the Glaciers in southern Ardon, populated by hostile snow-dwelling creatures.

The PlayStation version features the ability to "empower" weapons and armor by purchasing elemental-, essence- and aether- based talismans and runes, attuning each to different properties - respectively Fire, Earth, Water, Air; Spirit, Mind, Body; and Light and Dark. Every individual character in the game is based upon one of these nine properties, and use of separate runes and talismans allows the player to defeat certain foes more easily.

In addition, the PlayStation version contains a New Game Plus feature. Completing the game on any of the three difficulty levels unlocks a "Special" difficulty level, which grants the player all weapons, spells, talismans, runes and infinite items at the outset.

== Reception ==
Reception

Aggregate score
Aggregator	Score	
Aggregator	PC	PS
GameRankings	53%	60%

Review scores
Publication	Score	
Publication	PC	PS
AllGame	3/5	3/5
CNET Gamecenter	6/10	N/A
Computer Games Strategy Plus	3.5/5	N/A
Computer Gaming World	2/5	N/A
Electronic Gaming Monthly	N/A	3.125/10 (Note: In Electronic Gaming Monthly's review of the PlayStation version, two critics gave it each a score of 3/10, one gave it 2.5/10, and another gave it 4/10.)
Game Informer	N/A	7.25/10
GameSpot	5.5/10	6.7/10
GameSpy	67%	N/A
IGN	4/10	3/10
Next Generation	2/5	N/A
Official U.S. PlayStation Magazine	N/A	3/5
PC Accelerator	3/10	N/A
PC Gamer (UK)	59%	N/A

The game received a good amount of hype, especially as a result of being considered true 3D and its supposedly revolutionary ideas. However, it received mixed reviews on both platforms according to the review aggregation website GameRankings. Daniel Erickson of NextGen said of the PC version, "All things Might and Magic no longer shine. Keep clear of this failed experiment."

In one review, Jake the Snake of GamePro said of the PlayStation version, "If you like RPGs, third-person action, and puzzle solving, you'll probably enjoy Crusaders. The action will seem slow, however, for more casual 3D adventurers." (Note: GamePro gave the PlayStation version two 3.5/5 scores for graphics and control, and two 4/5 scores for sound and fun factor in one review.) However, The Freshman said of the same console version in another review, "There are better games like this on the PSX already, notably Eidos' Soul Reaver and the Tomb Raider series. If you really need Might & Magic, play it on a friend's PC. This translation has neither the strength nor the soul to battle for the best on PlayStation." (Note: GamePro gave the PlayStation version two 3.5/5 scores for graphics and overall fun factor, and two 3/5 scores for sound and control in another review.)
