= Might and Magic II: Gates to Another World =

1988 video game

- Developer: New World Computing
- Publisher: New World Computing
- Designers: Jon Van Caneghem; Michaela Van Caneghem
- Programmers: Jon Van Caneghem; Stephen L. Cox; Mark Caldwell
- Artists: Avril Harrison; Jeff Griffeath; Vincent DeQuattro
- Composer: Raoul Kraushaar
- Series: Might and Magic
- Platforms: Apple II, PC-88, PC-98, FM-7, Sharp X1, X68000, MS-DOS, Commodore 64, MSX, Amiga, Mac, Mega Drive/Genesis, Super NES
- Release: 1988: 1988 (Apple II); 1988-1990 (computer ports); 1991 (Mega Drive/Genesis); 1993 (SNES)
- Genre: Role-playing video game
- Mode: Single-player

Might and Magic II: Gates to Another World (also known as Might and Magic Book Two: Gates to Another World) is a role-playing video game developed and published by New World Computing in 1988. It is the sequel to Might and Magic Book One: The Secret of the Inner Sanctum.

== Gameplay ==
Map of Cron, drawn by Jim Krogel

After the events of Might and Magic Book One: The Secret of the Inner Sanctum, the adventurers who helped Corak defeat Sheltem on Varn take the "Gates to Another World" located in Varn to the land of CRON (Central Research Observational Nacelle). The land of Cron is facing many problems brought on by the encroachment of Sheltem and the adventurers must travel throughout Cron, into the four elemental planes and even through time to help Corak stop Sheltem from flinging Cron into its sun.

While in many ways Might and Magic II is an updated version of the original, the improved graphics help greatly with navigation, and the interface added several functions that facilitated gameplay, such as a "delay" selector which allowed for faster or slower response times, and a spinning cursor when input was required - all features lacking in Might and Magic Book One.

As with Might and Magic Book One, the player used up to six player-generated characters at a time, and a total of twenty-six characters could be created, who thereafter stayed at the various inns across Cron. To continue game continuity it was possible to "import" the characters developed from the first game. Additionally, Might and Magic II became the first game in the series to utilize "hirelings", predefined characters which could extend the party to eight active characters. Hirelings were controlled like regular characters but required payment each day; pay increased with level.

Other new features include two new character classes, an increased number of spells, the introduction of class "upgrade" quests and more than twice the number of mini-quests. Also added was "secondary skills" such as mountaineering (necessary for travelling mountainous regions) and linguist (raising the character's intelligence, and necessary for reading certain messages). Each character could have up to two secondary skills. The game introduced an automap feature to the series, activated by training a character in the cartographer skill.

Perhaps the most peculiar development in this game was the numeric scope. Character levels could reach 255 ((2^{8})-1), at which point they could train without limit, provided they had enough gold. Hit points could be extended as high as 65535 ((2^{16})-1) and magic points up to 9999. To nearly any item, a "+" bonus could be added via an enchantment. This "+" bonus increased the weapon's damage or attribute bonus, as in Dungeons & Dragons, but unlike D&D the ceiling on "+" bonuses was 63. Might and Magic II pitted the player's party against any one of 255 monsters varying from 1 hit point to 64000. Battles could consist of up to 255 opponents.

While Might and Magic II remained a battle-focused game, there were many puzzles to be solved, and curiosities to be discovered. There is a cave with a sex-change device, for instance, and scattered about the land are seemingly nonsensical colored messages that eventually combines into useful hints (as in the first game). Most of the quests in the game require the player to solve puzzles rather than look for the next hack and slash battle. Time travel was added, though its ramifications were practically nil with the exception of being necessary to fight the final boss. The taverns feature humorous culinary selections and there are various absurdities strewn about, such as the ability to get drunk off of too much ale, which would result in reduced abilities of the character. Stats can be increased at the annual circus, which requires a collection of cupie dolls to play the games.

A character can belong to one of eight classes. Each class has at least one prime statistic which a character must equal or exceed to be a member of that class. All classes other than Knights or Barbarians also have special skills or abilities. All six classes featured in Might and Magic Book One are available in the sequel: Knight (must defeat the Dread Knight), Paladin (must slay the Frost Dragon), Archer (must stop Baron Wilfrey), Cleric (have to reunite the soul of Corak with his body), Sorcerer (must release both the good and the evil wizards from the Isle of the Ancients), and Robber. In addition two new classes are introduced:

- Ninja: Ninja are specialized Robbers, having thieving abilities to a lesser degree, plus the ability to assassinate their opponents. Ninjas must assassinate the wicked enchantress Dawn.
- Barbarian: Barbarians have high hit points and reasonable fighting abilities, though a limited selection of weapons and armour. Barbarians must kill the barbarian chieftain Brutal Bruno.

There are many aspects of this game which were not standard for RPGs of the time. Characters aging during gameplay, and when reaching old age (~75) they would die randomly due to natural causes. The spell that reverses this process usually fails, resulting in increasing the character's age as opposed to decreasing it. However, paying a visit to a health spa on a resort isle can reduce the character's age. The ability to travel into the past, specifically nine different centuries, although only two of them seemed relevant to the main story and two to a sidequest. Class-specific quests and class-restricted areas, forcing the player to split up the party, or use different combinations of characters. In a departure from the high fantasy flavour typical for RPGs, the last dungeon requires the player characters to board a spaceship and solve an encrypted message with a time limit in order to escape the planet.

== Release ==
Might and Magic II was ported to 14 different systems: five Western home computers, six Japanese home computers, and three gaming consoles.

In particular, two ports for the Super Nintendo were developed by two separate teams: one exclusive for the Japanese SNES and a different one exclusive for the European SNES.

== Reception ==
Dragon reviewers gave the game 4 out of 5 stars, and 5 out of 5 stars for the Sega Genesis version. Computer Gaming World gave the game a mixed review, noting several bugs in the 1.0 version. The reviewer, Scorpia, also lamented the simple plotline, saying, "Might & Magic II seems to have swerved off the path in the boring "monster mash/Monty Haul" direction, where ever-more-powerful characters with ever-more-powerful weapons fight ever-more-powerful monsters until it all escalates into the realm of the ludicrous." Van Caneghem later got revenge on Scorpia by naming a monster after her in the sequel. In 1991 the magazine also reviewed the Sega Genesis version, stating that while easy to play and with excellent graphics, the overemphasis on combat made the game "workmanlike" and "airless". In 1993 Scorpia stated that Might & Magic II was "not as good as the previous game on many counts (...) only for the devoted hack and slash crowd".

In 1991, PC Format placed Might and Magic II on its list of the 50 best computer games of all time.
