= Index of DOS games (K) =

This is an index of DOS games.

This list has been split into multiple pages. Please use the Table of Contents to browse it.

Title	Released	Developer(s)	Publisher(s)
Kampfgruppe	1985	Strategic Simulations	Strategic Simulations
Karateka	1984	Jordan Mechner	Broderbund
Karnov	1989	Quicksilver Software	Data East
Kasparov's Gambit	1993	Heuristic Software	Electronic Arts
Keef the Thief	1989	Naughty Dog	Electronic Arts
Keen Dreams	1991	id Software	Softdisk
Ken's Labyrinth	1993	Ken Silverman	Epic MegaGames
Keys to Maramon, The	1990	Knight Tech	Mindcraft
KGB	1992	Cryo Interactive	Virgin Entertainment
Kick Off 2	1990	Dino Dini	Anco Software
Kick Off 3	1994	Dino Dini	Anco
Kick Off 96	1996	Dino Dini	Anco
Kick Off 97	1997	Dino Dini	Anco
Kick Off 98	1998	Dino Dini	Anco
Kiloblaster	1992	Epic MegaGames	Epic MegaGames
Kingdom of Kroz	1987	Scott Miller	Apogee Software
Kingdom O' Magic	1996	SCi	SCi
Kingdom: The Far Reaches	1997	ReadySoft	Interplay
Kingmaker	1993	U.S. Gold	TM Games
King of Chicago, The	1987	Doug Sharp, Cinemaware, Master Designer Software	Cinemaware, Mindscape
King's Bounty	1990	New World Computing	New World Computing
Kings of the Beach	1988	Electronic Arts	Electronic Arts
King's Quest: Quest for the Crown	1984	Sierra On-Line	Sierra On-Line
King's Quest II: Romancing the Throne	1985	Sierra On-Line	Sierra On-Line
King's Quest III: To Heir Is Human	1986	Sierra On-Line	Sierra On-Line
King's Quest IV: The Perils of Rosella	1988	Sierra Entertainment	Sierra Entertainment
King's Quest V: Absence Makes the Heart Go Yonder!	1990	Sierra Entertainment	Sierra Entertainment
King's Quest VI: Heir Today, Gone Tomorrow	1992	Sierra Entertainment	Sierra Entertainment
King's Quest VII: The Princeless Bride	1994	Sierra Entertainment	Sierra Entertainment
KKND	1997	Beam Software	Beam Software
Klax	1990	Tengen	Tengen
Klondike Solitaire	1984	Mouse Systems Corporation	Mouse Systems Corporation
Knight Games	1988	English Software	Mastertronic
Knightmare	1987	MD Software	Activision
Knight Orc	1987	Level 9	Rainbird Software
Knights of Legend	1989	Todd Porter	Origin Systems
Knights of the Desert	1983	Strategic Simulations	Strategic Simulations
Knights of the Sky	1990	MicroProse	MicroProse
Knights of Xentar	1991	ELF Corporation	Megatech Software
Kobyashi Naru	1987	Mastertronic	Mastertronic
Kristal, The	1989	Fissionchip Software	Addictive Games, Cinemaware
Krusty's Fun House	1993	Fox Williams, Audiogenic	Virgin Games, Acclaim Entertainment
Krypton Egg	1989	Kral Bros.	Hitsoft
KULT: The Temple of Flying Saucers	1989	Exxos, ERE informatique	Infogrames, Data East
Kwik Snax	1990	Oliver twins	Codemasters
