= Kevin Keegan's Player Manager =

1993 video game

- Developer: Anco Software
- Publisher: Imagineer
- Programmer: Steve Screech
- Composer: Koji Hayashi
- Platform: Super Nintendo Entertainment System
- Release: EU: 1993
- Genre: Sports
- Modes: Single-player, multiplayer

Kevin Keegan's Player Manager (German title: K. H. Rummenigge's Player Manager) is a football (soccer) video game developed by British studio Anco Software and released for the Super Nintendo Entertainment System, featuring football manager Kevin Keegan.

== Gameplay ==
The player takes a football team and manages them to win games and eventually the championship. The player does not control each individual team member directly. Instead, the player designs plays and acquires players from other teams in order to make the perfect team.

Both teams are out on the soccer field and are ready to play a game.

Kevin Keegan's Player Manager gave the player the option of having direct control of the team on the pitch like a regular football sim (but only if the player's personal character was still within playing age and currently representing the team on the pitch), as well as doing all the managerial side of the gameplay as in regular football management sims. The game was based on the Player Manager game developed by Dino Dini for the Amiga and Atari ST, but was not endorsed by the original creator. Players take the role of the player-coach, and begin the game as a 28-year-old. At the age of 35 years (corresponding to the end of the 2000 season), the player character automatically declares his retirement. Controlling the players during a match from that point becomes impossible from that point onwards. After a few more seasons, however the player could sign a nephew or other family member and again become able to control the players on the pitch again. There were only forty-eight teams in a three division structure, and the top tier was titled 'Division 1' as this was before the days of the Premier League. It also featured the FA Cup (titled the Misawa Cup), and Football League Cup (titled Premier Cup) competitions.

Misawa Cup features all 48 teams that are in the game. The 16 Division 1 clubs get byes to the last 32, while the Division 2 & 3 teams battle out for the remaining 16 spaces. This is a knockout competition which also features replays and a Wembley Final Premier Cup. This only features all 32 teams in Division 1 & 2. It's a straight knockout but it's over 2 legs (Apart from the final) and Away goals always count double. Again this features a Wembley final.

The game has features like training, scouting and newspaper reports; on-field positions are associated with unique colours.

== Reception ==
Power Unlimited gave the game a rating of 80% in their January 1994 issue. Consoles Plus rated the game with a score of 71% back in May 1994 while German video game magazine Total! gave it a score of 4.25 out of 6.
