= Golden Joystick Award for Game of the Year =

British video game award

The Golden Joystick Award for Game of the Year is an award presented annually at the Golden Joystick Awards ceremony, which had its winners originally voted in by the British general public, but can now be voted in globally via GamesRadar+. The award is given in honor to the best video game released in a particular year. The first Golden Joystick Awards were held in 1983, with the Ultimate Play the Game–developed shooter Jetpac winning Game of the Year.

The award was initially given to 8-bit computer games, as 8-bit microcomputers were the most popular home video game platforms in the UK market for much of the 1980s. Following the rise of 16-bit home computers and 8-bit game consoles in the late 1980s, they began awarding separate Game of the Year awards for 8-bit computers, 16-bit computers and game consoles from 1989. From 1991, they began awarding a single Game of the Year award for all platforms.

The award was originally given under the Game of the Year name and held this name from the original 1983 ceremony to the 2002 ceremony, with the exception of the 1991/1992 ceremonies, and later again in 2013 and 2014. From 1988 to 1990, the Golden Joystick Awards handed out several Game of the Year awards, for an 8-bit computer game, 16-bit computer game, and console game. During the 1991 ceremony, the award was presented as the Overall Game of the Year (including all systems), in order to distinguish it from another category (16-bit Game of the Year, specifically for 16-bit computers), before switching back for the 1992/93 ceremony. In 1996/97, the top award was once again given under the Game of the Year name. However, the Golden Joystick Awards were put on hiatus until 2002. Returning for one year under its original name, the award was then presented as the Ultimate Game of the Year for the 2003 ceremony, a moniker it held until 2012, and then again from 2015 onwards.

== Winners ==
Year	Game	Developer	Publisher	Genre	Platform(s)	Ref.
1983 (1st)	Jetpac	Ultimate Play the Game	Ultimate Play the Game	Shooter	VIC-20; ZX Spectrum	
1984 (2nd)	Knight Lore	Ultimate Play the Game	Ultimate Play the Game	Action-adventure	ZX Spectrum	
1985 (3rd)	The Way of the Exploding Fist	Beam Software	Melbourne House	Fighting	Commodore 64	
1986 (4th)	Gauntlet	Atari Games	U.S. Gold	Hack and slash	Amstrad CPC; Commodore 64; MSX; ZX Spectrum	
1987 (5th)	Out Run	Sega AM2	U.S. Gold	Arcade racing	Amstrad CPC; Commodore 64; MSX; ZX Spectrum	
1988 (6th)	Operation Wolf (8-bit computers)	Taito	Ocean Software	Light gun shooter	Amstrad CPC; Commodore 64; MSX; ZX Spectrum	
1988 (6th)	Speedball (16-bit computers)	The Bitmap Brothers	Image Works	Sports	Amiga; Atari ST	
1988 (6th)	Thunder Blade (game consoles)	Sega	Sega	Combat flight simulator	Master System	
1989 (7th)	The Untouchables (8-bit computers)	Ocean Software	Ocean Software	Side-scroller	Amstrad CPC; Commodore 64; MSX; ZX Spectrum	
1989 (7th)	Kick Off (16-bit computers)	Dino Dini	Anco Software	Sports	Amiga; Atari ST	
1990 (8th)	Rick Dangerous 2 (8-bit computers)	Core Design	Micro Style	Platform	Amstrad CPC; Commodore 64; ZX Spectrum	
1990 (8th)	Kick Off 2 (16-bit computers)	Dino Dini	Anco Software	Sports	Amiga; Atari ST	
1990 (8th)	Mega Man (8-bit consoles)	Capcom	Nintendo	Action-platformer	NES	
1990 (8th)	John Madden Football (16-bit consoles)	Park Place Productions	Electronic Arts	Sports (American football)	Sega Mega Drive	
1991 (9th)	Sonic the Hedgehog	Sonic Team	Sega	Platform	Sega Mega Drive	
1992 (10th)	Street Fighter II	Capcom	Capcom	Fighting	Super NES	
1994 (12th)	Super Mario All-Stars (consoles)	Nintendo EAD	Nintendo	Platformer	Super NES	
1994 (12th)	The Legend of Zelda: Link's Awakening (handheld)	Nintendo EAD	Nintendo	Platformer	Game Boy	
1996 / 1997 (14th)	Super Mario 64	Nintendo EAD	Nintendo	Platformer	Nintendo 64	
2002 (20th)	Grand Theft Auto III	DMA Design	Rockstar Games	Action-adventure; Third-person shooter	PlayStation 2 Windows; Xbox	
2003 (21st)	Grand Theft Auto: Vice City	Rockstar North	Rockstar Games	Action-adventure; Third-person shooter	PlayStation 2 Windows; Xbox	
2004 (22nd)	Doom 3	id Software	Activision	First-person shooter	Windows	
2005 (23rd)	Grand Theft Auto: San Andreas	Rockstar North	Rockstar Games	Action-adventure; Third-person shooter	PlayStation 2 Windows; Xbox	
2006 (24th)	The Elder Scrolls IV: Oblivion	Bethesda Game Studios	Bethesda Softworks; 2K Games	Action role-playing	Windows; Xbox 360; PlayStation 3	
2007 (25th)	Gears of War	Epic Games	Microsoft Game Studios	Third-person shooter	Windows; Xbox 360	
2008 (26th)	Call of Duty 4: Modern Warfare	Infinity Ward	Activision	First-person shooter	Windows; Xbox 360; PlayStation 3	
2009 (27th)	Fallout 3	Bethesda Game Studios	Bethesda Softworks	Action role-playing	Windows; Xbox 360; PlayStation 3	
2010 (28th)	Mass Effect 2	BioWare	Electronic Arts	Action role-playing	Windows; Xbox 360; PlayStation 3	
2011 (29th)	Portal 2	Valve	Valve; Electronic Arts	Puzzle platformer	Windows; OS X Linux; Xbox 360; PlayStation 3	
2012 (30th)	The Elder Scrolls V: Skyrim	Bethesda Game Studios	Bethesda Softworks	Action role-playing	Windows; Xbox 360; PlayStation 3	
2013 (31st)	Grand Theft Auto V	Rockstar North	Rockstar Games	Action-adventure	PlayStation 3 Windows; Xbox 360	
2014 (32nd)	Dark Souls II	FromSoftware	Bandai Namco Entertainment	Action role-playing	PlayStation 3 Windows; Xbox 360	
2015 (33rd)	The Witcher 3: Wild Hunt	CD Projekt Red	CD Projekt	Action-adventure	PlayStation 4 Windows; Xbox One	
2016 (34th)	Dark Souls III	FromSoftware	Bandai Namco Entertainment	Action role-playing	PlayStation 4 Windows; Xbox One	
2017 (35th)	The Legend of Zelda: Breath of the Wild	Nintendo EPD	Nintendo	Action-adventure	Nintendo Switch; Wii U	
2018 (36th)	Fortnite Battle Royale	Epic Games	Epic Games	Battle royale	Various	
2019 (37th)	Resident Evil 2	Capcom R&D Division 1	Capcom	Survival horror	PlayStation 4 Windows; Xbox One	
2020 (38th)	The Last of Us Part II	Naughty Dog	Sony Interactive Entertainment	Action-adventure	PlayStation 4	
2021 (39th)	Resident Evil Village	Capcom R&D Division 1	Capcom	Survival horror	PlayStation 5 Windows; Xbox Series X/S	
2022 (40th)	Elden Ring	FromSoftware	Bandai Namco Entertainment	Action role-playing	PlayStation 5 Windows; Xbox Series X/S	
2023 (41st)	Baldur's Gate 3	Larian Studios	Larian Studios	Role-playing	PlayStation 5 Windows; Xbox Series X/S	
2024 (42nd)	Black Myth: Wukong	Game Science	Game Science	Action role-playing	PlayStation 5 Windows; Xbox Series X/S	
2025 (43rd)	Clair Obscur: Expedition 33	Sandfall Interactive	Kepler Interactive	Role-playing	PlayStation 5 Windows; Xbox Series X/S	
2026 (44th)	Resident Evil Requiem	Capcom R&D Division 1	Capcom	Survival horror	Nintendo Switch 2 PlayStation 5 Windows; Xbox Series X/S	
