= Kimi to Fit Boxing (TV series) =

Japanese anime television series

- Key visual

キミとフィットボクシング
- Genre: Sports (boxing)
- Created by: Imagineer
- Anime television series
- Directed by: Junpei Morita
- Written by: Junpei Morita
- Music by: Yūsuke Shirato
- Studio: Imagineer; Story Effect
- Original network: Tokyo MX
- Original run: October 1, 2021 – December 17, 2021
- Episodes: 12

Kimi to Fit Boxing (キミとフィットボクシング; "You and Fitness Boxing") is a Japanese anime television series adaptation of the Nintendo Switch game, Fitness Boxing. The series was produced by Japanese studios Imagineer and Story Effect, and it aired from October to December 2021.

== Characters ==
Karen (カレン)
Voiced by: Akari Kitō
Hiro (ヒロ)
Voiced by: Akira Ishida
Janice (ジャニス, Janisu)
Voiced by: Rie Kugimiya
Lin (リン, Rin)
Voiced by: Saori Hayami
Evan (エヴァン, Evu~an)
Voiced by: Yuichi Nakamura
Martina (マルティーナ, Marutīna)
Voiced by: Sumire Uesaka
Sophie (ソフィ, Sofi)
Voiced by: Ami Koshimizu
Laura (ラウラ, Raura)
Voiced by: Atsuko Tanaka
Bernardo (ベルナルド, Berunarudo)
Voiced by: Akio Otsuka

== Broadcast ==
On August 26, 2021, an anime television series adaptation produced by Imagineer and Story Effect was announced. The series was directed and written by Junpei Morita, with motion capture by SOLID CUBE and music composed by Yūsuke Shirato. It aired from October 1 to December 17, 2021, on Tokyo MX. The series ran for 12 episodes and each episode is 5 minutes long.

=== Episode list ===
No.	Title	Original release date
1	"You Are From Today..."; Transliteration: "Kimi wa Kyō kara..." (Japanese: キミは今日から…)	October 1, 2021
2	"Work That Creates a Smile"; Transliteration: "Egao o Umidasu Shigoto" (Japanese: 笑顔を生み出す仕事)	October 8, 2021
3	"I Hope You Find It"; Transliteration: "Mitsukaru to Ii na" (Japanese: 見つかるといいな)	October 15, 2021
4	"I Can Understand Without Saying"; Transliteration: "Iwanakute mo Wakaru wa" (Japanese: 言わなくても分かるわ)	October 22, 2021
5	"Life Can Be Changed"; Transliteration: "Jinsei wa Kaeraremasu yo" (Japanese: 人生は変えられますよ)	October 29, 2021
6	"See You're Comparing Again"; Transliteration: "Hora Mata Kurabeteru" (Japanese: ほらまた比べてる)	November 5, 2021
7	"Don't Open That Door"; Transliteration: "Sono Doa wa Akeru na yo" (Japanese: そのドアは開けるなよ)	November 12, 2021
8	"Aren't Your Legs Shaking"; Transliteration: "Ashi Gakugaku ja nē ka" (Japanese: 足ガクガクじゃねぇか)	November 19, 2021
9	"Because I Want to Win"; Transliteration: "Datte Kachitai jan" (Japanese: だって勝ちたいじゃん)	November 26, 2021
10	"Yeah, I'm Fine"; Transliteration: "Un, Genki Deta" (Japanese: うん、元気でた)	December 3, 2021
11	"I Was Running Away"; Transliteration: "Ore wa Nigete Itan da yo" (Japanese: 俺は逃げていたんだよ)	December 10, 2021
12	"I Am From Today!"; Transliteration: "Watashi wa Kyō kara!" (Japanese: 私は今日から！)	December 17, 2021
