= Active Soccer =

Throw In
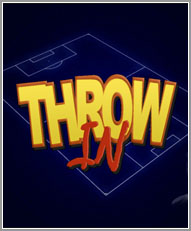
- Throw In Logotype
- Developers: Gianluca Troiano, The Fox Software
- Platforms: PC, Mac, iOS, Android, Playstation 4, Xbox One
- Release: 2000s
- Genre: Sports
- Mode: Single-player or multiplayer (up to 4 players)

Active Soccer is a soccergame series, originally launched as a PC remake in 3D of the game Kick off 2, originally launched as Throw In.

The project was originally started by Gianluca Troiano in cooperation with the Kick Off Association as a remake to the classic Amiga football game Kick Off 2. Several beta versions were released during the first decade of the 21st century and Dino Dini, the programmer behind the Kick Off series praised the result.

In December 2011 The developer announced that they were working on a new game under the working title Throw In 2nd Half. In October 2012 The Fox Software announced that the name of the game would be Active Soccer and that it was released at first for iOS, Android, Windows and Mac OS.

Active Soccer 2 DX was released for Xbox One, PS4, and Steam.

Active Soccer 3 was released in July 2026.

== History ==
Throw In started as a 3D remake of Kick Off 2. The programmer and three times Kick Off 2 World Champion Gianluca Troiano started the project in cooperation with the Kick Off Association in 2004. Several betaversions were released in 2004 and 2005. A transformed version of the game was released in 2006 as Nutella Football Game by the game company Artematica. It was sold in big Italian malls as a promotional gift together with a can of Nutella during the FIFA World Cup 2006. Another transformed version was released as Up Soccer by Artematica.

The Throw In project went on and in 2007 beta 0.8 was released with upgraded graphics and improved gameplay. a few months later in early 2008 beta 0.85 was released. The Throw In beta versions became widely spread and available for download on many game sites. In total the beta versions were downloaded 100,000 times and the trailers for the 0.8 and 0.85 versions had 80,000 views. The programmer behind Kick Off Dino Dini, praised the game.

The Throw In beta versions were just as Kick Off, was primarily developed for joysticks with one button. The gameplay in the betas are close to Kick Off 2 and also have similarities with Sensible Soccer. After beta 0.86 the Throw In project became quiet. There were rumors about a 1.0 version and a Throw In Player Manager but these were never released.

In December 2011 The developer announced that they were working on a new game under the working title Throw In 2nd Half. In 2012 The Fox Software announced that the official name of the game will be Active Soccer and that it will be released for iOS, Android, Windows and Mac. Chris Huelsbeck will write the soundtrack for Active Soccer. The game Active Soccer was first shown at the video conference 2012 at the videogame museum Vigamus in Rome 20 and 21 October. At the conference the Active Soccer booth was visited by Dino Dini the programmer of the classic video game Kick Off.
