= Little Friend =

Little Friend may refer to:

- The Little Friend (Marshall novel), a 1929 novel by Bruce Marshall
- The Little Friend, a 2002 novel by Donna Tartt
- Little Friend (film), a 1934 British film
- Little Friends: Dogs & Cats, a pet simulation video game for the Nintendo Switch
- "Little Friend", a song by Nickelback from the album Curb, 1996
