= DrumUp =

- Initial release: January 4, 2015

Stable release(s)
- Android: 1.9 / June 11, 2020; 4 years ago
- iOS: 1.2 / May 20, 2020; 4 years ago
- Web (Chrome extension): 0.0.0.31 / December 18, 2017; 7 years ago
- Operating system: Android 5.1 or later, iOS 9.0 or later
- Platform: Android, iPhone, iPod Touch, Web
- Available in: English
- Website: drumup.io

DrumUp is a mobile and web application developed for professionals and businesses for content discovery, curation and social media management. The application can be signed into using Twitter, Facebook or LinkedIn.

== History ==
DrumUp was launched in January 2015. The self-funded company was co-founded by Vishal Dutta, an IIT Delhi and IIM Lucknow alumnus, who leads product development, and Sophia Solanki, an IIT Delhi alumnus, who leads marketing. Both of them have several years of experience in the content industry, having run a content services company called Godot Media. Although the development team is based out of Bangalore, the application was first built and launched for the US market.

== Features ==
DrumUp is a content discovery, curation and social sharing platform. It creates personalized content streams for a user based on a set of keywords. The content streams are refreshed daily to help users discover fresh content early. The content suggested by the application is based on its relevance to the keywords and the authority of the source. The application uses advanced natural language processing (NLP) and machine learning algorithms to find relevant content for the users.

The application has several social media content management features. It allows the user to schedule content to post on Twitter, Facebook and LinkedIn. The user can queue custom content and also edit or delete suggested content for sharing. DrumUp users can also connect their blog's RSS feed to their social accounts to post updates from the blog

== Android App ==
The company announced the release of its Android app on May 15, 2015. The app is aimed at professionals who want to track trends and developments in their industry, and manage their social media accounts on-the-go.

== Growth and User Metrics ==
As of June 2015, DrumUp is reported to be used for sharing close to 100,000 micro-content pieces a month on social media.
