= KT Genie Music =

South Korean company

KT Genie Music Corporation
- Native name: 케이티지니뮤직
- Company type: Public
- Traded as: KRX: 043610
- Industry: contents (music)
- Predecessor: Blue Cord Technology Co., Ltd. (as a division)
- Founded: February 7, 1991; 35 years ago
- Headquarters: 6th - 8th floors L7 Hotels Gangnam Tower, 415 Teheran-ro, Samseong-dong, Gangnam-gu, Seoul, South Korea
- Area served: worldwide
- Key people: Kim Hoon-bae (CEO)
- Products: music albums, online services
- Services: production, distribution
- Owner: KT StudioGenie: 35.97% CJ ENM: 15.35% LG U+: 12.70%
- Parent: KT Corporation
- Subsidiaries: Millie's Library
- Website: www.geniemusic.co.kr

KT Genie Music (Korean: 케이티지니뮤직), a subsidiary of KT Corporation, is a South Korean company that specializes in the production and distribution of music content. Its music streaming service is the second most used in South Korea with 2.5 million subscribers as of June 2018.

== History ==
The company's history can be traced from the music contents division of Blue Cord Technology, established in 1991. The same division then owned Muz (now Olleh Music), one of the major music portals in the country. The division was also strengthened by the acquisition of Doremi Media (one of South Korea's well-known music publishers) in 2000.

In 2007, Blue Cord was acquired by KT Freetel, and upon merging with the former, made the music division a separate company named KTF Music. In 2009, the company was renamed as KT Music due to the merger of KTF and its parent KT Corporation.

It acquired KMP Holdings in 2012.

Following the investment of LG Uplus, the company changed its name to Genie Music in March 2017.

In October 2018, Genie Music and CJ ENM's CJ Digital Music merged, with Genie Music being the surviving entity and CJ ENM being the former's second largest shareholder with 15.35%.

In April 2025, "Genie Music" was officially renamed "KT Genie Music".。

== Assets ==
- Genie (online music service)
- Shop&Genie (music service for stores and other businesses)

== Distribution Network ==
=== Present ===
==== Domestic ====
- 143 Entertainment
- Biscuit Entertainment
- GBK Entertainment
- Star Empire Entertainment
- Signal Entertainment Group
- Stone Music Entertainment (digital format only; 2018–present)
  - WakeOne
  - Hi-Lite Records
  - AOMG (with Kakao Entertainment)
  - Amoeba Culture
  - Off The Record Entertainment
  - LM Entertainment
- Happy Face Entertainment (with Kakao Entertainment)
  - HF Music Company
  - Dreamcatcher Company
  - D1CE Company
- Music Factory Entertainment
  - MTN ENTERTAINMENT (with Kakao Entertainment)

==== Foreign ====
- ShowBT Entertainment Philippines Corp (2020–present)
  - SB19

=== Former ===
==== Domestic ====
- Astory Entertainment (2017–2019, now with NHN Bugs)
- Hybe Corporation
  - Belift Lab (2020–2023; all releases now handled by HYBE for physical marketing and YG PLUS for digital marketing)
- J. Tune Camp (defunct)
- Jellyfish Entertainment (2017–2022, now with Kakao Entertainment)
- JYP Entertainment (until 2018, now with Dreamus Company)
- KQ Entertainment (until 2024, now with Sony Music Entertainment Korea and Kakao Entertainment)
- Lion Media (defunct)
- MBK Entertainment (2013–2014; now with Kakao Entertainment; now defunct)
- NH Media
- SM Entertainment (until 2018, now with Dreamus Company)
- Source Music (2010–2016; now with Kakao Entertainment and later on YG Plus)
- Stardom Entertainment (defunct)
- Starkim Entertainment
- Swing Entertainment (until 2023; merged into WakeOne)
- WM Entertainment (2017–2021, now with Sony Music)
- YG Entertainment (until 2019, all releases now distributed by subsidiary YG Plus)
- YMC Entertainment

==== Foreign ====
- Avex Group (until 2018, now with Kakao Entertainment)
- J Storm (until 2018, now with Sony Music Entertainment Korea and Kakao Entertainment)
- King Records 'You be Cool' division (until 2023; defunct after AKB48 moved to EMI Records (Japan)/Universal in 2023)
