= World League Soccer =

1991 video game

- North American cover art
- Developer: C-Lab
- Publishers: JP: Imagineer; NA: Mindscape
- Composer: Kazuo Sawa
- Platforms: Super NES, X68000
- Release: Super NES: JP: 20 September 1991; NA: April 1992; X68000: JP: 29 November 1991
- Genre: Sports
- Modes: Single-player, multiplayer

World League Soccer, known as Pro Soccer (Japanese: プロサッカー, Hepburn: Puro sakkā) in Japan, is an association football-based sports video game developed by C-Lab, and released for the Super Nintendo Entertainment System and X68000 in 1991.

== Gameplay ==
The game is played from an overhead view.

Thie game was ported from the original Amiga version called Kick Off 2, which was one of the most popular soccer game of the early 1990s. The game has a tournament mode in addition to four different pitches (including a plastic pitch which caused controversy in the 1980s for some English football clubs). The game's two-player mode largely requires on luck instead of skill to make plays like goals and free kicks. Each game has a large field along with many of options and an overhead view. Ball handling controls tend to be extremely difficult despite the simplistic approach to soccer. A variety of moves, including the aftertouch, are accessible by only using one button.

== Pro Soccer 68 ==
Pro Soccer 68 was released for the X68000 in 1991. It was developed by SPS and published by Imagineer. Pro Soccer (known in Europe and US as Super Kick Off) was also released for the Game Boy in 1992.

== Reception ==
Reception

Review score
Publication	Score
Mean Machines	55%
