= Quest: Fantasy Challenge =

1999 video game

- Developer: C-Lab
- Publishers: Virgin Interactive Entertainment, Sun Corporation
- Platform: Game Boy Color
- Release: 19 April 1999
- Genre: Action
- Mode: Single-player,

Quest: Fantasy Challenge is a 1999 video game for the Game Boy Color developed by C-Lab and published by Virgin Interactive Entertainment in Europe and Sun Corporation in the United States. The game is a spinoff of the Nintendo 64 title Quest 64, featuring arcade gameplay similar to Dig Dug and Mr. Do!. Upon release, Fantasy Challenge received mixed reviews.

== Gameplay ==
Gameplay screenshot

Players complete 20 levels of gameplay in which they must dig tunnels through the ground to collect gems, open chests and destroy enemies to progress to the next level. There are power-ups, including weapons such as a boomerang, and a book that defeats all enemies in the level. The game features bosses and ten different enemies.

== Reception ==
Reception

Review scores
Publication	Score
AllGame	2/5
IGN	5/10
Pocket Games	2/10

Several critics considered Quest: Fantasy Challenge to be an inferior imitation of the arcade games Dig Dug and Mr. Do!. Craig Harris of IGN felt the game was "straightforward" and "strictly average", writing that the game had a "sluggish" pace and had too many similarities to Mr. Do. Kyle Knight of Allgame stated that the game was a "passable if mediocre substitute" of Dig Dug, but the game's graphics were "weak", its music "annoying", and the gameplay had "slow and unresponsive controls" and broadly similar levels. Pocket Games felt the game was "far too frustrating" and the levels lacked variety.
