= Battle Cross (1994 video game) =

- Cover art
- Developer: A-Max
- Publisher: Imagineer
- Platform: Super Famicom
- Release: JP: December 9, 1994
- Genres: Action; Racing
- Modes: Single-player; Multiplayer

Battle Cross (バトルクロス) is an action racing video game published by Imagineer, which was released exclusively in Japan in 1994 for the Super Famicom.

== Gameplay ==
This video game is reminiscent of Atari's Super Sprint and Badlands. A top-down perspective is used and elements of the video game Bomberman are added in. An automatic steering mode is also available.

The goal of the game is to take a group of small futuristic air bikes and to go around one of the various race tracks. Players race each other to see who makes it to the finish line first. Various hazards are also scattered around each track, from puddles to speed bumps, pinball bumpers and even cannonballs. There are 12 courses (including the hidden bonus course). A "Challenge Mode" is also available.
