= Quest 64 =

1998 video game

- North American cover art
- Developer: Imagineer
- Publishers: NA: THQ; EU: Konami; JP: Imagineer
- Directors: Ichirou Honma; Atsushi Ohsuga; Yasushi Kamegai; Tomokazu Hattori
- Producers: Atsushi Ohsuga; Kouichirou Sakurai
- Writer: Tomoko Suzuki
- Composer: Masamichi Amano
- Platform: Nintendo 64
- Release: NA: June 10, 1998; EU: September 30, 1998; JP: July 9, 1999
- Genre: Role-playing game
- Mode: Single-player

Quest 64 (Holy Magic Century in Europe, Australia, and New Zealand, Eltale Monsters (エルテイル モンスターズ, Eruteiru Monsutāzu) in Japan) is a role-playing video game (RPG) developed by Imagineer for the Nintendo 64. It was released in North America in June 1998 by THQ, Europe in September 1998 by Konami and Japan in July 1999 by Imagineer. It is the first role-playing video game released for the system in North America.

After Quest 64's moderate financial success, a sequel was in consideration by the developer Imagineer. However, only the sequel's story was revealed before it was ultimately cancelled. Imagineer released two other related games for the Game Boy Color, Quest: Brian's Journey and Quest: Fantasy Challenge (a clone of Mr. Do!).

== Plot ==
The game's story is set in Celtland, a fantastic medieval world that resembles Ireland. The playable character is an apprentice mage named Brian. Brian sets off to find his father, who has left the monastery of the mages - the player learns later that his father is looking for a thief who has stolen the "Eletale Book". The player must also collect elemental gems, which have been hoarded by powerful criminals, before confronting the game's final boss.

== Gameplay ==
Similarly to Chrono Trigger, when the player character encounters enemies, instead of changing to a separate battle layout the game simply locks the player character into place and the battle proceeds. The player character's spells work through elemental spirits, with each of the Nintendo 64 controller's four C buttons corresponding to one of the four classic elements (wind, earth, water, and fire).

The game differs from most RPGs in that the experience system is not based upon a traditional "level-up" model. Instead, similarly to Final Fantasy II, experience is gained for specific stats based on how the player performs in battle. If the character gets hit a lot, for instance, defense will increase. Also, whenever the player finds a wispy white spirit, they can choose an element of magic to upgrade (from Fire, Water, Earth, and Wind). Leveling up these elements grants the character new attacks and strengthens existing ones.

The game has no money system, which is unusual for an RPG. Every item is either found in a treasure chest, dropped by a monster, or given to the player character free of charge (if the character doesn't have one already). If Brian runs out of HP, the game will return him to the last inn at which he saved. He retains all spells, items, and experience he has gained before death, but any items used before death will not be returned.

In-game time is tracked with a compass/clock in the HUD, and certain events may either only happen at night or only happen during the day.

== Development ==
The game was announced in early 1997, at which point it was to be titled Eltale (エルテイル) in Japan and Holy Magic Century in all other regions. It was exhibited at Space World in 1997.

Quest 64 was developed by Japanese company Imagineer, while THQ both translated it into English and published it in North America. Despite its Japanese origin, the game would not be released in Japan until much later.

Because the North American and PAL releases of the game were considered too short and easy, Imagineer added new events and tightened some of the repetitive gameplay for the game's Japanese localization. Expectations for the game were high upon release, as it was the first true RPG on the Nintendo 64.

== Reception ==
Reception

Aggregate score
Aggregator	Score
GameRankings	54%

Review scores
Publication	Score
AllGame	2.5/5
Edge	5/10
Electronic Gaming Monthly	3/10 4/10 3.5/10 4.5/10
GamePro	3.5/5
GameRevolution	C−
GameSpot	5.4/10
IGN	5.9/10
N64 Magazine	71%
Next Generation	3/5
Nintendo Power	6.3/10
Super Play (SWE)	70/100

Quest 64 received mixed reviews upon release with GameRankings giving it a score of 54%. Though praised for its high-quality graphics (IGN wrote "Quest proves beyond a doubt that compelling RPG graphics are possible on a cart") and inventive spell system, reviewers criticized it for lacking depth on all fronts: gameplay, storyline, and exploration. GameSpot wrote "Quest 64's individual puzzles and challenges are similarly straightforward. Go to Town #1. Converse with townspeople. Discover that there's a villain scaring everyone and making it impossible to get through Forest #1 to Town #2. To boot, he's stolen Unique Elemental Magic Item #1 from Lord #1." The general conclusion was the game was competent enough to charm gamers who had never played an RPG before, but too simplistic and trite to interest anyone else.

Next Generation reviewed the game, rating it three stars out of five, and stated that "In the end, Quest 64 proves the cartridge-based N64 can be a viable format for RPGs. However, while graphics and sound go a long way, the need for well-told stories and characters you care about has never been more apparent."
