= J-League Dynamite Soccer 64 =

1997 video game

- Developer(s): A-Max
- Publisher(s): Imagineer
- Platform(s): Nintendo 64
- Release: JP: September 1997
- Genre(s): Sports
- Mode(s): Single-player, multiplayer

J-League Dynamite Soccer 64 (Ｊリーグダイナマイトサッカー64) is a soccer game for the Nintendo 64. It was released in Japan in 1997. The game has officially licensed players from Japan's J-League.
