= Dino Dini's Goal =

1993 video game

- Cover art for Sega Mega Drive conversion, Dino Dini's Soccer, showing the Italian Paolo Maldini and the Brazilian Romario.
- Developers: Dino Dini; Eurocom (SNES)
- Publisher: Virgin Games
- Designer: Dino Dini
- Composer: Allister Brimble (Amiga)
- Platforms: Amiga, Atari ST, MS-DOS, Mega Drive, Super NES
- Release: Amiga, Atari ST, MS-DOS: NA: 1993; Sega Mega Drive, SNES: EU: December 1994
- Genre: Sports
- Modes: Single-player, multiplayer

Dino Dini's Goal is a soccer video game released by Virgin Games in 1993. It is considered by many to be the "true" sequel to Kick Off 2 (in preference to Kick Off 3), as Kick Off's creator Dino Dini had moved from Anco Software and was responsible for all Goal's engineering and game design. Goal introduced improved dynamics and A.I. over Kick Off 2, as well as other innovative features, such as multiple camera views. The game shipped 60,000 units on the first day of release.

== Dino Dini's Soccer ==
Dino Dini's Soccer was a conversion of Goal! for the Sega Mega Drive. Dino Dini's Soccer had all the relevant features of the Amiga version and it was graphically superior to it. The game implemented an innovative 4-way play feature.

There was also a conversion to Super NES, developed by Eurocom, but this version was only an interpretation of the game, and Dino was unhappy to have his name associated with it, as he was not responsible for any of that version and had no creative control over it. The SNES version features a different control method, with the ball on sticking to your foot to make running with the ball easier. The game is viewed from above and played up and down the pitch, without the left-to-right option of Goal. Matches can be between 2 or 20 minutes, and the scanner which shows player positions on the rest of the pitch can be moved, resized or disabled. The method of triggering aftertouch onto a pass can be chosen as well.

The game features a variety of tournaments, including the full World Cup and its qualifying rounds, and the European Championships, or individual matches, as well as being able to configure a league or cup tournament to player's specification. Only international teams are included, although their names can be customised. Unlike most soccer games of the time, player ethnicities are accurately depicted.

== Reception ==
Computer Gaming World in April 1994 said that Goal!' "sound effects and animation are merely 'OK'". The magazine predicted that "Kick Off fans will definitely enjoy this one, as will many other soccer fans".
