= Virtual Open Tennis =

1995 video game

- North American box art
- Developer: Imagineer
- Publishers: Acclaim Entertainment; Imagineer (JP)
- Platform: Sega Saturn
- Release: JP: October 27, 1995; NA: May 31, 1996; EU: June 6, 1996
- Genre: Sports
- Modes: Single-player, multiplayer

Virtual Open Tennis is a Sega Saturn video game developed by Imagineer. It was published by Imagineer in Japan on October 27, 1995, and by Acclaim in North America and Europe in 1996.

== Gameplay ==
Virtual Open Tennis is a tennis simulation featuring exhibition matches, tournament competitions and a training mode. Players can select from ten fictional tennis players and compete on courts with different playing surfaces. The game allows players to perform various shots, including lobs, slices, topspin and volleys. Two tournaments are available: the Challengers Cup, intended for beginners, and the more challenging Imagineer World Championship. Exhibition matches support singles and doubles, with up to four simultaneous players using a multitap, or computer-controlled doubles partners. The training mode includes exercises for serving, smashing and returning shots. Matches can be viewed from several camera perspectives, while an on-court indicator helps players anticipate where the ball will land. The game also features action replays.

== Reception ==
Next Generation reviewed the Saturn version of the game, rating it three stars out of five, and stated that "If you're the kind of gamer who's pleased with the way tennis games currently play, then take a look at Virtual Open Tennis. But if squinting to see where that little ball is makes you tremble with rage, then waiting for a serious advance in the tennis videogame is advised."

European reviews were mixed. British publication Sega Saturn Magazine awarded the game 68%, praising its range of camera angles and innovative features, but criticising its cumbersome controls and awkward player animations. French magazine Consoles + was more enthusiastic, awarding 86% and praising its graphics, character animations, soundtrack and variety of shots, although it noted occasional visibility problems and delayed responses to player inputs. German magazine Mega Fun gave the game 66%, criticising its limited graphical detail, slow pace and imprecise controls. Spanish publication Última Generación praised its graphical presentation, while criticising the low-resolution appearance of the players during gameplay.

In Japan, Sega Saturn Magazine awarded Virtual Open Tennis individual reviewer scores of 7, 5 and 7 out of 10. The reviewers offered mixed assessments of its controls and presentation, praising its player animations and inclusion of doubles matches, while criticising unresponsive controls and awkward character movement. In the magazine's final reader rankings, published in March 2000, the game ranked 906th among 945 rated Saturn titles, receiving an average reader score of 3.4779 out of 10.

== Legacy ==
In October 2018, the game's rights were acquired by Canadian production company Liquid Media Group along with other titles originally owned by Acclaim Entertainment.
