= The Battle of Olympus =

1988 video game

- NES cover art
- Developers: Infinity; Radical Entertainment (Game Boy)
- Publishers: JP: Imagineer; NA: Broderbund; EU: Nintendo; EU: Imagineer (Game Boy)
- Designer: Yukio Horimoto
- Programmer: Yukio Horimoto
- Artist: Reiko Oshida
- Writer: Reiko Oshida
- Composers: Kazuo Sawa; Paul Wilkinson (Game Boy)
- Platforms: NES, Game Boy
- Release: NES: JP: March 28, 1988; NA: January 1990; EU: September 26, 1991; Game Boy: EU: 1993
- Genre: Action role-playing game
- Mode: Single-player

The Battle of Olympus (Note: Ai no Densetsu Olympus no Tatakai (愛の伝説 オリュンポスの戦い, "Legend of Love Battle of Olympus")) is a 1988 action role-playing video game for the Nintendo Entertainment System. The game's story is a retelling of the Greek myth of Orpheus and his retrieval of his wife from the underworld.

It was released in North America in 1990, and released in Europe in 1991. A port for the Game Boy was released.

== Plot ==
The Battle of Olympus takes place in ancient Greece which is being terrorized by Hades, the dark ruler of the underworld.

Helene, the lover of Orpheus, is kidnapped by Hades. A top-down map of Greece shows various dungeons and ancient Greek city-states for the player to visit on their journey. There are eight locations on the map in which the player can go to which include Arcadia (starting area), Argolis, Attica, Crete, Laconia, Peloponnes, Phrygia, and Phthia.

Swords, shields, and crystals help to provide offensive power and defensive strength for the player. Three fragments of love are there to remind Orpheus of his affection for Helene. Hades rules his dominion in Tartarus, where his strongest minions live alongside him.

During his adventure, Orpheus needs to meet the Greek gods and gain their favor, starting with Zeus, the leader of the Olympian gods, who encourages the other gods to grant Orpheus powers. These powers are in the form of a weapon, a shield, and other special equipment, among them a harp, which summons Pegasus to carry Orpheus to far locations. As the game progresses, players are exposed to various forms of upgraded weaponry. The player starts off with a basic wooden club. The player later obtains items such as the Staff of Fennel (also known as a thyrsus, which is able to project a fireball), Nymph's Sword, and the Divine Sword (able to project a lightning bolt).

The game features encounters with mythological creatures such as the Taurus, Lamia, cyclops, centaur, Talos, Minotaur, Graeae, Cerberus, Stymphalian birds, Nemean lion, and also a Siren. Players must fight their way deep into the underworld, fight and defeat Hades, and save Helene. Several items depicted in the Greek mythology are acquired, such as the Harp of Apollo, the Sword of Hephaestus, the Staff of Prometheus, and the Sandals of Hermes.

== Gameplay ==
Screenshot of the game

Primarily a sidescroller with some light platforming, the player is a hero with a sword and shield, while just a handful of secondary items come along later in the game, mostly for the purpose of advancement as the protagonist move to new areas. He can find upgrades to maximize health, protection, and speed. The biggest differences in combat from Zelda II are the lack of the downward stab in midair, and the lack of the sword beam at full health. However, The Battle of Olympus does have a sword later in the game that can shoot beams, but doing so damages the health bar if a certain item is not found first.

The Battle of Olympus is somewhat non-linear; there are also some optional side quests that can make the game easier in the long run, leading to a secret item or power-up from one of the gods.

The final battle brings to the Temple of Hades in fight with the ruler of the underworld in a two-stage event. The first is a blind fight against a shadow reflection, and then the final form is of Hades himself.

== Development ==
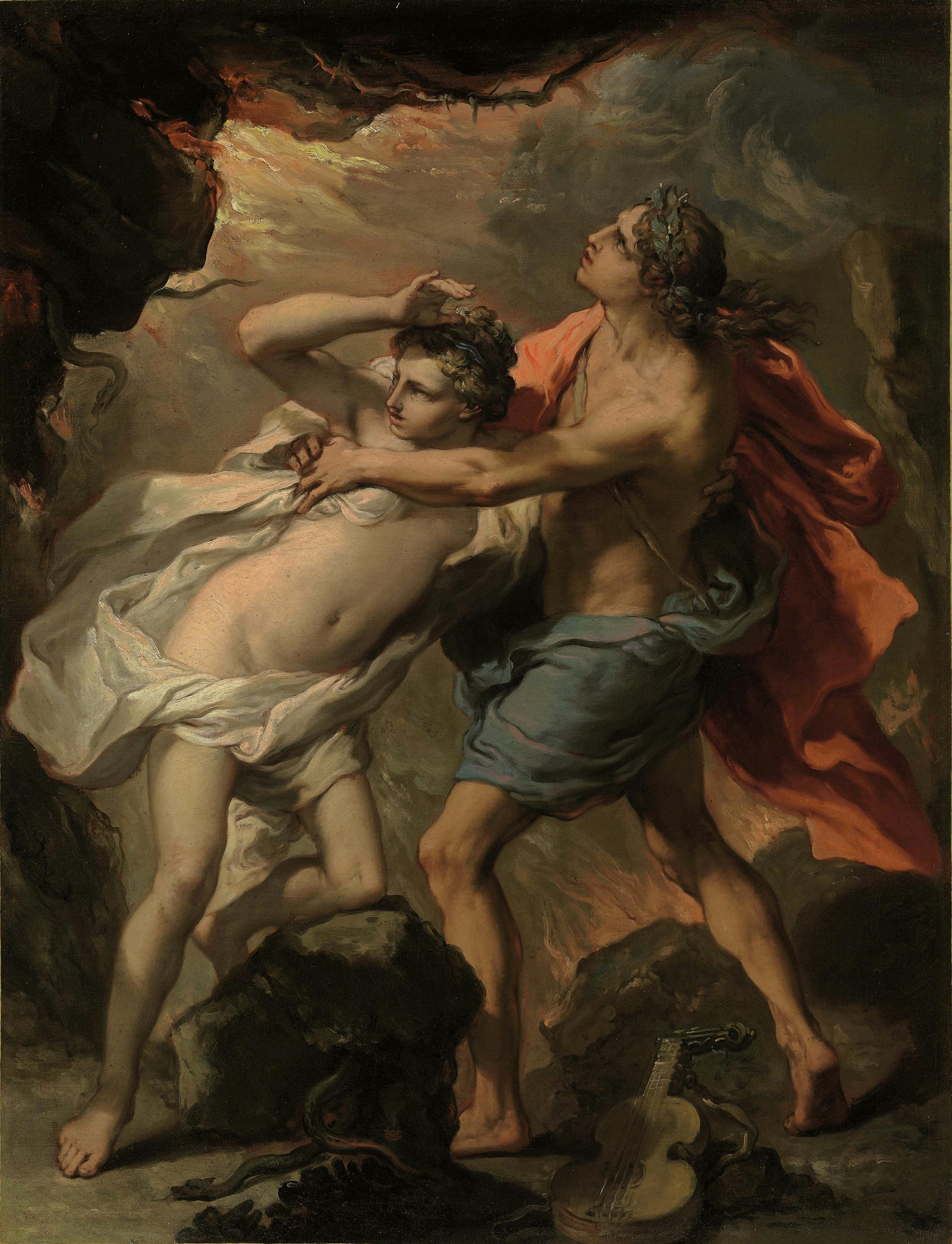
Orpheus and Eurydice by Gaetano Gandolfi

The Battle of Olympus was developed by Infinity, and was the first game from the company. The development team for the game was quite small, with only three members. Yukio Horimoto served as designer and programmer. Kazuo Sawa was the composer, and Reiko Oshida, Horimoto's future wife, did story and graphics. Horimoto said that he and Oshida were dating at the time, and had wanted to work on a game saying: "We fell in love and wanted to make our game together, so we talked about the game concept for a long time."

Horimoto explained that "I like Greek myths and legends, so we decided to base our game on those legends. Given those circumstances, we talked about the game and our mood influenced it."

Designer Horimoto drew inspiration from Zelda II: The Adventure of Link for gameplay. Similarities include a final confrontation with a shadow, similar character abilities, and the general appearance of the game. Horimoto explained that "I wanted to make the same kind of game, and so many parts of the game, like the player's attacking motion, ducking motion, and jumping motion: They were all influenced by The Legend of Zelda."

It was one of several NES games inspired by Zelda II, which also include Moon Crystal.

== Release ==
It was published by Imagineer as "Olympus no Tatakai" and released in Japan on March 28, 1988. In North America, it was published by Broderbund and released in January 1990. In Europe, it was published by Nintendo and released in 1991.

The game was ported to the Game Boy by Canadian developer Radical Entertainment in 1993 and published by Imagineer for the European market only. In 2026, the release of a new version for the Steam platform was announced which is currently in early access. The new version is made by the original development team, and will be their last game before retirement.

== Reception ==
Reception

Review scores
Publication	Score
Famitsu	28/40
Mean Machines	79%
Joypad	88%
The Day	10/10

Japanese game magazine Famitsu gave it a score of 28 out of 40. Reviewers noted similarities between the game and to the earlier game, Zelda II: The Adventure of Link.

Retrospective analysis was also positive. In 2011, Eurogamer writer John Teti praised the game. In 2013, Ars Technica staff praised the game.

In 2026, Polygon listed it as one of the ten best NES games not on the Nintendo Switch.
