= Virtual Volleyball =

1995 video game

- Sega Saturn cover
- Developer: SIMS
- Publisher: Imagineer
- Director: Ichiro Honma
- Producer: Takayuki Kamikura
- Programmers: Takeshi Kataoka; Yoshiki Sawamura
- Artists: Atushi Yamamoto; Kengo Arai; Masahiro Kanno
- Composer: Keisuke Nishino
- Platforms: Sega Saturn, PlayStation
- Release: Sega Saturn: JP: July 21, 1995; PlayStation: JP: June 7, 1996
- Genre: Sports
- Modes: Single-player, multiplayer

Virtual Volleyball (Note: Japanese: バーチャル バレーボール, Hepburn: Bācharu Barēbōru) is a sports video game developed by SIMS and published by Imagineer for the Sega Saturn in Japan in 1995. Imagineer re-released the game on the PlayStation as Victory Spike (Note: Japanese: ヴィクトリー・スパイク, Hepburn: Vuikutorī Supaiku) in 1996.

== Gameplay ==
Virtual Volleyball is the first volleyball game using polygons to be published for any game system.

== Reception ==
Reception

Review scores
Publication	Score
Famitsu	24/40 (SAT)
Joypad	1/5
Mean Machines Sega	61% (SAT)
Next Generation	1/5 (SAT)
Ação Games	7/10 (SAT); 6/10 (PS)
Gamers	3/5
Sega Power	31% (SAT)
Sega Pro	39% (SAT)
Sega Saturn Magazine (JP)	18/30 (SAT)
Super GamePower	3.2/5 (PS)
Ultimate Future Games	25% (SAT)
Última Generación	64/100

Next Generation reviewed the Saturn version of the game, rating it one star out of five, and stated, "There are inherent problems in doing a volleyball game when considering the matter of trying to control an entire team, but Virtual Volleyball seems to make no effort to solve any of these problems, leaving the gamer with an extremely vacant feeling."
