= Anubis of the Moon's Surface =

- Super Famicom cover art
- Developer: Multimedia Intelligence Transfer
- Publisher: Imagineer
- Platform: Super Famicom
- Release: Super Famicom: JP: 22 December 1995
- Genre: Visual novel
- Mode: Single player

Anubis of the Moon's Surface (Note: Japanese: 月面のアヌビス, Hepburn: Getsumen no Anubis; lit. Anubis on the Moon) is a 1995 visual novel. The game has a science fiction setting of a lunar base on the moon. Depending on the players actions in the game, the protagonist Keisuke changes his personality to move forward with the story.

The game was at at least 35% completion by late October 1995 and was published along with a similar game from Imagineer, Zakuro no Aji. Famicom Tsūshin found the game did not give enough options for the players to move the story in different directions and compared it with Zakuro no Aji. The Japanese book Perfect Guide to Nostalgic Super Famicom (2016) included it on their list of the best horror games for the Super Famicom, finding it to be a lesser known but good horror sound novel.

== Gameplay ==
Anubis of the Moon's Surface is a sound novel. Mark Kretzschmar and Sara Raffel, authors of The History and Allure of Interactive Visual Novels (2023), described the term used to primarily define Japanese games that rely on graphics and sounds instead of puzzles to tell a story and was more generally interchangeable with visual novels.

The game is progressed by pressing the buttons on the controller. In the game, the story changes on the action-oriented choices, but also on your choice of the emotional response to certain situations. For example, if the player chooses an aggressive choice, the next choices will follow suit and be more aggressive and assertive.

== Plot ==
Anubis of the Moon's Surface has a science fiction setting of a lunar base on the moon. The game is set in the future, where the protagonist Keisuke is a researcher along with his female companion travels to the base via a space ship. Aboard the craft, he is involved in an accident which makes him wake up with no memory.

The game has over 20 different endings.

== Development and release ==
Famicom Tsūshin said that by October 27, 1995 two titles, Anubis of the Moon's Surface and Zakuro no Aji from the Japanese publisher Imagineer were at about 35% completion. Planning and development of the game was handled by Multimedia Intelligence Transfer.

Anubis of the Moon's Surface was released on December 22, 1995 for the Super Famicom. Zakuro no Aji was released on the same date. Anubis of the Moon's Surface makes reference to Zakuro no Aji's title within the game.

== Reception ==
Reception

Review score
Publication	Score
Famicom Tsūshin	6/10, 6/10, 6/10, 5/10

In Famicom Tsūshin, the game was reviewed by a roundtable of four critics. Two critics compared it to the film Alien (1979) while a third says that while the games story moves at a brisk pace, they couldn't help but feel unsatisfied by it treading familiar territories. Another felt the characters were not developed enough so when incidents occur in the story, you did not emphasize with them. Two reviewers felt that there weren't enough times for the player to choose what direction the narrative would take. One said that Zakuro no Aji had more choices while another say that after playing the other game, it would be inevitable that Anubis of the Moon's Surface would not feel fresh.

In the book Perfect Guide to Nostalgic Super Famicom (2016), the game was included on their list of the top horror games for the Super Famicom. It was described as a lesser known, but good horror sound novel. While Imagineer would publish Anubis on the Moon and Zakuro no Aji, the company would have a long gap before publishing later adventure games such as Path of Mystery: A Brush with Death (2025).

== See also ==
- List of Super Nintendo Entertainment System games
- Video games in Japan
