= Kiratto Kaiketsu! 64 Tanteidan =

1998 video game

- Developer: Pandora Box
- Publisher: Imagineer
- Platform: Nintendo 64
- Release: JP: October 23, 1998
- Genre: Party
- Modes: Single player Multiplayer

Kiratto Kaiketsu! 64 Tanteidan (キラッと解決! 64探偵団; lit. "Shining and solving! 64 Detective Club") is a party game for the Nintendo 64. It was released in Japan on October 23, 1998.

== Development ==
The game was developed by Pandora Box Co. Ltd, a company founded in January 1989.

== Reception ==
Reception

Review score
Publication	Score
N64 Magazine	60%
