= The Little Friend (Marshall novel) =

Book by Bruce Marshall

- Author: Bruce Marshall
- Language: English
- Publication date: 1929
- Publication place: Scotland
- Media type: Print (Hardback)
- Pages: 299
- Preceded by: High Brows (1929)
- Followed by: The Rough House, a possibility (1930)

The Little Friend is a 1929 novel by Scottish writer Bruce Marshall.

== Plot summary ==
James Garrett is the “Little Friend” of several young women. Whether or not this is a good thing for these ladies is the issue studied in this tragicomic novel.

Garrett meets Effie, the lovely daughter of a local pastor, while studying for the ministry at St. Andrews, a university in Scotland. He falls in love with Effie only moments after meeting her. They are inseparable, until, just days before his graduation–ordination, and the day after their first sexual encounter, she is killed in a traffic accident.

Despondent and disillusioned, he abandons his intended pastoral career and takes a job as an ad writer with Paloma, the American manufacturer of a very successful line of toothpaste.

The company sends him to Paris where he meets Marjorie, a worldly, promiscuous and beautiful British expatriate. He quickly abandons her when his company assigns him to Barcelona.

On the train to his new job, he meets an English family, the Nicholsons, also traveling to Barcelona. The daughter, Molly, becomes infatuated with Garrett. His feelings towards her are more ambiguous.

The next player in this drama is Pepita. A fiery and lovely poor woman, Pepita works in a brothel since “I can’t keep body and soul together on what is paid by shoe stores.”

Garrett meets her when he and his new coworkers end a drunken debauch by visiting her place of employment. Garrett is intrigued by both her attractiveness and the fact that, while she is willing to engage in a wide range of intimate sexual activities, she refuses to kiss him.

Garrett shuffles between Molly and Pepita, keeping their existence a secret to the other. But Pepita also has another admirer, Miguelito, an up-and-coming young bullfighter.

Pepita, however is frustrated by Miguelito's many infidelities and eventually gives him up after he abandons and humiliates her for an assignation with Marjorie, who has come to Barcelona to attempt the consummation of her seduction of Garrett.

After considerable reflection, Garrett offers to support Pepita if she will give up prostitution. She agrees and finds herself growing more committed and more in love with him. As her love for him grows, Pepita realizes that maintaining their unmarried sexual relationship is sinful and ends sexual activities with him.

Garrett, however, has continued his flirtation with Molly all during his relationship with Pepita. Garrett now realizes that Molly is also hoping he will marry her. Weighing his two possibilities, Garrett decides that his chances of a happy life are higher with Molly, with whom he shares many cultural affinities, than with Pepita, whose habits and expectations are “foreign” to him.

The novel ends with Pepita reentering the brothel.

Garret has proven himself to be a “little” friend. His irresolute and selfish behavior has symbolically led to Effie's death, Pepita's return to immorality and Marjorie's continuation in a life of debauchery. The reader is left to contemplate what lies in wait for Molly.
