= Imagineer (Japanese company) =

Japanese publisher

Imagineer Co., Ltd.
- Native name: イマジニア株式会社
- Romanized name: Imajinia kabushiki gaisha
- Type: Public KK
- Traded as: JASDAQ: 4644
- Industry: Content industry, Video games
- Founded: January 27, 1986; 40 years ago
- Headquarters: Shinjuku-ku, Tokyo, Japan
- Key people: Takayuki Kandō, Representative Director, Chairman, and CEO; Kenzo Sumioka, Representative Director, President, and COO
- Products: Medabots series
- Number of employees: 128 (31, March 2021)
- Website: imagineer.co.jp

Imagineer Co., Ltd. (イマジニア株式会社, Imajinia kabushiki gaisha) is a Japanese company. They are part of the content industry, providing content and services regarding characters, games, education, and more.

== History ==
Imagineer Co., Ltd. was established on January 27, 1986 (registered on June 1, 1977) in Shinjuku-ku, Tokyo, with the goal of developing, manufacturing and selling game software. They acquired the rights to release overseas games in Japan, such as SimCity which they published for PC. They have also worked with companies like Sanrio Co., Ltd. on games featuring popular characters such as Hello Kitty.

Imagineer developed the Super Nintendo Entertainment System version of Populous, having acquired the rights from Les Edgar. At the time, the company was working with Nintendo. Imagineer also publishes the Medabots game series.

In 2016, Imagineer fully absorbed their video game subsidiary company, Rocket Company, merging into one company.

== Games developed or published ==
Title	Platform	Release date
3D Lemmings	Sega Saturn	August 23, 1996
99 Nendohan: Eitango Center 1500	Game Boy	July 10, 1998
Anubis of the Moon's Surface	Super Famicom	December 22, 1995
Aqua Aqua	PlayStation 2	November 2, 2000
Atelier Elie GB	Game Boy Color	January 8, 2000
Atelier Marie GB	Game Boy Color	January 8, 2000
Bad Batsumaru	Game Boy Color	August 10, 2001
Bardysh: Kromeford no Juunintachi	PC	August 24, 1999
Battle Cross	Super Famicom	December 9, 1994
The Battle of Olympus	Family Computer	March 28, 1988
Big Mountain 2000	Nintendo 64	December 26, 1998
Bikkuriman 2000 Charging Card GB	Game Boy Color	June 10, 2000
Chōkūkan Night: Pro Yakyū King	Nintendo 64	December 20, 1996
Dear Daniel no Sweet Adventure: Kitty-Chan o Sagashite	Game Boy Color	July 19, 2000
Doom	PC-9801	December 9, 1994
Doom	Super Famicom	March 1, 1996
Elite	NES	1991
Fairy Kitty no Kaiun Jiten	Game Boy Color	December 11, 1998
Fighters Destiny	Nintendo 64	January 26, 1998
Fighter Destiny 2	Nintendo 64	August 27, 1999
Fitness Boxing	Nintendo Switch	December 20, 2018
Fitness Boxing 2: Rhythm and Exercise	Nintendo Switch	December 3, 2020
Fitness Boxing 3: Your Personal Trainer	Nintendo Switch	December 5, 2024
Fitness Boxing: Fist of the North Star	Nintendo Switch	March 3, 2023
Fitness Boxing feat. Hatsune Miku: Isshoni Exercise	Nintendo Switch	March 7, 2024
Galaxy Robo	Super Famicom	March 11, 1994
GB Basketball	Game Boy	March 19, 1993
Gessou! Dangun Racer Onsoku Buster: Dangun Tama	Game Boy Color	October 12, 2001
G-O-D: Mezame yoto Yobu Koe ga Kikoe	Super Famicom	December 20, 1996
GT 64: Championship Edition	Nintendo 64	October 30, 1998
Gudetama: Okawari Ikagassuka	Nintendo 3DS	December 8, 2016
Hello Kitty no Magical Museum	Game Boy Color	April 28, 1999
Hello Kitty no Beads Koubou	Game Boy Color	July 17, 1999
Hello Kitty no Sweet Adventure: Daniel Kun ni Aitai	Game Boy Color	July 19, 2000
Hello Kitty to Dear Daniel no Dream Adventure	Game Boy Color	April 14, 2001
Hello Kitty Collection: Miracle Fashion Maker	Game Boy Advance	October 19, 2001
Hero Hero Kun	Game Boy Color	February 9, 2001
Houkago in Beppin Jogakuin	Super Famicom	February 3, 1995
Isaki Shuugorou no Keiba Hisshou Gaku	Family Computer	March 20, 1990
J-League Dynamite Soccer 64	Nintendo 64	September 5, 1997
Kaitouranma Miyabi (快刀乱麻 雅)	PlayStation	January 21, 1999
Kanken Training 2	Nintendo 3DS	July 20, 2017
Kevin Keegan's Player Manager	SNES	October 1993
Kick Off	NES	July 22, 1992
Kiki & Lala's Twinkle Puzzle	iOS	March 12, 2018
Kiki & Lala's Twinkle Puzzle	Android	March 12, 2018
Kiratto Kaiketsu! 64 Tanteidan	Nintendo 64	October 23, 1998
Las Vegas Dream 2	PlayStation	February 28, 1997
Lemmings	PC-9801	December 17, 1991
Lemmings	X68000	April 17, 1992
Lemmings	FM Towns	April 1992
Lemmings	Game Boy	September 23, 1993
Let's Play Curling!!	Nintendo Switch	February 10, 2022
Little Friends: Dogs & Cats	Nintendo Switch	December 6, 2018
Little Friends: Puppy Island	Nintendo Switch	2023
Lost Sword: Shichi Wareta Seiken	PlayStation	March 12, 1998
Mahjong Hōrōki Classic	Nintendo 64	August 1, 1997
Medarot	Game Boy	November 28, 1997
Medarot Parts Collection	Game Boy	March 20, 1998
Medarot Parts Collection 2	Game Boy	May 29, 1998
Medarot: Perfect Edition	WonderSwan	May 4, 1999
Medarot 2	Game Boy Color	July 23, 1999
Medarot 2 Parts Collection	Game Boy Color	October 29, 1999
Medarot R	PlayStation	November 25, 1999
Medarot: Card Robottle	Game Boy Color	March 10, 2000
Medarot R Parts Collection	PlayStation	March 16, 2000
Medarot 3	Game Boy Color	July 23, 2000
Medarot 3 Parts Collection: Z Kara no Chousenjou	Game Boy Color	November 24, 2000
Medarot 4	Game Boy Color	March 23, 2001
Medarot Navi	Game Boy Advance	September 7, 2001
Medarot 5: Susutake Mura no Tenkousei	Game Boy Color	December 14, 2001
Shingata Medarot	Game Boy Advance	December 16, 2004
Medarot Classics	Nintendo 3DS	December 21, 2017
Medarot S: Unlimited Nova	iOS	January 23, 2020
Medarot S: Unlimited Nova	Android	January 23, 2020
Medarot Classics Plus	Nintendo Switch	November 12, 2020
Mega-Lo-Mania	X68000	March 19, 1993
Mega-Lo-Mania	PC-9801	March 19, 1993
Mega-Lo-Mania	FM Towns	March 1993
Mega-Lo-Mania	Super Famicom	July 23, 1993
Melty Lancer: Ginga Shoujo Keisatsu 2086	PlayStation	March 22, 1996
Melty Lancer: Ginga Shoujo Keisatsu 2086	Sega Saturn	December 13, 1996
Melty Lancer: Re-inforce	PlayStation	December 4, 1997
Melty Lancer: Re-inforce	Sega Saturn	May 21, 1998
Merriment Carrying Caravan	PlayStation	August 6, 1998
Might and Magic: Day of the Destroyer	PlayStation 2	September 6, 2001
Mr. Do!	Super Famicom	July 23, 1995
MRC: Multi-Racing Championship	Nintendo 64	July 18, 1997
Populous 2	X68000	August 28, 1992
Populous 2	Super Famicom	January 22, 1993
Populous 2	PC-9801	February 5, 1993
Populous 2	FM Towns	February 1993
Populous Gaiden	Game Boy	May 28, 1993
Power Monger	X68000	October 25, 1991
Power Monger	PC-9801	October 25, 1991
Power Monger	FM Towns	May 1992
Power Monger	Super Famicom	March 26, 1993
Pretty Fighter X	Sega Saturn	June 16, 1995
Quarantine	3DO	September 14, 1995
Quest 64	Nintendo 64	July 9, 1999
Quest: Brian's Journey	Game Boy Color	January 15, 2000
Sanrio Time Net	Game Boy Color	November 27, 1998
Sanrio Uranai Party	Game Boy	December 5, 1997
Shikakei Atama o Kore Kusuru: Joushiki no Ka		
Shikakei Atama o Kore Kusuru: Kanji no Tatsujin		
Shikakei Atama o Kore Kusuru: Keisan no Tatsujin		
Shikakei Atama o Kore Kusuru: Nanmon no Ka		
Shikakei Atama o Kore Kusuru: Zukei no Tatsujin		
SimCity 2000	PC-9801	1994
SimCity Jr.	Super Famicom	July 26, 1996
SimCity	PC-9801	September 7, 1990
SimCity	X68000	September 7, 1990
SimEarth	PC-9801	September 6, 1991
SimEarth	FM Towns	September 1991
SimEarth	Super Famicom	December 29, 1991
SimEarth	X68000	May 29, 1992
Spacenet: Cosmo Red		
Sumikko Gurashi: Puzzling Ways	iOS	July 12, 2016
Sumikko Gurashi: Puzzling Ways	Android	July 12, 2016
Sumi Sumi: Matching Puzzle	iOS	January 31, 2018
Sumi Sumi: Matching Puzzle	Android	January 31, 2018
Super Euro Soccer 2000	Dreamcast	April 6, 2000
Super Loopz		
Super Turrican	NES	1992
Wolfenstein 3D	SNES	February 1994
Wolfenstein 3D	Sega Genesis	Cancelled 1994
Super Wrestle Angels	Super Famicom	December 16, 1994
Suzuki Alstare Extreme Racing		
Rilakkuma Farm	iOS	August 18, 2019
Rilakkuma Farm	Android	August 18, 2019
Rilakkuma na Mainichi	Game Boy Advance	April 28, 2005
Tip Off	Game Boy	March 19, 1993
Tsume Shogi Hyakuban Shoubu		
Virtual Open Tennis	Sega Saturn	October 27, 1995
Virtual Volleyball	Sega Saturn	July 21, 1995
Virtual Volleyball	PlayStation	June 7, 1996
Virtuoso		
Waka Taka Ōzumō: Brothers Dream Match	Super Famicom	November 12, 1993
Wetrix GB	Nintendo 64	November 27, 1998
Wetrix GB	Game Boy Color	October 29, 1999
World League Soccer	SNES	September 20, 1991
Zool: Majū Tsukai Densetsu	Nintendo 64	June 11, 1999
