= Super Turrican (1992 video game) =

- Developer: Rainbow Arts
- Publisher: Imagineer
- Designer: Manfred Trenz
- Programmer: Manfred Trenz
- Artist: Manfred Trenz
- Composer: Manfred Trenz
- Series: Turrican
- Platform: Nintendo Entertainment System
- Release: EU: 1992
- Genre: Run and gun
- Mode: Single-player

Super Turrican is a 1992 run and gun video game developed by Rainbow Arts and published by Imagineer for the Nintendo Entertainment System. It is the third game in the Turrican series.

== Gameplay ==
Gameplay screenshot

Many changes were made in comparison to the original games. This includes four difficulty settings, the ability to run faster, no time limit and no checkpoint so the player must restart the level after dying.

== Synopsis ==
Super Turrican for Nintendo Entertainment System uses the same story premise previously featured in the instruction manual of Turrican II: The Final Fight, which differs from its actual story as seen in the introductory sequence and takes place in the setting of fictional planet Landorin. A long time ago, in a galaxy far, far away, brave rebellious fighters destroyed the menacing hordes of The Machine and its tyranny-spreading satellite, which circled the planet of the brave, the planet called Landorin. The evil moon was gone, but Landorin was not free. The Machine still ruled the surface of the planet. The Landorins retreated to the inner core of their world to await their inevitable death. The machines and mutants, however, went on to roam through the deserted ruins of a long-lost paradise in search of the entrance to the secret caves. Before the Landorins retreated, they managed to send a desperate cry for help: A last radio signal floats through the endless reaches of the tri-solar system and off to the furthest reaches of the universe. The cry was heard by a man with the courage to face the hordes and free the last survivors of Landorin, a man on his most dangerous adventure ever, Turrican.

== Development and release ==
Super Turrican for the Nintendo Entertainment System was developed by series creator Manfred Trenz alone and it is roughly based on the first two Turrican games. In a 2006 interview with Retro Gamer, Trenz stated he felt unsatisfied with the final game due to the lack of gameplay elements from earlier entries and the same difficulty level as a result of a short development cycle. The NES version of Super Turrican was also the only game in the series scored by Trenz. To compose the soundtrack, he used a sound driver programmed by David Whittaker, which he then edited to use with the game. The final boss originated from Aldynes. Super Turrican for the NES was only published in Europe by Imagineer in 1992 and was never released outside European territories.

== Reception ==
Reception

Review scores
Publication	Score
Aktueller Software Markt	8/12
Consoles +	88%
Joypad	75%
Joystick	79%
Player One	75%
Superjuegos	74,4/100
Total!	77%
Computer+Videogiochi	81/100
Digital Press	8.5/10
Game Power	82%
N-Force	77/100
Nintendo Game Zone	84/100
Nintendo Magazine System	91/100
Nintendomagasinet	4/10, 3/10

Super Turrican on the NES received generally favorable reception.
