= Quest: Brian's Journey =

2000 GBC role-playing video game

- North American box art
- Developer(s): Atelier Double
- Publisher(s): NA: Sunsoft; JP: Imagineer
- Platform(s): Game Boy Color
- Release: JP: January 15, 2000; NA: January 23, 2000
- Genre(s): Role-playing game
- Mode(s): Single-player

Quest: Brian's Journey is a 2000 role-playing video game published in North America by Sunsoft for the Game Boy Color. The game's title screen instead displays the title as Quest RPG: Brian's Journey.

The original Japanese version was published by Imagineer under the title Elemental Tale - Jack's Great Adventure: Satan's Counterattack (Elemental Tale: ジャックの大冒険 大魔王の逆襲, Elemental Tale - Jack no Daibouken: Daimaou no Gyakushuu). This game is a demake of another Imagineer product, the Nintendo 64 game Quest 64.

== Plot ==
The game's story is set in Celtland, a fantastic medieval world that resembles Ireland. The plot is an expanded version of Quest 64's plot: the playable character is an apprentice mage named Brian. He originally sets off to find his father who has left the monastery of the mages; the player later learns that his father is looking for a thief who has stolen the "Eletale Book". The player must also collect elemental amulets, which have been hoarded by powerful criminals and are integral in the defeat of the game's final boss.

== Gameplay ==
Much like in the Nintendo 64 version, the player controls the protagonist, Brian, moving around the game's locations from an overhead perspective. The players level up the character's four elemental skills using experience points gained from fighting enemies in order to learn new spell combinations.

== Reception ==
Reception

Review score
Publication	Score
IGN	4/10

IGN scored the game 4 out of 10, citing the game's innovative battle system but heavily criticizing the bland story. The game also received criticism for including "watered down" and over-simplified RPG elements.
