= Player Manager =

1990 football management video game

- Developers: Dino Dini; Anco Software
- Publisher: Anco Software
- Platforms: Amiga, Atari ST
- Release: 1990
- Genre: Sports game
- Mode: Single-player

Player Manager is a football management game, released for the Amiga and Atari ST in 1990. It was notable for being the first game to combine both managing the team and playing as a single player. The match engine borrowed heavily from the Kick Off match engine, which was developed by Dino Dini and Anco Software, who also created Player Manager. It was the first game in the Player Manager series.

== Gameplay ==
Players would take control of a third division side as player-manager, acting in both managing and playing aspects. The latter option was optional, since players could choose whether to control the player only or the entire team from the outset. They can opt to do neither, if they choose not to play the matches personally.

== Magazine reviews ==
- ST Action - A stroke of pure genius.
- The One - An exceptional football management sim. Astounding depth, most involved, rewarding and playable.
- ACE - Successfully blends challenging soccer management with frantic end to end arcade action.
- New Comp Express - The sheer depth is incredible. A definitive management game.
- Commodore User - At last a management game that requires true management skills - a winner 94%
- ST Format - Brilliant. 93%
- Amiga Format - Enthralling and addictive. 93%
- Zzap!64 - Best football management game ever written. 92%

== Remake ==
A remake of the game was in development for iPhone, but was shelved and never released.

== Sequel ==
A sequel, Player Manager 2, was released in 1995.
