= Little Friends: Dogs & Cats =

2018 video game

- North American cover art
- Developer: Imagineer
- Publishers: JP: Imagineer; AS: Arc System Works; WW: Sold Out Games
- Engine: Unity
- Platform: Nintendo Switch
- Release: JP: December 6, 2018; NA: May 27, 2019; EU: May 28, 2019; AU: May 28, 2019
- Genre: Pet-raising simulation
- Mode: Single-player

Little Friends: Dogs & Cats is a pet simulation video game developed by Imagineer exclusively for the Nintendo Switch. The game was released on December 6, 2018, in Japan, May 27, 2019 in North America and May 28, 2019, in Europe and Australia. The game was announced in September 2018 in an issue of Famitsu magazine. A sequel, Little Friends: Puppy Island was released in May 2023.

== Gameplay ==
The game offers a variety of puppies and kittens which the players can interact with. Activities include playing, feeding, petting, and dressing up the pets to develop a bond with them. Each pet contains different personality traits, which determines their likes and dislikes for certain food and activities. Playing with the pet using their favorite toys allows the player to unlock new toys and activities, such as a flying disc tournament. Similarly, a wide variety of accessories can be unlocked for dressing up the pets and taking screenshots.

== Reception ==
Reception

Aggregate score
Aggregator	Score
Metacritic	53/100

Review scores
Publication	Score
Famitsu	29/40
Nintendo Life	5/10
Nintendo World Report	5/10

Little Friends received "mixed or average" reviews from critics according to Metacritic with a current Metascore of 53/100.

Nintendo Life gave Little Friends a 5/10, saying that the game "invites comparisons with the Nintendogs series with its structure and overall presentation." and concluded that "once you've enjoyed petting your fill of digital 'good bois', you'll be left marveling at how little there is to do even compared to that most lightweight (though fondly remembered) of Nintendo offerings." Nintendo World Report gave Little Friends a 5/10, praising the game for delivering "on its promises" and for having "many outfits to buy and customize", but criticized the game's "failure to do more to capture my attention". Switch Player gave Little Friends a 2.5/5, calling it a "shallow" experience, but said it could "work as an idle game if you're after this kind of experience."

Famitsu gave Little Friends a 29/40, with three of the reviewers giving a score of 7 and the fourth a score of 8.

By March 24, 2023, the game had sold over 650,000 copies worldwide.
