= Kiloblaster =

- Developer: Epic MegaGames
- Publisher: Epic MegaGames
- Composer: Dan Froelich
- Platform: MS-DOS
- Release: NA: 1992
- Genre: Fixed shooter
- Mode: Single-player

Kiloblaster is a fixed shooter video game trilogy written by Allen Pilgrim and published by Epic MegaGames in 1992 for IBM PC compatibles. Based on Namco's Galaxian from 1979, there are a few differences such as allowing greater player movement (horizontally and vertically), much faster enemy movement, power-ups, enemies that take more than one hit, and allies to assist in battle.

Allen Pilgrim declared the registered version freeware and released also the source code on August 4, 2008. Following that, ports with SDL to new platforms and mobile devices like the Pandora were created.

== Plot ==
In the first episode "Death of a Starship" the starship called Kiloprise was attacked by aliens and sent to the outer regions of space. The captain of the ship takes a powerful jet fighter to transport the remaining crew and fight his way through the galaxy to warn Earth of the coming rebel invasion.

In the second episode "No Way Out", the Kiloblaster is surrounded by the alien force but after finding their weak point, takes off for another battle.

In the final episode "The Final Battle", the alien force is crippled and is making a counterattack for Earth. The Captain makes all the speed possible fighting on the way for the final battle and alert Earth. In the end all the captain gets for a reward is a two-week holiday in Jamaica.

== Gameplay ==
Each episode consists of 30 levels. Almost every 3 levels have their background and music track. The player must use the Kiloblaster ship to eliminate all rebel ships in the levels otherwise survive the multiple waves of invading attack ships. Most enemies are destroyed in one shot, but some enemies require more shots to be destroyed. Enemy bullets or ramming into an enemy ship damages the Kiloblaster. The Kiloblaster is destroyed after five hits. Few enemies use killer laser shots instead of bullets. In some levels there are space mines which destroy the Kiloblaster on impact.

The Kiloblaster can collect certain items for aid. An apple restores a hit point, otherwise boosts the player's score if hit points are maxed out. A banana boosts the player's score. A strawberry temporarily summons two or four wingmen, miniature ships that fire the same projectiles as the player (except for smaller missiles) and are destroyed by a single enemy shot. A Can of Spinach grants the Kiloblaster a temporary invincibility shield. Only a space mine can destroy the shield. Power Rings randomly give the Kiloblaster Regular Missiles or the widespread Pink Panther Missile.

== Graphics ==
The game includes VGA graphics, but a 16-colour EGA mode is also selectable. Running in 256-colour mode places obviously computer-generated backgrounds behind the main game levels. The registered version also came with its own Board Editor to customise the backgrounds of the levels.

Allen Pilgrim implemented the backgrounds, which were based on images captured by the Voyager 1 and ray traced pictures by Samuel Goldstein.
