= Fitness Boxing =

2018 video game

- Home menu icon
- Developer: Imagineer
- Publishers: JP: Imagineer; WW: Nintendo
- Platform: Nintendo Switch
- Release: JP: December 20, 2018; PAL: December 21, 2018; NA: January 4, 2019
- Genres: Fitness, rhythm, sports
- Modes: Single-player, multiplayer

Fitness Boxing is a fitness video game developed and published by Imagineer for the Nintendo Switch. The game was released on December 20, 2018 in Japan by Imagineer, December 21, 2018 in PAL territories and January 4, 2019 in North America by Nintendo.

Fitness Boxing is the successor to the Shape Boxing trilogy released on the Wii, with the first two installments rebranded as licensed Gold's Gym fitness games in at least North America.

Two sequels, Fitness Boxing 2: Rhythm and Exercise and Fitness Boxing: Fist of the North Star, were released for the Nintendo Switch on December 4, 2020 and March 3, 2023, respectively; with Imagineer publishing the latter worldwide. The third one in the trilogy, Fitness Boxing feat. Hatsune Miku: Isshoni Exercise, was released on March 7, 2024 in Japan, followed by an English release on July 12 in Asia (simply as Fitness Boxing feat. Hatsune Miku) and an international release on September 5, 2024 by Aksys Games. The third sequel, Fitness Boxing 3: Your Personal Trainer, released worldwide on December 5, 2024. A Nintendo Switch 2 edition of the third numbered game released on July 16, 2026.

As announced on August 30, 2023, Fitness Boxing was delisted from digital retailers on November 30 in all regions, likely due to expired music licenses. Likewise, Fitness Boxing 2: Rhythm and Exercise was delisted digitally on November 23, 2025.

== Gameplay ==
The gameplay involves using the Joy-Con motion controllers to perform punches and dodging maneuvers. The workouts recommend a full body stretching exercise both at the start and end of the workouts. The difficulty and complexity of the workouts increase gradually over time. Free exercises are always available, regardless of if daily workout has been completed or not. The score for each exercise (excluding the stretches) is determined by how precise the player is in performing their punches and maneuvers.

The default coach is Lin, and there is a total of 5 other coaches (3 female and 2 male), each with customizable appearances. New costumes can be unlocked by performing achievements. The coaches demonstrate every maneuver involved in each exercise, making them a visual guide for maintaining rhythm. They also provide the players tips both during and outside of the exercises.

=== Playlist ===
Fitness Boxing contains a playlist of instrumental versions of popular pop songs that is played with each workout exercise.

The songs featured in the original Fitness Boxing are;

- "She Looks So Perfect" by 5 Seconds of Summer
- "Cartoon Heroes" by Aqua
- "Girlfriend" by Avril Lavigne
- "Video Killed the Radio Star" by The Buggles
- "Call Me Maybe" by Carly Rae Jepsen
- "Baby" by Justin Bieber ft. Ludacris
- "Stronger" by Kelly Clarkson
- "Bad Romance" by Lady Gaga
- "Born This Way" by Lady Gaga
- "Funkytown" by Lipps Inc.
- "Party Rock Anthem" by LMFAO
- "Moves Like Jagger" by Maroon 5 ft. Christina Aguilera
- "Sugar" by Maroon 5
- "All About That Bass" by Meghan Trainor
- "I'm In the Mood for Dancing" by The Nolans
- "Live While We're Young" by One Direction
- "Good Time" by Owl City & Carly Rae Jepsen
- "Timber" by Pitbull ft. Kesha
- "20th Century Boy" by T. Rex
- "Shut Up and Dance" by Walk the Moon

The songs featured in Fitness Boxing 2: Rhythm & Exercise are;

- "Break Free" by Ariana Grande ft. Zedd
- "Castle on the Hill" by Ed Sheeran
- "What Makes You Beautiful" by One Direction
- "Beauty and a Beat" by Justin Bieber ft. Nicki Minaj
- "Something Just Like This" by The Chainsmokers & Coldplay
- "Bang Bang" by Jessie J, Ariana Grande & Nicki Minaj
- "Birdsong" (original composition)
- "Animals" by Martin Garrix
- "Born to Be Wild" by Steppenwolf
- "So What" by P!nk
- "Sandstorm" by Darude
- "Venus" by Bananarama
- "Don't You Worry Child" by Swedish House Mafia ft. John Martin
- "Girls Just Want to Have Fun" by Cyndi Lauper
- "Alone" by Marshmello
- "It's My Life" by Bon Jovi
- "Boogie Wonderland" by Earth, Wind & Fire
- "Can't Hold Us" by Macklemore & Ryan Lewis
- "I'm an Albatraoz" by AronChupa
- "Hot n Cold" by Katy Perry
- "Y.M.C.A." by Village People
- "Aim High" (original composition)
- "South Nocturne" (original composition)

== Development ==
Fitness Boxing was first announced by Imagineer on June 14, 2018. It was developed by former Rocket Company members working for Imagineer.

In late-September 2018, Imagineer revealed the release date of Fitness Boxing for Japan and in early-October 2018, Nintendo revealed the release date of Fitness Boxing for North America and Europe as well as screenshots of gameplay.

In late-October 2018, Imagineer revealed the track listing for Fitness Boxing and uploaded the first gameplay video of Fitness Boxing to their YouTube channel.

== Release and promotion ==
On November 29, 2018, a Fitness Boxing demo was released on the European Nintendo eShop for the Switch and a demo was released on the North American eShop on December 13, 2018.

Fitness Boxing was released both digitally and physically on December 20, 2018, in Japan, December 21, 2018, in Europe and Australia and January 4, 2019, in North America.

On January 15, 2019, Nintendo held a promotional event for Fitness Boxing at Nintendo New York, which included a group of women led by Instagram fitness influencer Niki Klasnic playing the game.

== Related media ==
On August 26, 2021, an anime television series adaptation produced by Imagineer and Story Effect was announced. This anime series is directed and written by Junpei Morita, with motion capture by SOLID CUBE and music composed by Yūsuke Shirato. It premiered on October 1, 2021, on Tokyo MX.

== Reception ==
Reception

Aggregate score
Aggregator	Score
Metacritic	66/100

Review scores
Publication	Score
Destructoid	7/10
Nintendo Life	8/10
Nintendo World Report	7.5/10

Fitness Boxing received "mixed or average" reviews from critics according to Metacritic with a score of 66 out of 100, based on reviews from 14 critics.

Nintendo Life gave Fitness Boxing a 8/10; calling it "no substitute for hard hours at the gym", but still recommended the game as a workout regimen for being energetic, entertaining, and cheaper than a gym membership. Nintendo World Report gave Fitness Boxing a 7.5/10; praising it for having multiple exercises for various skill levels, but criticized the limited number of musical tracks.

Destructoid gave Fitness Boxing a 7/10, saying that "There could be some hard-to-ignore faults, but the experience is fun."

The Reno Gazette-Journal gave Fitness Boxing a 6 out of 10, saying that "Fitness Boxing works great as a fitness app but not so much as a game."

=== Sales ===
From January 7, 2019, to January 13, Fitness Boxing placed 20th on Japanese sales charts, selling 3,024 physical copies during that period.

In February 2019, Fitness Boxing started experiencing shortages in Japan.

In September 2020, Imagineer announced that the game had sold over 1 million copies worldwide.
