= Kobyashi Naru =

1987 video game

- DOS cover art
- Publisher: Mastertronic
- Platforms: Commodore 64, Amstrad CPC, ZX Spectrum, IBM PC
- Release: 1987
- Genre: Adventure
- Mode: Single-player

Kobyashi Naru is a 1987 adventure game by Mastertronic. The title comes from the Kobayashi Maru scenario in the Star Trek fictional universe, a training test. The player attempts to complete a series of challenges in order to complete the Kobyashi Naru test. Gameplay is standard for text-based adventures of the era. ZZap!64 summed it up as "harmless claptrap", while CVG Magazine commented on the "extremeley basic" graphics. Computer Gamer praised the intuitiveness of the game's parser, as opposed to other games that require a persnickety combination of words.
