= High Brows =

Book by Bruce Marshall

High Brows: An Extravaganza of Manners – Mostly Bad
- Author: Bruce Marshall
- Language: English
- Publisher: Jarrolds
- Publication date: 1929

High Brows: An Extravaganza of Manners – Mostly Bad is a 1929 novel by Scottish writer Bruce Marshall, published by Jarrolds.

== Reception ==
In a glowing review The Aberdeen Press and Journal stated, "One thinks of this novel of contemporary life in adjectives, a whole string of them. Clever, acute, amusing, scathing, cynical—immoral if you like, but immoral with the purpose of an artistic morality. ... The dialogue is sparkling, unusually witty, and always rich in unexpectedness." Writing for The Daily News, Evelyn Underhill found High Brows to "pain[t] a light-hearted caricature of contemporary society".

J. A. T. Lloyd of The Daily Telegraph said, "The author is frequently handicapped by the process of applying satire to what is already caricature. Still, High Brows certainly contains excellent specimens of prize idiots in notoriety." The Bystander's Ralph Straus praised the novel for being a "quite unusually diverting—a wickedly satirical commentary on affairs as they are, or, rather, as certain of the newspapers would have us believe they are, today". The Liverpool Daily Post said, "we are able to enjoy a book that should have, to alter another now well-known phrase, a tendency to shock those whose minds are open to such shocking influences".
