= Kickoff '97 =

1997 sports video game

- Developer: Anco Software
- Publisher: Maxis
- Platforms: MS-DOS, Windows
- Release: June 11, 1997
- Genre: Sports
- Modes: Single-player, multiplayer

Kickoff '97 is an association football video game developed by Anco and published by Maxis in 1997 for MS-DOS and Windows.

== Gameplay ==
Kickoff '97 is a soccer game that uses one button for shooting and one button for passing, which can be combined for various actions.

== Reception ==
Reception

Review scores
Publication	Score
Computer Gaming World	4/5
GameSpot	6.9/10
Next Generation	4/5
PC Joker	66%
PC Player	4/5
Power Play	43%

Next Generation gave four stars out of five and called it "one of the most enjoyable soccer titles" for IBM PC compatibles. Chris Macholtz for the Arizona Daily Star called the game "no timeless classic, but it does stand on its own merits as being a game with absolutely no learning curve or complexity to it".
