= Kick Off (series) =

- Amstrad CPC cover art
- Developer: Dino Dini
- Publishers: Anco Software; Imagineer
- Platforms: Amstrad CPC, Atari ST, Amiga, Commodore 64, MS-DOS, ZX Spectrum, NES, PlayStation
- Release: 1989
- Genre: Sports
- Modes: Single-player, multiplayer

The Kick Off franchise is a series of football simulation video games created by Dino Dini. Kick Off was published by Anil Gupta's publishing house Anco Software for the Atari ST and Commodore Amiga. First released in 1989, Kick Off was well-received and won awards.

After the release of Kick Off several sequels were released. Player Manager was released in 1990. The game was the first game to combine a management environment (including tactics, league play, transfers, and detailed player attributes) with a football game engine (based on that of Kick Off). Kick Off 2 was released in 1990 as a sequel to Kick Off. The game introduced a number of new features as well as several small alterations.

In 1992, Dino Dini left Anco and signed a contract for Virgin Games, which released Goal! in 1993. Anco released several further editions of the Kick Off series between 1994 and 1997, but these games had little in common with Kick Off and Kick Off 2. In 2001–2003, the KOA collaborated closely with Anco developer Steve Screech in an attempt to relaunch the Kick Off and Player Manager series. Kick Off 2002 was released. Anco started to work on another sequel Kick Off 2004 which reached beta status. The attempt came to a halt when Anco closed in 2003.

== History ==
Kick Off was released in 1989. Kick Off was first developed for the Atari ST and then ported to the Amiga. Several expansion disks were released for Kick Off 2. In 1992, Dino Dini left Anco and signed a contract for Virgin Games, which released Goal! in 1993. Anco released Kick Off 3 in 1994. The game used a side view instead of a top-down view and bore little resemblance to Kick Off 2 apart from the name. Anco Software published the first versions of Kick Off for the Amiga and Atari ST.

== Gameplay ==
Atari ST gameplay of Kick Off

With Kick Off the ball did not stick to the player's feet but instead was realistically kicked ahead from the players. This added a degree of difficulty and skill requirement at the same time. Other attributes, such as action replays, players with different characteristics, different tactics, fouls, yellow cards, red cards, injuries, injury time and various referees with different moods are also featured.

== Reception ==
- ST Action – Highest accolade they could give.
- Amiga User Int – "Best computer game ever" 97%
- The One – "Ultimate soccer simulation" 96%
- ACE – "Brilliant, BUY BUY BUY" 92%
- Amiga Format – "Best footy game to have appeared on any machine" 94%
- ST Format – "What a game! gem to play. Magic" 90%
- C&VG - "Championship winning material" 95%
- The Games Machine – "Probably the best sports game ever" 92%
- Commodore User – "No other footy game can touch it" 90%
- Amiga Action – "Surpasses all other football games" 93%
- PCW - "Nothing short of brilliant"
- New Comp Express – "Computer football event of the year"
- Zzap!64 – "So realistic, so fun, and soooo addictive" 96%

Conversely, the journalist Stuart Campbell of Amiga Power disliked the series, particularly Kick Off 2, finding the controls unmasterable and illogical.

=== Awards ===
- Awarded UK: 1989 INDIN Best 16 Bit Product
- Nominated UK: 1989 INDIN Best Programmer (2nd place, the winner was "Bullfrog" for Populous)
- Awarded 1989 EMAP Images Golden Joystick Award Best 16 Bit Product (EMAP is a major UK magazine publisher)
- Voted the 7th best game of all time in Amiga Power in 1991.

== Sequels ==
=== Kick Off 2 ===
In 1990, Kick Off 2 was released by Anco. Kick Off 2 retains the pace and accuracy of Kick Off, with a full size multi directional scrolling pitch and the players, markings, goals etc., in correct proportions. Both teams play the game strictly according to tactics. Players move into position to receive passes and gain possession. The ball, as in real game, travels ahead of the player.

There is a league and a cup tournament with sudden death penalty shoot outs, in case of a draw. The teams in the league are on the whole evenly matched but with different styles of play and the player skills to match, that style. There is an option to load player's team from Player Manager along with player's tactics, to play against another team in a single game or enter league and cup tournament.

The special events selection in the main menu allows data disks to be loaded. Kick Off 2 also provides the facility to change strip colours and on expanded Atari ST's (1 MB or above) there are additional sound effects. The "Action Replay" facility allows goals to be viewed at normal pace or in "Slow Motion" and saved to disk. There are 24 referees and have their own distinctive temperaments.

=== Super Kick Off ===
Super Kick Off is one of the follow-ups of Kick Off and Kick Off 2 for the Master System, Game Boy, Mega Drive, and Super Nintendo Entertainment System. Super Kick Off was slower than the original games. The Mega Drive version knocked PGA Tour Golf II from the top of the charts. MegaTech gave the game 94% and a Hyper Game Award, saying that the "feel and playability is unrivalled by any other footy game so far", but criticising the high price of £45.

The Mega Drive version received mixed-to-positive reviews from European publications. In the United Kingdom, Computer and Video Games awarded Super Kick Off 91%, praising its gameplay, range of modes and improvements over previous versions of Kick Off, while giving particularly high marks for gameplay and value.

French magazine Joypad gave the game 78%. Although praising its animation, numerous options and longevity, the magazine was much more critical of the controls, considering the handling unnecessarily difficult and requiring considerable practice. German magazine Video Games was similarly critical, awarding it 68%. The review highlighted its extensive selection of competitions, teams and tactical settings, but found the controls difficult to master and the on-field action comparatively cumbersome.

Italian magazine Game Power highlighted the series' established popularity and emphasized the Mega Drive version's speed and ball physics, describing control of the ball's movement and spin as central to the game's style. In Spain, Todo Sega awarded the game 90%, praising its large number of options, game modes and addictive play, while noting that its controls initially required considerable practice and that its graphics were comparatively unremarkable.

=== Goal! ===
In 1992, a sequel, Kick Off 3, was in development. The game wasn't released in this form though, as Dino Dini left Anco in 1992 for Virgin Games, where he developed Goal!, released in 1993. Goal! featured similar gameplay to Kick Off 2 but also added one-touch passing as seen in Sensible Soccer, player acceleration, and more advanced menu systems and options. Goal! received generally good reviews but did not enjoy the same lasting popularity as Kick Off 2.

=== Kick Off 3 ===
In 1994, Anco released Kick Off 3 developed by Steve Screech, a totally new game with nothing in common with Kick Off 2. The game did not receive as good reviews as its predecessors and did not gain the same popularity. An Atari Jaguar port was in development but never released.

==== Kick Off 96, 97 & 98 ====
In 1996, Toka Nono released Kick Off 96 for Amiga and Windows. The game received average reviews. In 1997, Kick Off 97 was released for Windows. The game received better reviews than Kick Off 96 but still did not become popular. Later the same year, Anco released Kick Off 98 for the PC which received poor reviews. In 1998 Kick Off World was released for the original PlayStation, again developed by Toka and published by Funsoft.

=== Kick Off 2002 ===
In 2001, Steve Screech started a project called Ultimate Kick Off with the help of an early established Kick Off Association. The game was built using the Gamebryo engine, released by Anco in 2002 for PC and Mac with the name Kick Off 2002. The game received poor reviews and only sold 5000 copies, despite being published by Acclaim and a 15€ pricetag. Later a sequel called Kick Off 2004 was planned. It reached beta status but was never released. The project ended when Anco closed in 2003.

=== Kick Off Revival ===
A new entry in the series, with a control system designed for the use with an analog stick, Kick Off Revival, was released in June 2016 for PlayStation 4 with poor reviews from the main game websites. PlayStation Vita version was released nine months later in 2017 with bad reviews. A PC version is available on Steam.

=== Kick Off Online ===
Kick Off 2 Online(KOOL) is an online soccer game based on the second game in the series for Windows. Kick Off 2 Online is written by Steve Camber with permission from Dino Dini.

== Games in the series ==
The Kick Off series includes the following games:

Games by Dino Dini:

- Kick Off (1989)
- Kick Off 2 (1990)
- Kick Off 2 1MB (1990)
- Kick Off Revival (2016)

Games by Steve Screech:

- Kickoff '97 (1997)
- Kick Off 3 (1994)
- Kick Off 2002 (2002)

Expansion disks:

- Kick Off Extra Time (Data disk) (1989)
- Kick Off 2: Giants of Europe (Data disk) (1990)
- Kick Off 2: The Final Whistle (Expansion disk) (1991)
- Kick Off 2: Return To Europe (Expansion disk) (1991)
- Kick Off 2: Winning Tactics (Data disk) (1991)
- Kick Off 2: Super League (Expansion disk) (1991) Games by others:
  - Franco Baresi World Cup Kick Off (1990)
  - Player Manager (1990)
  - Kick Off 2 World Cup 90 (1990)
  - Kick Off 2: Maths Disk (Expansion disk) (1991)
  - Super Kick-Off (1991)
  - Kick Off 98 (1997)

== Ports ==
- World League Soccer (Super NES)
