= Content industry =

The content industry is an umbrella term that encompasses companies owning and providing mass media and media metadata. This can include music, TV shows, movies, text publications of any kind, ownership of standards, geographic data, and metadata about all and any of the above.

In the Information Age, the content industry comprises an enormous market.

== Terminology ==
Content creation is the act of producing (and sharing) information or media content for specific audiences, particularly in digital contexts. A content creator is the person behind such works. According to Dictionary.com, content refers to "something that is to be expressed through some medium, as speech, writing or any of various arts" for self-expression, distribution, marketing and/or publication. Content creation encompasses various activities, including maintaining and updating web sites, blogging, article writing, photography, videography, online commentary, social media accounts, and editing and distribution of digital media. In a survey conducted by the Pew Research Center, the content thus created was defined as "the material people contribute to the online world". In addition to traditional forms of content creation, digital platforms face growing challenges related to privacy, copyright, misinformation, platform moderation policies, and the repercussions of violating community guidelines.

== See also ==
- Information industry
- Information technology
