= Dino Dini =

Computer game developer (born 1965)

Dino Dini (born 5 June 1965) is an Italian-British video game developer and creator of the Kick Off series of football games. He was a lecturer at the Breda University of Applied Sciences in the Netherlands, teaching game programming.

== Career ==
In 1989 Dini's football game Kick Off was published by Anil Gupta's publishing house Anco Software, for the Atari ST & Amiga to critical acclaim and high sales. Dini followed it with Player Manager and Kick Off 2. Goal! (also known as Dino Dini's Soccer) was then released after Dini left Anco and moved to Virgin Games in 1993. Goal! was critically acclaimed worldwide. Goal! introduced more user friendly controls compared to Kick Off 2 and entertained a wider audience than its predecessor. In 1996, Dini moved to the United States to work as project director for the Z-Axis football game Three Lions, released in 1998.

In 2001, Dini moved back to Great Britain and started to work with his new development company, Abundant Software. In 2004, Dini signed with DC Studios to develop a new soccer game which was code-named Soccer 3 and later Total Control Football. The game was cancelled during the summer of 2005.

After 2005, Dini worked as a contractor on a government-funded project. In 2009, he became a lecturer for the International Game Architecture and Design programme at Breda University of Applied Sciences in the Netherlands, teaching game programming. At the 2009 Game Developers Conference Europe (GDCE) in Cologne, Germany, Dini was guest speaker on the subject of video game design.

In 2010, Dino ran unsuccessfully for a position on the International Game Developers Association board of directors. In August of that year, he announced via his blog that he was working on a sequel to his game Player Manager as an independent project. In 2011 he contributed articles and the beta version of his browser-based game Letteroids 3D to DevilsMMO, a website for MMO and MMORPG games.

A new game of Kick Off series, titled Dino Dini's Kick Off Revival, was released on the PlayStation 4 in June 2016, with poor reviews from game journalists, and from players. Metacritic judged Kick Off Revival the 2nd worst game of 2016. Vice elected Revival as the worst football game ever made. A PlayStation Vita version was delayed and released nine months later in March 2017 with bad reviews.

The PC version, released on Steam in September 2017, was an exact port of the PlayStation 4 version. Kick Off games.

== Games ==
Games developed by Dini include:

- Kick Off (published by Anco, 1989): Amiga, Atari ST
- Player Manager (Anco, 1990): Amiga, Atari ST
- Kick Off 2 (Anco, 1990): Amiga, Atari ST
- GOAL! (Virgin Games, 1993): Amiga, Atari ST, PC
- Dino Dini's Soccer (Virgin Games, 1994): Mega Drive, Super NES
