= List of Xbox games =

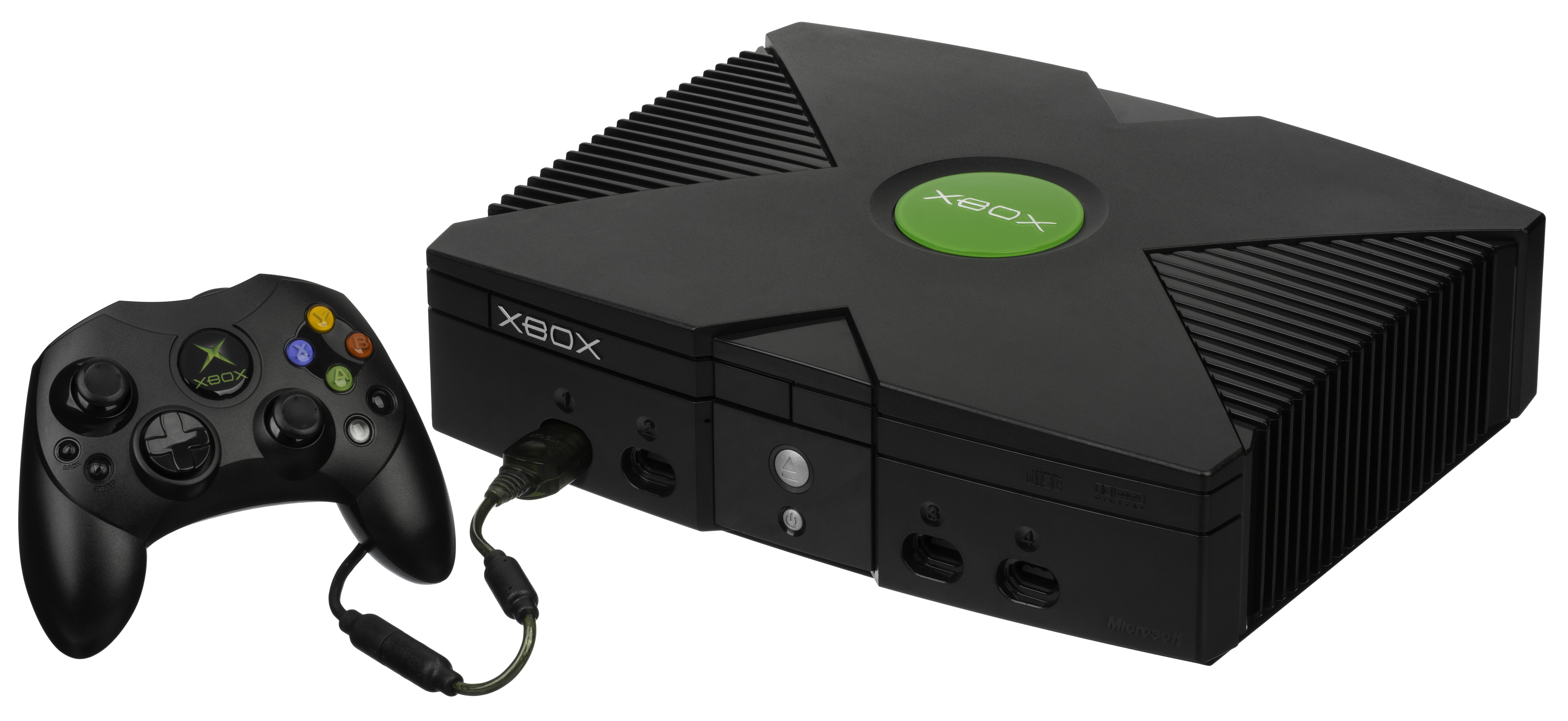
The Xbox

Official Xbox Banner used on games exclusive to Xbox

The Xbox is Microsoft's first home video game console, released during the sixth generation of video games. There are a total of 989 (Note: This number is always up to date by this script.) titles on this list. This list does not include Xbox Live Arcade games, demos, or bonus discs. For games that were announced or revealed to be in development for the original Xbox, but never released, see the list of cancelled Xbox games.

For a chronological list, click the sort button in any of the available region's column.The Xbox launched in North America on November 15, 2001.

== Games ==
games
Title	Developer(s)	Publisher(s)	Release date		
Title	Developer(s)	Publisher(s)	PAL	JP	NA
187 Ride or Die	Ubisoft Paris	Ubisoft	Aug 25, 2005^{AUS} Aug 26, 2005^{EU}	Unreleased	Aug 23, 2005
2002 FIFA World Cup	EA Canada; Creations; Intelligent Games	EA Sports^{WW} Electronic Arts Square^{JP}	Apr 26, 2002	May 2, 2002	Apr 22, 2002
2006 FIFA World Cup	EA Canada	EA Sports	Apr 28, 2006	Unreleased	Apr 24, 2006
25 to Life	Avalanche Software; Ritual Entertainment	Eidos Interactive	Unreleased	Unreleased	Jan 18, 2006
4x4 Evo 2	Terminal Reality	Gathering of Developers	Jun 5, 2002	Unreleased	Nov 15, 2001
50 Cent: Bulletproof	Genuine Games	Vivendi Universal Games	Nov 25, 2005	Unreleased	Nov 17, 2005
Advent Rising	GlyphX Games	Majesco	Feb 17, 2006	Unreleased	May 31, 2005
Æon Flux	Terminal Reality	Majesco	Mar 30, 2006^{AUS} Mar 31, 2006^{EU}	Unreleased	Nov 15, 2005
AFL Live 2003	IR Gurus	Acclaim Sports	Sep 5, 2002^{AUS}	Unreleased	Unreleased
AFL Live 2004	IR Gurus	Acclaim Entertainment	Aug 28, 2003^{AUS}	Unreleased	Unreleased
AFL Live: Premiership Edition	IR Gurus	Acclaim Entertainment; THQ	Apr 29, 2004^{AUS}	Unreleased	Unreleased
AFL Premiership	IR Gurus	THQ	Sep 22, 2005^{AUS}	Unreleased	Unreleased
Aggressive Inline	Z-Axis	AKA Acclaim	Aug 23, 2002	Unreleased	Aug 1, 2002
AirForce Delta Storm Deadly Skies (PAL) Airforce Delta II (JP)	Konami Computer Entertainment Studios	Konami	Apr 12, 2002	Feb 22, 2002	Nov 15, 2001
Alias	Acclaim Studios Cheltenham	Acclaim Entertainment	Apr 8, 2004	Unreleased	Apr 6, 2004
Alien Hominid	The Behemoth	Zoo Digital Publishing	May 27, 2005^{EU} Jun 23, 2005^{AUS}	Unreleased	Unreleased
Aliens Versus Predator: Extinction	Zono	Electronic Arts	Aug 1, 2003^{AUS} Aug 8, 2003^{EU}	Unreleased	Aug 5, 2003
All-Star Baseball 2003	Acclaim Studios Austin	Acclaim Sports	May 31, 2002	Aug 8, 2002	Mar 7, 2002
All-Star Baseball 2004	Acclaim Studios Austin	Acclaim Sports	Unreleased	Unreleased	Feb 28, 2003
All-Star Baseball 2005	Acclaim Studios Austin	Acclaim Entertainment	Unreleased	Unreleased	Mar 23, 2004
Alter Echo	Outrage Games	THQ	Sep 12, 2003^{AUS} Oct 3, 2003^{EU}	Unreleased	Aug 18, 2003
America's Army: Rise of a Soldier	Secret Level, Inc.	Ubisoft	Feb 24, 2006	Unreleased	Nov 15, 2005
American Chopper	Creat Studios	Activision	Nov 23, 2004	Unreleased	Nov 23, 2004
American Chopper 2: Full Throttle	Creat Studios	Activision	Nov 16, 2005	Unreleased	Nov 16, 2005
AMF Bowling 2004	Black Market Games	Mud Duck Productions	Unreleased	Unreleased	Dec 1, 2003
AMF Xtreme Bowling	Atomic Planet Entertainment	Mud Duck Productions	Unreleased	Unreleased	Jun 28, 2006
Amped: Freestyle Snowboarding	Indie Built	Microsoft Game Studios	Mar 14, 2002	Feb 22, 2002	Nov 20, 2001
Amped 2	Indie Built	Microsoft Game Studios	Nov 14, 2003	Feb 26, 2004	Oct 28, 2003
AND 1 Streetball	Black Ops Entertainment	Ubisoft	Aug 31, 2006^{AUS} Sep 1, 2006^{EU}	Unreleased	Jun 6, 2006
Angelic Concert	Success	Success	Unreleased	Mar 13, 2003	Unreleased
Animaniacs: The Great Edgar Hunt	Warthog Games	Ignition Entertainment	Oct 14, 2005	Unreleased	Unreleased
Antz Extreme Racing	Supersonic Software	Empire Interactive	Jul 26, 2002	Unreleased	Sep 5, 2002
Aoi Namida	Artlim Media	Panther Software	Unreleased	May 27, 2004	Unreleased
APEX Racing Evoluzione (PAL)	Milestone	Infogrames	Feb 28, 2003	Unreleased	Feb 18, 2003
Aquaman: Battle for Atlantis	Lucky Chicken Games	TDK Mediactive	Unreleased	Unreleased	Jul 30, 2003
Arctic Thunder	Inland Productions	Midway	Mar 22, 2002	Unreleased	Nov 15, 2001
Area 51	Midway Studios Austin	Midway	May 26, 2005^{AUS} May 27, 2005^{EU}	Unreleased	Apr 25, 2005
Arena Football	EA Tiburon	EA Sports	Unreleased	Unreleased	Feb 7, 2006
Armed and Dangerous	Planet Moon Studios	LucasArts	Feb 27, 2004	Unreleased	Dec 2, 2003
Army Men: Major Malfunction	Team17	Global Star Software	Aug 4, 2006	Unreleased	Apr 11, 2006
Army Men: Sarge's War	Tactical Development	Global Star Software	Jul 23, 2004	Unreleased	Aug 2, 2004
Arx Fatalis	Wizarbox	DreamCatcher Interactive^{NA} Mindscape^{PAL}	Dec 12, 2003^{GER} Feb 13, 2004^{UK}	Unreleased	Dec 22, 2003
Atari Anthology	Digital Eclipse	Atari, Inc.	Nov 26, 2004^{EU} Dec 3, 2004^{AUS}	Aug 4, 2005	Nov 16, 2004
ATV: Quad Power Racing 2	Climax Brighton	AKA Acclaim	Feb 28, 2003	Unreleased	Jan 22, 2003
Auto Modellista	Capcom Production Studio 1	Capcom	Unreleased	Jan 29, 2004	Jan 20, 2004
Avatar: The Last Airbender	THQ Studio Australia	THQ	Unreleased	Unreleased	Oct 10, 2006
Azurik: Rise of Perathia	Adrenium Games	Microsoft Game Studios	May 17, 2002	Unreleased	Nov 27, 2001
Backyard Wrestling: Don't Try This at Home	Paradox Development	Eidos Interactive	Nov 7, 2003	Unreleased	Oct 9, 2003
Backyard Wrestling 2: There Goes the Neighborhood	Paradox Development	Eidos Interactive	Nov 19, 2004^{EU} Dec 3, 2004^{AUS}	Unreleased	Nov 16, 2004
Bad Boys: Miami Takedown Bad Boys II (PAL)	Blitz Games	Empire Interactive^{PAL} Crave Entertainment^{NA}	Feb 27, 2004	Unreleased	Sep 21, 2004
Baldur's Gate: Dark Alliance	Snowblind Studios	Interplay Entertainment	Mar 21, 2003	Unreleased	Oct 22, 2002
Baldur's Gate: Dark Alliance II	Black Isle Studios	Interplay Entertainment	Feb 6, 2004	Unreleased	Jan 20, 2004
Barbarian	Saffire	Titus Interactive	Dec 12, 2003	Unreleased	Unreleased
Barbie Horse Adventures: Wild Horse Rescue	Blitz Games	Vivendi Universal Games	Feb 13, 2004	Unreleased	Nov 4, 2003
The Bard's Tale	InXile Entertainment	InXile Entertainment	Mar 24, 2005	Unreleased	Oct 26, 2004
The Baseball 2002: Battle Ball Park Sengen	Konami	Konami	Unreleased	Jul 11, 2002	Unreleased
Bass Pro Shops: Trophy Bass 2007	Big John Games	Vivendi Universal Games	Unreleased	Unreleased	Nov 20, 2006
Bass Pro Shops Trophy Hunter 2007	Jarhead Games	Vivendi Universal Games	Unreleased	Unreleased	Nov 20, 2006
Batman Begins	Eurocom	EA Games; Warner Bros. Interactive Entertainment	Jun 17, 2005^{EU} Jun 27, 2005^{AUS}	Unreleased	Jun 15, 2005
Batman: Dark Tomorrow	HotGen	Kemco	Apr 11, 2003	Mar 21, 2003	Mar 18, 2003
Batman: Rise of Sin Tzu	Ubi Soft Montreal	Ubi Soft	Nov 14, 2003	Unreleased	Oct 16, 2003
Batman: Vengeance	Ubi Soft Montreal	Ubi Soft	Mar 14, 2002	Unreleased	Dec 18, 2001
Battle Engine Aquila	Lost Toys	Infogrames	Feb 28, 2003	Unreleased	Jan 27, 2003
Battlefield 2: Modern Combat	DICE	Electronic Arts	Nov 18, 2005	Unreleased	Oct 25, 2005
Battlestar Galactica	Warthog Games	Universal Interactive	Dec 5, 2003	Unreleased	Nov 18, 2003
Beat Down: Fists of Vengeance	Cavia	Capcom	Sep 30, 2005	Nov 2, 2005	Aug 23, 2005
Beyond Good & Evil	Ubisoft Pictures; Ubisoft Milan	Ubisoft	Feb 27, 2004	Unreleased	Dec 2, 2003
The Bible Game	Mass Media	Crave Entertainment	Unreleased	Unreleased	Oct 18, 2005
Bicycle Casino	Leaping Lizard Software	Activision Value	Mar 24, 2005	Unreleased	Oct 26, 2004
Big Bumpin'	Blitz Games	King Games	Unreleased	Unreleased	Nov 19, 2006
Big Mutha Truckers	Eutechnyx	Empire Interactive^{PAL} THQ^{NA}	Dec 6, 2002	Unreleased	Jun 23, 2003
Big Mutha Truckers 2	Eutechnyx	Empire Interactive^{PAL} THQ^{NA}	Jun 24, 2005	Unreleased	Aug 23, 2005
Bionicle	Argonaut Games; Argonaut Sheffield	Electronic Arts; Lego Interactive	Oct 17, 2003	Unreleased	Oct 20, 2003
Bistro Cupid	Success	Success	Unreleased	Jun 13, 2002	Unreleased
Bistro Cupid 2	Success	Success	Unreleased	Aug 28, 2003	Unreleased
Black	Criterion Games	Electronic Arts	Feb 24, 2006	Unreleased	Feb 28, 2006
Black Stone: Magic & Steel Ex-Chaser (JP)	XPEC Entertainment	Xicat Interactive^{WW} Idea Factory^{JP}	Mar 21, 2003	May 22, 2003	Mar 13, 2003
Blade II	Mucky Foot Productions	Activision	Sep 27, 2002	Unreleased	Sep 3, 2002
Blazing Angels: Squadrons of WWII	Ubisoft Bucharest	Ubisoft	Mar 30, 2006^{AUS} Mar 31, 2006^{EU}	Unreleased	Mar 23, 2006
Blinx: The Time Sweeper	Artoon	Microsoft Game Studios	Oct 16, 2002^{AUS} Nov 8, 2002^{EU}	Dec 12, 2002	Oct 8, 2002
Blinx 2: Masters of Time and Space	Artoon	Microsoft Game Studios	Dec 3, 2004	Nov 18, 2004	Nov 16, 2004
Blitz: The League	Midway Games	Midway	Unreleased	Unreleased	Oct 17, 2005
Blood Omen 2	Nixxes Software	Eidos Interactive	Mar 28, 2002	Unreleased	Mar 20, 2002
BloodRayne	Terminal Reality	Majesco^{NA} Vivendi Universal Games^{PAL}	May 2, 2003	Unreleased	Oct 31, 2002
BloodRayne 2	Terminal Reality	Majesco	Feb 17, 2006	Unreleased	Oct 12, 2004
Blood Wake	Stormfront Studios	Microsoft Game Studios	Mar 14, 2002	Unreleased	Dec 28, 2001
Bloody Roar Extreme	Konami Software Shanghai	Hudson Soft	Jul 17, 2003	Nov 28, 2003	May 27, 2003
BlowOut	Terminal Reality	Majesco	Nov 26, 2004	Unreleased	Nov 5, 2003
BMX XXX	Z-Axis	AKA Acclaim	Dec 6, 2002	Unreleased	Nov 15, 2002
Braveknight	Panther Software	Panther Software	Unreleased	Sep 26, 2002	Unreleased
Break Nine: World Billiards Tournament	ASK	ASK	Unreleased	Jul 25, 2002	Unreleased
Breakdown	Namco	Namco	Jun 18, 2004	Jan 29, 2004	Mar 16, 2004
Breeders' Cup World Thoroughbred Championships	4J Studios	Bethesda Softworks	Unreleased	Unreleased	Sep 21, 2005
Brian Lara International Cricket 2005 Ricky Ponting International Cricket 2005 (AUS)	Swordfish Studios	Codemasters	Jul 21, 2005^{EU} Sep 29, 2005^{AUS}	Unreleased	Unreleased
Broken Sword: The Sleeping Dragon	Revolution Software	THQ^{PAL} The Adventure Company^{NA}	Nov 14, 2003	Unreleased	Dec 8, 2003
Brothers in Arms: Earned in Blood	Gearbox Software	Ubisoft	Oct 6, 2005^{AUS} Oct 7, 2005^{EU}	Unreleased	Oct 6, 2005
Brothers in Arms: Road to Hill 30	Gearbox Software	Ubisoft	Mar 18, 2005	Sep 15, 2005	Mar 1, 2005
Bruce Lee: Quest of the Dragon	Ronin Entertainment	Universal Interactive	Sep 6, 2002	Unreleased	Jul 2, 2002
Brute Force	Digital Anvil	Microsoft Game Studios	Jun 5, 2003^{AUS} Jun 20, 2003^{EU}	Oct 9, 2003	May 27, 2003
Buffy the Vampire Slayer	The Collective	Electronic Arts	Sep 13, 2002	Unreleased	Aug 19, 2002
Buffy the Vampire Slayer: Chaos Bleeds	Eurocom	Vivendi Universal Games	Oct 24, 2003^{EU} Oct 29, 2003^{AUS}	Dec 25, 2003	August 26, 2003
Burnout	Criterion Games	Acclaim Entertainment	May 3, 2002	Unreleased	Apr 30, 2002
Burnout 2: Point of Impact	Criterion Games	Acclaim Entertainment	May 9, 2003^{EU} May 15, 2003^{AUS}	Unreleased	May 1, 2003
Burnout 3: Takedown	Criterion Games	EA Games	Sep 9, 2004^{AUS} Sep 10, 2004^{EU}	Unreleased	Sep 8, 2004
Burnout Revenge	Criterion Games	Electronic Arts	Sep 23, 2005^{EU} Sep 26, 2005^{AUS}	Unreleased	Sep 13, 2005
C.A.T.: Cyber Attack Team	Hyde; Medix	Medix	Unreleased	Jun 26, 2003	Unreleased
Cabela's Big Game Hunter 2005 Adventures	Fun Labs	Activision	Oct 14, 2005	Unreleased	Nov 23, 2004
Cabela's Dangerous Hunts	Fun Labs	Activision	Oct 1, 2004	Unreleased	Nov 11, 2003
Cabela's Dangerous Hunts 2	Fun Labs	Activision	Mar 1, 2006	Unreleased	Nov 15, 2005
Cabela's Deer Hunt: 2004 Season	Fun Labs	Activision	Unreleased	Unreleased	Aug 26, 2003
Cabela's Deer Hunt: 2005 Season	Fun Labs	Activision	Feb 2, 2005	Unreleased	Aug 31, 2004
Cabela's Outdoor Adventures	Fun Labs	Activision	Mar 17, 2006	Unreleased	Sep 14, 2005
Call of Cthulhu: Dark Corners of the Earth	Headfirst Productions	2K Games	Oct 28, 2005	Unreleased	Oct 24, 2005
Call of Duty: Finest Hour	Spark Unlimited; Kuju Entertainment	Activision	Nov 25, 2004^{AUS} Dec 3, 2004^{EU}	Oct 27, 2005	Nov 16, 2004
Call of Duty 2: Big Red One	Treyarch	Activision	Nov 18, 2005	Unreleased	Nov 1, 2005
Call of Duty 3	Treyarch	Activision	Nov 10, 2006^{EU} Nov 22, 2006^{AUS}	Unreleased	Nov 7, 2006
Capcom Classics Collection Vol. 1	Backbone Entertainment	Capcom	Nov 18, 2005	Unreleased	Sep 27, 2005
Capcom Classics Collection Vol. 2	Backbone Entertainment	Capcom	Unreleased	Unreleased	Nov 14, 2006
Capcom Fighting Evolution Capcom Fighting Jam (JP/PAL)	Capcom Production Studio 2	Capcom	Jun 24, 2005	Jun 16, 2005	Jun 14, 2005
Capcom vs. SNK 2 EO	Capcom	Capcom	Mar 7, 2003	Jan 16, 2003	Feb 11, 2003
Carmen Sandiego: The Secret of the Stolen Drums	Artificial Mind and Movement	BAM! Entertainment	Mar 5, 2004	Unreleased	Sep 13, 2004
Cars	Rainbow Studios	THQ	Jun 8, 2006^{AUS} Jul 14, 2006^{EU}	Unreleased	Jun 6, 2006
Carve	Argonaut Games	Global Star Software	Mar 19, 2004	Unreleased	Feb 24, 2004
Castlevania: Curse of Darkness	Konami	Konami	Feb 17, 2006	Unreleased	Nov 1, 2005
The Cat in the Hat	Magenta Software	Vivendi Universal Games	Mar 19, 2004	Mar 25, 2004	Nov 4, 2003
Catwoman	Argonaut Games; EA UK	EA Games	Jul 30, 2004^{AUS} Aug 6, 2004^{EU}	Unreleased	Jul 23, 2004
Cel Damage	Pseudo Interactive	EA Games	May 3, 2002	Unreleased	Nov 15, 2001
Celebrity Deathmatch	Big Ape Productions	Gotham Games	Oct 31, 2003	Unreleased	Oct 15, 2003
Championship Bowling	Black Market Games	Evolved Games	Unreleased	Unreleased	Mar 1, 2006
Championship Manager: Season 01/02	Sports Interactive	Eidos Interactive	Apr 14, 2002	Unreleased	Unreleased
Championship Manager: Season 02/03	Sports Interactive	Eidos Interactive	Nov 29, 2002	Unreleased	Unreleased
Championship Manager 2006	Gusto Games	Eidos Interactive	May 12, 2006	Unreleased	Unreleased
Championship Manager 5	Gusto Games	Eidos Interactive	May 13, 2005	Unreleased	Unreleased
Charlie and the Chocolate Factory	High Voltage Software	Global Star Software	Jul 22, 2005^{EU} Aug 26, 2005^{AUS}	Unreleased	Jul 15, 2005
Chase: Hollywood Stunt Driver	I-Imagine Interactive	BAM! Entertainment	Oct 17, 2002	Unreleased	Sep 24, 2002
Chessmaster	Ubisoft Bucharest	Ubisoft	Unreleased	Unreleased	Nov 1, 2004
Chicago Enforcer	Touchdown Entertainment	Kemco	Unreleased	Unreleased	Feb 23, 2005
Chicken Little	Avalanche Software	Buena Vista Games	Nov 11, 2005^{AUS} Jan 6, 2006^{EU}	Unreleased	Oct 18, 2005
The Chronicles of Narnia: The Lion, the Witch and the Wardrobe	Traveller's Tales	Buena Vista Games	Mar 31, 2006	Unreleased	Nov 15, 2005
The Chronicles of Riddick: Escape from Butcher Bay	Starbreeze Studios; Tigon Studios	Vivendi Universal Games	Aug 13, 2004	Unreleased	Jun 1, 2004
Circus Maximus: Chariot Wars	Kodiak Interactive	Encore^{NA} THQ^{PAL}	Jun 28, 2002	Unreleased	Feb 26, 2002
Classified: The Sentinel Crisis	Torus Games	Global Star Software	Apr 29, 2006	Unreleased	Apr 13, 2006
Close Combat: First to Fight	Destineer	2K Games	Apr 29, 2005	Unreleased	Apr 7, 2005
Club Football	Codemasters	Codemasters	Oct 10, 2003	Unreleased	Unreleased
Club Football 2005	Codemasters	Codemasters	Oct 15, 2004	Unreleased	Unreleased
Codename: Kids Next Door – Operation: V.I.D.E.O.G.A.M.E.	High Voltage Software	Global Star Software	Dec 2, 2005	Unreleased	Oct 11, 2005
Cold Fear	Darkworks	Ubisoft	Mar 30, 2005	Unreleased	Mar 15, 2005
Cold War	Mindware Studios	DreamCatcher Games	Nov 7, 2005^{AUS} Nov 11, 2005^{EU}	Unreleased	Sep 27, 2005
Colin McRae Rally 04	Codemasters	Codemasters	Sep 19, 2003	Unreleased	Mar 2, 2004
Colin McRae Rally 2005	Codemasters	Codemasters	Sep 24, 2004	Unreleased	Sep 28, 2004
Colin McRae Rally 3	Codemasters	Codemasters	Oct 25, 2002	Unreleased	Feb 18, 2003
College Hoops 2K6	Visual Concepts	2K Sports	Unreleased	Unreleased	Nov 23, 2005
College Hoops 2K7	Visual Concepts	2K Sports	Unreleased	Unreleased	Nov 20, 2006
Combat Elite: WWII Paratroopers	BattleBorne Entertainment	SouthPeak Interactive	Unreleased	Unreleased	Nov 21, 2005
Combat: Task Force 121	Direct Action Games	Groove Games	Unreleased	Unreleased	Mar 22, 2005
Commandos: Strike Force	Pyro Studios	Eidos Interactive	Mar 17, 2006	Unreleased	Apr 4, 2006
Commandos 2: Men of Courage	Pyro Studios	Eidos Interactive	Sep 13, 2002^{EU} Feb 6, 2004^{AUS}	Unreleased	Sep 17, 2002
Conan	Cauldron	TDK Mediactive Europe	Apr 7, 2004^{EU} Apr 8, 2004^{UK}	Unreleased	Unreleased
Conflict: Desert Storm	Pivotal Games	SCi Games^{PAL} Gotham Games^{NA}	Sep 13, 2002^{EU} Sep 20, 2002^{AUS}	Unreleased	Oct 1, 2002
Conflict: Desert Storm II	Pivotal Games	SCi Games^{PAL} Gotham Games^{NA}	Sep 18, 2003^{AUS} Sep 19, 2003^{EU}	Unreleased	Oct 7, 2003
Conflict: Global Terror Conflict: Global Storm (PAL)	Pivotal Games	SCi Games^{PAL} 2K Games^{NA}	Sep 30, 2005	Unreleased	Oct 6, 2005
Conflict: Vietnam	Pivotal Games	SCi Games^{PAL} Global Star Software^{NA}	Sep 3, 2004^{EU} Sep 11, 2004^{AUS}	Unreleased	Oct 6, 2004
Conker: Live & Reloaded	Rare	Microsoft Game Studios	Jun 24, 2005^{EU} Jul 7, 2005^{AUS}	Jun 30, 2005	Jun 21, 2005
Conspiracy: Weapons of Mass Destruction	Kuju Entertainment	Oxygen Interactive	Aug 19, 2005	Unreleased	Unreleased
Constantine	Bits Studios	THQ^{NA} SCi Games^{PAL} Marvelous Entertainment^{JP}	Mar 4, 2005	Apr 21, 2005	Feb 17, 2005
Corvette	Steel Monkeys	TDK Mediactive	Unreleased	Unreleased	Dec 10, 2003
Counter-Strike	Ritual Entertainment; Turtle Rock Studios	Microsoft Game Studios	Dec 5, 2003	Mar 25, 2004	Nov 18, 2003
Crash Bandicoot: The Wrath of Cortex	Traveller's Tales	Universal Interactive	Apr 26, 2002	Oct 24, 2002	Apr 16, 2002
Crash 'n' Burn	Climax Racing	Eidos Interactive	Dec 10, 2004	Unreleased	Nov 15, 2004
Crash Nitro Kart	Vicarious Visions	Universal Interactive	Nov 28, 2003^{EU} Dec 3, 2003^{AUS}	Unreleased	Nov 11, 2003
Crash Tag Team Racing	Radical Entertainment	Vivendi Universal Games	Nov 3, 2005^{AUS} Nov 4, 2005^{EU}	Unreleased	Oct 21, 2005
Crash Twinsanity	Traveller's Tales	Vivendi Universal Games	Oct 8, 2004^{EU} Oct 28, 2004^{AUS}	Unreleased	Sep 28, 2004
Crazy Taxi 3: High Roller	Hitmaker	Sega	Sep 20, 2002	Jul 25, 2002	Jul 23, 2002
Cricket 2005	EA Canada; HB Studios	EA Sports	Jul 1, 2005^{EU} Jul 12, 2005^{AUS}	Unreleased	Unreleased
Crime Life: Gang Wars	Hothouse Creations	Konami	Nov 11, 2005	Unreleased	Nov 22, 2005
Crimson Sea	Koei	Koei	Mar 28, 2003	Dec 12, 2002	Dec 16, 2002
Crimson Skies: High Road to Revenge	FASA Studio	Microsoft Game Studios	Oct 31, 2003	May 20, 2004	Oct 21, 2003
Crouching Tiger, Hidden Dragon	Bergsala Lightweight; Genki	Ubi Soft	Jan 16, 2004	Unreleased	Dec 9, 2003
Crusty Demons	Fluent Entertainment	Deep Silver	Unreleased	Unreleased	Jun 27, 2006
CSI: Crime Scene Investigation	369 Interactive	Ubisoft	Feb 4, 2005	Unreleased	Dec 14, 2004
Curious George	Monkey Bar Games	Namco	Unreleased	Unreleased	Feb 1, 2006
Curse: The Eye of Isis	Asylum Entertainment	DreamCatcher Interactive^{NA} Wanadoo Edition^{PAL}	Nov 14, 2003	Unreleased	Oct 28, 2003
The Da Vinci Code	The Collective	2K Games	May 19, 2006	Unreleased	May 16, 2006
Daemon Vector (Gui Yi) (Note: This game was only released in Taiwan)	XPEC Entertainment	XPEC Entertainment	Unreleased	Jun 21, 2004^{TW}	Unreleased
Dai Senryaku VII: Modern Military Tactics Daisenryaku VII (JP)	SystemSoft	SystemSoft^{JP} Kemco^{NA}	Unreleased	May 29, 2004	Feb 16, 2005
Dakar 2: The World's Ultimate Rally	Acclaim Studios Cheltenham	Acclaim Entertainment	Jun 6, 2003	Unreleased	Jun 19, 2003
Dance Dance Revolution Ultramix Dancing Stage Unleashed (PAL)	Konami Computer Entertainment Hawaii	Konami	Mar 12, 2004	Unreleased	Nov 19, 2003
Dance Dance Revolution Ultramix 2 Dancing Stage Unleashed 2 (PAL)	Konami Computer Entertainment Hawaii	Konami	May 13, 2005	Unreleased	Nov 18, 2004
Dance Dance Revolution Ultramix 3 Dancing Stage Unleashed 3 (PAL)	Konami Computer Entertainment Hawaii	Konami	Mar 17, 2006	Unreleased	Nov 15, 2005
Dance Dance Revolution Ultramix 4	Konami Computer Entertainment Hawaii	Konami	Unreleased	Unreleased	Nov 14, 2006
Dance: UK	Broadsword Interactive	Bigben Interactive	Jul 2, 2004	Unreleased	Unreleased
Dark Summit	Radical Entertainment	THQ	Mar 22, 2002	Unreleased	Nov 15, 2001
Darkwatch	High Moon Studios	Capcom^{NA} Ubisoft^{PAL}	Oct 6, 2005^{AUS} Oct 7, 2005^{EU}	Unreleased	Aug 16, 2005
Dave Mirra Freestyle BMX 2	Z-Axis	Acclaim Max Sports	Mar 14, 2002	Unreleased	Nov 29, 2001
David Beckham Soccer	Rage Software	Rage Software	Jun 7, 2002	Unreleased	Unreleased
Dead Man's Hand	Human Head Studios	Atari	Apr 29, 2004	Sep 2, 2004	Mar 2, 2004
Dead or Alive 3	Team Ninja	Tecmo^{NA/JP} Microsoft Game Studios^{PAL}	Mar 14, 2002	Feb 22, 2002	Nov 15, 2001
Dead or Alive 1 Ultimate	Team Ninja	Tecmo	Feb 18, 2005	Nov 3, 2004	Oct 26, 2004
Dead or Alive 2 Ultimate	Team Ninja	Tecmo	Feb 18, 2005	Nov 3, 2004	Oct 26, 2004
Dead or Alive Xtreme Beach Volleyball	Team Ninja	Tecmo	Mar 28, 2003	Jan 23, 2003	Jan 21, 2003
Dead to Rights	Namco Hometek	Namco	Feb 21, 2003	Nov 28, 2002	Aug 20, 2002
Dead to Rights II	Widescreen Games	Namco	Oct 28, 2005	Unreleased	Apr 12, 2005
Deathrow	Southend Interactive	Ubi Soft	Oct 18, 2002	Unreleased	Oct 22, 2002
Defender	Inevitable Entertainment	Midway	Mar 24, 2003	Unreleased	Oct 21, 2002
Def Jam: Fight for NY	AKI Corporation; EA Canada	EA Games	Sep 24, 2004^{AUS} Oct 1, 2004^{EU}	Unreleased	Sep 21, 2004
Delta Force: Black Hawk Down	Climax London	NovaLogic	Sep 2, 2005	Unreleased	Jul 26, 2005
Dennou Taisen: DroneZ	Zetha GameZ	Metro3D	Unreleased	Apr 22, 2004	Unreleased
Destroy All Humans!	Pandemic Studios	THQ	Jun 24, 2005	Unreleased	Jun 21, 2005
Destroy All Humans! 2	Pandemic Studios	THQ	Oct 20, 2006^{EU} Oct 26, 2006^{AUS}	Unreleased	Oct 17, 2006
Deus Ex: Invisible War	Ion Storm	Eidos Interactive	Mar 5, 2004	Jun 17, 2004	Dec 2, 2003
Die Hard: Vendetta	Bits Studios	Vivendi Universal Games International	Jun 27, 2003	Unreleased	Unreleased
Digimon Rumble Arena 2 Digimon Battle Chronicle (JP)	Bandai; Black Ship Games	Bandai	Oct 15, 2004^{EU} Oct 22, 2004^{AUS}	Jul 29, 2004	Sep 3, 2004
Digimon World 4 Digimon World X (JP)	BEC	Bandai	Unreleased	Jan 6, 2005	Jun 2, 2005
Dino Crisis 3	Capcom Production Studio 4	Capcom	Nov 7, 2003	Jun 26, 2003	Sep 16, 2003
Dinosaur Hunting	Scarab	Metro3D	Unreleased	Sep 18, 2003	Unreleased
Dinotopia: The Sunstone Odyssey	Vicious Cycle Software	TDK Mediactive^{NA} Global Star Software^{PAL}	Apr 16, 2004	Unreleased	Jul 31, 2003
Disney's Extreme Skate Adventure	Toys for Bob	Activision	Sep 5, 2003	Unreleased	Sep 3, 2003
Doom 3	Vicarious Visions	Activision	Apr 4, 2005	Unreleased	Apr 4, 2005
Doom 3: Resurrection of Evil	Nerve Software	Activision	Oct 21, 2005	Unreleased	Oct 5, 2005
Double-S.T.E.A.L. - The Second Clash	Bunkasha Publishing	Microsoft	Unreleased	Aug 4, 2005	Unreleased
Dr. Muto	Midway Games West	Midway	Mar 21, 2003	Unreleased	Nov 11, 2002
Dragon Ball Z: Sagas	Avalanche Software	Atari	Unreleased	Unreleased	Mar 22, 2005
Dragon's Lair 3D: Return to the Lair	Dragonstone Software	Ubi Soft	Mar 5, 2004	Unreleased	Nov 18, 2002
Drake of the 99 Dragons	Idol FX	Majesco	Unreleased	Unreleased	Nov 4, 2003
Dreamfall: The Longest Journey	Funcom	Aspyr^{NA} Micro Application^{PAL}	Aug 11, 2006	Unreleased	Apr 18, 2006
Drihoo	Highwaystar	Highwaystar	Unreleased	Nov 28, 2002	Unreleased
Driver 3	Reflections Interactive	Atari	Jun 22, 2004^{EU} Jun 24, 2004^{AUS}	Unreleased	Jun 21, 2004
Driver: Parallel Lines	Reflections Interactive	Atari	Mar 17, 2006^{EU} Mar 23, 2006^{AUS}	Unreleased	Mar 14, 2006
The Dukes of Hazzard: Return of the General Lee	Ratbag Games	Ubisoft	Oct 14, 2004^{AUS} Oct 15, 2004^{EU}	Unreleased	Sep 28, 2004
Dungeons & Dragons: Heroes	Atari Interactive Hunt Valley Studio	Atari, Inc.	Nov 14, 2003^{EU} Nov 21, 2003^{AUS}	Unreleased	Sep 16, 2003
Dynasty Warriors 3	Omega Force	Koei	Dec 6, 2002	Sep 26, 2002	Sep 30, 2002
Dynasty Warriors 4	Omega Force	Koei	Nov 14, 2003	Sep 4, 2003	Sep 5, 2003
Dynasty Warriors 5	Omega Force	Koei	Sep 23, 2005	Aug 25, 2005	Sep 13, 2005
Ed, Edd n Eddy: The Mis-Edventures	Artificial Mind and Movement	Midway	Unreleased	Unreleased	Oct 31, 2005
Egg Mania: Eggstreme Madness Eggo Mania (PAL)	HotGen	Kemco	Oct 25, 2002	Oct 3, 2002	Sep 11, 2002
The Elder Scrolls III: Morrowind	Bethesda Game Studios	Bethesda Softworks^{NA} Ubi Soft^{PAL}	Nov 22, 2002	Unreleased	Jun 6, 2002
Enclave	Starbreeze Studios	Swing! Entertainment^{PAL} Conspiracy Entertainment^{NA}	Jul 19, 2002	Unreleased	Jul 29, 2002
England International Football	Codemasters	Codemasters	Apr 30, 2004	Unreleased	Unreleased
Enter the Matrix	Shiny Entertainment	Infogrames	May 15, 2003	Jun 19, 2003	May 15, 2003
Eragon	Stormfront Studios	Vivendi Games	Nov 23, 2006^{AUS} Nov 24, 2006^{EU}	Unreleased	Nov 14, 2006
ESPN College Hoops	Kush Games	Sega	Unreleased	Unreleased	Nov 11, 2003
ESPN College Hoops 2K5	Visual Concepts	Sega	Unreleased	Unreleased	Nov 17, 2004
ESPN International Winter Sports 2002 International Winter Sports (PAL) Hyper Sports 2002 Winter (JP)	Konami Computer Entertainment Osaka	Konami	Apr 12, 2002	Feb 22, 2002	Jan 29, 2002
ESPN Major League Baseball	Blue Shift	Sega	Unreleased	Unreleased	Apr 6, 2004
ESPN MLS ExtraTime 2002	Konami Computer Entertainment Hawaii	Konami	Unreleased	Unreleased	Mar 26, 2002
ESPN NBA 2K5	Visual Concepts	Sega^{NA} Global Star Software^{PAL}	Jan 28, 2005^{AUS} Feb 4, 2005^{EU}	Unreleased	Sep 28, 2004
ESPN NBA 2Night 2002	Konami	Konami	Unreleased	Mar 28, 2002	Apr 16, 2002
ESPN NBA Basketball	Visual Concepts	Sega	Nov 28, 2003	Unreleased	Oct 21, 2003
ESPN NFL 2K5	Visual Concepts	Sega^{NA} Global Star Software^{PAL}	Feb 4, 2005	Unreleased	Jul 20, 2004
ESPN NFL Football	Visual Concepts	Sega	Nov 27, 2003^{AUS} Nov 28, 2003^{EU}	Unreleased	Sep 2, 2003
ESPN NFL PrimeTime 2002	Farsight Technologies	Konami	Unreleased	Unreleased	Jan 22, 2002
ESPN NHL 2K5	Kush Games	Sega^{NA} Global Star Software^{PAL}	Jan 28, 2005^{AUS} Feb 4, 2005^{EU}	Unreleased	Sep 1, 2004
ESPN NHL Hockey	Kush Games	Sega	Nov 28, 2003	Unreleased	Sep 9, 2003
ESPN Winter X-Games Snowboarding 2002 ESPN Winter Games Snowboarding 2 (PAL)	Konami Computer Entertainment Osaka	Konami	Jun 7, 2002	Feb 22, 2002	Mar 6, 2002
Evil Dead: A Fistful of Boomstick	VIS Entertainment	THQ	Jun 27, 2003	Unreleased	Jun 17, 2003
Evil Dead: Regeneration	Cranky Pants Games	THQ	Sep 16, 2005^{AUS} Sep 30, 2005^{EU}	Unreleased	Sep 13, 2005
ExaSkeleton	Production I.G	KiKi Co., Ltd.	Unreleased	Dec 18, 2003	Unreleased
F1 2001	EA UK	EA Sports	Unreleased	Unreleased	Nov 19, 2001
F1 2002	Visual Science	EA Sports	Apr 5, 2002	Apr 4, 2002	Unreleased
F1 Career Challenge	Visual Science	EA Sports	Jun 23, 2003^{AUS} Jun 27, 2003^{EU}	Unreleased	Unreleased
Fable	Big Blue Box Studios	Microsoft Game Studios	Oct 8, 2004^{EU} Oct 14, 2004^{AUS}	Mar 17, 2005	Sep 14, 2004
Fable: The Lost Chapters	Lionhead Studios	Microsoft Game Studios	Oct 21, 2005^{EU} Nov 24, 2005^{AUS}	Unreleased	Oct 18, 2005
Fahrenheit Indigo Prophecy (NA)	Quantic Dream	Atari	Sep 16, 2005	Unreleased	Sep 20, 2005
The Fairly OddParents: Breakin' Da Rules	Blitz Games	THQ	Unreleased	Unreleased	Nov 10, 2003
Fallout: Brotherhood of Steel	Interplay Entertainment	Interplay Entertainment	Apr 2, 2004	Apr 28, 2005^{AS}	Jan 13, 2004
Family Guy Video Game!	High Voltage Software	2K Games	Oct 26, 2006^{EU} Nov 3, 2006^{AUS}	Unreleased	Oct 17, 2006
Fantastic Four	7 Studios	Activision	Jul 1, 2005^{AUS} Jul 15, 2005^{EU}	Unreleased	Jun 27, 2005
Far Cry Instincts	Ubisoft Montreal	Ubisoft	Sep 29, 2005^{AUS} Sep 30, 2005^{EU}	Unreleased	Sep 27, 2005
Far Cry Instincts: Evolution	Ubisoft Montreal	Ubisoft	Mar 30, 2006	Unreleased	Mar 28, 2006
Fatal Frame Project Zero (PAL)	Tecmo	Tecmo^{NA/JP} Microsoft Game Studios^{PAL}	May 2, 2003	Feb 6, 2003	Nov 27, 2002
Fatal Frame II: Crimson Butterfly Director's Cut Project Zero II: Crimson Butterfly Director's Cut (PAL)	Tecmo	Tecmo^{NA/JP} Microsoft Game Studios^{PAL}	Feb 4, 2005	Nov 11, 2004	Nov 1, 2004
FIFA 06 FIFA Soccer 06 (NA)	EA Canada	EA Sports	Sep 27, 2005^{AUS} Sep 30, 2005^{EU}	Unreleased	Oct 4, 2005
FIFA 07 FIFA Soccer 07 (NA)	EA Canada	EA Sports	Sep 28, 2006^{AUS} Sep 29, 2006^{EU}	Unreleased	Oct 3, 2006
FIFA Football 2003 FIFA Soccer 2003 (NA)	EA Canada	EA Sports	Nov 1, 2002	Unreleased	Nov 12, 2002
FIFA Football 2004 FIFA Soccer 2004 (NA)	EA Canada	EA Sports	Oct 24, 2003	Unreleased	Nov 4, 2003
FIFA Football 2005 FIFA Soccer 2005 (NA)	EA Canada	EA Sports	Oct 8, 2004^{EU} Oct 12, 2004^{AUS}	Unreleased	Oct 12, 2004
FIFA Street	EA Canada	EA Sports BIG	Mar 11, 2005	Unreleased	Feb 22, 2005
FIFA Street 2	EA Canada	EA Sports BIG	Mar 3, 2006^{EU} Mar 6, 2006^{AUS}	Unreleased	Feb 28, 2006
Fight Club	Genuine Games	Vivendi Universal Games	Dec 10, 2004	Unreleased	Nov 16, 2004
Fight Night 2004	EA Canada; NuFX	EA Sports	Apr 30, 2004	Unreleased	Apr 5, 2004
Fight Night Round 2	EA Chicago	EA Sports	Mar 18, 2005^{EU} Mar 22, 2005^{AUS}	Unreleased	Mar 1, 2005
Fight Night Round 3	EA Chicago	EA Sports	Mar 6, 2006^{AUS} Mar 10, 2006^{EU}	Unreleased	Feb 20, 2006
FILA World Tour Tennis	Hokus Pokus	THQ	Aug 23, 2002	Unreleased	Unreleased
Final Fight: Streetwise	Secret Level, Inc.	Capcom	Apr 5, 2006^{AUS} Apr 7, 2006^{EU}	Unreleased	Feb 28, 2006
Finding Nemo	Traveller's Tales	THQ	Sep 3, 2003^{AUS} Sep 26, 2003^{EU}	Unreleased	May 9, 2003
Fire Blade	Kuju Entertainment	Midway	Feb 28, 2003	Unreleased	Nov 17, 2002
FlatOut	Bugbear Entertainment	Empire Interactive	Nov 5, 2004^{EU} Nov 12, 2004^{AUS}	Unreleased	Jul 12, 2005
FlatOut 2	Bugbear Entertainment	Empire Interactive^{PAL} Vivendi Universal Games^{NA}	Jun 30, 2006	Unreleased	Aug 1, 2006
Flight Academy	AquaSystem	AquaSystem	Unreleased	Aug 29, 2002	Unreleased
Ford Mustang: The Legend Lives	Eutechnyx	2K Games^{NA} Global Star Software^{PAL}	Jul 15, 2005	Unreleased	Apr 19, 2005
Ford Racing 2	Razorworks	Empire Interactive^{PAL} Gotham Games^{NA}	Oct 31, 2003	Unreleased	Nov 3, 2003
Ford Racing 3	Razorworks	Empire Interactive^{PAL} 2K Games^{NA}	Oct 29, 2004^{EU} Nov 4, 2004^{AUS}	Unreleased	Mar 22, 2005
Ford Street Racing Ford Bold Moves Street Racing (NA)	Razorworks	Empire Interactive^{PAL} Eidos Interactive^{NA}	Feb 24, 2006	Unreleased	Sep 19, 2006
Ford vs. Chevy	Eutechnyx	Global Star Software	Unreleased	Unreleased	Nov 10, 2005
Forgotten Realms: Demon Stone	Stormfront Studios	Atari	Feb 11, 2005	Unreleased	Nov 17, 2004
Forza Motorsport	Turn 10 Studios	Microsoft Game Studios	May 13, 2005	May 12, 2005	May 3, 2005
Freaky Flyers	Midway Studios San Diego	Midway	Oct 10, 2003	Unreleased	Aug 4, 2003
Freedom Fighters	IO Interactive	EA Games	Sep 25, 2003^{AUS} Sep 26, 2003^{EU}	Unreleased	Oct 1, 2003
Freestyle MetalX	Deibus Studios	Midway Sports Asylum	Sep 19, 2003	Unreleased	Oct 3, 2003
Freestyle Street Soccer Urban Freestyle Soccer (PAL)	Gusto Games	Acclaim Entertainment	Feb 13, 2004	Unreleased	Jan 27, 2004
Frogger: Ancient Shadow	Hudson Soft	Konami	Unreleased	Unreleased	Sep 27, 2005
Frogger Beyond	Konami Computer Entertainment Hawaii; Konami Software Shanghai	Konami	Unreleased	Unreleased	Dec 10, 2002
Full Spectrum Warrior	Pandemic Studios	THQ	Jun 25, 2004	Sep 30, 2004	Jun 1, 2004
Full Spectrum Warrior: Ten Hammers	Pandemic Studios	THQ	Jun 23, 2006	Unreleased	Mar 27, 2006
Furious Karting	Babylon Software	Infogrames	Jan 24, 2003	Unreleased	Mar 28, 2003
Futurama	Unique Development Studios	SCi Games^{PAL} Vivendi Universal Games^{NA}	Aug 1, 2003^{EU} Aug 8, 2003^{AUS}	Unreleased	Aug 12, 2003
Future Tactics: The Uprising	Zed Two	Crave Entertainment^{NA} JoWooD Productions^{PAL}	Oct 22, 2004	Unreleased	May 7, 2004
Fuzion Frenzy	Blitz Games	Microsoft Game Studios	Mar 14, 2002	Unreleased	Nov 15, 2001
Galaxy Angel	Broccoli	Broccoli	Unreleased	Jan 23, 2003	Unreleased
Galleon	Confounding Factor	SCi Games^{PAL} Atlus^{NA}	Jun 11, 2004	Unreleased	Aug 3, 2004
Gauntlet Dark Legacy	Midway Games West	Midway	Jun 28, 2002	Unreleased	Apr 23, 2002
Gauntlet: Seven Sorrows	Midway Studios San Diego	Midway	Feb 28, 2006^{AUS} Mar 24, 2006^{EU}	Unreleased	Dec 12, 2005
Gene Troopers	Cauldron	Playlogic Entertainment	Nov 9, 2005	Unreleased	Unreleased
Genma Onimusha	Capcom	Capcom	Mar 22, 2002	Feb 22, 2002	Jan 29, 2002
Ghost Master: The Gravenville Chronicles	Spiral House	Empire Interactive	Aug 27, 2004	Unreleased	Unreleased
Gladiator: Sword of Vengeance	Acclaim Studios Manchester	Acclaim Entertainment	Dec 5, 2003	Unreleased	Nov 4, 2003
Gladius	LucasArts	LucasArts	Nov 28, 2003	Unreleased	Oct 28, 2003
Goblin Commander: Unleash the Horde	Jaleco Entertainment	Jaleco Entertainment	Mar 19, 2004	Unreleased	Nov 11, 2003
The Godfather	Page 44 Studios	Electronic Arts	Mar 23, 2006^{AUS} Mar 24, 2006^{EU}	Unreleased	Mar 21, 2006
Godzilla: Destroy All Monsters Melee	Pipeworks Software	Infogrames	May 8, 2003	Unreleased	Apr 15, 2003
Godzilla: Save the Earth	Pipeworks Software	Atari	Nov 19, 2004^{EU} Dec 10, 2004^{AUS}	Unreleased	Nov 16, 2004
GoldenEye: Rogue Agent	EA Los Angeles	EA Games	Nov 23, 2004^{AUS} Dec 3, 2004^{EU}	Unreleased	Nov 22, 2004
Gotcha!	Sixteen Tons Entertainment	Promotion Software	Apr 5, 2005	Unreleased	Unreleased
Grabbed by the Ghoulies	Rare	Microsoft Game Studios	Nov 21, 2003	Apr 29, 2004	Oct 21, 2003
Grand Theft Auto III	Rockstar Vienna	Rockstar Games^{WW} Capcom^{JP}	Jan 2, 2004	Jul 29, 2004	Nov 4, 2003
Grand Theft Auto: San Andreas	Rockstar North	Rockstar Games	Jun 10, 2005	Unreleased	Jun 7, 2005
Grand Theft Auto: Vice City	Rockstar Vienna	Rockstar Games^{WW} Capcom^{JP}	Jan 2, 2004	Jul 29, 2004	Nov 4, 2003
Gravity Games Bike: Street Vert Dirt	Midway Studios San Diego	Midway Sports Asylum	Sep 27, 2002	Unreleased	Sep 4, 2002
The Great Escape	Pivotal Games	Gotham Games^{NA} SCi Games^{PAL}	Aug 29, 2003	Unreleased	Jul 23, 2003
Greg Hastings' Tournament Paintball	The Whole Experience	Activision	Mar 24, 2005	Unreleased	Nov 16, 2004
Greg Hastings' Tournament Paintball MAX'D	The Whole Experience	Activision	Dec 20, 2005	Unreleased	Oct 18, 2005
Grooverider: Slot Car Thunder	King of the Jungle	Encore	Unreleased	Unreleased	Sep 25, 2003
Group S Challenge Circus Drive (JP)	DigitalStudio	Capcom	Sep 26, 2003	Aug 28, 2003	Nov 11, 2003
Guilty Gear Isuka	Arc System Works	Sammy	Unreleased	Dec 16, 2004	Unreleased
Guilty Gear X2 #Reload	Arc System Works	Sammy^{JP} Majesco^{NA} Zoo Digital Publishing^{PAL}	Nov 26, 2004	Apr 29, 2004	Sep 14, 2004
Gun	Neversoft	Activision	Nov 9, 2005^{AUS} Nov 11, 2005^{EU}	Unreleased	Nov 8, 2005
Gungriffon Allied Strike	Game Arts	Tecmo	Apr 8, 2005	Dec 16, 2004	Dec 14, 2004
Gun Metal	Rage Games	Rage Games^{PAL} Majesco^{NA}	Jun 28, 2002	Unreleased	Aug 1, 2002
Gunvalkyrie	Smilebit	Sega	May 17, 2002	Mar 21, 2002	Mar 19, 2002
The Guy Game	Topheavy Studios	Gathering	Unreleased	Unreleased	Aug 31, 2004
Half-Life 2	Valve	Electronic Arts	Nov 18, 2005	Unreleased	Nov 15, 2005
Halo: Combat Evolved	Bungie	Microsoft Game Studios	Mar 14, 2002	Apr 25, 2002	Nov 15, 2001
Halo 2	Bungie	Microsoft Game Studios	Nov 9, 2004^{AUS} Nov 11, 2004^{EU}	Nov 11, 2004	Nov 9, 2004
Harry Potter and the Chamber of Secrets	Eurocom	EA Games	Nov 15, 2002	Nov 23, 2002^{KOR}	Nov 15, 2002
Harry Potter and the Goblet of Fire	EA UK	Electronic Arts	Nov 11, 2005	Unreleased	Nov 8, 2005
Harry Potter and the Philosopher's Stone Harry Potter and the Sorcerer's Stone (NA)	Warthog Games	EA Games	Dec 12, 2003	Unreleased	Dec 12, 2003
Harry Potter and the Prisoner of Azkaban	EA UK	EA Games	May 29, 2004	Unreleased	Jun 2, 2004
Harry Potter: Quidditch World Cup	EA UK	EA Games	Nov 7, 2003	Unreleased	Oct 28, 2003
The Haunted Mansion	High Voltage Software	TDK Mediactive	Mar 5, 2003	Unreleased	Oct 16, 2003
Headhunter Redemption	Amuze	Sega	Aug 27, 2004^{EU} Sep 3, 2004^{AUS}	Unreleased	Sep 21, 2004
Hello Kitty: Roller Rescue Hello Kitty: Mission Rescue (AS)	XPEC Entertainment	XPEC Entertainment^{AS} Empire Interactive^{PAL}	Sep 9, 2005	Apr 1, 2005^{AS}	Unreleased
Heroes of the Pacific	IR Gurus	Codemasters^{PAL} Ubisoft^{NA}	Sep 23, 2005	Unreleased	Sep 28, 2005
High Heat Major League Baseball 2004	The 3DO Company	The 3DO Company	Unreleased	Unreleased	Mar 6, 2003
High Rollers Casino	Cinemaware; Virtual Toys	Mud Duck Productions	Unreleased	Unreleased	Nov 11, 2004
Hitman 2: Silent Assassin	IO Interactive	Eidos Interactive	Oct 4, 2002^{EU} Oct 18, 2002^{AUS}	Jul 3, 2003	Oct 1, 2002
Hitman: Blood Money	IO Interactive	Eidos Interactive	May 26, 2006^{EU} Jun 1, 2006^{AUS}	Unreleased	May 30, 2006
Hitman: Contracts	IO Interactive	Eidos Interactive	Apr 30, 2004^{EU} May 13, 2004^{AUS}	Oct 14, 2004	Apr 20, 2004
The Hobbit	Inevitable Entertainment	Vivendi Universal Games	Nov 28, 2003	Unreleased	Nov 11, 2003
Hot Wheels: Stunt Track Challenge	Climax Brighton	THQ	Nov 26, 2004	Unreleased	Nov 9, 2004
The House of the Dead III	Wow Entertainment	Sega	Mar 14, 2003	Jan 30, 2003	Oct 24, 2002
Hulk	Radical Entertainment	Universal Interactive	Jun 13, 2003^{EU} Jun 26, 2003^{AUS}	Unreleased	May 28, 2003
Hummer Badlands	Eutechnyx	Global Star Software	Unreleased	Unreleased	Apr 13, 2006
Hunter: The Reckoning	High Voltage Software	Interplay Entertainment	Jul 5, 2002	Unreleased	May 21, 2002
Hunter: The Reckoning – Redeemer	High Voltage Software	Vivendi Universal Games	Nov 21, 2003	Jan 22, 2004	Oct 28, 2003
The Hustle: Detroit Streets	Blade Interactive	Activision	Unreleased	Unreleased	Apr 26, 2006
I-Ninja	Argonaut Games	Namco	Unreleased	Unreleased	Dec 4, 2003
Ice Age 2: The Meltdown	Eurocom	Vivendi Universal Games	Mar 31, 2006	Unreleased	Mar 14, 2006
IHRA Drag Racing 2004	Super Happy Fun Fun	Bethesda Softworks	Unreleased	Unreleased	Nov 2003
IHRA Drag Racing: Sportsman Edition	Bethesda Game Studios	Bethesda Softworks	Unreleased	Unreleased	Jun 12, 2006
IHRA Professional Drag Racing 2005	Bethesda Game Studios	Bethesda Softworks	Unreleased	Unreleased	Nov 2004
Innocent Tears	Global A Entertainment	Kobi	Unreleased	Dec 5, 2002	Unreleased
The Incredible Hulk: Ultimate Destruction	Radical Entertainment	Vivendi Universal Games	Sep 9, 2005	Unreleased	Aug 23, 2005
The Incredibles	Heavy Iron Studios	THQ	Nov 5, 2004^{EU} Nov 16, 2004^{AUS}	Dec 2, 2004	Nov 1, 2004
The Incredibles: Rise of the Underminer	Heavy Iron Studios	THQ	Nov 11, 2005	Unreleased	Nov 1, 2005
Indiana Jones and the Emperor's Tomb	The Collective	LucasArts	Mar 28, 2003	Unreleased	Feb 25, 2003
IndyCar Series	Codemasters	Codemasters	Jun 20, 2003	Unreleased	Jun 26, 2003
IndyCar Series 2005	Codemasters	Codemasters	Jun 25, 2004	Unreleased	Jun 22, 2004
Inside Pitch 2003	Indie Built	Microsoft Game Studios	Unreleased	Oct 23, 2003	May 20, 2003
The Italian Job	Climax Brighton	Eidos Interactive	Sep 12, 2003^{EU} Sep 19, 2003^{AUS}	Unreleased	Jun 24, 2003
Intellivision Lives!	Realtime Associates	Crave Entertainment	Unreleased	Unreleased	Feb 2, 2004
International Superstar Soccer 2	Konami	Konami	May 10, 2002	Unreleased	Unreleased
Iron Phoenix	InterServ International	Sega	Unreleased	Unreleased	Mar 25, 2005
Jacked	Sproing Interactive	Empire Interactive	Feb 10, 2006	Unreleased	Unreleased
Jade Empire	BioWare	Microsoft Game Studios	Apr 22, 2005^{EU} Jun 30, 2005^{AUS}	Jun 16, 2005	Apr 12, 2005
James Bond 007: Agent Under Fire	Savage Entertainment	EA Games	Jun 14, 2002	Unreleased	Mar 26, 2002
James Bond 007: Everything or Nothing	EA Redwood Shores; EA Canada	EA Games	Feb 27, 2004	Unreleased	Feb 17, 2004
James Bond 007: From Russia with Love	EA Redwood Shores	Electronic Arts	Nov 18, 2005^{EU} Nov 21, 2005^{AUS}	Unreleased	Nov 1, 2005
James Bond 007: Nightfire	Eurocom	EA Games	Nov 29, 2003	Unreleased	Nov 19, 2002
James Cameron's Dark Angel	Radical Entertainment	Sierra Entertainment	Feb 21, 2003	Unreleased	Nov 19, 2002
Jaws Unleashed	Appaloosa Interactive	Majesco	Oct 20, 2006^{EU} Oct 26, 2006^{AUS}	Unreleased	May 23, 2006
Jet Set Radio Future	Smilebit	Sega	Mar 14, 2002	Feb 22, 2002	Feb 26, 2002
Jikkyō World Soccer 2002	Konami Computer Entertainment Osaka	Konami	Unreleased	May 23, 2002	Unreleased
Jockey's Road	Progress Software	Microsoft	Unreleased	Oct 10, 2002	Unreleased
Judge Dredd: Dredd vs. Death	Rebellion Developments	Vivendi Universal Games International^{PAL} Evolved Games^{NA}	Oct 17, 2003	Unreleased	Feb 23, 2005
Juiced	Juice Games	THQ	Jun 17, 2005	Unreleased	Jun 13, 2005
Jurassic Park: Operation Genesis	Blue Tongue Entertainment	Universal Interactive	Mar 28, 2003	Unreleased	Mar 25, 2003
Just Cause	Avalanche Studios	Eidos Interactive	Sep 22, 2006^{EU} Sep 29, 2006^{AUS}	Unreleased	Sep 27, 2006
Justice League Heroes	Snowblind Studios	Warner Bros. Interactive Entertainment	Nov 24, 2006^{EU} Dec 22, 2006^{AUS}	Unreleased	Oct 17, 2006
Kabuki Warriors	Genki; Lightweight	Crave Entertainment^{NA} Genki^{JP}	Unreleased	Feb 28, 2002	Nov 20, 2001
Kakuto Chojin: Back Alley Brutal	Dream Publishing	Microsoft Game Studios	Unreleased	Jan 1, 2003	Nov 12, 2002
Kao the Kangaroo: Round 2	Tate Interactive	JoWooD Productions	Apr 15, 2005	Unreleased	Unreleased
Karaoke Revolution	Harmonix	Konami	Unreleased	Unreleased	Nov 10, 2004
Karaoke Revolution Party	Harmonix	Konami	Unreleased	Unreleased	Nov 8, 2005
Kelly Slater's Pro Surfer	Treyarch	Activision O2	Oct 14, 2002^{AUS} Oct 18, 2002^{EU}	Unreleased	Sep 17, 2002
Kikou Heidan J-Phoenix +	Takara	Takara	Unreleased	Dec 5, 2002	Unreleased
Kill Switch	Namco USA	Namco	Unreleased	Unreleased	Oct 28, 2003
King Arthur	Krome Studios	Konami	Feb 25, 2005	Unreleased	Nov 16, 2004
Kingdom Under Fire: The Crusaders	Phantagram	Microsoft Game Studios^{NA} Deep Silver^{PAL} Jaleco Entertainment^{JP}	Oct 29, 2004	Jan 27, 2005	Oct 12, 2004
Kingdom Under Fire: Heroes	Blueside; Phantagram	Microsoft Game Studios^{NA} Deep Silver^{PAL}	Sep 30, 2005^{AUS} Oct 7, 2005^{EU}	Unreleased	Sep 20, 2005
The King of Fighters 2002	SNK Playmore	SNK Playmore^{JP/NA}	Nov 2005	Mar 24, 2005	Aug 31, 2005
The King of Fighters 2003	SNK Playmore	SNK Playmore^{JP/NA} Ignition Entertainment^{PAL}	Unreleased	Aug 25, 2005	Aug 31, 2005
The King of Fighters Neowave	SNK Playmore	SNK Playmore	Unreleased	Mar 30, 2006	Apr 18, 2006
Knight's Apprentice: Memorick's Adventures	Microids	Microids^{EU} XS Games^{NA}	Apr 16, 2004	Unreleased	Jun 15, 2004
Knights of the Temple: Infernal Crusade	Starbreeze Studios	TDK Mediactive Europe	Apr 8, 2004	Unreleased	Unreleased
Knights of the Temple II	Cauldron	Playlogic Entertainment	Nov 24, 2005	Unreleased	Unreleased
Knockout Kings 2002	Black Ops Entertainment	EA Sports^{WW} Electronic Arts Square^{JP}	May 3, 2002	Apr 4, 2002	Mar 5, 2002
KOF: Maximum Impact: Maniax	Noise Factory	SNK Playmore	Unreleased	Jun 23, 2005	Jun 28, 2005
Kung Fu Chaos Kung Fu Panic (JP)	Just Add Monsters	Microsoft Game Studios	Apr 11, 2003	May 29, 2003	Feb 25, 2003
L.A. Rush	Midway Studios Newcastle	Midway	Oct 21, 2005	Unreleased	Oct 10, 2005
Land of the Dead: Road to Fiddler's Green	Brainbox Games	Groove Games	Unreleased	Unreleased	Oct 20, 2005
Largo Winch: Empire Under Threat	Dupuis	Ubi Soft	Sep 19, 2002	Unreleased	Unreleased
Legacy of Kain: Defiance	Nixxes Software	Eidos Interactive	Feb 6, 2004	Unreleased	Nov 11, 2003
The Legend of Spyro: A New Beginning	Krome Studios	Vivendi Universal Games	Oct 27, 2006^{EU} Nov 2, 2006^{AUS}	Unreleased	Oct 10, 2006
Legends of Wrestling	Acclaim Studios Salt Lake City	Acclaim Entertainment	Jun 7, 2002	Unreleased	May 28, 2002
Legends of Wrestling II	Acclaim Studios Salt Lake City	Acclaim Entertainment	Feb 7, 2003	Unreleased	Dec 5, 2002
Lego Star Wars: The Video Game	Traveller's Tales	Eidos Interactive; Giant Interactive Entertainment	Apr 22, 2005	Unreleased	Apr 5, 2005
Lego Star Wars II: The Original Trilogy	Traveller's Tales	LucasArts	Sep 11, 2006^{UK} Sep 13, 2006^{EU} Sep 15, 2006^{AUS}	Unreleased	Sep 12, 2006
Leisure Suit Larry: Magna Cum Laude	High Voltage Software	Vivendi Universal Games	Nov 5, 2004	Unreleased	Oct 5, 2004
Lemony Snicket's A Series of Unfortunate Events	Adrenium Games	Activision	Nov 25, 2004	Unreleased	Nov 9, 2004
Links 2004	Indie Built	Microsoft Game Studios	Nov 28, 2003	Mar 25, 2004	Nov 11, 2003
LMA Manager 2003	Codemasters	Codemasters	Nov 15, 2002	Unreleased	Unreleased
LMA Manager 2004	Codemasters	Codemasters	Mar 12, 2004	Unreleased	Unreleased
LMA Manager 2005	Codemasters	Codemasters	Oct 31, 2004	Unreleased	Unreleased
LMA Manager 2006	Codemasters	Codemasters	Nov 18, 2005	Unreleased	Unreleased
Loons: The Fight for Fame	Warthog Games	Infogrames	Sep 27, 2002	Unreleased	Sep 24, 2002
The Lord of the Rings: The Fellowship of the Ring	The Whole Experience	Black Label Games	Nov 7, 2002^{AUS} Nov 8, 2002^{EU}	Unreleased	Sep 24, 2002
The Lord of the Rings: The Return of the King	Hypnos Entertainment	EA Games	Nov 14, 2003	Unreleased	Nov 6, 2003
The Lord of the Rings: The Third Age	EA Redwood Shores	EA Games	Nov 2, 2004^{AUS} Nov 5, 2004^{EU}	Unreleased	Nov 2, 2004
The Lord of the Rings: The Two Towers	Hypnos Entertainment	EA Games	Mar 14, 2003	Unreleased	Dec 30, 2002
Lotus Challenge	Kuju Entertainment	Xicat Interactive	Mar 28, 2003	Unreleased	Apr 30, 2003
Mace Griffin: Bounty Hunter	Warthog Games	Black Label Games	Sep 26, 2003	Unreleased	Jun 19, 2003
Mad Dash Racing	Crystal Dynamics; Nixxes Software	Eidos Interactive	Mar 14, 2002	May 30, 2002	Nov 6, 2001
Madagascar	Toys for Bob	Activision	Jun 30, 2005	Unreleased	May 24, 2005
Madden NFL 06	EA Tiburon	EA Sports	Sep 12, 2005^{AUS} Sep 16, 2005^{EU}	Unreleased	Aug 9, 2005
Madden NFL 07	EA Tiburon	EA Sports	Aug 25, 2006^{EU} Aug 31, 2006^{AUS}	Unreleased	Aug 22, 2006
Madden NFL 08	EA Tiburon	EA Sports	Unreleased	Unreleased	Aug 14, 2007
Madden NFL 09	EA Tiburon	EA Sports	Unreleased	Unreleased	Aug 12, 2008
Madden NFL 2002	EA Tiburon	EA Sports	Unreleased	Unreleased	Nov 15, 2001
Madden NFL 2003	EA Tiburon	EA Sports	Sep 27, 2002	Unreleased	Aug 12, 2002
Madden NFL 2004	EA Tiburon	EA Sports	Sep 5, 2003^{AUS} Sep 12, 2003^{EU}	Unreleased	Aug 11, 2003
Madden NFL 2005	EA Tiburon	EA Sports	Sep 10, 2004^{AUS} Sep 17, 2004^{EU}	Unreleased	Aug 10, 2004
Mafia	Illusion Softworks	Gathering	Mar 26, 2004^{UK} Apr 2, 2004^{EU}	Unreleased	Mar 12, 2004
Magatama	Microsoft Game Studios Japan	Microsoft	Unreleased	Nov 20, 2003	Unreleased
Magic: The Gathering – Battlegrounds	Secret Level, Inc.	Atari	Nov 21, 2003^{EU} Nov 28, 2003^{AUS}	Jul 22, 2004	Nov 18, 2003
Magi Death Fight: Mahou Gakuen	Takuyo	Takuyo	Unreleased	Jul 4, 2002	Unreleased
Major League Baseball 2K5	Kush Games	2K Sports	Unreleased	Unreleased	Feb 23, 2005
Major League Baseball 2K5: World Series Edition	Kush Games	2K Sports	Unreleased	Unreleased	Oct 18, 2005
Major League Baseball 2K6	Kush Games	2K Sports	Unreleased	Unreleased	Apr 3, 2006
Major League Baseball 2K7	Kush Games	2K Sports	Unreleased	Unreleased	Feb 27, 2007
Malice	Argonaut Games	Mud Duck Productions^{NA} Evolved Games^{PAL}	Aug 6, 2004	Unreleased	Jun 2, 2004
Manchester United Manager 2005	Codemasters	Codemasters	Oct 22, 2004	Unreleased	Unreleased
Manhunt	Rockstar North	Rockstar Games	Apr 23, 2004	Unreleased	Apr 20, 2004
Marc Ecko's Getting Up: Contents Under Pressure	The Collective	Atari	Feb 24, 2006	Unreleased	Feb 14, 2006
Marvel: Ultimate Alliance	Raven Software	Activision	Oct 27, 2006^{EU} Nov 1, 2006^{AUS}	Unreleased	Oct 24, 2006
Marvel Nemesis: Rise of the Imperfects	Nihilistic Software	Electronic Arts	Oct 14, 2005	Unreleased	Sep 20, 2005
Marvel vs. Capcom 2	Capcom	Capcom	Nov 29, 2002	Sep 19, 2002	Mar 27, 2003
Mashed: Drive to Survive	Supersonic Software	Empire Interactive	Jun 18, 2004	Unreleased	Unreleased
Mashed: Fully Loaded	Supersonic Software	Empire Interactive	Mar 24, 2005	Unreleased	Unreleased
Mat Hoffman's Pro BMX 2	Rainbow Studios	Activision O2	Oct 4, 2002	Unreleased	Aug 13, 2002
The Matrix: Path of Neo	Shiny Entertainment	Atari	Nov 11, 2005	Unreleased	Nov 8, 2005
Max Payne	Neo Software	Rockstar Games	Mar 14, 2002	Unreleased	Dec 18, 2001
Max Payne 2: The Fall of Max Payne	Rockstar Vienna	Rockstar Games	Dec 5, 2003	Unreleased	Nov 25, 2003
Maximum Chase	Genki	Microsoft Game Studios^{JP} Majesco^{NA}	Unreleased	Sep 26, 2002	Nov 5, 2003
MechAssault	Day 1 Studios	Microsoft Game Studios	Nov 22, 2002	Jun 12, 2003	Nov 12, 2002
MechAssault 2: Lone Wolf	Day 1 Studios	Microsoft Game Studios	Feb 4, 2005	Jan 20, 2005	Dec 28, 2004
Medal of Honor: European Assault	EA Los Angeles	EA Games	Jun 17, 2005	Unreleased	Jun 6, 2005
Medal of Honor: Frontline	EA Los Angeles	EA Games	Dec 6, 2002	Unreleased	Nov 7, 2002
Medal of Honor: Rising Sun	EA Los Angeles	EA Games	Nov 25, 2003^{AUS} Nov 28, 2003^{EU}	Unreleased	Nov 11, 2003
Mega Man Anniversary Collection	Atomic Planet Entertainment	Capcom	Unreleased	Unreleased	Mar 15, 2005
Melbourne Cup Challenge Frankie Dettori Racing (EU)	Sidhe Interactive	Tru Blu Entertainment	Oct 26, 2006^{AUS} Dec 8, 2006^{EU}	Unreleased	Unreleased
Men of Valor	2015	Vivendi Universal Games	Nov 5, 2004	Unreleased	Oct 19, 2004
Mercenaries: Playground of Destruction	Pandemic Studios	LucasArts	Feb 18, 2005	Unreleased	Jan 11, 2005
Metal Arms: Glitch in the System	Swingin' Ape Studios	Vivendi Universal Games	Dec 5, 2003	May 20, 2004	Nov 18, 2003
Metal Dungeon	Panther Software	Panther Software^{JP} Xicat Interactive^{WW}	Dec 6, 2002	Feb 28, 2002	Dec 3, 2002
Metal Gear Solid 2: Substance	Konami Computer Entertainment Japan	Konami	Mar 7, 2003	Unreleased	Nov 5, 2002
Metal Slug 3	SNK	SNK Playmore^{JP/NA} Ignition Entertainment^{PAL}	Nov 4, 2004	Jun 24, 2004	May 25, 2004
Metal Slug 4	SNK Playmore	SNK Playmore^{JP/NA} Ignition Entertainment^{PAL}	Nov 4, 2005	Feb 24, 2005	Aug 16, 2005
Metal Slug 5	SNK Playmore	SNK Playmore^{JP/NA} Ignition Entertainment^{PAL}	Mar 10, 2006	Jul 28, 2005	Aug 16, 2005
Metal Wolf Chaos	FromSoftware	FromSoftware	Unreleased	Dec 22, 2004	Unreleased
Miami Vice	Davilex Games	Davilex Games	Dec 17, 2004	Unreleased	Unreleased
Micro Machines	Infogrames Sheffield House	Infogrames	Nov 8, 2002	Nov 8, 2002^{AS}	Unreleased
Midnight Club II	Rockstar San Diego	Rockstar Games	Jun 20, 2003	Unreleased	Jun 4, 2003
Midnight Club 3: Dub Edition	Rockstar San Diego	Rockstar Games	Apr 15, 2005	Unreleased	Apr 12, 2005
Midnight Club 3: Dub Edition Remix	Rockstar San Diego	Rockstar Games	Mar 17, 2006	Unreleased	Mar 13, 2006
Midtown Madness 3	Digital Illusions CE	Microsoft Game Studios	Jun 27, 2003	Aug 7, 2003	Jun 17, 2003
Midway Arcade Treasures	Digital Eclipse	Midway	Feb 6, 2004	Unreleased	Nov 24, 2003
Midway Arcade Treasures 2	Digital Eclipse	Midway	Oct 29, 2004^{EU} Nov 4, 2004^{AUS}	Unreleased	Oct 11, 2004
Midway Arcade Treasures 3	Backbone Entertainment; Gamestar; Midway Studios San Diego	Midway	Oct 14, 2005	Unreleased	Sep 26, 2005
Mike Tyson Heavyweight Boxing	Atomic Planet Entertainment	Codemasters	Jul 5, 2002	Unreleased	Jul 17, 2002
Minority Report: Everybody Runs	Treyarch	Activision	Dec 6, 2002	Unreleased	Nov 19, 2002
Mission: Impossible – Operation Surma	Paradigm Entertainment	Atari	Dec 5, 2003	Unreleased	Dec 9, 2003
MLB Slugfest 2003	Midway Games	Midway Sports	Unreleased	Unreleased	Aug 26, 2002
MLB Slugfest 2004	Point of View	Midway Sports	Unreleased	Unreleased	Mar 17, 2003
MLB Slugfest 2006	Blue Shift	Midway	Unreleased	Unreleased	Jun 5, 2006
MLB Slugfest: Loaded	Point of View	Midway Sports	Unreleased	Unreleased	Jun 21, 2004
Mojo!	FarSight Technologies	Crave Entertainment	Mar 26, 2004	Unreleased	Aug 26, 2003
Monopoly Party	Runecraft	Infogrames	Nov 29, 2002	Unreleased	Oct 29, 2002
Monster 4x4: World Circuit	Ubisoft Barcelona	Ubisoft	Unreleased	Unreleased	Mar 23, 2006
Monster Garage	Impulse Games	Activision	Unreleased	Unreleased	Nov 3, 2004
Mortal Kombat: Armageddon	Midway Games	Midway	Unreleased	Unreleased	Oct 16, 2006
Mortal Kombat: Deadly Alliance	Midway Games	Midway	Feb 14, 2003	Unreleased	Nov 22, 2002
Mortal Kombat: Deception	Midway Games	Midway	Nov 19, 2004	Unreleased	Oct 4, 2004
Mortal Kombat: Shaolin Monks	Midway Studios Los Angeles	Midway	Sep 30, 2005	Unreleased	Sep 19, 2005
Motocross Mania 3	Deibus Studios	Global Star Software^{PAL} 2K Games^{NA}	Apr 22, 2005	Unreleased	Apr 27, 2005
MotoGP: Ultimate Racing Technology	Climax Brighton	THQ	May 24, 2002	Unreleased	May 20, 2002
MotoGP: Ultimate Racing Technology 2	Climax Brighton	THQ	May 15, 2003	Jul 17, 2003	May 21, 2003
MotoGP: Ultimate Racing Technology 3	Climax Racing	THQ	Sep 2, 2005	Unreleased	Aug 30, 2005
MTV Music Generator 3	Mixmax	Codemasters	Jun 18, 2004	Unreleased	Jun 22, 2004
MTX Mototrax	Left Field Productions	Activision	Mar 26, 2004	Unreleased	Mar 2, 2004
Murakumo: Renegade Mech Pursuit	FromSoftware	FromSoftware^{JP} Ubi Soft^{NA}	Unreleased	Jul 25, 2002	Mar 6, 2003
Muzzle Flash	Beyond Interactive	Victor Interactive Software	Unreleased	Feb 27, 2003	Unreleased
MVP 06: NCAA Baseball	EA Canada	EA Sports	Unreleased	Unreleased	Jan 17, 2006
MVP Baseball 2003	EA Canada	EA Sports	Unreleased	Unreleased	Mar 10, 2003
MVP Baseball 2004	EA Canada	EA Sports	Unreleased	Unreleased	Mar 9, 2004
MVP Baseball 2005	EA Canada	EA Sports	Unreleased	Unreleased	Feb 22, 2005
MX 2002 featuring Ricky Carmichael	Pacific Coast Power & Light	THQ	Apr 26, 2002	Unreleased	Dec 3, 2001
MX Superfly	Pacific Coast Power & Light	THQ	Mar 21, 2003	Unreleased	Nov 20, 2002
MX Unleashed	Rainbow Studios	THQ	Mar 26, 2004	Unreleased	Feb 17, 2004
MX vs. ATV Unleashed	Rainbow Studios	THQ	Jun 24, 2005	Unreleased	Mar 24, 2005
MX World Tour Featuring Jamie Little	Impulse Games	Crave Entertainment	Unreleased	Unreleased	Apr 5, 2005
Myst III: Exile	Presto Studios	Ubi Soft^{WW} MediaQuest^{JP}	Oct 4, 2002	May 2, 2002	Sep 19, 2002
Myst IV: Revelation	Ubisoft Montreal	Ubisoft	Unreleased	Unreleased	Mar 28, 2005
N.U.D.E.@ Natural Ultimate Digital Experiment	Red Entertainment	Microsoft Game Studios	Unreleased	Apr 24, 2003	Unreleased
Nakajima Tetsuya no Othello Seminar	Success	Success	Unreleased	Jun 13, 2002	Unreleased
Namco Museum	Mass Media	Namco	Unreleased	Unreleased	Oct 9, 2002
Namco Museum 50th Anniversary	Digital Eclipse	Namco	Jan 31, 2006^{AUS} Mar 31, 2006^{EU}	Unreleased	Aug 30, 2005
Narc	Point of View	Midway	May 20, 2005	Unreleased	Mar 21, 2005
NASCAR 06: Total Team Control	EA Tiburon	EA Sports	Oct 21, 2005	Unreleased	Aug 30, 2005
NASCAR 07	EA Tiburon	EA Sports	Unreleased	Unreleased	Sep 8, 2006
NASCAR 2005: Chase for the Cup	EA Tiburon	EA Sports	Unreleased	Unreleased	Aug 31, 2004
NASCAR Heat 2002	Monster Games	Infogrames	Unreleased	Unreleased	Nov 15, 2001
NASCAR Thunder 2002	EA Tiburon	EA Sports	Unreleased	Unreleased	Nov 15, 2001
NASCAR Thunder 2003	EA Tiburon	EA Sports	Unreleased	Unreleased	Sep 18, 2002
NASCAR Thunder 2004	EA Tiburon	EA Sports	Unreleased	Unreleased	Sep 16, 2003
NBA 2K2	Visual Concepts	Sega	Unreleased	Unreleased	Feb 26, 2002
NBA 2K3	Visual Concepts	Sega	Apr 17, 2003	Unreleased	Oct 7, 2002
NBA 2K6	Visual Concepts	2K Sports	Mar 10, 2006	Unreleased	Sep 27, 2005
NBA 2K7	Visual Concepts	2K Sports	Oct 20, 2006^{AUS} Oct 27, 2006^{EU}	Unreleased	Sep 26, 2006
NBA Ballers	Midway Games	Midway Sports	Unreleased	Unreleased	Apr 5, 2004
NBA Ballers: Phenom	Midway Games	Midway	Unreleased	Unreleased	Mar 31, 2006
NBA Inside Drive 2002	High Voltage Software	Microsoft Game Studios	May 17, 2002	Unreleased	Jan 21, 2002
NBA Inside Drive 2003	High Voltage Software	Microsoft Game Studios	Dec 6, 2002	Unreleased	Oct 15, 2002
NBA Inside Drive 2004	High Voltage Software	Microsoft Game Studios	Nov 28, 2003	Jan 22, 2004	Nov 18, 2003
NBA Jam	Acclaim Studios Austin	Acclaim Entertainment	Nov 7, 2003	Unreleased	Sep 23, 2003
NBA Live 06	EA Canada	EA Sports	Oct 7, 2005^{EU} Oct 10, 2005^{AUS}	Unreleased	Sep 26, 2005
NBA Live 07	EA Canada	EA Sports	Oct 6, 2006^{EU} Oct 12, 2006^{AUS}	Unreleased	Sep 25, 2006
NBA Live 2002	EA Canada	EA Sports	Mar 14, 2002	Mar 7, 2002	Nov 15, 2001
NBA Live 2003	EA Canada	EA Sports	Nov 27, 2002^{AUS} Nov 29, 2002^{EU}	Unreleased	Oct 8, 2002
NBA Live 2004	EA Canada	EA Sports	Nov 7, 2003	Unreleased	Oct 14, 2003
NBA Live 2005	EA Canada	EA Sports	Oct 26, 2004^{AUS} Oct 29, 2004^{EU}	Unreleased	Sep 28, 2004
NBA Starting Five	Konami Computer Entertainment Osaka	Konami	Unreleased	Unreleased	Oct 9, 2002
NBA Street V3	EA Canada	EA Sports BIG	Feb 18, 2005	Unreleased	Feb 8, 2005
NBA Street Vol. 2	NuFX; EA Canada	EA Sports BIG	May 2, 2003	Unreleased	Apr 29, 2003
NCAA College Basketball 2K3	Kush Games; Visual Concepts	Sega	Unreleased	Unreleased	Dec 10, 2002
NCAA College Football 2K3	Visual Concepts; Avalanche Software	Sega	Unreleased	Unreleased	Aug 13, 2002
NCAA Football 06	EA Tiburon	EA Sports	Unreleased	Unreleased	Jul 12, 2005
NCAA Football 07	EA Tiburon	EA Sports	Unreleased	Unreleased	Jul 18, 2006
NCAA Football 08	EA Tiburon	EA Sports	Unreleased	Unreleased	Jul 17, 2007
NCAA Football 2003	EA Tiburon	EA Sports	Unreleased	Unreleased	Jul 22, 2002
NCAA Football 2004	EA Tiburon	EA Sports	Unreleased	Unreleased	Jul 15, 2003
NCAA Football 2005	EA Tiburon	EA Sports	Unreleased	Unreleased	Jul 14, 2004
NCAA March Madness 06	EA Canada	EA Sports	Unreleased	Unreleased	Oct 12, 2005
NCAA March Madness 2004	EA Canada	EA Sports	Unreleased	Unreleased	Nov 17, 2003
NCAA March Madness 2005	EA Canada	EA Sports	Unreleased	Unreleased	Nov 16, 2004
Need for Speed: Carbon	EA Black Box	Electronic Arts	Nov 3, 2006^{EU} Nov 9, 2006^{AUS}	Unreleased	Oct 31, 2006
Need for Speed: Hot Pursuit 2	EA Seattle	EA Games	Oct 24, 2002^{AUS} Oct 25, 2002^{EU}	Unreleased	Oct 1, 2002
Need for Speed: Most Wanted	EA Canada; EA Black Box	Electronic Arts	Nov 25, 2005^{EU} Nov 28, 2005^{AUS}	Unreleased	Nov 15, 2005
Need for Speed: Underground	EA Black Box	EA Games	Nov 21, 2003	Unreleased	Nov 17, 2003
Need for Speed: Underground 2	EA Black Box	EA Games	Nov 16, 2004^{AUS} Nov 19, 2004^{EU}	Unreleased	Nov 15, 2004
Neighbours from Hell	JoWooD Vienna	JoWooD Productions	Mar 4, 2005	Unreleased	Unreleased
New Legends	Infinite Machine	THQ	May 17, 2002	Unreleased	Feb 19, 2002
NFL 2K2	Visual Concepts	Sega	Unreleased	Unreleased	Jan 9, 2002
NFL 2K3	Visual Concepts	Sega	Apr 17, 2003	Unreleased	Aug 13, 2002
NFL Blitz 2002	Point of View	Midway	Unreleased	Unreleased	Mar 18, 2002
NFL Blitz 2003	Point of View	Midway Sports	Unreleased	Unreleased	Aug 12, 2002
NFL Blitz Pro	Midway Games	Midway Sports	Unreleased	Unreleased	Nov 4, 2003
NFL Fever 2002	Microsoft Game Studios	Microsoft Game Studios	Unreleased	Unreleased	Nov 15, 2001
NFL Fever 2003	Microsoft Game Studios	Microsoft Game Studios	Nov 1, 2002	Unreleased	Aug 6, 2002
NFL Fever 2004	Microsoft Game Studios	Microsoft Game Studios	Sep 19, 2003	Sep 19, 2003	Aug 28, 2003
NFL Head Coach	EA Tiburon	EA Sports	Unreleased	Unreleased	Jun 20, 2006
NFL Street	EA Tiburon	EA Sports BIG	Jan 30, 2004	Unreleased	Jan 13, 2004
NFL Street 2	EA Tiburon	EA Sports BIG	Jan 28, 2005	Unreleased	Dec 26, 2004
NHL 06	EA Canada	EA Sports	Sep 16, 2005	Unreleased	Sep 6, 2005
NHL 07	EA Montreal	EA Sports	Sep 21, 2006^{AUS} Sep 22, 2006^{EU}	Unreleased	Sep 12, 2006
NHL 2002	EA Canada	EA Sports	Mar 14, 2002	Unreleased	Dec 11, 2001
NHL 2003	EA Canada	EA Sports	Oct 25, 2002^{EU} Nov 1, 2002^{AUS}	Unreleased	Oct 8, 2002
NHL 2004	EA Black Box	EA Sports	Oct 3, 2003^{EU} Oct 10, 2003^{AUS}	Unreleased	Sep 23, 2003
NHL 2005	EA Black Box	EA Sports	Sep 17, 2004^{AUS} Sep 24, 2004^{EU}	Unreleased	Sep 22, 2004
NHL 2K3	Treyarch	Sega	Mar 28, 2003	Unreleased	Nov 19, 2002
NHL 2K6	Kush Games	2K Sports	Jan 20, 2006^{AUS} Mar 10, 2006^{EU}	Unreleased	Sep 6, 2005
NHL 2K7	Kush Games	2K Sports	Unreleased	Unreleased	Sep 12, 2006
NHL Hitz 2002	Black Box Games	Midway	Mar 14, 2002	Unreleased	Nov 15, 2001
NHL Hitz 2003	Black Box Games	Midway Sports	Nov 1, 2002	Unreleased	Sep 16, 2002
NHL Hitz Pro	Next Level Games	Midway Sports	Nov 14, 2003	Unreleased	Sep 25, 2003
NHL Rivals 2004	Microsoft Game Studios	Microsoft Game Studios	Dec 27, 2003	Unreleased	Nov 18, 2003
Nickelodeon Party Blast	Data Design Interactive	Infogrames	Dec 6, 2002	Unreleased	Oct 29, 2002
NightCaster: Defeat the Darkness	VR1 Entertainment	Microsoft Game Studios	May 31, 2002	Unreleased	Jan 22, 2002
NightCaster II: Equinox	Jaleco Entertainment	Jaleco Entertainment	Jun 6, 2003	Unreleased	Dec 10, 2002
The Nightmare Before Christmas: Oogie's Revenge	Tose	Capcom^{PAL} Buena Vista Games^{NA}	Sep 30, 2005	Unreleased	Oct 10, 2005
Ninja Gaiden	Team Ninja	Tecmo	May 14, 2004^{EU} May 28, 2004^{AUS}	Mar 11, 2004	Mar 2, 2004
Ninja Gaiden Black	Team Ninja	Tecmo	Oct 21, 2005	Sep 29, 2005	Sep 20, 2005
Nobunaga no Yabō: Ranseiki	Koei	Koei	Unreleased	Feb 22, 2002	Unreleased
Obscure	Hydravision Entertainment	MC2-Microïds^{PAL} DreamCatcher Interactive^{NA}	Sep 30, 2004^{AUS} Oct 1, 2004^{EU}	Unreleased	Apr 6, 2005
Oddworld: Munch's Oddysee	Oddworld Inhabitants	Microsoft Game Studios	Mar 14, 2002	Unreleased	Nov 15, 2001
Oddworld: Stranger's Wrath	Oddworld Inhabitants	EA Games	Mar 3, 2005^{EU} Mar 5, 2005^{AUS}	Unreleased	Jan 25, 2005
Open Season	Ubisoft Montreal; Ubisoft Quebec	Ubisoft	Oct 6, 2006^{EU} Nov 30, 2006^{AUS}	Unreleased	Sep 18, 2006
Operation Flashpoint: Elite	Bohemia Interactive	Codemasters	Oct 28, 2005	Unreleased	Nov 8, 2005
Otogi: Myth of Demons	FromSoftware	FromSoftware^{JP} Sega^{WW}	Sep 5, 2003	Dec 12, 2002	Aug 26, 2003
Otogi 2: Immortal Warriors	FromSoftware	FromSoftware^{JP} Sega^{WW}	Feb 11, 2004	Dec 25, 2003	Oct 19, 2004
Outlaw Golf	Hypnotix	Simon & Schuster Interactive^{NA} TDK Mediactive Europe^{PAL} Microsoft^{JP}	Nov 29, 2002	Oct 23, 2003	Jun 11, 2002
Outlaw Golf 2	Hypnotix	Global Star Software	Feb 4, 2005	Unreleased	Oct 21, 2004
Outlaw Golf: 9 Holes of X-Mas	Hypnotix	Simon & Schuster Interactive	Unreleased	Unreleased	Dec 23, 2002
Outlaw Golf: 9 More Holes of X-Mas	Hypnotix	Simon & Schuster Interactive	Unreleased	Unreleased	Nov 15, 2003
Outlaw Tennis	Hypnotix	Global Star Software	Jul 29, 2005	Unreleased	Jul 26, 2005
Outlaw Volleyball	Hypnotix	Simon & Schuster Interactive^{NA} Microsoft^{JP} TDK Mediactive Europe^{PAL}	Nov 14, 2003	Oct 23, 2003	Jul 8, 2003
Outlaw Volleyball: Red Hot	Hypnotix	Simon & Schuster Interactive	Unreleased	Unreleased	Oct 1, 2003
OutRun 2	Sumo Digital	Microsoft Game Studios	Oct 1, 2004^{EU} Oct 15, 2004^{AUS}	Jan 25, 2005	Oct 25, 2004
OutRun 2006: Coast 2 Coast	Sumo Digital	Sega	Mar 31, 2006^{EU} Apr 6, 2006^{AUS}	Unreleased	Apr 25, 2006
Over the Hedge	Edge of Reality	Activision	Jun 8, 2006^{EU} Jun 14, 2006^{AUS}	Unreleased	May 9, 2006
Pac-Man World 2	Namco Hometek	Namco	Unreleased	Unreleased	Oct 15, 2002
Pac-Man World 3	Blitz Games	Namco^{NA} Electronic Arts^{PAL}	Feb 6, 2006^{AUS} May 5, 2006^{EU}	Unreleased	Nov 15, 2005
Painkiller: Hell Wars	People Can Fly	DreamCatcher Interactive	Jul 25, 2006	Unreleased	Jul 25, 2006
Panzer Dragoon Orta	Smilebit	Sega	Mar 21, 2003	Dec 19, 2002	Jan 14, 2003
Panzer Elite Action: Fields of Glory	ZootFly	JoWooD Productions	Aug 11, 2006	Unreleased	Unreleased
Pariah	Digital Extremes	Groove Games^{NA} Hip Games^{PAL}	May 6, 2005^{EU} May 25, 2005^{AUS}	Unreleased	May 3, 2005
Peter Jackson's King Kong	Ubisoft Montpellier	Ubisoft	Nov 17, 2005	Unreleased	Nov 22, 2005
Petit Copter	AquaSystem	AquaSystem	Unreleased	May 30, 2002	Unreleased
Phantasy Star Online Episode I & II	Sonic Team	Sega	May 23, 2003	Jan 16, 2003	Apr 15, 2003
Phantom Crash	Genki	Genki^{JP} Phantagram^{WW}	Nov 22, 2002	Jun 20, 2002	Nov 4, 2002
Phantom Dust	Microsoft Game Studios Japan	Microsoft^{JP} Majesco^{NA}	Unreleased	Sep 23, 2004	Mar 15, 2005
Pilot Down: Behind Enemy Lines	Wide Games	Oxygen Interactive	Sep 9, 2005	Unreleased	Unreleased
Pinball Hall of Fame	FarSight Studios	Crave Entertainment	Unreleased	Unreleased	Nov 18, 2004
Pirates of the Caribbean	Akella	Bethesda Softworks^{NA} Ubi Soft^{PAL}	Sep 5, 2003	Unreleased	Jul 8, 2003
Pirates: The Legend of Black Kat	Westwood Studios	Electronic Arts	Apr 19, 2002	Unreleased	Mar 26, 2002
Pitfall: The Lost Expedition	Edge of Reality	Activision	Feb 20, 2004^{EU} Feb 23, 2004^{AUS}	Unreleased	Feb 17, 2004
Playboy: The Mansion	Cyberlore Studios	Arush Entertainment / Groove Games^{NA} Ubisoft^{PAL}	Mar 4, 2005	Unreleased	Jan 25, 2005
Plus Plumb 2	Takuyo	Takuyo	Unreleased	Jan 15, 2004	Unreleased
PocketBike Racer	Blitz Games	King Games	Unreleased	Unreleased	Nov 19, 2006
Pool Shark 2	Blade Interactive	Zoo Digital Publishing	Nov 19, 2004	Unreleased	Unreleased
Powerdrome	Argonaut Sheffield	Mud Duck Productions^{NA} Evolved Games^{PAL}	Oct 14, 2004^{AUS} Oct 29, 2004^{EU}	Unreleased	Jun 15, 2004
Predator: Concrete Jungle	Eurocom	Vivendi Universal Games	Apr 15, 2005	Unreleased	Apr 27, 2005
Prince of Persia: The Sands of Time	Ubisoft Montreal	Ubisoft	Feb 20, 2004	Unreleased	Nov 11, 2003
Prince of Persia: The Two Thrones	Ubisoft Montreal; Ubisoft Casablanca	Ubisoft	Dec 9, 2005	Unreleased	Dec 1, 2005
Prince of Persia: Warrior Within	Ubisoft Montreal	Ubisoft	Dec 3, 2004	Oct 13, 2005	Dec 2, 2004
Prisoner of War	Wide Games	Codemasters	Jul 19, 2002	Unreleased	Aug 20, 2002
Pro Cast Sports Fishing	Capcom Production Studio 3	Capcom	Sep 26, 2003	Jul 17, 2003	Aug 27, 2003
Pro Evolution Soccer 4 World Soccer: Winning Eleven 8 International (NA)	Konami Computer Entertainment Tokyo	Konami	Nov 26, 2004^{EU} Dec 3, 2004^{AUS}	Unreleased	Feb 1, 2005
Pro Evolution Soccer 5 World Soccer: Winning Eleven 9 (NA)	Konami Computer Entertainment Tokyo	Konami	Oct 21, 2005	Unreleased	Feb 7, 2006
Pro Fishing Challenge	Opus Corp.	Atlus	Unreleased	Unreleased	Aug 31, 2004
Project Gotham Racing	Bizarre Creations	Microsoft Game Studios	Mar 14, 2002	Feb 22, 2002	Nov 15, 2001
Project Gotham Racing 2	Bizarre Creations	Microsoft Game Studios	Nov 28, 2003	Nov 20, 2003	Nov 18, 2003
Project Snowblind	Nixxes Software	Eidos Interactive	Mar 11, 2005	Unreleased	Feb 22, 2005
ProStroke Golf: World Tour 2007	Gusto Games	Oxygen Interactive	Aug 18, 2006	Unreleased	Sep 12, 2006
Psi-Ops: The Mindgate Conspiracy	Midway Games	Midway	Oct 1, 2004	Unreleased	Jun 14, 2004
Psychonauts	Double Fine Productions	Majesco	Feb 10, 2006	Unreleased	Apr 19, 2005
Psyvariar 2	SKONEC	Success	Unreleased	Oct 28, 2004	Unreleased
Pulse Racer	Jaleco Entertainment	Jaleco Entertainment	Unreleased	Unreleased	Dec 10, 2002
Pump It Up: Exceed	Andamiro	Mastiff	Unreleased	Unreleased	Aug 31, 2005
The Punisher	Volition	THQ	Mar 4, 2005	Unreleased	Jan 18, 2005
Pure Pinball	Iridon Interactive	XS Games	Unreleased	Unreleased	Aug 5, 2004
Puyo Pop: Fever	Sonic Team	Sega	Feb 27, 2004	Apr 24, 2004	Unreleased
Quantum Redshift	Curly Monsters	Microsoft Game Studios	Oct 4, 2002	Nov 21, 2002	Sep 17, 2002
R: Racing Evolution R: Racing (PAL)	Namco	Namco	Mar 26, 2004	Nov 27, 2003	Dec 9, 2003
RalliSport Challenge	Digital Illusions CE	Microsoft Game Studios	Mar 14, 2002	Jun 13, 2002	Mar 7, 2002
RalliSport Challenge 2	Digital Illusions CE	Microsoft Game Studios	May 21, 2004	Jun 10, 2004	May 4, 2004
Rally Fusion: Race of Champions	Climax Brighton	Activision	Nov 22, 2002	Unreleased	Dec 12, 2002
Rapala Pro Fishing	Fun Labs	Activision	Aug 4, 2005	May 5, 2005	Aug 31, 2004
Ratatouille	Asobo Studio	THQ	Unreleased	Unreleased	Jun 26, 2007
Rayman 3: Hoodlum Havoc	Ubi Pictures	Ubi Soft	Mar 14, 2003	Unreleased	Mar 18, 2003
Rayman Arena	Ubi Pictures; Ubi Soft Milan	Ubi Soft	Unreleased	Unreleased	Oct 1, 2002
Raze's Hell	Artech Studios	Majesco	Feb 17, 2006	Unreleased	Apr 21, 2005
Real World Golf	In2Games	Mad Catz	Unreleased	Unreleased	Apr 11, 2006
Red Dead Revolver	Rockstar San Diego	Rockstar Games	Jun 11, 2004	May 26, 2005	May 4, 2004
Red Faction II	Outrage Games	THQ	Jun 6, 2003	Unreleased	Apr 1, 2003
Red Ninja: End of Honor	Tranji Studios	Vivendi Universal Games	Apr 1, 2005	Unreleased	Mar 29, 2005
RedCard 2003	Point of View	Midway Sports	Jul 12, 2002	Unreleased	Jun 25, 2002
Reign of Fire	Kuju London	BAM! Entertainment	Nov 15, 2002	Unreleased	Oct 22, 2002
Rent-A-Hero No. 1	Aspect	Sega	Unreleased	Sep 4, 2003	Unreleased
Reservoir Dogs	Volatile Games	Eidos Interactive	Aug 25, 2006	Unreleased	Oct 24, 2006
Return to Castle Wolfenstein: Tides of War	Nerve Software	Activision	May 15, 2003	Dec 25, 2003	May 6, 2003
Richard Burns Rally	Warthog Games	SCi Games	Jul 9, 2004^{EU} Jul 16, 2004^{AUS}	Unreleased	Unreleased
RoadKill	Terminal Reality	Midway	Nov 21, 2003	Unreleased	Oct 13, 2003
Robin Hood: Defender of the Crown	Atomic Planet Entertainment	Capcom	Nov 28, 2003	Unreleased	Nov 11, 2003
RoboCop	Titus Interactive Studio	Titus Interactive	Dec 12, 2003	Unreleased	Jul 29, 2003
Robotech: Battlecry	Vicious Cycle Software	TDK Mediactive	Dec 16, 2002^{AUS} Feb 14, 2003^{EU}	Unreleased	Sep 23, 2002
Robotech: Invasion	Vicious Cycle Software	Global Star Software	Nov 19, 2004^{AUS} Jan 19, 2005^{EU}	Unreleased	Oct 5, 2004
Robots	Eurocom	Vivendi Universal Games	Mar 11, 2005	Unreleased	Feb 22, 2005
Robot Wars: Extreme Destruction	Climax Development	Gamezlab	Nov 22, 2002	Unreleased	Unreleased
Rocky	Rage Newcastle	Rage Software^{PAL} Ubi Soft^{NA}	Oct 18, 2002	Unreleased	Nov 12, 2002
Rocky Legends	Venom Games	Ubisoft	Oct 1, 2004^{EU} Oct 7, 2004^{AUS}	Jan 27, 2005	Sep 28, 2004
Rogue Ops	Bits Studios	Kemco	Feb 6, 2004	Feb 26, 2004	Oct 28, 2003
Rogue Trooper	Rebellion Developments	Eidos Interactive	Apr 21, 2006	Unreleased	May 23, 2006
RollerCoaster Tycoon	Frontier Developments	Infogrames	Mar 25, 2003	Unreleased	Mar 25, 2003
Rolling	Rage Software	SCi Games	Oct 24, 2003	Unreleased	Unreleased
Room Zoom	Blade Interactive	Jaleco Entertainment	Jul 14, 2004	Unreleased	Jul 14, 2004
Rugby 06	EA Canada; HB Studios	EA Sports	Feb 10, 2006	Unreleased	Feb 14, 2006
Rugby 2005	EA Canada	EA Sports	Mar 18, 2005	Unreleased	Mar 11, 2005
Rugby Challenge 2006	Swordfish Studios	Ubisoft	Feb 3, 2006	Unreleased	Unreleased
Rugby League	Sidhe Interactive	Tru Blu Entertainment	Dec 12, 2003^{AUS} Dec 19, 2003^{EU}	Unreleased	Unreleased
Rugby League 2	Sidhe Interactive	Tru Blu Entertainment	Jun 2006	Unreleased	Unreleased
Run Like Hell	Digital Mayhem	Interplay Entertainment	Jun 18, 2004^{EU} Aug 6, 2004^{AUS}	Unreleased	Apr 8, 2003
Samurai Shodown V	Yuki Enterprise	SNK Playmore	Unreleased	Unreleased	Jan 18, 2006
Samurai Warriors	Omega Force	Koei	Sep 24, 2004	Jul 29, 2004	Jul 13, 2004
Scaler	Artificial Mind and Movement	Global Star Software	Oct 29, 2004^{AUS} Nov 26, 2004^{EU}	Unreleased	Oct 20, 2004
Scarface: The World Is Yours	Radical Entertainment	Vivendi Games	Oct 13, 2006	Unreleased	Oct 10, 2006
SCAR: Squadra Corse Alfa Romeo	Milestone srl	Black Bean Games	Jun 24, 2005	Unreleased	Unreleased
Scooby-Doo! Mystery Mayhem	Artificial Mind and Movement	THQ	Mar 26, 2004	Unreleased	Mar 2, 2004
Scooby-Doo! Night of 100 Frights	Heavy Iron Studios	THQ	Unreleased	Unreleased	Aug 26, 2003
Scooby-Doo! Unmasked	Artificial Mind and Movement	THQ	Sep 16, 2005	Unreleased	Sep 12, 2005
Scrapland	MercurySteam	Enlight Software^{NA} Deep Silver^{PAL}	Mar 18, 2005^{EU} Apr 7, 2005^{AUS}	Unreleased	Mar 7, 2005
SeaBlade	Vision Scape Interactive	Simon & Schuster Interactive^{NA} TDK Mediactive Europe^{PAL}	Mar 28, 2003	Unreleased	Nov 20, 2002
Second Sight	Free Radical Design	Codemasters	Sep 3, 2004	Unreleased	Sep 21, 2004
Secret Weapons Over Normandy	Totally Games	LucasArts	Nov 28, 2003	Unreleased	Nov 18, 2003
Sega GT 2002	Wow Entertainment	Sega	Nov 8, 2002	Sep 12, 2002	Sep 3, 2002
Sega GT Online	Wow Entertainment	Sega	Feb 6, 2004	Dec 25, 2003	Jan 27, 2004
Sega Soccer Slam	Black Box Games	Sega	Oct 11, 2002	Unreleased	Aug 20, 2002
Sensible Soccer 2006	Kuju Sheffield	Codemasters	Jun 9, 2006	Unreleased	Unreleased
Sentou Yousei Yukikaze: Yousei no Mau Sora	AquaSystem	AquaSystem	Unreleased	Aug 7, 2003	Unreleased
Serious Sam	Croteam	Gotham Games	Dec 6, 2002	Unreleased	Nov 12, 2002
Serious Sam II	Croteam	2K Games	Oct 14, 2005	Unreleased	Oct 11, 2005
Shadow of Memories	Konami Computer Entertainment Tokyo	Konami	Sep 27, 2002	Unreleased	Unreleased
Shadow Ops: Red Mercury	Zombie Studios	Atari	Jun 18, 2004	Unreleased	Jun 15, 2004
Shadow the Hedgehog	Sega Studios USA	Sega	Nov 18, 2005	Dec 15, 2005	Nov 15, 2005
Shamu's Deep Sea Adventures	Fun Labs	Activision	Feb 1, 2006^{AUS} Mar 17, 2006^{EU}	Unreleased	Nov 1, 2005
Shark Tale	Edge of Reality	Activision	Sep 21, 2004^{AUS} Oct 1, 2004^{EU}	Unreleased	Sep 29, 2004
Shattered Union	PopTop Software	2K Games	Oct 21, 2005	Unreleased	Oct 17, 2005
Shellshock: Nam '67	Guerrilla Games	Eidos Interactive	Sep 3, 2004^{EU} Sep 23, 2004^{AUS}	Unreleased	Sep 14, 2004
Shenmue II	Sega AM2	Microsoft Game Studios	Mar 21, 2003	Unreleased	Oct 29, 2002
Shikigami no Shiro	Alfa System	MediaQuest	Unreleased	Mar 14, 2002	Unreleased
Shikigami no Shiro Evolution	Alfa System	MediaQuest	Unreleased	Dec 19, 2002	Unreleased
Shikigami no Shiro II	Alfa System	Kids Station	Unreleased	Apr 15, 2004	Unreleased
Shinchou Mahjong	Success	e frontier	Unreleased	Apr 24, 2003	Unreleased
Shin Megami Tensei: Nine	Atlus; NexTech	Atlus	Unreleased	Dec 5, 2002	Unreleased
Showdown: Legends of Wrestling	Acclaim Studios Austin	Acclaim Entertainment	Jul 2, 2004	Unreleased	Jun 24, 2004
Shrek	Digital Illusions Canada	TDK Mediactive	Mar 27, 2002^{EU} Mar 29, 2002^{UK}	Unreleased	Nov 15, 2001
Shrek 2	Luxoflux	Activision	Jun 18, 2004	Dec 16, 2004	May 4, 2004
Shrek Super Party	Mass Media	TDK Mediactive	Nov 29, 2002	Unreleased	Nov 14, 2002
Shrek SuperSlam	Shaba Games	Activision	Nov 18, 2005	Unreleased	Oct 25, 2005
Sid Meier's Pirates!	Firaxis Games	2K Games	Jul 22, 2005^{EU} Jul 29, 2005^{AUS}	Unreleased	Jul 11, 2005
Silent Hill 2	Team Silent	Konami	Oct 4, 2002	Feb 22, 2002	Dec 18, 2001
Silent Hill 4: The Room	Konami Software Shanghai	Konami	Sep 17, 2004	Unreleased	Sep 7, 2004
Silent Scope Complete	Konami	Konami	Mar 19, 2004	Unreleased	Feb 10, 2004
The Simpsons: Hit & Run	Radical Entertainment	Vivendi Universal Games	Oct 31, 2003	Dec 25, 2003	Sep 16, 2003
The Simpsons: Road Rage	Radical Entertainment	Electronic Arts	Mar 22, 2002	Unreleased	Dec 1, 2001
The Sims	Edge of Reality	EA Games	Apr 4, 2003	Unreleased	Mar 25, 2003
The Sims 2	Maxis	Electronic Arts	Nov 2, 2005^{AUS} Nov 4, 2005^{EU}	Unreleased	Oct 25, 2005
The Sims Bustin' Out	Maxis	EA Games	Dec 19, 2003^{EU} Feb 27, 2004^{AUS}	Unreleased	Dec 16, 2003
Ski Racing 2005	ColdWood Interactive	JoWooD Productions	Mar 24, 2005	Unreleased	Unreleased
Ski Racing 2006	ColdWood Interactive	JoWooD Productions	Nov 25, 2005	Unreleased	Unreleased
Slam Tennis	Infogrames Sheffield House	Infogrames	Aug 23, 2002	Unreleased	Unreleased
Smashing Drive	Point of View	Namco	Unreleased	Unreleased	May 13, 2002
Sneak King	Blitz Games	King Games	Unreleased	Unreleased	Nov 19, 2006
Sneakers Nezmix (JP)	Media.Vision	Microsoft Game Studios	Unreleased	Feb 22, 2002	Oct 22, 2002
Sniper Elite	Rebellion Developments	MC2 France^{PAL} Namco Hometek^{NA}	Oct 6, 2005^{AUS} Oct 7, 2005^{EU}	Unreleased	Oct 18, 2005
SNK vs. Capcom: SVC Chaos	SNK Playmore	SNK Playmore^{JP/NA} Ignition Entertainment^{PAL}	Mar 18, 2005^{EU} May 13, 2005^{AUS}	Oct 7, 2004	Sep 28, 2004
Soldier of Fortune II: Double Helix	Gratuitous Games	Activision	Jun 20, 2003^{EU} Jul 3, 2003^{AUS}	Unreleased	Jun 24, 2003
Sonic Heroes	Sonic Team USA	Sega	Feb 2, 2004	Dec 4, 2003	Jan 27, 2004
Sonic Mega Collection Plus	Sonic Team	Sega	Feb 4, 2005^{EU} Mar 20, 2005^{AUS}	Dec 9, 2004	Nov 2, 2004
Sonic Riders	Sonic Team; Now Production	Sega	Mar 17, 2006^{EU} Mar 30, 2006^{AUS}	Feb 23, 2006	Feb 21, 2006
Soulcalibur II	Project Soul	Namco	Sep 26, 2003	Mar 27, 2003	Aug 26, 2003
Spartan: Total Warrior	Creative Assembly	Sega	Oct 7, 2005^{EU} Oct 14, 2005^{AUS}	Unreleased	Oct 25, 2005
Spawn: Armageddon	Point of View	Namco	Mar 12, 2004	Unreleased	Nov 21, 2003
Special Forces: Nemesis Strike Counter Terrorist Special Forces: Fire for Effect (PAL)	Asobo Studio	Hip Games	Apr 1, 2005	Unreleased	Mar 22, 2005
Speed Kings	Climax London	Acclaim Entertainment	Jul 4, 2003	Unreleased	Jun 3, 2003
Sphinx and the Cursed Mummy	Eurocom	THQ	Feb 20, 2004	Unreleased	Nov 10, 2003
Spider-Man	Treyarch	Activision^{WW} Capcom^{JP}	Jun 7, 2002	Feb 13, 2003	Apr 16, 2002
Spider-Man 2	Treyarch	Activision	Jul 2, 2004^{AUS} Jul 9, 2004^{EU}	Unreleased	Jun 29, 2004
Spikeout: Battle Street	Dimps	Sega	Apr 22, 2005	Mar 24, 2005	Mar 29, 2005
Splashdown	Rainbow Studios	Infogrames	Aug 30, 2002^{EU} Sep 20, 2002^{AUS}	Unreleased	Jun 25, 2002
Splat Magazine Renegade Paintball	Cat Daddy Games	Global Star Software	Apr 7, 2006	Unreleased	Oct 11, 2005
SpongeBob SquarePants: Battle for Bikini Bottom	Heavy Iron Studios	THQ	Nov 28, 2003	Unreleased	Oct 29, 2003
SpongeBob SquarePants: Lights, Camera, Pants!	THQ Studio Australia	THQ	Oct 21, 2005	Unreleased	Oct 19, 2005
The SpongeBob SquarePants Movie	Heavy Iron Studios	THQ	Nov 19, 2004^{AUS} Feb 18, 2005^{EU}	Unreleased	Oct 27, 2004
SpyHunter	Point of View	Midway	Jun 28, 2002	Unreleased	Mar 12, 2002
SpyHunter 2	Angel Studios	Midway	Mar 5, 2004	Unreleased	Nov 24, 2003
SpyHunter: Nowhere to Run	Terminal Reality	Midway	Unreleased	Unreleased	Sep 5, 2006
Spy vs. Spy	Vicious Cycle Software	Global Star Software	Apr 29, 2005	Unreleased	Apr 7, 2005
Spyro: A Hero's Tail	Eurocom	Vivendi Universal Games	Nov 19, 2004	Unreleased	Nov 2, 2004
SSX 3	EA Canada	EA Sports BIG	Oct 31, 2003	Unreleased	Oct 21, 2003
SSX on Tour	EA Canada	EA Sports BIG	Oct 21, 2005	Unreleased	Oct 11, 2005
SSX Tricky	EA Canada	EA Sports BIG	Jun 14, 2002	Apr 4, 2002	Dec 11, 2001
Stacked with Daniel Negreanu	5000 ft	Myelin Media	Unreleased	Unreleased	May 30, 2006
Stake: Fortune Fighters	Gameness Art	Metro3D	Jun 6, 2003	Unreleased	May 5, 2003
Star Trek: Shattered Universe	Starsphere Interactive	TDK Mediactive	Apr 30, 2004	Unreleased	Jan 14, 2004
Star Wars: Battlefront	Pandemic Studios	LucasArts	Sep 22, 2004^{AUS} Sep 23, 2004^{NZ} Sep 24, 2004^{EU}	Oct 7, 2004	Sep 21, 2004
Star Wars: Battlefront II	Pandemic Studios	LucasArts	Oct 28, 2005	Unreleased	Nov 1, 2005
Star Wars: The Clone Wars	Pandemic Studios	LucasArts	May 9, 2003	Unreleased	Apr 22, 2003
Star Wars: Episode III – Revenge of the Sith	The Collective	LucasArts	May 5, 2005	Unreleased	May 5, 2005
Star Wars Jedi Knight II: Jedi Outcast	Vicarious Visions	LucasArts^{NA} Activision^{WW}	Nov 22, 2002	Unreleased	Nov 19, 2002
Star Wars Jedi Knight: Jedi Academy	Vicarious Visions	LucasArts^{NA} Activision^{WW}	Nov 21, 2003^{EU} Dec 4, 2003^{AUS}	Sep 2, 2004	Nov 18, 2003
Star Wars: Jedi Starfighter	LucasArts	LucasArts	May 31, 2002	Unreleased	May 14, 2002
Star Wars: Knights of the Old Republic	BioWare	LucasArts	Sep 12, 2003	Unreleased	Jul 16, 2003
Star Wars Knights of the Old Republic II: The Sith Lords	Obsidian Entertainment	LucasArts	Feb 11, 2005^{EU} Feb 15, 2005^{AUS}	Unreleased	Dec 6, 2004
Star Wars: Obi-Wan	LucasArts	LucasArts	Mar 29, 2002	Unreleased	Dec 19, 2001
Star Wars: Republic Commando	LucasArts	LucasArts	Mar 4, 2005	Feb 17, 2005	Mar 1, 2005
Star Wars: Starfighter Special Edition	Secret Level, Inc.	LucasArts	Unreleased	Unreleased	Nov 15, 2001
Starsky & Hutch	Supersonic Software	Empire Interactive^{PAL} Gotham Games^{NA}	Jun 20, 2003	Unreleased	Sep 9, 2003
State of Emergency	VIS Entertainment	Rockstar Games	Apr 4, 2003	Unreleased	Mar 25, 2003
Steel Battalion	Nude Maker; Capcom Production Studio 4	Capcom	Mar 28, 2003	Sep 12, 2002	Nov 20, 2002
Steel Battalion: Line of Contact	Nude Maker; Capcom Production Studio 4	Capcom	Mar 26, 2004	Feb 26, 2004	Feb 26, 2004
Still Life	Microïds Canada	MC2^{PAL} The Adventure Company^{NA}	Jun 3, 2005	Unreleased	Jun 6, 2005
Stolen	Blue 52	Hip Games	Apr 8, 2005	Unreleased	Apr 22, 2005
Street Fighter Anniversary Collection	Capcom	Capcom	Oct 29, 2004^{EU} Nov 12, 2004^{AUS}	Oct 28, 2004	Feb 22, 2005
Street Hoops	Black Ops Entertainment	Activision	Oct 4, 2002	Unreleased	Aug 13, 2002
Street Racing Syndicate	Eutechnyx	Namco	May 6, 2005^{EU} May 20, 2005^{AUS}	Unreleased	Aug 31, 2004
Strike Force Bowling	LAB Rats Games	Crave Entertainment	Unreleased	Unreleased	May 10, 2004
Stubbs the Zombie in Rebel Without a Pulse	Wideload	Aspyr	Feb 10, 2006	Unreleased	Oct 18, 2005
Sudeki	Climax Studios	Microsoft Game Studios	Aug 27, 2004	Jul 14, 2005	Jul 20, 2004
The Suffering	Surreal Software	Midway	May 14, 2004	Unreleased	Mar 8, 2004
The Suffering: Ties That Bind	Surreal Software	Midway	Oct 28, 2005	Unreleased	Sep 26, 2005
Super Bubble Pop	Runecraft	Jaleco Entertainment	Mar 15, 2003	Unreleased	Dec 25, 2002
Super Monkey Ball Deluxe	Tose	Sega	Aug 26, 2005	Mar 24, 2005	Mar 15, 2005
Superman Returns	EA Tiburon	Electronic Arts; Warner Bros. Interactive Entertainment	Nov 24, 2006^{EU} Nov 30, 2006^{AUS}	Unreleased	Nov 20, 2006
Superman: The Man of Steel	Circus Freak	Infogrames	Dec 13, 2002	Unreleased	Nov 12, 2002
SWAT: Global Strike Team	Argonaut Games	Vivendi Universal Games	Dec 5, 2003	Unreleased	Oct 28, 2003
SX Superstar	Climax Solent	AKA Acclaim	Jul 4, 2003	Unreleased	Jun 30, 2003
Syberia	Microïds	Microïds^{PAL} XS Games^{NA}	Jun 6, 2003	Unreleased	Jul 23, 2003
Syberia II	Microïds Canada	XS Games^{NA} MC2-Microïds^{PAL}	Nov 26, 2004	Unreleased	Oct 12, 2004
Taito Legends	Empire Interactive	Empire Interactive^{PAL} Sega^{NA}	Oct 14, 2005	Unreleased	Oct 25, 2005
Taito Legends 2	Empire Interactive	Empire Interactive	Mar 30, 2006^{AUS} Mar 31, 2006^{EU}	Unreleased	Unreleased
Tak: The Great Juju Challenge	Avalanche Software	THQ	Mar 3, 2006	Unreleased	Sep 19, 2005
Tak 2: The Staff of Dreams	Avalanche Software	THQ	Mar 11, 2005^{AUS} Mar 24, 2005^{EU}	Unreleased	Oct 11, 2004
Takahashi Junko no Mahjong Seminar	Success	Success	Unreleased	Jun 13, 2002	Unreleased
Tao Feng: Fist of the Lotus	Studio Gigante	Microsoft Game Studios	May 9, 2003	Oct 23, 2003	Mar 18, 2003
Taz: Wanted	Blitz Games	Infogrames	Sep 27, 2002^{EU} Oct 18, 2002^{AUS}	Unreleased	Sep 17, 2002
Tecmo Classic Arcade	Tecmo	Tecmo	Oct 21, 2005	Oct 27, 2005	Sep 13, 2005
Teen Titans	Artificial Mind and Movement	THQ; Majesco	Unreleased	Unreleased	Oct 13, 2006
Teenage Mutant Ninja Turtles	Konami Computer Entertainment Studios	Konami	Apr 16, 2004	Unreleased	Oct 21, 2003
Teenage Mutant Ninja Turtles 2: Battle Nexus	Konami Computer Entertainment Studios	Konami	Mar 11, 2005	Unreleased	Oct 19, 2004
Teenage Mutant Ninja Turtles 3: Mutant Nightmare	Konami Computer Entertainment Studios	Konami	Apr 14, 2006	Unreleased	Nov 1, 2005
Tenchu: Return from Darkness	K2	Activision^{WW} FromSoftware^{JP}	Mar 19, 2004^{EU} Mar 30, 2004^{AUS}	May 27, 2004	Mar 9, 2004
Tenerezza	Aquaplus	Aquaplus	Unreleased	Jan 29, 2003	Unreleased
Tennis Masters Series 2003	Microïds Canada	Microïds	Nov 30, 2002	Unreleased	Aug 7, 2003
The Terminator: Dawn of Fate	Paradigm Entertainment	Infogrames	Oct 25, 2002^{EU} Nov 2002^{AUS}	Unreleased	Sep 17, 2002
Terminator 3: Rise of the Machines	Black Ops Entertainment; Shiny Entertainment; Legend Entertainment; Atari Melbourne House	Atari	Nov 28, 2003	Unreleased	Nov 11, 2003
Terminator 3: The Redemption	Paradigm Entertainment	Atari	Sep 17, 2004^{AUS} Sep 24, 2004^{EU}	Unreleased	Sep 9, 2004
Test Drive TD Overdrive: The Brotherhood of Speed (PAL)	Pitbull Syndicate	Infogrames	Jul 5, 2002^{EU} Jul 12, 2002^{AUS}	Unreleased	Jun 11, 2002
Test Drive: Eve of Destruction	Monster Games	Atari	Unreleased	Unreleased	Aug 25, 2004
Test Drive: Off-Road Wide Open Off-Road: Wide Open (PAL)	Angel Studios	Infogrames	May 24, 2002^{EU} May 31, 2002^{AUS}	Unreleased	Nov 15, 2001
Tetris Worlds	Radical Entertainment	THQ^{WW} Success^{JP}	Sep 20, 2002	Nov 14, 2002	Jun 26, 2002
Thief: Deadly Shadows	Ion Storm	Eidos Interactive	Jun 11, 2004	Unreleased	May 25, 2004
The Thing	Computer Artworks	Black Label Games; Konami	Sep 20, 2002	Unreleased	Sep 3, 2002
Thousand Land	FromSoftware	FromSoftware	Unreleased	Mar 20, 2003	Unreleased
Thrillville	Frontier Developments	LucasArts	Unreleased	Unreleased	Nov 21, 2006
Tiger Woods PGA Tour 06	EA Redwood Shores; Hypnos Entertainment	EA Sports	Oct 7, 2005^{EU} Oct 10, 2005^{AUS}	Unreleased	Sep 22, 2005
Tiger Woods PGA Tour 07	EA Redwood Shores	EA Sports	Sep 21, 2006^{AUS} Sep 22, 2006^{EU}	Unreleased	Oct 10, 2006
Tiger Woods PGA Tour 2003	EA Redwood Shores	EA Sports	Nov 22, 2002	Unreleased	Oct 29, 2002
Tiger Woods PGA Tour 2004	EA Redwood Shores	EA Sports	Sep 25, 2003^{AUS} Sep 26, 2003^{EU}	Unreleased	Sep 22, 2003
Tiger Woods PGA Tour 2005	EA Redwood Shores	EA Sports	Sep 17, 2004^{AUS} Sep 24, 2004^{EU}	Unreleased	Sep 21, 2004
TimeSplitters 2	Free Radical Design	Eidos Interactive	Oct 18, 2002^{EU} Nov 4, 2002^{AUS}	Unreleased	Oct 8, 2002
TimeSplitters: Future Perfect	Free Radical Design	EA Games	Mar 24, 2005	Unreleased	Mar 22, 2005
TMNT: Mutant Melee	Konami Computer Entertainment Hawaii	Konami	Unreleased	Unreleased	Mar 15, 2005
TOCA Race Driver V8 Supercars: Race Driver (AUS) Pro Race Driver (NA)	Codemasters	Codemasters	Mar 28, 2003^{EU} Apr 4, 2003^{AUS}	Unreleased	Apr 15, 2003
TOCA Race Driver 2 V8 Supercars 2 (AUS)	Codemasters	Codemasters	Apr 15, 2004^{AUS} Apr 23, 2004^{EU}	Unreleased	Apr 13, 2004
TOCA Race Driver 3 V8 Supercars 3 (AUS)	Codemasters	Codemasters	Feb 23, 2006^{AUS} Feb 24, 2006^{EU}	Unreleased	Feb 21, 2006
ToeJam & Earl III: Mission to Earth	ToeJam & Earl Productions; Visual Concepts	Sega	Mar 7, 2003	Unreleased	Oct 22, 2002
Tom and Jerry in War of the Whiskers	VIS Entertainment	NewKidCo	Unreleased	Unreleased	Nov 25, 2003
Tom Clancy's Ghost Recon	Red Storm Entertainment	Ubi Soft	Dec 6, 2002	Sep 25, 2003	Nov 12, 2002
Tom Clancy's Ghost Recon 2	Red Storm Entertainment	Ubisoft	Nov 25, 2004^{AUS} Nov 26, 2004^{EU}	Unreleased	Nov 16, 2004
Tom Clancy's Ghost Recon 2: Summit Strike	Red Storm Entertainment	Ubisoft	Aug 25, 2005^{AUS} Aug 26, 2005^{EU}	Unreleased	Aug 2, 2005
Tom Clancy's Ghost Recon Advanced Warfighter	Ubisoft Shanghai	Ubisoft	Mar 17, 2006	Unreleased	Mar 7, 2006
Tom Clancy's Ghost Recon: Island Thunder	Red Storm Entertainment	Ubi Soft	Sep 5, 2003	Mar 11, 2004	Aug 5, 2003
Tom Clancy's Rainbow Six 3	Ubisoft Montreal	Ubisoft	Nov 7, 2003	Jul 8, 2004	Oct 28, 2003
Tom Clancy's Rainbow Six 3: Black Arrow	Ubisoft Milan	Ubisoft	Aug 20, 2004	Mar 10, 2005	Aug 5, 2004
Tom Clancy's Rainbow Six: Critical Hour	Ubisoft Quebec	Ubisoft	Unreleased	Unreleased	Mar 14, 2006
Tom Clancy's Rainbow Six: Lockdown	Ubisoft Montreal	Ubisoft	Sep 8, 2005^{PAL} Sep 9, 2005^{UK}	Sep 22, 2005	Sep 8, 2005
Tom Clancy's Splinter Cell	Ubi Soft Montreal	Ubi Soft	Nov 29, 2002	Nov 27, 2003	Nov 18, 2002
Tom Clancy's Splinter Cell: Chaos Theory	Ubisoft Montreal; Ubisoft Milan	Ubisoft	Apr 1, 2005	Nov 17, 2005	Mar 29, 2005
Tom Clancy's Splinter Cell: Double Agent	Ubisoft Montreal	Ubisoft	Oct 26, 2006^{AUS} Oct 27, 2006^{EU}	Unreleased	Oct 24, 2006
Tom Clancy's Splinter Cell: Pandora Tomorrow	Ubisoft Milan; Ubisoft Shanghai	Ubisoft	Mar 26, 2004	Apr 7, 2005	Mar 27, 2004
Tomb Raider: Legend	Nixxes Software	Eidos Interactive	Apr 7, 2006^{EU} Apr 13, 2006^{AUS}	Unreleased	Apr 11, 2006
Tony Hawk's American Wasteland	Neversoft	Activision	Oct 28, 2005	Unreleased	Oct 18, 2005
Tony Hawk's Project 8	Shaba Games	Activision	Nov 15, 2006^{AUS} Nov 17, 2006^{EU}	Unreleased	Nov 7, 2006
Tony Hawk's Pro Skater 2x	Neversoft; Treyarch	Activision O2	Unreleased	Unreleased	Nov 15, 2001
Tony Hawk's Pro Skater 3	Neversoft	Activision O2	Mar 14, 2002	Unreleased	Mar 15, 2002
Tony Hawk's Pro Skater 4	Neversoft	Activision O2	Nov 15, 2002	Unreleased	Oct 23, 2002
Tony Hawk's Underground	Neversoft	Activision	Nov 21, 2003	May 20, 2004	Oct 27, 2003
Tony Hawk's Underground 2	Neversoft	Activision	Oct 8, 2004	Unreleased	Oct 4, 2004
Top Gear RPM Tuning RPM Tuning (PAL)	Babylon Software	Kemco^{NA} MC2 France^{PAL}	Jun 3, 2005	Unreleased	Feb 16, 2005
Top Spin	PAM Development; Indie Games	Microsoft Game Studios	Nov 7, 2003	Jul 15, 2004	Oct 28, 2003
Torino 2006	49Games	2K Sports	Jan 20, 2006^{AUS} Jan 27, 2006^{EU}	Unreleased	Jan 25, 2006
Tork: Prehistoric Punk	Tiwak	Ubisoft	Unreleased	Unreleased	Jan 12, 2005
Total Club Manager 2004	Budcat Creations	EA Sports	Dec 5, 2003	Unreleased	Unreleased
Total Club Manager 2005	Budcat Creations	EA Sports	Oct 29, 2004	Unreleased	Unreleased
Total Immersion Racing	Razorworks	Empire Interactive	Nov 1, 2002	Unreleased	Nov 18, 2002
Total Overdose	Deadline Games	SCi Games	Sep 16, 2005	Unreleased	Sep 27, 2005
Totaled! Crashed (PAL)	Rage Games	Rage Games^{PAL} Majesco^{NA}	Jun 7, 2002	Unreleased	Jul 30, 2002
Touge R	Cave	Atlus	Unreleased	Dec 12, 2002	Unreleased
Tour de France	Konami Computer Entertainment Osaka	Konami	Jul 26, 2002	Unreleased	Unreleased
Toxic Grind	Blue Shift	THQ	Nov 8, 2002	Unreleased	Oct 21, 2002
TransWorld Snowboarding	Housemarque	Infogrames	Nov 8, 2002	Unreleased	Oct 15, 2002
Transworld Surf	Angel Studios	Infogrames	Mar 14, 2002	Unreleased	Nov 15, 2001
Triangle Again	KiKi Co., Ltd.	KiKi Co., Ltd.	Unreleased	Jun 27, 2002	Unreleased
Triangle Again 2	KiKi Co., Ltd.	KiKi Co., Ltd.	Unreleased	Dec 19, 2002	Unreleased
Trigger Man	Point of View	Crave Entertainment	Unreleased	Unreleased	Sep 28, 2004
Triple Play 2002	Pandemic Studios	EA Sports	Unreleased	Unreleased	Mar 18, 2002
Trivial Pursuit: Unhinged	Artech Studios	Atari	Unreleased	Unreleased	Mar 26, 2004
Tron 2.0: Killer App	Climax LA	Buena Vista Interactive	Dec 3, 2004	Unreleased	Nov 3, 2004
True Crime: New York City	Exakt Entertainment	Activision	Nov 25, 2005	Unreleased	Nov 16, 2005
True Crime: Streets of LA	Luxoflux	Activision	Nov 7, 2003	Oct 28, 2004	Nov 4, 2003
Turok: Evolution	Acclaim Studios Austin	Acclaim Entertainment	Sep 6, 2002	Unreleased	Sep 1, 2002
Ty the Tasmanian Tiger	Krome Studios	EA Games	Nov 22, 2002	Unreleased	Oct 9, 2002
Ty the Tasmanian Tiger 2: Bush Rescue	Krome Studios	EA Games	Nov 2, 2004^{AUS} Nov 5, 2004^{EU}	Unreleased	Oct 12, 2004
Ty the Tasmanian Tiger 3: Night of the Quinkan	Krome Studios	Activision	Feb 1, 2006	Unreleased	Oct 12, 2005
UEFA Champions League 2004-2005	EA Sports	EA Sports	Feb 4, 2005	Unreleased	Unreleased
UEFA Euro 2004	EA Canada	EA Sports	May 7, 2004	Unreleased	May 4, 2004
UFC: Tapout	DreamFactory	Crave Entertainment^{NA} Capcom^{JP} Ubi Soft^{PAL}	Sep 20, 2002	Apr 18, 2002	Feb 19, 2002
UFC: Tapout 2	DreamFactory	TDK Mediactive	Unreleased	Unreleased	Mar 20, 2003
Ultimate Beach Soccer Pro Beach Soccer (PAL)	PAM Development	Wanadoo Edition^{PAL} DreamCatcher Interactive^{NA}	Aug 29, 2003	Unreleased	Nov 14, 2003
Ultimate Pro Pinball	Atomic Planet Entertainment	Empire Interactive	Jul 15, 2005	Unreleased	Unreleased
Ultimate Spider-Man	Treyarch	Activision	Oct 12, 2005^{AUS} Oct 14, 2005^{EU}	Unreleased	Sep 22, 2005
Ultra Bust-a-Move Ultra Puzzle Bobble (JP)	Taito	Majesco^{NA} Taito^{JP} 505 Games^{PAL}	May 19, 2006	Jan 27, 2005	Nov 4, 2004
Umezawa Yukari no Igo Seminar	Success	Success	Unreleased	Jun 13, 2002	Unreleased
Unreal Championship	Digital Extremes; Epic Games	Infogrames	Nov 29, 2002	Jan 22, 2004	Nov 12, 2002
Unreal Championship 2: The Liandri Conflict	Epic Games	Midway	Apr 22, 2005	Unreleased	Apr 18, 2005
Unreal II: The Awakening	Tantalus Interactive	Atari	Apr 23, 2004	Unreleased	Feb 10, 2004
Urban Chaos: Riot Response	Rocksteady Studios	Eidos Interactive	May 19, 2006^{EU} May 26, 2006^{AUS}	Unreleased	Jun 13, 2006
The Urbz: Sims in the City	Maxis	EA Games	Nov 9, 2004^{AUS} Nov 12, 2004^{EU}	Unreleased	Nov 9, 2004
V-Rally 3	Eden Studios	Infogrames	Mar 28, 2003^{EU} Apr 11, 2003^{AUS}	Unreleased	Mar 26, 2003
Van Helsing	Saffire	Vivendi Universal Games	May 14, 2004	Unreleased	May 7, 2004
Vexx	Acclaim Studios Austin	Acclaim Entertainment	Apr 4, 2003	Unreleased	Feb 11, 2003
Vietcong: Purple Haze	Coyote Developments	Gathering	Oct 22, 2004	Unreleased	Sep 15, 2004
Virtual Pool: Tournament Edition	Celeris	Global Star Software	Jun 8, 2005	Unreleased	May 11, 2005
Volvo: Drive For Life	Climax Action	Microsoft Game Studios	Unreleased	Unreleased	Aug 18, 2005
Voodoo Vince	Beep Industries	Microsoft Game Studios	Oct 17, 2003	Jun 22, 2004	Sep 23, 2003
Wakeboarding Unleashed Featuring Shaun Murray	Shaba Games	Activision O2	Jun 13, 2003	Dec 25, 2003	Jun 10, 2003
Wallace & Gromit in Project Zoo	Frontier Developments	BAM! Entertainment	Oct 3, 2003	Unreleased	Oct 16, 2003
Wallace & Gromit: The Curse of the Were-Rabbit	Frontier Developments	Konami	Oct 14, 2005	Unreleased	Sep 29, 2005
Warpath	Digital Extremes	Groove Games	Unreleased	Unreleased	Jul 18, 2006
The Warriors	Rockstar Toronto	Rockstar Games	Oct 21, 2005	Unreleased	Oct 17, 2005
Whacked!	Presto Studios	Microsoft Game Studios	Nov 29, 2002	Jan 16, 2003	Oct 15, 2002
Whiplash	Crystal Dynamics; Nixxes Software	Eidos Interactive	Mar 5, 2004	Unreleased	Nov 18, 2003
Whiteout	Vicarious Visions	Konami	Unreleased	Unreleased	Dec 10, 2002
The Wild Rings	Paon	Microsoft Game Studios	Unreleased	Apr 10, 2003	Unreleased
WinBack 2: Project Poseidon Operation WinBack 2: Project Poseidon (PAL)	Cavia	Koei	Jun 16, 2006^{EU} Jun 29, 2006^{AUS}	Unreleased	Apr 25, 2006
Wings of War	Silver Wish Games	Gathering	Jul 30, 2004	Unreleased	Aug 30, 2004
Without Warning	Circle Studio	Capcom	Oct 28, 2005	Unreleased	Nov 1, 2005
World Championship Poker	Coresoft	Crave Entertainment	Unreleased	Unreleased	Nov 30, 2004
World Championship Poker 2: Featuring Howard Lederer	Point of View	Crave Entertainment	Unreleased	Unreleased	Nov 3, 2005
World Championship Pool 2004	Blade Interactive	Jaleco Entertainment	Mar 4, 2005	Unreleased	Dec 8, 2003
World Championship Rugby	Swordfish Studios	Acclaim Entertainment	Apr 8, 2004	Unreleased	Unreleased
World Championship Snooker 2003	Blade Interactive	Codemasters	Jun 20, 2003^{AUS} Jun 27, 2003^{EU}	Unreleased	Unreleased
World Championship Snooker 2004	Blade Interactive	Codemasters	Jun 25, 2004^{EU} Jul 2, 2004^{AUS}	Unreleased	Unreleased
World Poker Tour	Coresoft	2K Sports	Jan 27, 2006^{AUS} Mar 10, 2006^{EU}	Unreleased	Oct 18, 2005
World Racing	Synetic	TDK Mediactive	Feb 28, 2003	Unreleased	Mar 20, 2003
World Racing 2	Synetic	Playlogic Entertainment^{PAL} Evolved Games^{NA}	Nov 25, 2005	Unreleased	Aug 16, 2006
World Series Baseball	Visual Concepts	Sega	Unreleased	Unreleased	May 21, 2002
World Series Baseball 2K3	Visual Concepts	Sega	Unreleased	Unreleased	Mar 11, 2003
World Series of Poker	Left Field Productions	Activision	Feb 1, 2006^{AUS} Feb 24, 2006^{EU}	Unreleased	Aug 31, 2005
World Snooker Championship 2005	Blade Interactive	Sega	Apr 15, 2005	Unreleased	Unreleased
World War II Combat: Iwo Jima	Direct Action Games	Groove Games	Unreleased	Unreleased	Jul 21, 2006
World War II Combat: Road to Berlin	Direct Action Games	Groove Games	Unreleased	Unreleased	Jan 24, 2006
Worms 3D	Team17	Sega	Oct 31, 2003	Unreleased	Mar 1, 2005
Worms 4: Mayhem	Team17	Codemasters^{PAL} Majesco^{NA}	Jul 29, 2005^{EU} Aug 16, 2005^{AUS}	Unreleased	Oct 4, 2005
Worms Forts: Under Siege	Team17	Sega	Nov 19, 2004	Unreleased	Mar 15, 2005
Wrath Unleashed	The Collective	LucasArts	Mar 5, 2004	Unreleased	Feb 10, 2004
Wreckless: The Yakuza Missions Double-S.T.E.A.L. (JP)	Bunkasha	Activision	Mar 14, 2002	Feb 22, 2002	Feb 5, 2002
WTA Tour Tennis Pro Tennis WTA Tour (PAL)	Konami	Konami	Sep 13, 2002	Aug 29, 2002	Sep 24, 2002
WWE Raw 2	Anchor Inc.	THQ	Oct 3, 2003^{AUS} Oct 10, 2003^{EU}	Unreleased	Sep 15, 2003
WWE WrestleMania 21	Studio Gigante	THQ	May 27, 2005	Unreleased	Apr 20, 2005
WWF Raw WWE Raw (WW)	Anchor Inc.	THQ	Sep 27, 2002	Oct 3, 2002	Feb 12, 2002
X-Men Legends	Raven Software	Activision	Oct 22, 2004	Jan 27, 2005	Sep 21, 2004
X-Men Legends II: Rise of Apocalypse	Raven Software	Activision	Oct 12, 2005^{AUS} Oct 14, 2005^{EU}	Unreleased	Sep 20, 2005
X-Men: Next Dimension	Paradox Development	Activision	Nov 22, 2002	Unreleased	Oct 29, 2002
X-Men: The Official Game	Z-Axis	Activision	May 19, 2006	Unreleased	May 16, 2006
X2: Wolverine's Revenge X-Men 2: Wolverine's Revenge (PAL)	GenePool Software	Activision	Apr 17, 2003	Jul 22, 2004	Apr 15, 2003
Xbox Music Mixer	WildTangent	Microsoft Game Studios	Nov 28, 2003	Jan 1, 2004	Oct 27, 2003
XGRA: Extreme-G Racing Association	Acclaim Studios Cheltenham	Acclaim Entertainment	Oct 1, 2003^{AUS} Oct 3, 2003^{EU}	Unreleased	Sep 16, 2003
Xiaolin Showdown	BottleRocket Entertainment	Konami	Jun 29, 2007	Unreleased	Nov 14, 2006
XIII	Southend Interactive	Ubisoft	Nov 28, 2003	Aug 5, 2004	Nov 18, 2003
Xyanide	Playlogic Entertainment	Evolved Games	Unreleased	Unreleased	Aug 15, 2006
Yager	Yager Development	THQ^{PAL} Kemco^{NA}	May 23, 2003	Unreleased	Sep 28, 2004
Yetisports Arctic Adventures	Pirate Games	JoWooD Productions	Jul 18, 2005	Unreleased	Unreleased
Yonenaga Kunio no Shougi Seminar	Success	Success	Unreleased	Jun 13, 2002	Unreleased
Yourself!Fitness	Respondesign	Respondesign	Unreleased	Unreleased	Oct 8, 2004
Yu-Gi-Oh! The Dawn of Destiny	Konami Computer Entertainment Japan	Konami	Nov 19, 2004^{EU} Dec 3, 2004^{AUS}	Unreleased	Mar 23, 2004
Zapper: One Wicked Cricket	Blitz Games	Infogrames	Mar 14, 2003	Unreleased	Nov 5, 2002
Zathura	High Voltage Software	2K Games	Jan 27, 2006	Unreleased	Nov 3, 2005
ZillerNet (Note: This game was only released in South Korea)	Studio9; Taijin Media	Microsoft Game Studios	Unreleased	Jul 10, 2005^{KOR}	Unreleased

== See also ==
- List of best-selling Xbox video games
- List of Xbox network games
