= Drihoo =

2002 video game

- Developer: Highwaystar
- Publisher: Highwaystar
- Platform: Xbox
- Release: JP: November 28, 2002
- Genre: Action
- Mode: Single-player

Drihoo (ドリホー) is an action adventure game developed and published by Japanese studio Highwaystar for the Xbox. The game was released exclusively in Japan on November 28, 2002. Known as Piledriver in development, it was the first Xbox game to be funded in part by a joint venture from Microsoft and Japan Digital Contents The game was priced at 6800 Yen RRP. From November 1st 2002, a ringtone medley was available via Melo DAM. A four page manga by Yuriko Yamaguchi was also published. An English release was announced under the title Piledriver but was quietly cancelled.

== Gameplay ==
The game revolves around the dwarf Dunk (36 years old), who after surviving the collapse of a cave and being cut off from the rest of his team while excavating ruins, searches for treasures and other relics. The player drills underground through a large area to find these items. Dunk can get tired and has to drink an alcohol named "beev" to recover his stamina. The player can travel to a nearby town to upgrade their drill and buy other items and sell the valuables they find.

Throughout the game, the player will encounter enemies such as goblins, mummies, and scorpions that will attack the player during exploration. Dunk can defend himself with his hammer or drill. The player can also meet various NPCs inside the tunnels that sell explosives and other useful items.

Tunnels dug by players can collapse.
