= Championship Manager: Season 02/03 =

2002 video game

- Cover art
- Developer: Sports Interactive
- Publisher: Eidos Interactive
- Platform: Xbox
- Release: EU: 29 November 2002
- Genre: Sports
- Mode: Single-player

Championship Manager: Season 02/03 is a football management video game in the Championship Manager series, developed by Sports Interactive and published by Eidos Interactive, released exclusively for Xbox on 29 November 2002 in Europe only. The game featured up-to-date team and player data for over 100,000 footballers and staff, 27 worldwide leagues, and an updated FIFA transfer system.

== Reception ==
Reception

Aggregate score
Aggregator	Score
GameRankings	87% (13 reviews)

Review scores
Publication	Score
Eurogamer	9 out of 10
Official Xbox Magazine (UK)	8.1 out of 10
Gamer.tv	8.9 out of 10
Videogameslife	4 out of 5
Mad Gamers	8 out of 10

The game received generally positive reviews upon release. The game received an aggregate score of 87% from GameRankings based on 13 reviews.

Gamer.tv stated "Championship Manager is, just like real football, endlessly frustrating... But, just like real football, can also be really, truly, utterly fantastic. Electrifying. A hoot". Eurogamer noted "it's one of the most insanely alluring gameplay experiences ever". While TotalGames.net commented "There is one enhancement - the joypad rumbles when a goal is scored. Woopee-freakin-do. And they've also included the new FIFA transfer regulations, so you now only get specific transfer windows. But it's hardly an enhancement that really improves your experience... Still a great game".
