= High Rollers Casino =

2004 video game

- North American PlayStation 2 cover art
- Developers: Cinemaware; Virtual Toys
- Publisher: Mud Duck Productions
- Director: Fabriciano García
- Designer: James Farley
- Composer: Victor Peral Urbina
- Engine: RenderWare
- Platforms: PlayStation 2, Xbox
- Release: NA: November 11, 2004
- Genre: Casino
- Mode: Single-player

High Rollers Casino is a 2004 casino video game co-developed by Cinemaware and Spanish studio Virtual Toys for the PlayStation 2 and Xbox gaming consoles. The game allows players to partake in various games typically found within a casino, ranging from card to slot machines.

== Gameplay ==
Upon beginning the game, the player is tasked with the creation of a character. After one is made, they are placed within the casino itself, a 3D room, and given full control of their avatar. To begin a game, the player must walk up to the respective machine or table. Alongside the games are various NPCs who can be interacted with. Certain ones carry specific benefits. For example, approaching the bartender will allow him to explain the rules of any game in the casino, as well as provide tutorials on how they play. If the player goes bankrupt during their gambling, they can visit the cashier, who will purchase prizes won during games from your character. As more winnings are collected, the player's status within the casino increases, ranging from silver to platinum. This unlocks bonuses within the game.

== Reception ==
High Rollers Casino was generally ignored by critics not receiving the minimum requirement of four reviews for Metacritic to assign a score. The reviews it did receive were generally mixed. Xbox Nation Magazine (XBN) awarded the game a 7/10, while Team Xbox assigned a score of 3/10.

Ivan Sulic of IGN gave the game a 1/10, criticizing every aspect of the game from the music to the graphics and gameplay. Sulic even called the camera flawed, saying "How can a gambling game have an awful camera system?" He also questioned the lack of multiplayer. It remains one of the lowest rated games in IGN history.
