= MLB Slugfest: Loaded =

2004 video game

- Developer: Point of View
- Publisher: Midway Sports
- Series: MLB Slugfest
- Engine: RenderWare
- Platforms: PlayStation 2, Xbox
- Release: NA: June 21, 2004
- Genre: Sports (baseball)
- Modes: Single-player, multiplayer

MLB SlugFest: Loaded is a baseball video game developed by Point of View and published by Midway Sports in 2004 for the PlayStation 2 and Xbox. It is the third game in the MLB Slugfest series. Sammy Sosa from the Chicago Cubs is the cover athlete.

== Reception ==
Reception

Aggregate score
Aggregator	Score	
Aggregator	PS2	Xbox
Metacritic	77/100	77/100

Review scores
Publication	Score	
Publication	PS2	Xbox
Electronic Gaming Monthly	7.67/10	7.67/10
Game Informer	6.25/10	6.25/10
GamePro	3.5/5	3.5/5
GameRevolution	C+	C+
GameSpot	7.8/10	7.8/10
GameSpy	4/5	4/5
GameZone	8.4/10	7/10
IGN	8/10	8/10
Official U.S. PlayStation Magazine	3.5/5	N/A
Official Xbox Magazine (US)	N/A	7.1/10
Maxim	4/5	4/5

The game received "generally favorable reviews" on both platforms according to the review aggregation website Metacritic.
