= Army Men: Sarge's Heroes =

1999 video game

- North American Nintendo 64 box art
- Developer: The 3DO Company (Note: Ported to Dreamcast by Saffire.)
- Publisher: The 3DO Company (Note: Dreamcast version published by Midway. PC version published in North America by GT Interactive.)
- Designer: Trip Hawkins
- Programmers: Dan Geisler; Joel Dinolt; John Renstrom
- Artists: Nina Stanley; Mike Kennedy; Don Seegmiller
- Writer: Sharon Wong
- Series: Army Men
- Platforms: Nintendo 64, PlayStation, Dreamcast, Windows
- Release: September 28, 1999: Nintendo 64; NA: September 28, 1999; EU: April 14, 2000 PlayStation; NA: February 23, 2000; EU: August 17, 2000 Dreamcast; NA: October 31, 2000; EU: November 17, 2000 Windows; NA: 2000; EU: December 15, 2000
- Genre: Third-person shooter
- Modes: Single-player, multiplayer

Army Men: Sarge's Heroes is a 1999 third-person shooter video game and the fourth entry in The 3DO Company's Army Men series, which are based on the green plastic figures of the same name. Its Nintendo 64 and PlayStation versions were developed and published by The 3DO Company. The port for the Dreamcast was developed by Saffire and published by Midway, while another for Microsoft Windows was published by GT Interactive.

The primary single-player mode depicts the Green Army, led by Colonel Grimm, fighting against General Plastro's Tan Army, which have found portals to Our World (the human world) that contain useful weapons when fighting in Their World (the world where the plastic soldiers reside). In 3D battlefields of both worlds, the player acts as plastic soldiers of the Green Army completing a variety of missions. In the game's multi-player modes, tan, gray or blue soldiers are options for playable characters. The game features variations of 13 weapons.

Part of a series that covered multiple genres, Army Men: Sarge's Heroes was set by The 3DO Company's founder Trip Hawkins and creative director Michael Mendheim to be a character-focused action-adventure game a la Super Mario (1985–present). Mendheim focused on characters and personalities so that transmedia content could be produced out of them, although none was ever made. He wanted to emphasize the "toy aspect" lacking in the series' previous entries but seen in the army men of Toy Story (1995), which he felt could be the "magic" of the franchise. The game stars Jim Cummings as all the male characters and Susan Blu as Vikki.

Reception from the specialist gaming press were ambivalent, the general notion being that Army Men: Sarge's Heroes was a fun and humorous action game marred by several graphical and technical problems, such as with the controls, camera, draw distance and overuse of fog. As of 2022, 1.3 million units of the Nintendo 64 and PlayStation games combined were sold. The characters would star in several of the later Army Men games by The 3DO Company. Army Men: Sarge's Heroes itself garnered two sequels, Army Men: Sarge's Heroes 2 (2000) and Army Men: Sarge's War (2004).

== Gameplay ==
In the third-person shooter, soldiers of the Green and Tan Army fight each other on a variety of 3D environments, including those in Our World (the human world). One such setting is a desk with the portal being the opening of a coffee cup (middle).

=== Synopsis ===
Army Men: Sarge's Heroes is a third-person shooter where players take the role of soldiers in 3D battlefields. It has the feel, pace, weapons and level design of classic arcade shooters like Ikari Warriors (1986) and Guerrilla War (1987), and also features elements of GoldenEye (1997), Command & Conquer (1995), and platform video games. In Their World (the setting for the plastic soldiers) The Green Army, led by Colonel Grimm, has members of the Bravo Company, its best troops, and Grimm's daughter Vikki, a top reporter for the official Green Army newspaper Green Star News, captured by the Tan Army, led by General Plastro. The Tan Army have discovered portals to Our World (the human world), which lie weapons such as magnifying glasses that can melt soldiers. On the Green Army's base, the game's first mission is the leader of the Bravo Company that did not get captured, Sargent Hawk, getting Grimm, his mentor, to an escape chopper. This is all the while the invading Tan Army and other Green Army soldiers attack each other, where Sarge also helps his fellow men. Army Men: Sarge's Heroes features split screen multi-player modes for two players on the PlayStation, and up to four players on the Nintendo 64 and Dreamcast, consisting of deathmatch, capture the flag, and matches where players invade each other's bases. In a Family Mode borrowed from 3DO's BattleTanx (1998), players can individually choose the difficulty level of the choice of weapons, i.e. ones that are quicker to adapt to.

=== Missions ===
The Nintendo 64 and PlayStation versions have 14 missions with up to five objectives each, the Dreamcast 16 missions with three-to-four objectives each, totaling to 40. Tasks vary from finding and rescuing the Bravo Company and Vikki, and disabling a "bug zapper" gate, to capturing blue spies, killing Tan Army soldiers and destroying the portals. The camera defaults to a steady and slightly over-the-shoulder third-person perspective of the player character. Other options are to view the character from the front or first-person, activated with the press of a button. The 3D spaces can theoretically be traversed at the player's own free will, but the missions can be completed by following a path with no requirement for backtracking.

The mission locations bounce between Their World (the plastic world) and Our World (known by Plastro as the Alternate World, the human world). (Note: 3DO's Michael Mendheim referred to the universes as Their World and Our World/Alternate World, while Nintendo 64 and PlayStation reviews from GamePro and IGN stated their names as the Plastic World and the Real World.) In Their World, the soldiers are scaled human-size in proportion to the setting, and fight on army bases, forests, towns, mountains, and snowy wastelands. In Our World, the plastic soldiers are tiny in proportion to the space and battle in areas of a typical American suburban household, such as the countertop of a kitchen, sandbox, backyard, living room, bedroom, garden, and bathroom. In Their World, foes are the Tan army's soldiers (which dies in one or two hits), tanks and helicopters, while in Our World, enemies include a big spider.

=== Characters and weapons ===
Nine characters are playable in single and multi-player modes. With control that heavily uses context-sensitive buttons like a previously released Nintendo 64 game, The Legend of Zelda: Ocarina of Time (1998), the player can jump, climb, latch onto ledges, drop and roll, crawl, crouch, strafe, and sneak up to enemies and attack them typical in stealth games. In addition to Hawk, Grimm, Vikki, and Plastro, the game stars five Bravo Company soldiers, modeled after specific poses. The Riff is a Bazooka Man with "the musical chops and coolness of a Blues musician". Hoover is a very skinny, geeky Mine Sweeper hired for his fluid movements and intense focus. Shrap, a Morter Man with a surfer dude personality; Thick, the M-60 Machine Gunner with a strong aim but low intelligence; and Scorch, a Flamethrower so mentally-unstable he loves being near fire. In single player, Sarge and whoever is rescued are the only playable characters; in a mission, a rescued soldier assists for the remainder of a mission, which ends prematurely if they die. In multiplayer modes, players can act as a tan, blue or grey fighter as well as a green one.

Army Men: Sarge's Heroes features variations on 13 weapons that equip the player, most of which require the rescue of commandos that each have a unique set of weapons: an M16 rifle, M60, sniper rifle with a scope for zooming, shotgun, grenade, grenade launcher, C-4, flamethrower, artillery launcher, bazooka, mortar, satchel charge, and mine detector. Collected extra weapons are removed from the inventory by the entrance of the next world. Via simple objectives, the Boot Camp mode, which takes place on a practice range, teaches the player how to platform, use the weapons and push down the levers.

Some tasks can be only be achieved with certain equipment; soldiers on mountaintops can only be killed with snipers, and those in bunkers with grenades. Additionally, some lands are filled with hidden mines solely detectable with the minesweeper. Other scenarios allow multiple choices of weapons to take out opponents. For example, when destroying a tank, it is longer but safer to lay mines around it and then activate them with a grenade throw, than directly destroy it with a bazooka, where missing the shooting could gain the riders of the tank attention to the player character. All weapons besides the default M16 rifle are out of the soldiers' bag if a life is lost.

== Background ==
In the late 1990s, following the failure of the 3DO Interactive Multiplayer console, The 3DO Company transitioned to developing and publishing only software. The move started with the Nintendo 64 multiplayer game Battletanx and the tactical PC game Army Men (based on the green plastic toy soldiers of the same name), both developed by separate teams, released around the same time in 1998, and landing in the top-ten of sales charts. The 3DO Company were influenced by this success to create more Army Men games, with its producers and creative staff conceiving a variety of gameplay styles, such as air combat (Army Men: Air Attack) and war strategy (Army Men: World War).

This spawned a multi-million-dollar franchise. As journalists for Game Informer analyzed, the franchise capitalized on a nostalgic revival of toys adults used to play with, like the Army men as well as Mr. Potato Head and Slinky Dog, caused by a film that featured them, Toy Story (1995). 3DO's founder Trip Hawkins, IGN's Dean Austin and PlayStation Pro's Will Johnston attributed the game series' continuing commercial success to the demographic of video game consumers, mostly consisting of men, who had fond memories of playing with the green soldiers.

Before Army Men: Sarge's Heroes, the series had covered multiple genres and platforms with two tactics games, the first game and its sequel Army Men II (1999) which were both released for PC and the Game Boy Color, and a PlayStation third-person shooter, Army Men 3D (1999). Wrote Joe Fielder of GameSpot, Army Men 3D, the series' first console entry, "lacked a great deal of spit and polish but had enough going deep down to make you hope for a sequel, albeit one that was much improved".

== Development ==
=== Conception and design ===
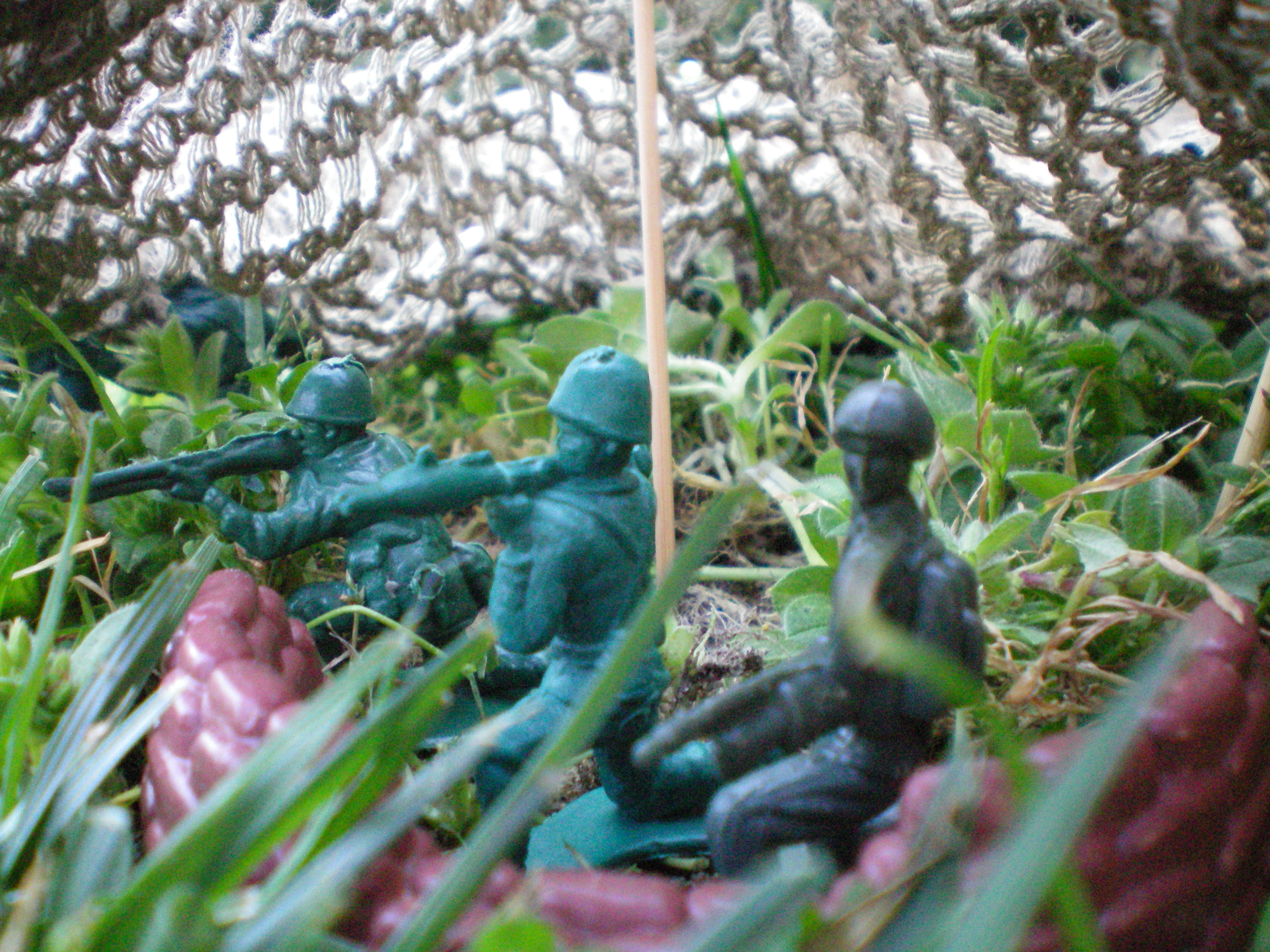
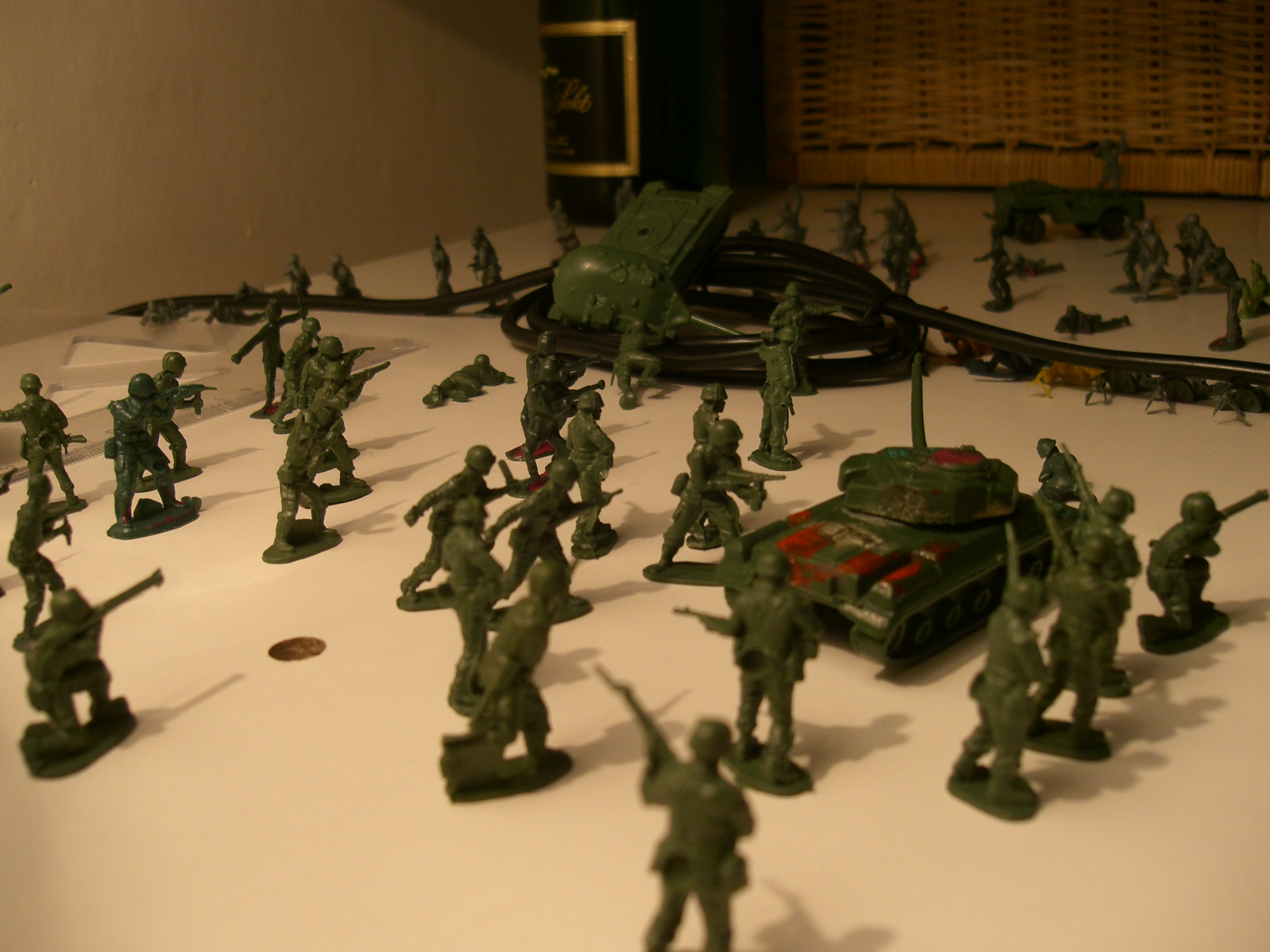
From left to right: Toy army men assembled on a lawn and a kitchen countertop. Army Men: Sarge's Heroes focused more on the "toy aspect" of the army men than previous series entries, creating scenarios like the ones portrayed here.

Army Men: Sarge's Heroes is the second creative director project for Michael Mendheim, who, like Hawkins, transitioned from Electronic Arts (EA) to The 3DO Company; he joined during the company's transition to solely a game developer and publisher, being creative director for Battletanx. Designers of Army Men: Sarge's Heroes were Hawkins, B.J. Cholewinski, James Frankle, Mike King, and Robert Zalot. Justin Bates, Ben Lopez and Jon "Pan" Oakley were only credited as designer on the Nintendo 64 and Dreamcast releases, James Farley only on the PlayStation. Although Mendheim suggested artist Michael Kennedy was "driving the story and cinematics", the game credited Sharon Wong as writing the story.

Hawkins and Mendheim established Sarge's Heroes as the franchise's inaugural character-oriented action-adventure game, taking inspiration from the style of Super Mario (1985–present) and incorporating mission design akin to GoldenEye (1997). Army Men: Sarge's Heroes was first announced by The 3DO Company on March 5, 1999, to be released for the Nintendo 64; it was revealed its genre would deviate from previous Army Men games, being a 3D action game a la the Tomb Raider series (1996–present) or Mission: Impossible (1998) with the sniper mechanics of GoldenEye and MDK (1997). A PlayStation version was announced a month later on April 6, with the clarification that it would not be a sequel to Army Men 3D but another version of the previously announced Nintendo 64 game. Mendheim's reason for the focus on a narrative starring characters with personalities and gameplay mechanics was as a blueprint for potential toys, TV series and comic books that would form a transmedia universe Mendheim desired. This direction was influenced by the Mutant League games he worked on at EA, which included Mutant League Football (1993) and Mutant League Hockey (1994) and spawned a cartoon show of the same name (1994–1996).

The only character from a predecessor was the titular protagonist, who was in Army Men 3D. In conceiving the personalities and settings, Mendheim leaned towards what he thought could be the series' "magic", the "toy aspect" seen in the army men of Toy Story. Although parts of the game would be fighting in the semi-realistic environments of Army Men and Army Men 3D, "I wanted to have these soldiers fighting on kitchen countertops, in a bathtub and under a Christmas tree" as well. In particular, "The thought of kitchen counter warfare sounded like an absolute blast and it was something that hasn't really been done before in an action shooter." Sgt. Fury and his Howling Commandos (1963–1981) and war films like The Dirty Dozen (1976) were inspirations for the characters. For example, Riff's African-American race and nationality, as well as his tough demeanor, was based on Jim Brown's Robert Jefferson character in The Dirty Dozen. Barney Fife from The Andy Griffith Show (1960–1968) inspired the inclusion of a timid character.

=== Production ===
In the late 1990s, The 3DO Company attempted to have a prolific output with far less money than EA when trying to enter the software market. This caused tight budgets and schedules for projects, requiring workers to be at the studio for long hours and on weekends. Mendheim improved himself from these experiences, learning how to make games that looked and felt high-value with limited resources. Although he has never revealed the start and end dates of development, he reported Army Men: Sarge's Heroes was done under a year, and in the last two months, members of the team were working 16–18 hours a day, not going home on some days. Mendheim, in 2022, felt the game needed three more months to fix issues of the camera and difficulty balance. At Saffire, the Dreamcast project was led by one of its artists, Brent Fox.

Versions of the game had different teams. On the Nintendo 64, the technical director was Dan Geisler, an industry veteran who created EA's Road Rash (1991). Mendheim considered the engine produced by him and other engineers ambitious, attempting to render high distances of big spaces and, in multi-player, running third-person perspective viewing spots for all four players, all the while maintaining a decent frame rate. The showing-off of the game's scale was also his explanation for a third-person perspective being the default camera setting, an additional rationale being that it was the best way to introduce the new characters. Also on the Nintendo console, Chris Bannock, Todd Stewart, Mike Tsoupko-Sitnikov and Pete "Spuddy" Wiseman were programmers, with Dino Dini, Dominick Regan, Chuck Romberger and Mark Schneckloth credited for additional programming.

On the PlayStation, Bob Smith was technical director; Mendheim called him "a Gods' God", in comparison to Geisler who was simply a "God". When it came to programmers, the PlayStation version had Isaac Bender, Ian Clarke, Burke Drane and Steve Woita on a programming team led by Joel Dinolt; Bannock was credit as an additional programmer alongside Olivier Lhermite and Paul Robinson. The Dreamcast version's programming staff was led by John Renstrom and consisted of Bryan Towler, Jun Liu and "additional programmers" Taylor Colbert and Kier Knowlton. The PC port was made solely by a team at Aqua Pacific that consisted of four programmers: Garry Hughes, Paul Riga, Craig Weeks and Don Williamson.

A pre-alpha version of the Nintendo 64 game was reviewed in a "Hands On" feature by IGN, published on March 5, 1999. It summarized that split-screen modes for up to four players were planned but not yet implemented. When it came to visuals, the frame rate was reported as smooth, the environments vastly superior to Battletanx. Next Generation's June 1999 insider coverage of the game concluded development was "pretty far along for a fall release date".

=== Presentation ===
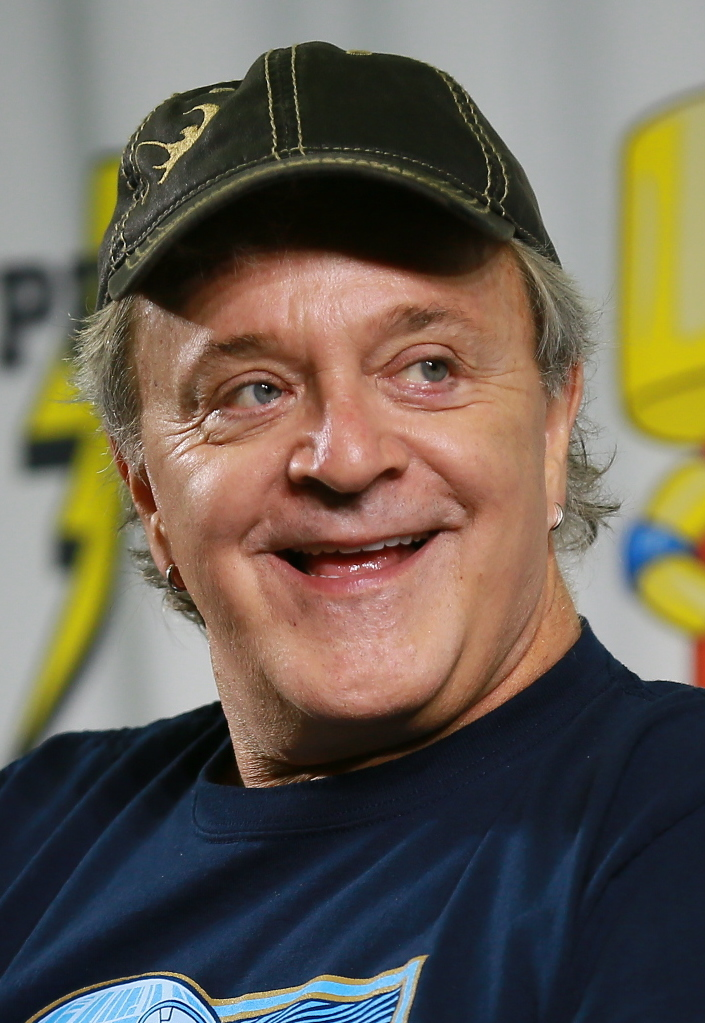
Jim Cummings in 2016. He voiced all of the male characters in Army Men: Sarge's Heroes.

Of versions developed by the 3DO Company, Nina Stanley was the art director of the project, implementing various techniques to create a signature style; one was the use of references to photos and live models to design the characters. Far more important was the character animation, which Mendheim exclaimed in an interview with Next Generation that "we're putting our chips on [it]." Done at the start of the project, it was hand-drawn for expressive and overelaborate motion not achieve-able with motion capture, which was prominently used in the industry at the time. Tests with motion capture were done, but "it just looked scary—kind of surreal" when combined with the plastic shine effects, explained Mendheim. In the end, more than 150 hand-drawn animations were completed for the project. A "Hands On" preview feature from IGN on March 5, 1999, described its animation as "disney-style", with "Realistic movements and funny death animations". Mendheim wanted a more plastic look for the soldiers in comparison to previous entries. To achieve this, Geisler created the Plastosheen engine, which used mathematical formulas that estimated the light reflections.

For both the Nintendo 64 and PlayStation releases, Mike Kennedy, Lance Charnes, Inna Cherneykina, Michael Drake, Michael Groark, Nels Potts, and Brian Steffel were artists, and Olga Chudnovsky, Nathan Walrath, and Glyphx additional artists. Kennedy was lead artist, Groark a main artist and Charnes an additional artist on the PlayStation. Charnes was a main artist and Kennedy and Groark only additional artists on the Nintendo 64. The PlayStation game also had Vadim Grigoriev, Audrey Rubetskoy, Jane Sommerhauser, and Leonid Starkov as artists. For the Nintendo 64 game, Animatek was an additional artist. On the Dreamcast, Don Seegmiller was art director. Fox, Robyn Miley, Johnny Breeze, Richard Russell, Mike May, and Todd Dewsnup were artists, Dave McClellan and Robert Rumel additional artists. In a retrospective interview, Mendheim credited Michael "Vick" Vaverka as an "art lead". However, all versions only credit him as responsible for cutscenes, alongside Isaac Bender.

Due to the disparate architecture between consoles, each version exploited different aspects, particularly with the graphics. Although Mendheim felt the Nintendo 64 could render in-game graphics better, the PlayStation had the capacity to play video files, influencing the creation of video cutscenes for the PlayStation version. Jim Cummings, a voice actor of several notable cartoon characters like Tigger throughout his career, voiced all of the game's male characters. He was given summaries and a few photos of the characters, and he improvised the voices for them on the spot, causing redesigns to suit the performances. Susan Blu was the only other voice actor, playing Vikki.

== Release and promotion ==
On the night of March 4, 1999, The 3DO Company held a hidden "pre-E3 bash" in San Francisco. It featured numerous surprise attractions, one of them a playable version of the Nintendo 64 version of Army Men: Sarge's Heroes. Army Men, in its second year of existence in 1999, saw five games: Army Men II, Army Men 3D, Army Men: Sarge's Heroes, Army Men: Air Attack and Army Men: Toys in Space, the latter three released at the end of the year. Army Men: Sarge's Heroes was the first Nintendo 64 Army Men game, released in 1999 in North America on September 28 and Australia in November. On the PlayStation, Army Men: Sarge's Heroes was released in 2000, on February 23 in North America and August 17 in Europe. It is the third PlayStation Army Men game after Army Men 3D and Army Men: Air Attack (1999), and was part of a wave of sequels released between 2000 and 2001 that also include entries for series like Crash Bandicoot (1996–present), Tomb Raider (1996–present) and Twisted Metal (1995–2012).

== Reception ==
=== Critical response ===
Critical reception (all consoles)

Aggregate scores
Aggregator	Score		
Aggregator	Dreamcast	N64	PS
GameRankings	56%	62%	49%
Metacritic	60/100	N/A	N/A

Review scores
Publication	Score		
Publication	Dreamcast	N64	PS
AllGame	2.5/5	2.5/5	N/A
CNET Gamecenter	N/A	7/10	5/10
Electronic Gaming Monthly	4/10	15.5/40 (Note: Four critics of Electronic Gaming Monthly gave the Nintendo 64 version each a score of 5/10, 6/10, 4.5/10, and 3/10.)	N/A
EP Daily	6/10	4/10	N/A
Eurogamer	N/A	N/A	5/10
Game Informer	N/A	7/10	5.5/10
GameFan	N/A	233/300	N/A
GamePro	N/A	15/20 (Note: GamePro gave the Nintendo 64 version three 4/5 scores for graphics, sound, and fun factor, and 3/5 for control.)	14/20 (Note: GamePro gave the PlayStation version four 3.5/5 scores for graphics, sound, control, and fun factor.)
GameRevolution	N/A	D	N/A
GameSpot	6.5/10	4.2/10	3.9/10
IGN	5.3/10	6/10	3.5/10
Jeuxvideo.com	N/A	N/A	9/20
M! Games	67/100	N/A	N/A
Mega Fun	N/A	N/A	47/100
N64 Magazine	N/A	67%	N/A
Next Generation	2/5	3/5	N/A
Nintendo Power	N/A	7.4/10	N/A
Official Nintendo Magazine	N/A	79%	N/A
Official U.S. PlayStation Magazine	N/A	N/A	2/5
Superjuegos	N/A	90/100	N/A
Video Games (DE)	N/A	NTSC: 80% PAL: 70%	44%
N64 Gamer	N/A	84%	N/A
Official Dreamcast Magazine (UK)	3/10	N/A	N/A
Official Dreamcast Magazine (US)	7/10	N/A	N/A
PlayStation Pro	N/A	N/A	65%

Although Mendheim, two decades later, remembered the contemporaneous reviews of Army Men: Sarge's Heroes as "decent", aggregates of professional review scores paint a more middling picture. On GameRankings, average ratings of versions of the game range from 49% to 62%. The consensus was it was far better in concept than execution, a fun, humorous and promising action game at its core marred by issues related to the visuals and technical aspects. The general recommendation was a rental.

Parts of the concept that charmed critics were its story, characters, humor, offbeat nature, and small toys fighting each other in gigantic real-life spaces. The toys alternating between both universes was a particular source of intrigue. When it came to gameplay, some criticized it as monotonous, constantly shooting and blowing up enemies and tanks with the same set of weapons and no deviation from the formula. However, praise was given to the missions for being fun, long and diverse, with "entertaining and inventive plot twists" as one critic rejoiced. The weapons were also praised for their high quantity and variety.

The controls were widely labeled extremely slow, unresponsive, imprecise, cumbersome, and loose. The most condemned specific was turning. Critics argued that it took too long to turn around for the player character to be positioned against the attacking enemies. The camera was also panned as well. It was commonly derided for its floaty movement and failure to keep up with sudden turnarounds and increases in movements in a short-enough amount of time, causing an inability to position the character to see attacking out-of-sight enemies and, thus, injuries by them. As a consequence, to avoid the shots of a bombardment of enemies, the easy-to-use auto-aim of the default weapon was not only useful but also necessary. A few critics explained the biggest cause of frustration was the combination of controls and camera problems.

Comments on the collision detection were negative, with some critics reporting falling to the ground several times. The artificial intelligence (AI) was criticized as nonsensical, with enemies that would not attack when threatened and Sarge's colleagues wondering at random. The N64 and PS1 versions were reported to have an abundance of fog and pop-ups caused by a low draw distance, hindering navigation and detracting from the experience. A small minority of reviews commented on the framerate, choppy on the Nintendo 64 and PlayStation versions, and consistent for the Dreamcast.

Several opinions on the graphics ranged from decent to overwhelmingly favorable, while other critics called them on-par or weaker than 3D games released in the previous few years. Critics generally considered the graphics a step up from Army Men 3D, citing a more vibrant color palette and more plastic-looking textures. The look of the characters and their plastic texturing was favorably received. Reviewers of the Nintendo 64 version were amazed by the use of lighting and shining effects on the soldiers' surface material, truly realized with the Game Pak activated. The animations were also acclaimed. Some reviewers were disappointed with the scarcity of props in the 3D spaces, although it was clarified it was much less of a problem in the human world. The Dreamcast port was considered an improvement over other versions, such as the PlayStation release, in terms of its graphics.

=== Commercial performance ===
When announcing the release of a PlayStation port, Hawkins announced Army Men: Sarge's Heroes as the best-selling game in the series so far, and doing better than most other 3DO games, such as Battletanx and games in the company's Might and Magic (1996–2003) and High Heat (1998–2003) properties. Upon its October 1999 release, the Nintendo 64 version debuted at number four on Video Software Dealers Association's console game rental chart, above Star Wars: Episode I – The Phantom Menace (1999) but below the chart-topping Pokémon Snap (1999) and two PlayStation games, Driver (1999) and WCW Mayhem (1999). In Patrick Hickey Jr.'s feature on the development of the game in the 2022 book The Mind Behind Playstation Games, it was reported that its Nintendo 64 and PlayStation versions combined sold 1.3 million units. In an interview conducted for the book, Mendheim stated it was a number-one hit on the Nintendo 64 chart and a top-ten hit for that of the PlayStation.

== Legacy ==
Many later Army Men games, including 3DO's final game for the franchise Army Men: RTS (2002), would star all of the characters introduced in Army Men: Sarge's Heroes. A spin-off game starring Vikki, Portal Runner (2001), was released on the PlayStation 2. Army Men: Sarge's Heroes spawned two sequels of its own: Army Men: Sarge's Heroes 2 (2000) and Army Men: Sarge's War (2004), the latter of which was developed and released after The 3DO Company's selling of the franchise to Global Star Software.

Explained Mendheim, the hit status of the early Army Men games, like Army Men: Sarge's Heroes, gave The 3DO Company the notion that they could keep pumping out more of them every quarter; this caused the series' decline of innovation, quality and popularity with the press and players to bargain bin status. Zoey Hendley, in 2021, noted its prolific output as more than that of franchises like Guitar Hero (2005–2015). Hickey Jr. explained retrospective players and writers debate which Army Men had the longest staying power, but he felt the arcade-style gameplay and child-friendly plot of Army Men: Sarge's Heroes made it the most accessible.

Digital Cybercherries' shooter game Hypercharge: Unboxed (2020), conceived out of the development team's session of watching Small Soldiers (1998) on television, was partially influenced by Army Men: Sarge's Heroes.
