= Susan Blu =

Voice actress and director

- Other name: Sue Blu
- Occupations: Voice actress; voice director; casting-director
- Years active: 1968–present
- Spouse: Tania Themmen (m. 2013)
- Partner: Cynthia Songé (1982–2010; her death)
- Relatives: Paris Themmen (brother-in-law)

Susan Blu, better known as Sue Blu, is an American voice-actress, voice-director, and casting-director in American and Canadian cinema and television. She most notably voiced Arcee in The Transformers: The Movie and Seasons 3 and 4 of The Transformers (she later reprised the role in Transformers: Animated). She is also known for playing the roles of Stormer/Mary Phillips and Lindsey Pierce in the 1980s animated series Jem. She also served as a casting and voice director for Handy Manny, for which she also guest-starred as Marion.

== Life and career ==
Blu graduated from Stephens College in Columbia, Missouri. Her voice roles include Nanny Smurf on The Smurfs, Judge J.B. McBride on BraveStarr, Jessica Wray, Futura and Belfry on Ghostbusters, Aimee Brightower on Galaxy High, Kim on Fangface, Hiccup on Little Clowns of Happytown, Lofty, Paradise, Buttons and other minor characters on My Little Pony, the character Transmutate in the episode of the same name of the series Beast Wars, and one of Petrie (Jeff Bennett)'s siblings in The Land Before Time XII: The Great Day of the Flyers (2006). She also played Princess PawPaw on Hanna-Barbera's Paw Paws, the Sphinx on Tiny Toon Adventures, and provided the voice of Sibella from the television movie Scooby Doo and the Ghoul School (1988).

Blu has worked as a voice-director for the Ocean Group, a Canadian-based company most notable for providing the voice-actors for Viz Communications and Beast Wars series. She was the voice director for Beast Wars, a prequel (and sequel) of The Transformers, and the sequel, Beast Machines. She was the dialogue director on the Teenage Mutant Ninja Turtles 1987 TV series and was also the voice director on the Teenage Mutant Ninja Turtles 2003 TV series. She was the voice-director for Transformers: Animated and reprised her role of Arcee from The Transformers: The Movie and the original Transformers animated series. She also played the role of Vikki Grimm from the Army Men series. She is also the voice director and voice actor for The Magic School Bus. She worked as voice director for Transformers: Prime until Season 1, Episode 11, when the death of her partner Cynthia Songé forced her to turn the position over to Jamie Simone.

Blu's on-screen appearances include an appearance on the 1977 television series Three's Company, an appearance on the television series Knight Rider, and the role of Amanda Shepard in Friday the 13th Part VII: The New Blood (1988).

== Personal life ==
Blu is openly lesbian. Blu's domestic partner, actress Cynthia Songé, died after a brief illness in Arroyo Grande, California, on May 19, 2010. In 2013, Blu married Tania Themmen, sister of Paris Themmen.

== Filmography ==
=== Live-action television ===
- ABC Saturday Comedy Special (1976) – Archie (unsold pilot) – Midge
- The Archie Situation Comedy Musical Variety Show (TV special) (1978) – Midge
- The Wild Wild West Revisited (TV Movie) (1979) – Gabrielle

Single-episode roles in the following series

- Kojak
- The Brian Keith Show
- The Waltons
- Three's Company
- Whiz Kids
- St. Elsewhere
- Newhart
- Knight Rider (1982 series)
- Simon & Simon

=== Television animation ===
- The 13 Ghosts of Scooby-Doo – Flim Flam
- Aaahh!!! Real Monsters – Additional Voices
- American Dragon Jake Long – Jasmine as a Nix, Additional Voices
- Animal Crack-Ups – Reggie the Heggie
- Beast Wars - Transmutate
- Bigfoot and the Muscle Machines – Jennifer, Red, Redder
- Bionic Six – Ronnie Gordon
- BraveStarr – Judge J.B. McBride, Molly, Vipra, Commander Karen Kane, Additional Voices
- Captain Planet and the Planeteers – Additional Voices
- Chip 'n Dale: Rescue Rangers – Additional Voices
- Clifford's Puppy Days – Lewis Sidarsky, Mrs. Solomon
- Clifford the Big Red Dog – Dan, Billy, Aunty Sandy
- Droopy, Master Detective – Additional Voices
- DuckTales (1987 series) – Additional Voices
- The Dukes – Additional Voices (Season 2)
- The Completely Mental Misadventures of Ed Grimley – Additional Voices
- Extreme Ghostbusters – Additional Voices
- Fangface – Kim
- Fantastic Max – Additional Voices
- The Flintstone Kids – Dreamchip Gemstone, Granite Janet
- Foofur – Dolly
- G.I. Joe: A Real American Hero – Additional Voices
- Galaxy High – Aimee Brightower
- Filmation's Ghostbusters – Jessica Wray, Futura, Belfry, Additional Voices
- Godzilla: The Series – Doctor #2
- Gravedale High – Additional Voices
- Handy Manny – Marion the Librarian
- The Incredible Hulk (1982 animated series) – Rita, Additional Voices
- Invasion America – Additional Voices
- Jackie Chan Adventures – Additional Voices
- James Bond Jr. – Additional Voices
- Jem – Lin-Z/Lindsay Pierce, Stormer/Mary Phillips
- The Jetsons – Additional Voices (1985)
- Jin Jin and the Panda Patrol – Additional Voices
- The Land Before Time – Dara
- Lazer Tag Academy – Additional Voices
- Little Clowns of Happytown – Hiccup
- The Little Rascals – Additional Voices
- Madeline – Additional Voices
- The Magic School Bus – Additional Voices (including female producer)
- Monchichis – Additional Voices
- My Little Pony – Buttons, Paradise, Pluma
- The New Adventures of Zorro – Additional Voices
- New Kids on the Block – Additional Voices
- The New Yogi Bear Show – Additional Voices
- OK K.O.! Let's Be Heroes – Sibella Dracula the Vampire
- Paw Paws – Princess Paw Paw
- Popeye and Son – Shelley
- Richie Rich – Additional Voices
- Rise of the Teenage Mutant Ninja Turtles – Yokai Council Member
- The Scooby & Scrappy-Doo/Puppy Hour – Additional Voices
- The Simpsons – White Weasel, Howard
- The Smurfs – Nanny Smurf, Pansy
- Spider-Man and His Amazing Friends – Additional Voices
- Stanley, the Ugly Duckling – Stanley
- Star Fairies – Jazz
- The Tick (1994 animated series) – Suffra-Jet
- Tiny Toon Adventures – Sphinx
- Tom & Jerry Kids – Voices
- Toxic Crusaders – Additional Voices
- The Transformers – Arcee, Marissa Faireborn, Beta
- Transformers: Animated – Arcee, Flareup
- Visionaries: Knights of the Magical Light – Galadria, Heskedor
- Where's Waldo? – Additional Voices
- Where on Earth Is Carmen Sandiego? – Additional Voices
- Wildfire – Brutus
- Yogi's Treasure Hunt – Additional Voices

=== Film ===
- Rose Petal Place (1984) – Sunny Sunflower, Daffodil (voice)
- Rose Petal Place: Real Friends (1985) – Sunny Sunflower, Fuchsia, Canterbury Belle (voice)
- My Little Pony: The Movie (1986) – Lofty / Grundle / Bushwoolie #5 (voice)
- The Transformers: The Movie (1986) – Arcee (voice)
- Yogi's Great Escape (1987) – Buzzy, Little Cowgirl, Swamp Fox Girl, Swamp Fox Kids (voice)
- BraveStarr: The Movie (1988) – Judge J.B. McBride (voice)
- Scooby-Doo and the Ghoul School (1988) – Sibella the Vampire (voice)
- Yogi and the Invasion of the Space Bears (1988) – Snulu (voice)
- Friday the 13th Part VII: The New Blood (1988) – Amanda Shepard
- The Canterville Ghost (1988) – Virginia Otis (voice)
- Deadly Weapon (1989) – Shirley
- The Adventures of Ronald McDonald: McTreasure Island (1990) – Jimmy Hawkins (voice)
- The Hunchback of Notre Dame (1996) – additional voices
- Grandma Got Run Over by a Reindeer (2000) – Grandma Spankenheimer (voice)
- Cinderella II: Dreams Come True (2002) – additional voices
- Finding Nemo (2003) – additional voices
- Clifford's Really Big Movie (2004) – (voice)
- Cars (2006) – (voice)
- The Land Before Time XII: The Great Day of the Flyers (2006) – Petrie's Siblings (voice)
- Crystal Lake Memories: The Complete History of Friday the 13th (Documentary film, 2013) - Herself

=== Video games ===
- Army Men: Air Attack 2 – Vikki Grimm
- Army Men: Air Combat – The Elite Missions – Vikki Grimm, Lt. Felicity "Bombshell" Wannamaker
- Army Men: Sarge's Heroes – Vikki Grimm
- Army Men: Sarge's Heroes 2 – Vikki Grimm, Brigitte Bleu
- Portal Runner – Vikki Grimm

== Crew work ==
- A.T.O.M. – Voice Casting and Dialogue Director
- All-New Dennis the Menace – Voice Director
- An American Tail: The Mystery of the Night Monster – Casting & Voice Director
- An American Tail: The Treasure of Manhattan Island – Casting & Voice Director
- Astroblast! – Voice Director
- Balto II: Wolf Quest – Casting & Voice Director
- Balto III: Wings of Change – Casting & Voice Director
- Barnyard Commandos – Dialogue Director
- Beast Machines – Voice Director
- Beast Wars – Voice Director
- Ben 10: Omniverse – Casting & Voice Director (78 episodes)
- Big Guy and Rusty the Boy Robot – Dialogue Director
- Buster & Chauncey's Silent Night – Voice Director
- Butt-Ugly Martians – Voice Director
- Capertown Cops – Voice Director
- Choose Your Own Adventure: The Abominable Snowman – Voice Director
- Clifford the Big Red Dog – Voice Director
- Clifford's Puppy Days – Voice Director
- Clifford's Really Big Movie – Voice Director
- Chucklewood Critters – Voice Director
- Cyberchase – Voice Director (Seasons 1-4 and 6-8)
- Curious George – Casting & Voice Director (Seasons 1-9) (102 episodes)
- Curious George Swings Into Spring – Casting & Voice Director
- Curious George: A Halloween Boo Fest – Casting & Voice Director
- Curious George: A Very Monkey Christmas – Casting & Voice Director
- Curious George 2: Follow That Monkey! – Casting & Voice Director
- Curious George 3: Back to the Jungle – Casting & Voice Director
- Darkstalkers – Voice Director
- Dino Babies – Dialogue Director
- Dragon and Slippers – Voice Director
- Dragon Booster – Voice Director
- Dragons: Riders of Berk – Voice Director (ep. 6-40)
- Extreme Ghostbusters – Dialogue Director
- Godzilla: The Series – Dialogue Director
- Grandma Got Run Over by a Reindeer – Voice Director
- Handy Manny – Casting & Voice Director (78 episodes)
- Heavy Gear: The Animated Series – Dialogue Director
- Invasion America – Casting & Voice Director
- Jackie Chan Adventures – Dialogue Director
- Jackie Chan Adventures – Dialogue Director
- James Bond Jr. – Dialogue Director
- Jumanji – Dialogue Director
- Kong: The Animated Series – Voice Director
- Legion of Super Heroes – Casting & Voice Director (Season 2)
- Little Orphan Annie's A Very Animated Christmas – Voice Director
- Lost in Oz – Casting & Voice Director
- Mama Mirabelle's Home Movies – Voice Director
- Max Steel – Dialogue Director
- Maya & Miguel – Voice Director
- Men in Black: The Series – Dialogue Director
- My Life – Voice Director (Seasons 3-5)
- New Kids on the Block – Casting & Voice Director
- Open Season – Voice Director
- Richie Rich – Voice Director
- Robotech: The Shadow Chronicles – Casting & Voice Director
- Roswell Conspiracies: Aliens, Myths and Legends – Voice Director
- Roughnecks: Starship Troopers Chronicles – Dialogue Director
- Skeleton Warriors – Voice Director
- Snow White and the Magic Mirror – Dialogue Director
- Space Cats – Dialogue Director
- Special Agent Oso – Dialogue Director (43 episodes)
- Spider-Man: The New Animated Series – Dialogue Director
- Superman: Brainiac Attacks – Casting & Voice Director
- Star Wars: The Clone Wars – Casting Services
- Stone Protectors – Voice Director
- Street Fighter – Voice Director
- Stuart Little: The Animated Series – Dialogue Director
- Stuart Little 3: Call of the Wild – Casting & Voice Director
- Surf's Up – Voice Director
- Teenage Mutant Ninja Turtles – Dialogue Director
- Teenage Mutant Ninja Turtles – Voice Director (seasons 1-5)
- The Adventures of Brer Rabbit – Casting & Voice Director
- The Adventures of Corduroy – Voice Director
- The Adventures of Hyperman – Voice Director
- The Adventures of Ronald McDonald: McTreasure Island – Casting & Voice Director
- The California Raisin Show – Dialogue Director
- The Fantastic Voyages of Sinbad the Sailor – Dialogue Director
- The Land Before Time – Casting & Voice Director
- The Land Before Time VI: The Secret of Saurus Rock – Casting & Voice Director
- The Land Before Time VII: The Stone of Cold Fire – Casting & Voice Director
- The Land Before Time VIII: The Big Freeze – Casting & Voice Director
- The Land Before Time IX: Journey to Big Water – Casting & Voice Director
- The Land Before Time X: The Great Longneck Migration – Casting & Voice Director
- The Land Before Time XI: Invasion of the Tinysauruses – Casting & Voice Director
- The Land Before Time XII: The Great Day of the Flyers – Casting & Voice Director
- The Land Before Time XIII: The Wisdom of Friends – Casting & Voice Director
- The Land Before Time XIV: Journey of the Brave – Casting & Voice Director
- The Life & Adventures of Santa Claus – Casting & Voice Director
- The Life and Times of Juniper Lee – Casting & Voice Director
- The Magic School Bus – Voice Director
- The Mummy: The Animated Series – Voice Director
- The New Adventures of He-Man – Voice Director
- The New Adventures of Zorro – Dialogue Director
- The Night of the Headless Horseman – Casting & Voice Director
- The Pirates Who Don't Do Anything: A VeggieTales Movie – Casting Director
- The Tick – Voice Director (ep. 1-6) and seasons 2-3
- The Twisted Tales of Felix the Cat – Voice Director Season 1 and (ep. 18-20)
- The Wish That Changed Christmas – Voice Director
- The Wizard of Oz – Voice Director
- Toxic Crusaders – Dialogue Director
- Transformers Animated – Casting & Recording Director
- Transformers: Prime – Voice Director (ep. 1-11)
- T'was the Day Before Christmas – Voice Director
- Ultimate Book of Spells – Voice Director
- Vor-Tech: Undercover Conversion Squad – Voice Director
- Where's Waldo? – Casting & Voice Director
- Wing Commander Academy – Casting & Voice Director
- Zorro: Generation Z – Voice Director
