= Sarge =

Sarge is a shortened, informal form of the rank of Sergeant.

Other meanings include:

== Entertainment ==
- Sarge (video game), a 1985 arcade game
- Sarge (band), an indie rock band from Champaign, Illinois (USA)
- Sarge (album), a 1976 album by Delroy Wilson
- Sarge (TV series), starring George Kennedy as a cop-turned-priest

== People ==
- Sarge (nickname)
- DeWayne Bruce (born 1960), professional wrestler who used the ringname/nickname Sarge

== Fictional characters ==
- Sergeant Snorkel, in the long running Beetle Bailey comic strip
- Sarge (Toy Story), in the Toy Story franchise
- Sarge (Cars), in the Cars franchise
- Sarge (Red vs. Blue), a machinima character
- Sarge, in the webtoon series Live with Yourself!
- Sarge, in the video game Quake III Arena
- Sarge, a name shared by two different characters in the Army Men series
  - Sergeant "Sarge" John Green, a character from the original series
  - Sergeant "Sarge" Hawk, a character from the Heroes series
- Sarge Fisher, name of a new main character of Siren, a protective merman who forms a connection with human/mermaid hybrid Helen Hawkins
- Sarge (Marvel Cinematic Universe), a character in Agents of S.H.I.E.L.D.

== Other uses ==
- Sarge, the codename of version 3.1 of the Debian Linux operating system
- Suborbital Active Rocket with Guidance (SARGE), a rocket being developed by Exos Aerospace
