= Army Men: Air Tactics =

2000 video game

- Developer: The 3DO Company
- Publisher: The 3DO Company
- Series: Army Men
- Engine: Army Men II engine
- Platform: Windows
- Release: NA: March 8, 2000
- Genre: Real-time tactics
- Mode: Single-player

Army Men: Air Tactics is a 2000 real-time tactics video game developed and published by The 3DO Company for Microsoft Windows. Air Tactics is a helicopter game using the Army Men II engine.

== Overview ==
The player character is Captain William Blade of the Green Airborne Cavalry. The game is a top-down flight sim that places the player in a number of different helicopters. Captain Blade's main responsibility is to act as aerial support for Sarge Hawk and his men. The game introduces abilities such as lifting heavy objects and transporting them to other locations, landing on the ground to load/unload soldiers and unique airborne combat not seen in other games. In addition, the game contains a number of mini games such as playing air-hockey versus a Tan helicopter, as well as a number of static games.

== Reception ==
Reception

Aggregate score
| Aggregator | Score |
|---|---|
| GameRankings | 57% |

Review scores
| Publication | Score |
|---|---|
| Computer Gaming World | 2.5/5 |
| GameSpy | 57% |
| IGN | 4.5/10 |
| PC Accelerator | 5/10 |

The game received mixed reviews according to the review aggregation website GameRankings.
