= Army Men: Operation Green =

2001 video game

- North American box art
- Developer: Pocket Studios
- Publisher: The 3DO Company
- Series: Army Men
- Platform: Game Boy Advance
- Release: NA: December 3, 2001; EU: March 15, 2002
- Genre: Top-down shooter
- Mode: Single-player

Army Men: Operation Green is a 2001 top-down shooter video game developed by Pocket Studios and published by The 3DO Company for the Game Boy Advance. It is part of the Army Men series of games by The 3DO Company, which is based on army men toys. It is the second game in the series for the Game Boy Advance, after 2001's Army Men Advance.

The player controls a lone green army men soldier in tan army men soldier territory. The green soldier must complete objectives across 15 levels in order for the player to complete the game. Reception was mixed, noting that the game was an improvement over others in the Army Men video game series, but still finding fault with the game's level design and missions.

== Gameplay ==
The player fights the tan army men soldiers in the game.

The player controls a green army men soldier fighting by themselves against the tan army men in their territory. The game tasks the player with completing objectives. There are four different tasks the game assigns the player: search and rescue, search and destroy, delivery, and escort missions. The search and rescue missions task players with finding an item or person on the map and then bringing them back to the player's base. Search and destroy involves destroying a specified target to end the level. Both delivery and escort require the player to protect an object, vehicle, or person and bring them safely to a specific area on the map.

Army Men: Operation Green contains 15 levels that are set in 5 different climate environments. Although the game has a top-down perspective, the player controls their green army men character like they would in a first-person shooter. The player must fight through a mass of enemies using a variety of weapons to complete their objectives, and then move onto the next level. The weapons include a standard handgun, bazooka, grenade, flamethrower, knife, and a minesweeper; the game allows players to cycle through weapons they have picked up with the "Select" button. IGN's Craig Harris noted the gameplay's similarity to the Army Men's Game Boy Color games. In order to save progress through the game's 15 levels, the game uses a password system instead of a normal save game system.

== Development ==
3DO began development on Operation Green in April 2001. Eurogamer's Tom Bramwell wrote that early previews of Operation Green had more in common with Commandos 2 than other titles in the Army Men series. 3DO showed the first screenshots of Army Men: Operation Green and originally planned to release the title on October 10, 2001. The game was slated to release "just before Christmas" in the United States according to IGN's Craig Harris. Pocket Studios CEO Steve Illes predicted that the game would be a success. The game was released in North America on December 3, 2001.

== Reception ==
Reception

Aggregate score
Aggregator	Score
Metacritic	59/100

Review scores
Publication	Score
Computer and Video Games	6/10
GameZone	7/10
IGN	6.2/10
Nintendo Power	2.2/5

Army Men: Operation Green received "mixed or average" reviews, according to video game review aggregator Metacritic. Although most critics felt that the game was an improvement over others in the Army Men series, criticism focused on its lackluster mission design, sluggish controls, and password save system. IGN's Craig Harris called the game "relatively fun" despite the series's overall mediocre reputation, a sentiment shared by other reviewers. CVG, however, felt that the game was let down by its sluggish controls and slow-moving pace.

Reviewers were divided over the game's difficulty. GameZone's Patricia Wiley was unable to get past the second level of the game, feeling that Army Men: Operation Green was "too challenging", while IGN's Craig Harris called the game a "few hour romp" that could be completed too quickly and felt that the second half was too easy. Harris noted that the levels needed "better designs" and that they were uneven in pacing.

The password save system was dismissed and criticized by reviewers. GameZone's Patricia Wiley called the password save system "an unfortunate feature". IGN's Craig Harris felt that the password system exacerbated some of the larger levels' issues; the system does not work in the middle of levels.
