= 6th Blockbuster Entertainment Awards =

2000 entertainment awards ceremony

- Sponsored by: Blockbuster LLC
- Date: May 2000
- Location: Shrine Auditorium
- Country: USA
- Presented by: Blockbuster Awards

Television/radio coverage
- Network: Fox; Fox Radio
- Viewership: 4.5 million
- Produced by: Angela Fairhurst; Michael Levitt
- Directed by: Bruce Gowers

The 6th Blockbuster Entertainment Awards were held on May 9, 2000 at the Shrine Auditorium in Los Angeles. They were the first Blockbuster Entertainment Awards to present awards for video games in addition to music and film.

Below is a complete list of nominees and winners. Winners are highlighted in bold.

== Film ==
=== Favorite Actress - Drama ===
- **Cameron Diaz in Any Given Sunday**
- Annette Bening in American Beauty
- Winona Ryder in Girl, Interrupted

=== Favorite Actor - Drama ===
- **Tom Hanks in The Green Mile**
- Al Pacino in Any Given Sunday
- Kevin Spacey in American Beauty
- Denzel Washington in The Hurricane

=== Favorite Actress - Drama/Romance ===
- **Nicole Kidman in Eyes Wide Shut**
- Robin Wright Penn in Message in a Bottle
- Rene Russo in The Thomas Crown Affair

=== Favorite Actor - Drama/Romance ===
- **Pierce Brosnan in The Thomas Crown Affair**
- Kevin Costner in Message in a Bottle
- Tom Cruise in Eyes Wide Shut

=== Favorite Actress - Comedy/Romance ===
- **Drew Barrymore in Never Been Kissed**
- Sandra Bullock in Forces of Nature
- Julia Roberts in Runaway Bride and Notting Hill

=== Favorite Actor - Comedy/Romance ===
- **Ben Affleck in Forces of Nature**
- Richard Gere in Runaway Bride
- Hugh Grant in Notting Hill
- Freddie Prinze, Jr. in She's All That

=== Favorite Actress - Comedy ===
- **Heather Graham in Austin Powers: The Spy Who Shagged Me and Bowfinger**
- Embeth Davidtz in Bicentennial Man
- Molly Shannon in Superstar
- Sigourney Weaver in Galaxy Quest

=== Favorite Actor - Comedy ===
- **Adam Sandler in Big Daddy**
- Tim Allen in Galaxy Quest
- Mike Myers in Austin Powers: The Spy Who Shagged Me
- Rob Schneider in Deuce Bigalow: Male Gigolo
- Robin Williams in Bicentennial Man

=== Favorite Comedy Team ===
- **Robert De Niro and Billy Crystal in Analyze This**
- Steve Martin and Eddie Murphy in Bowfinger
- Eddie Murphy and Martin Lawrence in Life

=== Favorite Actress - Action ===
- **Catherine Zeta-Jones in Entrapment**
- Natalie Portman in Star Wars: Episode I – The Phantom Menace
- Denise Richards in The World Is Not Enough
- Rachel Weisz in The Mummy

=== Favorite Actor - Action ===
- **Pierce Brosnan in The World Is Not Enough**
- Sean Connery in Entrapment
- Brendan Fraser in The Mummy
- Mel Gibson in Payback

=== Favorite Action Team ===
- **Mark Wahlberg, George Clooney and Ice Cube in Three Kings**
- Brad Pitt and Edward Norton in Fight Club
- Will Smith and Kevin Kline in Wild Wild West

=== Favorite Actor - Action/Science Fiction ===
- **Keanu Reeves in The Matrix**
- Ewan McGregor in Star Wars: Episode I – The Phantom Menace
- Liam Neeson in Star Wars: Episode I – The Phantom Menace
- Arnold Schwarzenegger in End of Days

=== Favorite Actress - Suspense ===
- **Ashley Judd in Double Jeopardy**
- Angelina Jolie in The Bone Collector
- Gwyneth Paltrow in The Talented Mr. Ripley

=== Favorite Actor - Suspense ===
- **Bruce Willis in The Sixth Sense**
- Matt Damon in The Talented Mr. Ripley
- Tommy Lee Jones in Double Jeopardy
- John Travolta in The General's Daughter

=== Favorite Actress - Horror ===
- **Christina Ricci in Sleepy Hollow**
- Patricia Arquette in Stigmata
- Catherine Zeta-Jones in The Haunting

=== Favorite Actor - Horror ===
- **Johnny Depp in Sleepy Hollow**
- Gabriel Byrne in Stigmata
- Liam Neeson in The Haunting

=== Favorite Supporting Actress - Action ===
- **Salma Hayek in Wild Wild West**
- Pernilla August in Star Wars: Episode I – The Phantom Menace
- Sophie Marceau in The World Is Not Enough

=== Favorite Supporting Actor - Action ===
- **LL Cool J in Deep Blue Sea**
- John Hannah in The Mummy
- Ving Rhames in Entrapment

=== Favorite Villain ===
- **Mike Myers as "Dr. Evil" in Austin Powers: The Spy Who Shagged Me**
- Kenneth Branagh as "Dr. Loveless" in Wild Wild West
- Ray Park as "Darth Maul" in Star Wars: Episode I – The Phantom Menace
- Arnold Vosloo as "The Mummy" in The Mummy
- Hugo Weaving as "Agent Smith" in The Matrix

=== Favorite Supporting Actress - Horror ===
- **Miranda Richardson in Sleepy Hollow**
- Famke Janssen in House on Haunted Hill
- Lili Taylor in The Haunting

=== Favorite Supporting Actor - Horror ===
- **Taye Diggs in House on Haunted Hill**
- Marc Pickering in Sleepy Hollow
- Jonathan Pryce in Stigmata
- Owen Wilson in The Haunting

=== Favorite Supporting Actor - Action/Science-Fiction ===
- **Laurence Fishburne in The Matrix**
- Jake Lloyd in Star Wars: Episode I – The Phantom Menace
- Kevin Pollak in End of Days

=== Favorite Supporting Actress - Comedy ===
- **Lisa Kudrow in Analyze This**
- Joey Lauren Adams in Big Daddy
- Mindy Sterling in Austin Powers: The Spy Who Shagged Me

=== Favorite Supporting Actor - Comedy ===
- **Eugene Levy in American Pie**
- Dylan and Cole Sprouse in Big Daddy
- Verne Troyer in Austin Powers: The Spy Who Shagged Me

=== Favorite Supporting Actress - Comedy/Romance ===
- **Joan Cusack in Runaway Bride**
- Emma Chambers in Notting Hill
- Maura Tierney in Forces of Nature

=== Favorite Supporting Actor - Comedy/Romance ===
- **David Arquette in Never Been Kissed**
- Rhys Ifans in Notting Hill
- Steve Zahn in Forces of Nature

=== Favorite Supporting Actress - Drama ===
- **Angelina Jolie in Girl, Interrupted**
- Thora Birch in American Beauty
- Bonnie Hunt in The Green Mile
- Julianne Moore in Magnolia

=== Favorite Supporting Actor - Drama ===
- **Tom Cruise in Magnolia**
- Wes Bentley in American Beauty
- Michael Clarke Duncan in The Green Mile
- Jamie Foxx in Any Given Sunday

=== Favorite Supporting Actress - Drama/Romance ===
- **Reese Witherspoon in Cruel Intentions**
- Illeana Douglas in Message in a Bottle
- Jena Malone in For Love of the Game

=== Favorite Supporting Actor - Drama/Romance ===
- **Denis Leary in The Thomas Crown Affair**
- Paul Newman in Message in a Bottle
- Sydney Pollack in Eyes Wide Shut

=== Favorite Supporting Actress - Suspense ===
- **Toni Collette in The Sixth Sense**
- Cate Blanchett in The Talented Mr. Ripley
- Madeleine Stowe in The General's Daughter

=== Favorite Supporting Actor - Suspense ===
- **Jude Law in The Talented Mr. Ripley**
- James Cromwell in The General's Daughter
- Bruce Greenwood in Double Jeopardy

=== Favorite Actress - Newcomer ===
- **Rachael Leigh Cook in She's All That**
- Saffron Burrows in Deep Blue Sea
- Heather Donahue in The Blair Witch Project
- Carrie-Anne Moss in The Matrix
- Mena Suvari in American Pie and American Beauty

=== Favorite Actor - Newcomer ===
- **Haley Joel Osment in The Sixth Sense**
- Jason Biggs in American Pie
- Joshua Leonard in The Blair Witch Project
- Michael Williams in The Blair Witch Project
- James Van Der Beek in Varsity Blues

=== Family Favorite Film ===
- **Toy Story 2**
- Inspector Gadget
- Pokémon: The First Movie
- Stuart Little
- Tarzan

== Music ==
=== Favorite Female Artist - Pop ===
- **Cher: Believe**
- Celine Dion: All the Way ... A Decade of Song
- Sarah McLachlan: Mirrorball

=== Favorite Male Artist - Pop ===
- **Ricky Martin: Ricky Martin**
- Andrea Bocelli: Sogno
- Sting: Brand New Day

=== Favorite Group - Pop ===
- **Backstreet Boys: Millennium**
- 98 Degrees: 98 Degrees and Rising
- 'N Sync: 'N Sync

=== Favorite Artist - Rap ===
- **Dr. Dre: Dr. Dre 2001**
- Jay-Z: Vol. 2 ... Hard Knock Life
- Juvenile: 400 Degreez

=== Favorite Duo or Group - Country ===
- **Dixie Chicks: Wide Open Spaces and Fly**
- Brooks & Dunn: Greatest Hits Collection
- Lonestar: Lonely Grill

=== Favorite Male Artist - Country ===
- **Garth Brooks: Double Live and Magic of Christmas**
- Tim McGraw: A Place in the Sun
- George Strait: Always Never the Same

=== Favorite Female Artist - Country ===
- **Shania Twain: Come On Over**
- Faith Hill: Breathe & Faith
- Jo Dee Messina: I'm Alright

=== Favorite Male Artist - R&B ===
- **Brian McKnight: Back at One**
- Ginuwine: 100% Ginuwine
- R. Kelly: R.

=== Favorite Female Artist - R&B ===
- **Mariah Carey: Rainbow**
- Lauryn Hill: Miseducation of Lauryn Hill
- Whitney Houston: My Love is Your Love

=== Favorite Group - R&B ===
- **TLC: Fanmail**
- 112: Room 112
- Destiny's Child: The Writing's On The Wall

=== Favorite Artist - Modern Rock ===
- **Kid Rock: Devil Without a Cause**
- Everlast: Whitey Ford Sings the Blues
- Lenny Kravitz: 5

=== Favorite Group - Modern Rock ===
- **Limp Bizkit: Significant Other**
- The Offspring: Americana
- Smash Mouth: Astro Lounge

=== Favorite Male - New Artist ===
- **Eminem: The Slim Shady LP**
- Marc Anthony: Marc Anthony
- Lou Bega: A Little Bit of Mambo

=== Favorite Female - New Artist ===
- **Christina Aguilera: Christina Aguilera**
- Jennifer Lopez: On the 6
- Britney Spears: Baby One More Time

=== Favorite Group - New Artist ===
- **Blink-182: Enema of the State**
- B*witched: Bewitched
- Lit: A Place in the Sun

=== Favorite Latino Artist ===
- **Enrique Iglesias: Bailamos**
- Elvis Crespo: Suavemente
- Selena: All My Hits - Todos Mis Exitos

=== Favorite Artist or Group - Rock ===
- **Carlos Santana: Supernatural**
- Jimmy Buffett: Beach House On The Moon
- Phil Collins: Hits

=== Favorite Latino Group ===
- **Maná: MTV Unplugged**
- Gipsy Kings: Best of Gipsy Kings
- Los Tigres Del Norte: Herencia de Familia
- Los Tri-O: Nuestro Amor

=== Favorite CD ===
- **Backstreet Boys: Millennium**
- Limp Bizkit: Significant Other
- Ricky Martin: Ricky Martin
- Britney Spears: Baby One More Time
- Shania Twain: Come On Over

=== Favorite Single ===
- **Christina Aguilera: "Genie in a Bottle"**
- Cher: "Believe"
- Whitney Houston: "Heartbreak Hotel"

=== Favorite Soundtrack ===
- **Austin Powers: The Spy Who Shagged Me**
- Tarzan
- Wild Wild West

=== Favorite Song from a Movie ===
- **"Music of My Heart" by Gloria Estefan featuring 'N Sync from Music of the Heart**
- "When You Believe" by Mariah Carey and Whitney Houston from The Prince of Egypt
- "Bailamos" by Enrique Iglesias from Wild Wild West
- "Fortunate" by Maxwell from Life
- "Wild Wild West" by Will Smith from Wild Wild West

=== Favorite Artist - Comedy ===
- **Adam Sandler: Stan & Judy's Kid**
- Chris Rock: Bigger & Blacker
- Weird Al Yankovic: Running With Scissors

== Video games ==
=== Favorite Video Game ===
- **Super Smash Bros.**
- Army Men: Sarge's Heroes
- Driver: You Are The Wheelman
- Resident Evil 3: Nemesis
- Pokémon Yellow

=== Favorite Playstation Game ===
- **Tony Hawk's Pro Skater**
- Driver: You Are The Wheelman
- Gran Turismo 2
- Resident Evil 3: Nemesis
- Syphon Filter
- Tomorrow Never Dies

=== Favorite Nintendo 64 Game ===
- **Donkey Kong 64**
- Army Men: Sarge's Heroes
- Mario Party
- Pokémon Snap
- Star Wars Episode I: Racer
- Super Smash Bros.

=== Favorite Game Boy Game ===
- **Super Mario Bros. Deluxe**
- Pokémon Blue
- Pokémon Pinball
- Pokémon Red
- Pokémon Yellow
- Toy Story 2: Buzz Lightyear to the Rescue

=== Favorite Dreamcast Game ===
- **Sonic Adventure**
- NBA 2K
- NFL 2K
- Ready 2 Rumble Boxing
- Sega Bass Fishing
- Soul Calibur
