= Army Men: Green Rogue =

2001 video game

- North American PlayStation box art
- Developer: The 3DO Company
- Publisher: The 3DO Company
- Series: Army Men
- Platforms: PlayStation 2, PlayStation
- Release: PlayStation 2: NA: March 20, 2001; EU: April 6, 2001; PlayStation: NA: April 11, 2001; EU: April 27, 2001
- Genre: Shoot 'em up
- Modes: Single-player, multiplayer

Army Men: Green Rogue (Army Men: Omega Soldier in Europe for the PlayStation) is a 2001 shoot 'em up video game developed and published by The 3DO Company for the PlayStation 2 and PlayStation.

== Gameplay ==
The game takes the form of top-down, forward-scrolling shoot 'em up in the vein of Commando or Ikari Warriors. Unlike those games, it features a 3D environment with polygonal enemies, and the screen is constantly scrolling forward.

Green Rogue was a newcomer in a long line of Army Men games, many of which were aimed at an arguably undiscriminating juvenile audience, with fair to middling critical responses. Despite that, Green Rogue featured some atypical gameplay, including multiple upgradeable weapons with nine levels of potency, a "biostrike" smart bomb, and a supersoldier mode. However, as lamented by one of the game's designers, some of that gameplay may have been overlooked by reviewers.

== Reception ==
Reception

Aggregate score
Aggregator	Score	
Aggregator	PS	PS2
Metacritic	N/A	39/100

Review scores
Publication	Score	
Publication	PS	PS2
AllGame	1.5/5	1.5/5
Electronic Gaming Monthly	N/A	2/10 (Note: Three critics of Electronic Gaming Monthly gave the PlayStation 2 version each a score of 2/10.)
EP Daily	N/A	3.5/10
Game Informer	N/A	1/10
GameRevolution	N/A	D−
GameSpot	N/A	3.8/10
IGN	N/A	4.3/10
Jeuxvideo.com	6/20	11/20
Next Generation	N/A	2/5
Official U.S. PlayStation Magazine	N/A	2/5
PlayStation: The Official Magazine	N/A	4/10
The Cincinnati Enquirer	N/A	2/5

The PlayStation 2 version received "generally unfavorable reviews" according to the review aggregation website Metacritic.

David Chen of NextGen called it "a harmless enough diversion, but there are better ways to spend your time." David Smith of IGN complimented the FMV opening but added that once the opening movie ended the quality took "what Bill Hicks called 'a real big @#$%in' dropoff.'" He continued that everything in the game was sluggish. Tim Tracy of GameSpot was complimentary of the graphics, saying the game carried "some fairly smooth and detailed textures and is a decent game to look at", but was critical of the gameplay particularly collision detection and the constantly scrolling play field which he found made it difficult to manoeuvre to pick up power-ups and dodge enemy attacks. Human Tornado of GamePro said, "On the whole, Green Rogue is a disappointing member of the PS2's first wave of Army Men games. It's too slow to be a challenge, and the graphics don't live up to 128-bit expectations." (Note: GamePro gave the PlayStation 2 version three 2.5/5 scores for graphics, control, and fun factor, and 3/5 for sound.)
