= Army Men: World War - Team Assault =

2001 video game

- North American box art
- Developer(s): 5000ft Inc.
- Publisher(s): The 3DO Company
- Series: Army Men
- Platform(s): PlayStation
- Release: EU: November 30, 2001; NA: December 3, 2001
- Genre(s): Third-person shooter, Strategy
- Mode(s): Single-player, multiplayer

Army Men: World War - Team Assault is a 2001 third-person shooter video game developed by 5000ft Inc. and published by The 3DO Company for the PlayStation.

The player controls a squad of troops and can add special units onto them.
