= Army Men Advance =

2001 video game

- European box art
- Developer: DC Studios
- Publisher: The 3DO Company
- Producer: Julia Bond
- Composer: Robert Anderberg
- Series: Army Men
- Platform: Game Boy Advance
- Release: NA: June 5, 2001; EU: June 15, 2001
- Genre: Top-down shooter
- Modes: Single-player, multiplayer

Army Men Advance is a 2001 top-down shooter video game developed by DC Studios and published by the 3DO Company for the Game Boy Advance. Much like Army Men: Sarge's Heroes, the story has General Plastro and his army of tan figurines have decided to take over the world, and it is up to Sarge and reporter Vikki Grimm to thwart the conquest. Throughout the game, the player is required to rescue team members, infiltrate tan bases, escape from a jail, investigate an extraterrestrial presence, and retrieve communications equipment. The player can choose to play as either Sarge or Vikki, but the quests for each are identical, and once a character has been chosen, it is impossible to switch to the other unless the player wants to start again from the first mission.

In-game screenshot

== Reception ==
Reception

Aggregate score
Aggregator	Score
Metacritic	57/100

Review scores
Publication	Score
Electronic Gaming Monthly	4/10
Eurogamer	7/10
Game Informer	7/10
GameSpot	4.4/10
IGN	7/10
Jeuxvideo.com	14/20
Next Generation	3/5
Nintendo Power	3/5
Nintendo World Report	4.5/10

Army Men Advance received "mixed" reviews according to the review aggregation website Metacritic. NextGen called it "A decent, if not amazing[,] game, at least until Capcom gives us that GBA version of Commando we've been dreaming about" (which is ironic, since the Game Boy Advance version of that game does not exist). Extreme Ahab of GamePro said, "You'd have much more fun playing with genuine plastic army men than wasting your time in this virtual ghetto while straining endlessly to obtain just the right light on the god-forsaken Game Boy Advance screen. This is for franchise fanatics only." (Note: GamePro gave the game 2/5 for graphics, two 4/5 scores for sound and control, and 2.5/5 for fun factor.)
