= Army Men: World War - Land, Sea, Air =

2000 video game

- North American box art
- Developer: The 3DO Company
- Publisher: The 3DO Company
- Series: Army Men
- Platform: PlayStation
- Release: NA: September 20, 2000; EU: November 3, 2000
- Genre: Third-person shooter
- Modes: Single-player, multiplayer

Army Men: World War - Land, Sea, Air (released in Europe as Army Men: Land, Sea, Air) is a 2000 third-person shooter video game developed and published by The 3DO Company for the PlayStation.

== Gameplay ==
=== Single-player and multiplayer ===
Army Men: World War - Land, Sea, Air features two modes for single player: Campaign and Boot Camp, as well as featuring a two-player "capture the flag" multiplayer mode. The player can choose from three difficulties: Easy, medium or hard.

==== Campaign ====
The Campaign is the main mode for Army Men: World War - Land, Sea, Air. Set in a "realistic" setting like the previous Army Men, it features 15 missions in total, which involves the player (as a Green soldier) completing certain objectives that may involve intercepting vehicles, escorting friendly soldiers and killing enemies on land, sea or air. The plot begins with the Tan Army attacking the Green Army by air and the Green Army later taking revenge, with the narrator announcing: "We shall beat them on all fronts, returning force with force, whether it be by land, sea or air."

==== Boot Camp ====
Boot Camp is a training level in which the player learns the controls. It consists of training areas for all weapons and an obstacle course.

== Reception ==
Reception

Aggregate score
Aggregator	Score
Metacritic	35/100

Review scores
Publication	Score
CNET Gamecenter	4/10
Game Informer	1/10
GameSpot	6.5/10
IGN	3/10
Next Generation	3/5
Official U.S. PlayStation Magazine	1.5/5

The game received "generally unfavorable reviews" according to the review aggregation website Metacritic. IGN called it "awful" for its "shoddy controls, horrible clipping, lousy animation" and "bland grainy textures". Emmett Schkloven of NextGen, however, said of the game, "Fire up the newsreels and propaganda – the Army Men are back with a much better World War."
