= Army Men: World War - Final Front =

2001 video game

- European box art
- Developer: The 3DO Company
- Publisher: The 3DO Company
- Series: Army Men
- Platform: PlayStation
- Release: NA: February 27, 2001; EU: March 30, 2001
- Genre: Third-person shooter
- Modes: Single-player, multiplayer

Army Men: World War - Final Front (released in Europe as Army Men: Lock 'n' Load) is a 2001 third-person shooter video game developed and published by The 3DO Company for the PlayStation. It is the third installment in the World War subseries.

== Overview ==
Army Men: World War - Final Front is a third-person shooter, with the gameplay style being very much like the previous Army Men. Once again, many of the missions are modeled after World War II battles, and some battles take place in mysterious regions such as desert lands resembling Egypt and jungles similar to South America's. It also allows the player to control vehicles such as bikes, tanks, boats and submarines.

== Reception ==
Reception

Aggregate score
Aggregator	Score
Metacritic	50/100

Review scores
Publication	Score
AllGame	1.5/5
GameRevolution	F
GameSpot	6/10
IGN	4.5/10
Next Generation	2/5
Official U.S. PlayStation Magazine	1.5/5
PlayStation: The Official Magazine	3/10

The game received "mixed" reviews according to the review aggregation website Metacritic. Scott Steinberg of NextGen compared the game to the Vietnam War, calling it "a downright ugly and vicious war you just can't win." Four-Eyed Dragon of GamePro summed up his review of the game with, "If you plan to do a tour of duty with Final Front, expect an uphill battle without any shiny medals." (Note: GamePro gave the game 1.5/5 for graphics, 3/5 for sound, 3.5/5 for control, and 2.5/5 for fun factor.)
