= Army Men: Air Attack 2 =

2000 video game

- North American PlayStation 2 box art
- Developers: The 3DO Company; Wide Games (GC)
- Publisher: The 3DO Company
- Series: Army Men
- Platforms: PlayStation, PlayStation 2, GameCube
- Release: PlayStation: NA: November 6, 2000; EU: November 24, 2000; PlayStation 2: NA: March 27, 2001; EU: June 8, 2001; GameCube: NA: March 25, 2003
- Genre: Third-person shooter
- Modes: Single-player, multiplayer

Army Men: Air Attack 2 is a third-person shooter video game developed and published by The 3DO Company. It first released on the PlayStation in 2000. It was released for the PlayStation 2 the following year, under the alternate name Army Men: Air Attack - Blade's Revenge in Europe. Another variation released for the GameCube in 2003 under the name Army Men: Air Combat - The Elite Missions.

== Gameplay and premise ==
Following the events in Army Men: Air Attack and previous Army Men games, players control a helicopter in the Green Army against the Tan Army, working with character William Blade to defeat their enemies. Players can unlock abilities and weapons by collecting plastic. It features cooperative and competitive multiplayer modes. Players are accompanied by co-pilots, each of which has a special secondary weapon unique to them.

== Reception ==
Reception

Aggregate score
Aggregator	Score		
Aggregator	GameCube	PS	PS2
Metacritic	46/100	74/100	75/100

Review scores
Publication	Score		
Publication	GameCube	PS	PS2
AllGame	N/A	2.5/5	2.5/5
CNET Gamecenter	N/A	8/10	N/A
Electronic Gaming Monthly	N/A	7/10	7.83/10 (Note: In Electronic Gaming Monthly's review of the PlayStation 2 version, two critics gave it each a score of 8/10, and the other gave it 7.5/10.)
EP Daily	N/A	8.5/10	6/10
Game Informer	N/A	1/10	3.5/10
GameFan	N/A	75% (Note: In GameFan's viewpoint of the PlayStation version, three critics gave it each a score of 75, 72, and 79.)	N/A
GameRevolution	N/A	N/A	B−
GameSpot	N/A	7.2/10	6.7/10
GameZone	5.8/10	N/A	N/A
IGN	3.5/10	8.2/10	7/10
Next Generation	N/A	3/5	3/5
Nintendo Power	3.3/5	N/A	N/A
Official U.S. PlayStation Magazine	N/A	3.5/5	3.5/5
The Cincinnati Enquirer	N/A	N/A	4/5

The PlayStation 2 version received "generally favorable reviews", and the PlayStation version received "mixed or average reviews", while Air Combat - The Elite Missions received "generally unfavorable reviews", according to the review aggregation website Metacritic. Samuel Bass of NextGen said of the PlayStation version in its January 2001 issue, "This tiny plastic Apocalypse Now may be short-lived, but it's still one hell of a lot of fun." Five issues later, Jim Preston called the PS2 version "the best-looking Army Men game ever made, and it's actually pretty fun too. We're as surprised as you are."

2 Barrel Fugue of GamePro's December 2000 issue said of the PlayStation version, "Packaged with mediocre graphics and underwhelming sound, Army Men: Air Attack 2 isn't terrible, but it can't come close to those long summer days when all you needed was a sandbox and a little imagination." (Note: GamePro gave the PlayStation version two 2.5/5 scores for graphics and sound, and two 3/5 scores for control and fun factor.) Six issues later, Four-Eyed Dragon said of the PlayStation 2 version, "If you're looking for action-packed combat shooting in the skies---plastic style---sign up for a tour of duty with Air Attack 2. You won't be disappointed." (Note: GamePro gave the PlayStation 2 version three 4/5 scores for graphics, sound, and fun factor, and 4.5/5 for control.)
