= Portal Runner =

2001 video game

- North American PlayStation 2 box art
- Developers: The 3DO Company (PlayStation 2); Handheld Games (Game Boy Color)
- Publisher: The 3DO Company
- Director: John Salera
- Producer: Michael Mendheim
- Series: Army Men
- Platforms: PlayStation 2, Game Boy Color
- Release: NA: September 11, 2001; EU: October 19, 2001
- Genres: Action-adventure, platform
- Modes: Single-player, multiplayer

Portal Runner is a 2001 action-adventure platform game developed by The 3DO Company for PlayStation 2 and Handheld Games for Game Boy Color. The game is a spin-off of the Army Men video game franchise, focusing on a conflict between characters Vikki Grimm and Brigitte Bleu. Both versions were published by The 3DO Company, in the United States it was released in September, and in Europe the following month. It received a mixed reception from critics upon release.

== Gameplay ==
Portal Runner is an action-adventure and platform game played from a third-person view. The player controls Vikki Grimm, a character from the Army Men franchise. The game also includes an optional first-person view for precision shooting with a bow and arrow, Vikki's primary weapon. The player has the ability to control a new character, a lion named Leo in some levels, he is also mountable by Vikki and can be given commands such as "sit", "stay", and "attack".

The Game Boy Color version is a side-scrolling platformer adaptation of the console version.

== Plot ==
Vikki Grimm embarks on an adventure after receiving a mysterious package. Her quest takes her through various toy worlds, including a prehistoric jungle and a medieval castle. Along the way, she befriends a lion named Leo and rescues a wizard, Merlin. The villain, Brigitte Bleu, manipulates Vikki's boyfriend, Sarge, and plans to marry him using a love gun acquired from Martians in a Space World. Vikki and Leo thwart the wedding, stop an inter-dimensional attack, and return home. Brigitte ends up imprisoned, sharing a cell with General Plastro.

== Development ==
Portal Runner is a spin-off game of Army Men video game series, starring Vikki Grimm, a character who had her debut in Army Men: Sarge's Heroes (1999) and was introduced as the love interest for Sarge. The game was tentatively titled Vikki's Adventures, and was meant to be its own thing divorced from the Army Men militaristic origins. According to Michael Mendheim, they wanted to move in "completely different direction" and both the storyline and gameplay were unrelated to the larger franchise. The development team constructed three new alternate worlds consisting of a prehistoric dinosaur world, a medieval world with a life-size chessboard and an alien spaceship in order to take advantage of the improved Playstation 2 hardware. Some of the artistic influences on the art design included Vincent Van Gogh and Salvador Dali.

The Playstation 2 version was developed and published by The 3DO Company and was designed for all-ages in mind. Unlike the other Army Men games, Portal Runner is rated E for Everyone by the ESRB. John Salera was the director on the game. A new game engine was built for the game. PlayWorks, a separate division at 3DO, created the animated cutscenes using the existing game assets. The Game Boy Color version was developed by Handheld Games.

== Release ==
Video game magazine GamePro exclusively revealed the existence of the game, under the name of Vikki's Adventures, in their November 2000 issue of the magazine.

3DO showed of Portal Runner alongside a number of other announced Playstation 2 titles, at a special held event at the FAO Schwarz in San Francisco, with former Playboy Playmate Heather Kozar dressed up as the lead character. The game was featured on the cover of PSE2. It was initially slated for a 2001 spring release. Portal Runner was released in the North America on September 11, 2001, for the PlayStation 2 console and the Game Boy Color handheld. It was published in Europe a month later on October 19, 2001.

== Reception and controversy ==
Reception

Aggregate scores
| Aggregator | Score |
|---|---|
| GameRankings | (PS2) 57% (GBC) 50% |
| Metacritic | (PS2) 53/100 |

Review scores
| Publication | Score |
|---|---|
| AllGame | 2.5/5 |
| Electronic Gaming Monthly | 3.83/10 (Note: Three critics of Electronic Gaming Monthly gave the PlayStation 2 version each a score of 3/10, 5/10, and 3.5/10.) |
| Game Informer | 4/10 |
| GamePro | 2/5 |
| GameRevolution | D |
| GameSpot | 6.7/10 |
| GameSpy | 66% |
| GameZone | 7.5/10 |
| IGN | 5.4/10 |
| Nintendo Power | 2.5/5 (Note: Five critics of Nintendo Power gave the Game Boy Color version each a score of 1.5/5, 3/5, 2/5, 4/5 and 3/5.) |
| Official U.S. PlayStation Magazine | 2/5 |
| X-Play | 4/5 |
| Adrenaline Vault | 3.5/5 |

The PlayStation 2 release holds an average aggregate score of 57% at GameRankings based on 25 reviews and received "mixed" reviews according to video game review aggregator Metacritic. The Game Boy Color version received its earliest review from Nintendo Power, which gave it a score of two-and-a-half stars out of five.

The PS2 version gained notoriety when it was panned by GamePro, which was the first to review the game, saying that it "looks like a late-generation PlayStation title rather than a second-generation PS2 effort." (Note: GamePro gave the PlayStation 2 version three 2.5/5 scores for graphics, sound, and control, and 2/5 for fun factor.) Trip Hawkins, then-president of 3DO and publisher of Portal Runner, sent an angry email to John Rousseau, who was president of GamePro. The email was published on the internet in its entirety. In the email, Hawkins told Rousseau that his customers were the advertisers, not the readers, and implied that the reviews should be written to keep the advertisers happy. Hawkins wrote: "...there is something wrong with (the reviewer), not with Portal Runner. If you disagree with me, you do so at your own peril.... I should mention in passing that 3DO has been one of your largest advertisers. Effective immediately, we are going to have to cut that back."

== Sources ==
- the Snake, Jake (November 2000). "Vikki's Adventures - From the Foxhole to the Rabbit Hole". GamePro. No. 146. Oakland, California: IDG.
- "3DO'S New Babe". Official U.S. PlayStation Magazine. No. 40. San Francisco, California: Ziff Davis Media. January 2001.
- "Select Games - Portal Runner". Tips & Tricks. No. 71. Beverly Hills, California: Larry Flynt Publications. January 2001.
- "Portal Runner - Escaping the toy box". Game Informer. Vol. 9, no. 93. Minneapolis: Sunrise Publications. January 2001.
- Ibot (May 2001). "Hands-on - Portal Runner". GamePro. No. 152. San Francisco, California: IDG.
- "Portal Runner release confirmed". GameSpot. CNET. February 14, 2001. Archived from the original on June 21, 2001.
- "3DO Ships Portal Runner™". The 3DO Company. September 11, 2001. Archived from the original on October 14, 2001.
- Harris, Craig (September 12, 2001). "Portal Runner Out". IGN. Snowball. Archived from the original on December 16, 2001.
- "Portal Runner for PlayStation 2". GameRankings. CBS Interactive. Archived from the original on May 26, 2019.
- "Portal Runner for Game Boy Color". GameRankings. CBS Interactive. Archived from the original on May 22, 2019.
- "Portal Runner (PS2)". Metacritic. Fandom. Archived from the original on February 6, 2024.
- Thompson, Jon (2001). "Portal Runner (PS2) - Review". AllGame. All Media Network. Archived from the original on November 16, 2014.
- Boyer, Crispin; Kim, Jeanne; Kujawa, Kraig (November 2001). "Portal Runner (PS2)" (PDF). Electronic Gaming Monthly. No. 148. Ziff Davis.
- Helgeson, Matt (October 2001). "Portal Runner (PS2)". Game Informer. No. 102. FuncoLand. Archived from the original on February 11, 2005.
- Iron Monkey (November 2001). "Portal Runner (PS2)" (PDF). GamePro. No. 158. San Francisco, California: IDG. Archived from the original on February 3, 2005.
- Dodson, Joe (October 1, 2001). "Portal Runner Review (PS2)". GameRevolution. CraveOnline. Archived from the original on May 18, 2015.
- Alupului, Andrei (October 19, 2001). "Portal Runner (PS2)". GameSpy. GameSpy Industries. Archived from the original on November 9, 2001.
- Parrotta, Dylan (October 19, 2001). "Portal Runner Review - PlayStation 2". GameZone. Archived from the original on November 8, 2001.
- Lopez, Miguel (September 12, 2001). "Portal Runner Review (PS2)". GameSpot. CNET. Archived from the original on November 10, 2001.
- Zdyrko, David (September 24, 2001). "Portal Runner (PS2)". IGN. Imagine Media. Archived from the original on September 8, 2014.
- "Portal Runner". Nintendo Power. Vol. 144. Nintendo of America. May 2001.
- Rybicki, Joe (November 2001). "Portal Runner". Official U.S. PlayStation Magazine. p. 160.
- D'Aprile, Jason (October 19, 2001). "'Portal Runner' (PS2) Review". Extended Play. TechTV. Archived from the original on November 5, 2001.
- "UK Release Dates". EuroGamer. Eurogamer Network. October 2001. Archived from the original on October 29, 2001.
- Winding, Dave (October 2001). "Cover Story - Portal Runner". PSE2. Vol. 2, no. 1. Foster City, California: Dimension Publishing.
- Mike Laidlaw (December 13, 2001). "Portal Runner - Review". Adrenaline Vault. Archived from the original on January 17, 2005.
- Tyson, Jeff (2001). "How 3DO Creates Video Games - Developing the Game". HowStuffWorks. Archived from the original on November 13, 2001.
- "The Misery Editors Have to Endure". Gamedrool. January 7, 2005. Archived from the original on January 11, 2005.
- Stuart, Keith (January 14, 2005). "A Trip too far". The Guardian. Archived from the original on September 17, 2014.
