= Army Men: Toys in Space =

1999 video game

- Developer: The 3DO Company
- Publisher: The 3DO Company
- Series: Army Men
- Platform: Microsoft Windows
- Release: NA: October 14, 1999; EU: 1999
- Genres: First-person shooter, Real-time tactics
- Mode: Single-player

Army Men: Toys in Space, known in Europe as Army Men in Space, is a 1999 real-time tactics video game developed and published by The 3DO Company for Microsoft Windows. It is the only game in the Army Men series to feature Tina Tomorrow and the Space Aliens.

== Plot ==
The great, main war between the Green and Tan nations has whittled down to skirmishes and recon missions for both sides, leaving the soldiers little new action or unknown combat factors.

This stalemate comes to an abrupt end when a flying saucer-like spaceship from outer space crash lands deep in Tan territory (ironically, directly on top of the Tan Command Bunker). Tan troops mobilize and greet the unknown alien pilots as they exit their downed ship, but General Plastro, recognising the potential of using advanced Alien technology to their advantage, orders his men to stand down and begins discussing terms with them...

Meanwhile, Sarge is on leave from his original team and leading cadets on missions into Tan territory, completely unaware of the events unfolding with the Aliens. Soon, Green Command, finally detecting the massive increase of Tan activity around the shipwreck, send Sarge and a heavily armed commando team to destroy it. Despite countless waves of Tan soldiers, Sarge uses carefully positioned heavy artillery barrages and air support to wipe out the Tan forces, and, upon finding the empty ship, lay explosives to destroy it. Just as the ship goes up in flames, a massive Tan reinforcement battalion arrives, cutting off Sarge and his men and begin shelling his position. As the bombs explode all around them, Sarge receives a garbled transmission from an unknown person, urging them to a specific location near the base to escape, and proposes they join up before the Tan can make an alliance with the Aliens. Sarge and his men flee to the position, find a tunnel, and then escape.

Deep underground, Sarge and his men make contact with a team of intergalactic commandoes, the Galactic Army, led by Tina Tomorrow, who was also the one who sent the message, and saved them from Tan combat vehicles. As they escape through another entrance, they discover the Aliens; giant, orange-colored, black-eyed soldiers, armed with disintegrators, and narrowly escape.

As Sarge and Tina relate their stories to the Green hierarchy, Plastro, having succeeded in winning the Aliens' trust, launches an all out, Alien-reinforced attack on the Green Capital, wiping out the Green Border Units and inflicting heavy casualties with air strikes with ease. Sarge, however, rallies the scattering army units and, after saving trapped civilians from the capital, successfully escapes to a hidden location with the population and delivers them to safety, wiping out massive amounts of Tan along the way, but narrowly winning against the Aliens.

Recognizing they must take the war to the Alien Home world if they have any hope of survival, Sarge and Tina gather their remaining troops and, upon discovering a portal generator to the home world, secure it against Tan and Alien forces and use it to travel into outer space, where Tina and the other Space Rangers are engaged in war with the Aliens.

Sarge and Tina continue the fight against the Aliens, having successfully driven the Tan's new allies from the Earth, the Tan's own normal armies are falling beneath Green counterattack.

During a mission to secure intelligence on the location of the Alien Leader, Tina learns that the location of the Galactic Army HQ on the planet has been discovered, and they narrowly arrive and raise the alarm in time to drive back the attack, though heavy damage is inflicted on the base.

When the location is discovered by Tina, she and Sarge lead one final massive attack on the Aliens' Command Center, wiping out the Overlord's elite guard and killing the Overlord itself with a massive barrage of explosives, gunfire and laser-bursts. All this is witnessed by Plastro, who, along with a handful of soldiers and tanks, is on the run from the victorious Green Armies.

Meanwhile, on the Alien Home world, Sarge and Tina share a romantic night together, and Sarge and his remaining troops say their goodbyes and return to Earth, to continue battling the Tan menace, who they know isn't finished yet.

== Overview ==
Just as the Green Army have signed a treaty with Tina Tomorrow and her Space Troopers, the evil Space Aliens invade and team up with the Tan Army. Sarge's task is to help Tina and her troops destroy the Aliens.

== Reception ==
Reception

Aggregate score
Aggregator	Score
GameRankings	29%

Review scores
Publication	Score
AllGame	2.5/5
GameStar	61%
IGN	4.8/10
Jeuxvideo.com	6/20
PC Gamer (UK)	29%
PC Games (DE)	65%
PC PowerPlay	66%
PC Zone	19%

The game received unfavorable reviews according to the review aggregation website GameRankings.
