= Army Men: Sarge's Heroes 2 =

2000 video game

- North American cover art
- Developer: The 3DO Company (Note: Ported to Game Boy Color by Game Brains.)
- Publisher: The 3DO Company (Note: Some PAL region releases were published by Midas Games under the Midas Touch label.)
- Series: Army Men
- Platforms: Nintendo 64, PlayStation, Game Boy Color, PlayStation 2
- Release: September 27, 2000: Nintendo 64; NA: September 27, 2000 PlayStation; NA: November 21, 2000; EU: November 24, 2000 Game Boy Color; NA: November 22, 2000; EU: November 24, 2000 PlayStation 2; NA: March 22, 2001; EU: April 6, 2001
- Genre: Third-person shooter
- Modes: Single-player, multiplayer

Army Men: Sarge's Heroes 2 is the name of two video games published by The 3DO Company in 2000: a third-person shooter video game developed by The 3DO Company for the Nintendo 64, PlayStation, and PlayStation 2, and a Game Boy Color (GBC) product developed by Game Brains. Both are direct sequels to Army Men: Sarge's Heroes (1999), the GBC release moreso than the 3D home console game, and entries in the Army Men video game franchise (1998–2017).

Upon release, critics were burnt out by the Army Men series and were as mixed on Sarge's Heroes 2 as the first game. It was similarly described as a conceptually-good but unfinished game that, with certain improvements and downgrades, had the same pros and cons with controls, graphics, weapons, camera and gameplay as its predecessor.

== Overview ==
In-game screenshot

Sarge's Heroes 2 starts where its predecessor left off. It is announced that the capture of Field Marshal Tannenberg will end the war. Since General Plastro has disappeared, it is suggested that he has become a victim of plastrification and been trapped in the real world. The game introduces Bridgette Bleu, a spy for the Blue Nation. She has developed a serum that reverses plastrification. The player's job as Sarge and sometimes Vikki is to destroy the serum, eliminate Tan soldiers, and capture Plastro and Tannenberg (and as Sarge sometimes have to rescue Vikki as she has a knack for getting into trouble).

The game goes between Sarge's 'realistic' world and real world, in which Sarge is the size of a typical plastic Army Man soldier. It features many interactive effects, such as breakable wine bottles, bustable soda cans and music that spikes in intensity when enemies attack.

The plot of the Game Boy Color port is completely different to the console ones, involving Sarge, Riff, Scorch and Vikki trying to stop a powerful Tan Nation resurgence against the Green Nation, led by the reappearance of General Plastro. The plot of this version is still a direct sequel to Army Men: Sarge's Heroes however.

== Reception ==
Reception

Aggregate scores
Aggregator	Score			
Aggregator	GBC	N64	PS	PS2
GameRankings	N/A	48%	56%	56%
Metacritic	N/A	46/100	48/100	54/100

Review scores
Publication	Score			
Publication	GBC	N64	PS	PS2
AllGame	N/A	2/5	2/5	2/5
CNET Gamecenter	N/A	3/10	N/A	N/A
Electronic Gaming Monthly	N/A	4/10; 4/10; 4/10	N/A	6.5/10; 5/10; 4/10
EP Daily	N/A	3/10	5/10	6/10
Game Informer	N/A	N/A	N/A	5.5/10
GamePro	N/A	4/5; 3.5/5; 3.5/5; 3.5	3/5; 3.5/5; 3.5/5; 3.5/5	4.5/5; 4/5; 3.5/5; 4/5
GameRevolution	N/A	N/A	N/A	C−
GameSpot	N/A	4/10	3/10	5.5/10
IGN	5/10	5/10	4.5/10	4.5/10
Next Generation	N/A	N/A	2/5	1/5
Nintendo Power	N/A	7.1/10	N/A	N/A
Official U.S. PlayStation Magazine	N/A	N/A	2.5/5	2.5/5
VideoGamer.com	N/A	N/A	2/10	N/A
The Cincinnati Enquirer	N/A	N/A	N/A	3/5

Ratings from review aggregators like Metacritic and GameRankings were middling for all platforms, indicating a somewhat less-than-average critical reception. At release, reviewers were tired of the prolific-but-low-quality output of the Army Men franchise, and divided on whether the sequel was better or on-par with the first Sarge's Heroes game and other Army Men titles. A GameSpot PlayStation review considered it the franchise's worst. Reviews held a similar general unanimity to its predecessor: a good third-person shooter on paper that, in execution, was a mindless action game in an under-cooked state that was worth a rental at best only for fans of the previous game. Several complaints about individual aspects, such as the confusing and unresponsive controls, cumbersome movement, weapon aiming, visuals and frame-rate, were also repeats, and any improvements were reported to be "quick fixes" instead of substantial resolves.

As with the last game, critics found the action monotonous, mostly consisting of shooting one type of enemy, the tan soldiers, with only occasional deviations via rescue missions and collecting objects. Sources such as GameSpot noted the disappearance of the previous game's stealth elements, inflating the repetitive nature. Some considered the difficulty level extremely low, as a result of abundance of health and weapon power-ups and enemies with poor artificial intelligence. However, reviewers still reported cheap deaths as a result of enemies and hazards appearing on-screen suddenly, shots from soldiers off-screen, or missing gaps due to a disoriented camera. Depending on the critic, the auto-aim either latched onto enemies very easily or got significantly off-target. The collision detection was widely panned. According to some critics, the PS2 version's two-player modes ran smoothly but consisted of long stretches where each player hunts for and hides from each other on long maps.

As with the first Sarge's Heroes, the real-life environments were the game's most acclaimed aspects, fights with toy robots being a common example. Much criticism was given towards the dull and blurry textures, which were very limited in color choices, for "bleeding" together and causing hard-to-identify models. The PlayStation 2 version's graphics were considered by some to be good, by GameSpot the best-looking of the entire series. Some appreciation was given towards the port's effects, such as lighting, reflection, particles, and blur on the explosions. Some considered its controls decent as well. However, the same bugs as the other versions, such as with the occasionally-slowing-downing frame-rates, camera, controls, collision detection, clipping and pop-ups, were still reported being in the port. Reviews of the PlayStation 2 version were also irritated by an absence of mid-level saves, requiring the player to start over each level.
