= Army Men: Sarge's War =

2004 video game

- European Windows box art
- Developer: Tactical Development
- Publisher: Global Star Software
- Series: Army Men
- Engine: RenderWare
- Platforms: Windows, Xbox, PlayStation 2, GameCube
- Release: July 20, 2004: Windows; NA: July 20, 2004; EU: July 23, 2004 Xbox; EU: July 23, 2004; NA: August 2, 2004 PlayStation 2; EU: July 23, 2004 GameCube; NA: August 21, 2004
- Genre: Third-person shooter
- Modes: Single-player, multiplayer

Army Men: Sarge's War is a 2004 third-person shooter video game developed by Tactical Development and published by Global Star Software for Microsoft Windows, Xbox, PlayStation 2 and GameCube. It was initially developed by series creator The 3DO Company but after that company's bankruptcy was purchased and completed by Global Star Software. Sarge's War is a third installment in Sarge's Heroes subseries. The game is more mature and darker than earlier games in the series. Sarge makes no comical moves, holes are blown into soldiers, and the weapons are also made of metal.

== Plot ==
The game begins with an attack on Greentown by the Tan Army and Sarge battling through the war-torn city to save it. After the battle, Sarge is informed by Colonel Grimm that General Plastro and the Tan Army has surrendered and that there will be a peace ceremony later that night, but that a rogue Tan division - Operation "Vengeance" - led by Lord Malice has stolen some infantry molds and can now build an army. Sarge's mission is to find and capture Malice, recover the stolen molds, and locate a missing recon squad that hadn't returned from their mission.

Sarge arrives in the area (a beach) and battles his way to the Tan portal. There, he discovers plans indicating that Malice is planning to detonate a bomb at the peace ceremony. Malice contacts Sarge on his radio, revealing the bomb is hidden in the peace statue. Sarge charges through the portal to stop the ceremony, but he is too late - as the bomb goes off, Greentown is destroyed and Plastro, Colonel Grimm, the Heroes, Vikki and the Green and Tan armies are all killed in the explosion. Enraged at the death of his squad, Sarge then sets out to kill Malice and avenge the Heroes.

He battles his way through the remains of Greentown to another Tan portal. Upon proceeding through the portal, he finds himself in Malice's artillery base. Sarge destroys all the artillery and discovers a plastic well mine that Malice is using to build his army. Sarge floods the mine, rendering it useless. He then travels across the desert to Malice's castle. Malice is using the castle as a communication center for his air and ground forces, as well as a prison base for some of the Green army's finest men. Sarge penetrates the castle's defenses, frees the prisoners and destroys the communications tower. Discovering a passage from the castle to a kitchen in the Real World, Sarge flashes back to a time when he was in a similar kitchen, in a squad led by Major Gooding. During an exfiltration mission, Gooding and his squad were ambushed by Tan forces. During the ambush, Sarge called in an air strike and found Gooding's arm near the sink, leading him to the conclusion that Gooding was dead (unknown to Sarge, Gooding was in the sink, trying to call for help). As Sarge takes off in the helicopter, the flashback ends, and Sarge moves forth.

At the end of the game, Sarge finally reaches Lord Malice's headquarters, where he battles Malice himself. After defeating and fatally wounding Malice, Sarge asks him why he killed the Greens and Tans in Greentown. Malice chastises Sarge for not remembering. Sarge removes Malice's face mask and discovers that he was actually Major Gooding, who was accidentally left for dead all those years ago. Malice tells Sarge that after the helicopter took off with Sarge, the Tan eventually found him and changed him into the Lord Malice he is now. As he dies, Malice reveals to Sarge that since that day, he dreamt of making him suffer the way he did. At the end of the scene, Sarge is seen walking out, saying that war makes ultimately no sense.

The closing animation reveals storage tubes inscribed with the names of the deceased soldiers from Sarge's squad, killed in the Greentown attack, this indicates that Sarge's team members killed by Malice were actually clones and that the true ones are still alive somewhere in the plastic world.

== Reception ==
Computer and Video Games gave the game a mixed review; improvements on previous games included a new lock on feature as well as the ability to blow off enemy limbs, but drawbacks included sub-par graphics, repetitive gameplay and poor enemy AI.
