= Army Men 3D =

1999 video game

- North American cover art
- Developer: The 3DO Company
- Publisher: The 3DO Company
- Series: Army Men
- Platform: PlayStation
- Release: NA: March 10, 1999; EU: January 28, 2000
- Genres: Third-person shooter, first-person shooter
- Mode: Single-player

Army Men 3D is a 1999 third-person shooter video game developed and published by The 3DO Company exclusively for PlayStation.

== Reception ==
Reception

Aggregate score
Aggregator	Score
GameRankings	67.67%

Review scores
Publication	Score
GameSpot	4.6/10
IGN	7/10

The game received an average score of 67.67% at GameRankings, based on an aggregate of 10 reviews.

GameSpot awarded the game a score of 4.6 out of 10, criticizing the graphics and some gameplay elements, and insisted that the game would have benefited from more development time.

The game was the 9th best-selling game in April 1999.
