= Army Men II =

1999 video game

- North American Windows box art
- Developer: The 3DO Company
- Publisher: The 3DO Company
- Series: Army Men
- Platforms: Windows, Game Boy Color
- Release: Windows: NA: March 3, 1999; EU: March 26, 1999; Game Boy Color: NA: November 22, 2000; EU: November 24, 2000
- Genre: Real-time tactics
- Mode: Single-player

Army Men II is a 1999 real-time tactics video game developed and published by The 3DO Company for Microsoft Windows and Game Boy Color. The game differs from the first installment in that it has battles in both the "real world" and the "plastic world". It was also the first to introduce the concept of portals between the real world and their world, a topic that was expanded upon in later games.

== Plot ==
=== Background ===
In Army Men, the Tan commander Plastro, invades the green lands. At the end, Sarge races the tan forces to a portal and enters, finding himself in a kitchen. The game begins with a massive tan force including Plastro himself chasing him through the portal. Major Mylar betrays Plastro, destroys the portal as he enters it and takes control of the tan army and territories.

=== Levels ===
The game continues from the kitchen with Sarge and a small squad fighting their way across the kitchen counter, finding a portal back to the plastic Jungle (Level 1). Securing a radio installation, Sarge contacts HQ for instructions (Level 2), using which he wins a tank fight (Level 3), save a blue spy from the tan forces and escapes through an airfield (Level 4).

In search for a missing colonel in plastic tropical islands, Sarge finds soldiers from all four armies banded together in what is called "the Cult". Colonel, gone mad, is found to be the leader of this cult (Level 5). He escapes through a portal and is followed by Sarge into a front yard where he is taken out by Sarge himself (Level 6).

Sarge's plane is shot down into a plastic tropical island full of zombies created by Dr. Madd, an insane Grey scientist working for the Tan Army, who creates Cult forces by injecting different color liquids to soldiers. Sarge destroys the zombie mold factory generators (Level 7) and chases Dr. Madd to a desert where he must take out other scientists (Level 8). He then goes through another portal to a hobby table in a garage to stop several scientists from escaping back into the plastic world (Level 9). Through a portal he emerges at a forested, middle-of-nowhere tan base to fight the last enemy scientists protected by zombies, suicide bombers, etc. (Level 10)

Sarge finally attacks the tan fortress, evades a massive wave of angry soldiers, rescues the blue spy, finds a key leading to a weapon of mass destruction located in the center of the fortress. bombs and destroys it before the tans use it, and goes out through a portal (Level 11) to Mylar's HQ in a child's bedroom, crawling with tan soldiers. He takes out Major Mylar on a fortress-like playset (Level 12).

=== Epilogue ===
In the closing movie, the greens swoop in, taking out the remaining tans and enjoying a major victory for the Green Army. On top of a nightstand or dresser, General Plastro can be seen spying on them. Under his breath, he "thanks" Sarge for getting rid of Mylar, and "encourages" him to revel in his victory for now. Laughing maniacally, he says that he something special planned for the next time they meet.

An ominous scene involving Dr. Madd working on the remains of Mylar in his lab concludes the ending movie.

== Reception ==
Reception

Aggregate score
Aggregator	Score	
Aggregator	GBC	PC
GameRankings	N/A	56%

Review scores
Publication	Score	
Publication	GBC	PC
AllGame	3/5	4/5
CNET Gamecenter	N/A	7/10
Computer Games Strategy Plus	N/A	3/5
Computer Gaming World	N/A	2.5/5
EP Daily	N/A	6/10
GamePro	N/A	2.5/5
GameSpot	N/A	6.9/10
IGN	7/10	4.4/10
Next Generation	N/A	3/5
PC Accelerator	N/A	7/10
PC Gamer (US)	N/A	68%

The PC version received mixed reviews according to the review aggregation website GameRankings. However, the Game Boy Color version was met with slightly more positive reception than the PC version. Next Generation said of the same PC version, "If you can overlook the flaws, Army Men II is a guilty pleasure."
