= Army Men: World War =

2000 video game

- North American PlayStation box art
- Developer: The 3DO Company
- Publisher: The 3DO Company
- Series: Army Men
- Platforms: PlayStation, Windows
- Release: PlayStation: NA: April 3, 2000; EU: July 7, 2000; Windows: NA: May 2, 2000; EU: July 7, 2000
- Genres: Third-person shooter, real-time tactics
- Modes: Single-player, multiplayer

Army Men: World War (Army Men: Operation Meltdown in Europe) is a 2000 third-person shooter (real-time tactics in the Microsoft Windows version) video game developed and published by The 3DO Company for PlayStation and Windows.

== Reception ==
Reception

Aggregate score
Aggregator	Score	
Aggregator	PC	PS
GameRankings	58%	48%

Review scores
Publication	Score	
Publication	PC	PS
AllGame	2.5/5	2/5
Computer Gaming World	2.5/5	N/A
Electronic Gaming Monthly	N/A	2.5/10
EP Daily	8/10	4.5/10
Game Informer	N/A	2/10
GameSpot	N/A	5.8/10
IGN	4/10	4.5/10
Joystick	40%	N/A
Official U.S. PlayStation Magazine	N/A	1.5/5

The PC version received mixed reviews, while the PlayStation version received unfavorable reviews, according to the review aggregation website GameRankings.
