= Army Men: RTS =

2002 video game

- Developers: Pandemic Studios; Coyote Developments (GC)
- Publishers: The 3DO Company; Global Star Software (GC)
- Series: Army Men
- Platforms: PlayStation 2, Windows, GameCube
- Release: PlayStation 2: NA: March 26, 2002; EU: May 24, 2002; Windows: NA: March 26, 2002; EU: May 31, 2002; GameCube: NA: November 2, 2004
- Genre: Real-time strategy
- Modes: Single-player, multiplayer

Army Men: RTS is a 2002 real-time strategy video game developed by Pandemic Studios and published by The 3DO Company for PlayStation 2 and Microsoft Windows. The GameCube version was published by Global Star Software and developed by Coyote Developments. The game follows Sarge and his Heroes in the Green Army as they fight the Tan Army across a variety of battlefields, over the course of 15 campaign missions, eight special operations missions, and eight "Great Battles". The special operations missions are absent from the PC release. The game was the final Army Men game from The 3DO Company.

The player controls the Green Army across common household settings to collect plastic and electricity in order to build units to defeat the Tan opponent. The plot is inspired by the movie Apocalypse Now and contains many pop culture references as the team of Green commandos must hunt down a rogue and apparently insane colonel, Colonel Blintz.

== Gameplay ==
Several paratroopers attack a tower as reinforcements drop in. A few large pieces of plastic are visible where other Tan units were destroyed.

The gameplay of Army Men: RTS requires the acquisition and extraction of two resources to build structures and units: plastic and electricity. Plastic is required for every construct and is taken from objects such as Frisbees, dog bowls and toys strewn across levels ranging from a front yard to a kitchen counter, as well as a basement and attic. On destruction of a plastic object, a lump of plastic is left behind until a dump truck, the collector of plastic and electricity, slugs by and vacuums it. Electricity is drawn from batteries, toasters and walkie-talkies. Construction and upgrades of most buildings and some soldiers are contingent on some buildings having been built. For instance, at the onset of the game the resource depot, the processing facility, must be built so that dump trucks have somewhere to unload their collections.

Players use their resources to construct buildings and units. Because both factions have access to the same units, or infantry and vehicles, advantage lies at how they're used. Some buildings assemble vehicles and produce soldiers and others provide defense. Production buildings can be upgraded to produce better units. Infantry troops are cheap to produce but are not as tough, while vehicles tend to be costly. Vehicles range from dump trucks and base-building bulldozers to helicopters, tanks and half-tracks to Dum-dums, suicidal robots armed with firecrackers. Aside from grunts and grenadiers, infantry units have a special tasks: Minesweepers defuse mines, snipers are deadly from distance and mortar men, especially three or more, rain ruination on buildings in short order.

Due to the nature of each unit, players must counter whatever they are facing. Without breaking a sweat, a cadre of snipers could wipe out a battalion of grunts, but snipers would be helpless against a half-track. Countering the half-track with a tank would leave a weakness to choppers. Players must balance strengths and weaknesses of their forces and their opponent's forces with the cost of producing the units.

Level balance can be changed by other factors. Power-ups, which can improve the speed, restore the health, or increase the damage of whichever side finds them first, cause a disparity between the sides. Heroes, powerful versions of the regular infantry, possess greater durability and can cause great substantially more damage than their cohorts before being destroyed. Insects, chiefly ants, act as free units for whichever side is allied with them. The secondary objectives of some single player missions often deal with one of these things.

== Plot ==
Army Men RTS begins as the apparently insane Colonel Blintz of the Green army has "turned Tan" by painting himself and soldiers under his command. He has also taken control of a suburban home, turning it into his personal fortress. Sarge is called upon by Colonel Grimm to take it back.

After first gaining access to the front yard, Sarge is accompanied by various members of Bravo Company who secure the front yard by destroying a garden light providing electrical energy to Blintz's factories. They proceed to lead an assault on the Tan-held front door only to find it locked. Grimm contacts Sarge via radio and tells him they can enter the house though a basement window. After destroying a base by the window, Sarge and the heroes jump down into the basement.

Once in the basement Sarge is joined by Riff, Scorch, Hoover, Thick, and newcomer Bullseye. Colonel Grimm radios Sarge and tells him that Blintz has sent bombers to destroy the entire basement, initiating a timer by which the Green commandos must reach the stairs. They quickly make their way to the stairs, fighting Tan and fire ants along the way, and escape before the bombers arrive. Up the stairs is the kitchen where Sarge is immediately tasked with rebuilding a base underneath the table that has just been overrun. The Green army destroys Tan anti-air emplacements in the far corners of the kitchen before being airlifted to the counter-top. He then leads the Green army in an attack on a factory Blintz has built in the sink before moving into the living room.

In the living room the Green army secures a PlayStation 2 (a karaoke machine on the GameCube version) which the Tan have been using as an unlimited energy source. Upon securing the Tan base surrounding the energy unit, Blintz sends bombers to destroy it so as not to be used by the Green troops. Blintz then speaks to Sarge via the living room television for the first time, saying that he does not consider them a threat; indeed, sees them as playthings. Bravo Company leaves the destroyed energy unit and moves to the foot of the in-house stairs where they build another base and escort plastic villagers to safety across the living room.

Sarge and his heroes climb the stairs where they make their way across a bathroom sink whilst being ruthlessly pursued by ants. On the other side of the sink they jump down only to be captured upon entering the next room. Only the cowardly minesweeper Hoover manages to evade capture. He is radioed by Colonel Grimm, who convinces him to take hold of his nerves and free Sarge and the captured heroes. Hoover rallies an army and defeats the Tan base to free the heroes and gain their respect.

Bravo Company makes it into the attic, and destroys a model train bridge Blintz is using to transport resources into his base for his army. They make their way farther into the attic to find Vikki is already there, having hitched a ride with the air cavalry. Vikki tells them about a train they can take farther into the attic, and the heroes fight their way to the train. During their trek across the attic Sarge discovers the Tan have been holding the ant queen in a mason jar, thus explaining why they have been ruthlessly pursued by fire ants throughout their missions while the ants have left the Tan alone. Sarge can choose whether or not to free her and thus befriend the ants; either way, the Green fight their way to Blintz's main base.

In the final location Blintz barricades himself in his fortress, and the Green Army must flush him out. A harrowing final battle ensues with the Green army holding off an initial attack, destroying the Tan bases surrounding the fortress, and then destroying the fortress itself, which has been outfitted with poison gas and other powerful defensive weapons. Upon destroying the defenses and Blintz's protective bubble within it, the Green army is successful. In the final cutscene Sarge rolls up his sleeves and follows a fleeing Blintz into a nearby Tan tent, promising to "peel some of that paint off him." Colonel Grimm congratulates Sarge via radio, promising "cake and ice cream" when he returns.

=== Multiplayer ===
The PC version of Army Men: RTS allows for multiplayer with up to eight people. A copy of GameSpy Arcade was bundled with the game. Players can team up in multiplayer matches, or the battle can be a free-for-all. Victory occurs when the opposing side has no headquarters and cannot build one in three minutes. Aside from GameSpy Arcade, connections can be made on a LAN, or through a direct connection between players.

== Reception ==
Reception

Aggregate score
Aggregator	Score
Metacritic	(PS2) 68/100 (PC) 67/100 (GC) 65/100

Review scores
Publication	Score
AllGame	3/5
Electronic Gaming Monthly	6.5/10
Game Informer	6/10
GamePro	2.5/5
GameRevolution	B−
GameSpot	(PS2) 7.8/10 (PC) 7.1/10 (GC) 6.9/10
GameSpy	72%
GameZone	8.5/10
IGN	(PC) 7.7/10 (PS2) 5.4/10
Nintendo Power	3.8/5
Official U.S. PlayStation Magazine	4/5
PC Gamer (US)	57%

Army Men: RTS received "mixed or average" reviews, according to video game review aggregator Metacritic.
