= Army Men: Air Attack =

1999 video game

- North American PlayStation box art
- Developer: The 3DO Company (Note: Ported to Game Boy Color by Fluid Studios and ported to Microsoft Windows by Aqua Pacific.)
- Publisher: The 3DO Company
- Series: Army Men
- Platforms: PlayStation, Nintendo 64, Game Boy Color, Windows
- Release: November 3, 1999: PlayStation; NA: November 3, 1999; EU: March 2000 Nintendo 64; NA: July 18, 2000 Game Boy Color; NA: November 22, 2000; EU: November 24, 2000 Windows; EU: June 22, 2001
- Genre: Third-person shooter
- Modes: Single-player, multiplayer

Army Men: Air Attack (Army Men: Air Combat for the Nintendo 64 and Game Boy Color versions) is a 1999 third-person shooter video game developed and published by The 3DO Company for PlayStation, Nintendo 64, Game Boy Color and Microsoft Windows. The game focuses on aerial combat and features the protagonist, Cpt. William Blade. It is one of the first Army Men games to be powered by a 3D engine where terrain and units are rendered in real-time.

== Overview ==
In Army Men: Air Attack, the evil Tan army is making a move into Green territory. Only one man has the ability to stop their advance: Captain William Blade of the Alpha Wolf Squadron. Blade and his ragtag crew of chopper pilots fly in one of four choppers Huey, Chinook, Super Stallion, or Apache through 16 missions of plastic carnage, going through perilous settings like the "Backyard" and the "Picnic".

== Plot ==
The Green and Tan armies are once again at war, this time by air. Players can select either the Huey, Chinook, Super Stallion, or the Apache. In addition to the Tan Army are hordes of insects that players must also fight off. Players must protect tanks, trucks, other helicopters, a train, a teddy bear, and a UFO.

The players pilot one of four helicopters through the treacherous terrain of the backyard, picnic areas, and nearby beaches, engaging in Air-to-Air and Air-to-Ground combat with enemies ranging from battleships to butterflies. They can utilise the unique abilities of each airship to capture giant Teddy Bears, blow up sand castles, and save Sarge from being melted by kids with a magnifying glass. The main character is a Green Air Cavalry pilot named Captain William Blade. This game has over 12 missions with three extra choppers to unlock. The first helicopter is a Huey, then a Chinook, a Super Stallion, and finally an Apache. There are also three extra co-pilots to unlock. The first pilot is 'Woodstock', then 'Rawhide', next is 'Hardcore', and lastly Sergeant Hawk. Captain William Blade, the leader of the newly formed Alpha Wolf Battalion, does battle against the Tan empire in both the real world and plastic world.

An extra co-pilot, ‘Bombshell’ (addressed as Felicity in-game), can be unlocked after beating the game's campaign.

== Reception ==
Reception

Aggregate scores
Aggregator	Score		
Aggregator	GBC	N64	PS
GameRankings	65%	78%	71%
Metacritic	N/A	77/100	N/A

Review scores
Publication	Score		
Publication	GBC	N64	PS
AllGame	N/A	N/A	3.5/5
CNET Gamecenter	N/A	8/10	7/10
Electronic Gaming Monthly	N/A	N/A	6.375/10 (Note: In Electronic Gaming Monthly's review of the PlayStation version, two critics gave it each a score of 6/10, one gave it 7/10, and the other gave it 6.5/10.)
EP Daily	N/A	6.5/10	7/10
Game Informer	N/A	7.5/10	6.75/10
GameFan	N/A	69%	85% (Note: In GameFan's viewpoint of the PlayStation version, three critics gave it each a score of 81, 85, and 88.) (G.H.) 80%
GameSpot	N/A	7.5/10	7.5/10
IGN	7/10	7.6/10	8/10
N64 Magazine	N/A	83%	N/A
Next Generation	N/A	N/A	3/5
Nintendo Power	3/5	7.1/10	N/A
PlayStation Official Magazine – UK	N/A	N/A	5/10
Official U.S. PlayStation Magazine	N/A	N/A	4/5

The Nintendo 64 version received "generally favorable reviews" according to the review aggregation website Metacritic. Jeff Lundrigan of NextGen said of the PlayStation version, "It's got lots of cool ideas and good looks. All it needs is more levels, better gameplay balance, and a faster pace." However, Pete Wilson of Official UK PlayStation Magazine said of the same console version, "All things considered, the game's few decent touches, like being able to pick up objects with a grappling hook, are just way too limited to make you want to carry on. Abort mission..."

Four-Eyed Dragon of GamePro said of the PlayStation version in one review, "Cadets new to the squad may enjoy Air Attack's simple, gung-ho gameplay, which lacks any heavy strategizing. But for generals who expect more bang for the buck, Army Men: Air Attack is a war that should be first fought at the local rental store." (Note: GamePro gave the PlayStation version two 3.5/5 scores for graphics and fun factor, 4.5/5 for sound, and 5/5 for control in one review.) Scary Larry said that the same console version was "just like the Army reserves - good for a weekend, but a little boring in the long run." (Note: GamePro gave the PlayStation version three 3.5/5 scores for graphics, sound, and fun factor, and 4/5 for control in another review.) Vicious Sid said of the Nintendo 64 version in one review, "Although mundane Campaign missions and slowdown nearly clip this bird's wings, the hilarious multiplayer games make Air Combat a worthy weekend rental. It's hardly a breath of fresh air, but fans of EA's Strike series should definitely fly these unfriendly skies." (Note: GamePro gave the Nintendo 64 version two 4/5 scores for graphics and fun factor, 3.5/5 for sound, and 4.5/5 for control in one review.) The D-Pad Destroyer said of the same console version in another review, "It's a pleasure to be able to say that Army Men Air Combat is a good game. While it's not the best game ever on the N64, it's easy to recommend it for chopper-action fans and folks who are dying for a decent military shooter on the Fun Machine. It looks like the little green men over at 3DO have finally found the secret to bringing toys to life." (Note: GamePro gave the Nintendo 64 version 3.5/5 for graphics, two 4/5 scores for sound and fun factor, and 4.5/5 for control in another review.)
