= Army Men =

Video game series featuring toy soldiers

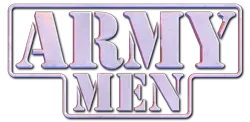
- Developers: The 3DO Company (1998–2003); Global Star Software (2003–2007); Twistbox Games (2008) (Mobile Ops); Volcanic Force Studio (2017) (Army Men Strike)
- Publishers: The 3DO Company (1998–2003); Global Star Software (2003–2007); Connect2Media (2008) (Mobile Ops); Volcanic Force Studio (2017) (Army Men Strike)
- Composers: Jason Tai (Army Men: Sarge's Heroes 2); Barry Blum (Army Men 2, Sarge's Heroes, Toys in Space, Army Men 3D); Brian Min (Army Men: Air Tactics)
- Platforms: Windows; Game Boy Color; PlayStation; Nintendo 64; PlayStation 2 Dreamcast; Game Boy Advance; GameCube; Xbox; Wii; Nintendo DS; Mobile; OS X Android iOS
- First release: Army Men; April 30, 1998
- Latest release: Army Men Strike; 2017
- Spin-offs: Portal Runner

Army Men is a series of video games originally developed by The 3DO Company and then by Global Star Software. It is based on various conflicts between four kinds of plastic army men, distinguished by their color: the Green, the Tan, the Blue, and the Grey. Two other factions, the Red and the Orange, as well as a much smaller army, the Black, also contribute to the story. Two additional factions, the Galactic Army and the Alien Army, were introduced in Army Men: Toys in Space.

== History ==
=== Studio 3DO era ===
The idea of a strategy game using plastic army men arose from the developers' desire to avoid censorship issues with the Unterhaltungssoftware Selbstkontrolle ratings board when publishing the game in Germany. Chris Wilson, producer of the original Army Men, explained:

The Germans are extremely uptight about realistic violence, so Command & Conquer, for instance, changed all its units into robots and changed some of the cut scenes. But we didn't want to have to do two versions, and very early on in the design process we'd been planning things out with little plastic army men, so we suddenly realized that this was what everyone always likens a game like this to anyway!

Army Men used cutscenes done in the style of Movietone News clips.

=== Global Star era ===
Army Men: RTS was the final game in the series to be released by The 3DO Company. Their major franchises were auctioned off when the company filed for bankruptcy, and Army Men was purchased by Crave Entertainment.

In 2004, Global Star Software published Sarge's War. The PlayStation 2 and Xbox versions were completed by some members of the original Sarge's War development team from 3DO. Global Star then released Army Men: Major Malfunction for the Xbox and PlayStation 2, and planned a Nintendo DS version, which was not released. Both Major Malfunction and Soldiers of Misfortune were unfavorably received by critics. Army Men: Mobile Ops was released for mobile phones in 2010. The series is currently owned by 2K after buying out Global Star in 2007.

=== Other games ===
A fan made Army Men III was under development by Neotl Empire, but was cancelled and resulted in an open source release of the unfinished game in April 2018. In December 2017, a licensed mobile game in the series was made by Volcano Force Studios under license from 2K Play under title Army Men: Strike that incorporates characters from the Sarge's Heroes subseries. As of 2025 The game has since been re-titled as Toy Wars (stylized in all caps), indicating that the license to use the Army Men title might have been discontinued by 2K.

== Games ==
Title	Release date	Platforms	Genre	Notes
Army Men	1998	Microsoft Windows, Game Boy Color	Real-time tactics	
Army Men II	1999	Microsoft Windows, Game Boy Color	Real-time tactics	
Army Men 3D	1999	PlayStation	Third-person shooter	
Army Men: Sarge's Heroes	1999	Nintendo 64, PlayStation, Dreamcast, Microsoft Windows	Third-person shooter	The first installment in the Sarge's Heroes subseries.
Army Men: Toys in Space	1999	Microsoft Windows	Real-time tactics	Known in Europe as Army Men in Space.
Army Men: Air Attack	1999	PlayStation, Nintendo 64, Game Boy Color, Microsoft Windows	Third-person shooter	The Nintendo 64 and Game Boy Color versions are retitled Army Men: Air Combat.
Army Men: World War	2000	PlayStation, Microsoft Windows	Third-person shooter ^{(PS)} Real-time tactics ^{(WIN)}	The first installment in the World War subseries. Titled Army Men: Operation Meltdown in PAL regions.
Army Men: Air Tactics	2000	Microsoft Windows	Real-time tactics	
Army Men: World War - Land, Sea, Air	2000	PlayStation	Third-person shooter	The second installment in the World War subseries. Titled Army Men: Land, Sea, Air in PAL regions.
Army Men: Sarge's Heroes 2	2000	Nintendo 64, Game Boy Color, PlayStation, PlayStation 2	Third-person shooter	
Army Men: Air Attack 2	2000	PlayStation, PlayStation 2, GameCube	Third-person shooter	Titled Army Men: Air Attack - Blade's Revenge in PAL regions. The GameCube version is retitled Army Men: Air Combat - The Elite Missions.
Army Men: World War - Final Front	2001	PlayStation	Third-person shooter	The third installment in the World War subseries. Titled Army Men: Lock 'n' Load in PAL regions.
Army Men: Green Rogue	2001	PlayStation 2, PlayStation	Shoot 'em up	Titled Army Men: Omega Soldier in PAL regions for the PlayStation.
Army Men Advance	2001	Game Boy Advance	Top-down shooter	
Portal Runner	2001	PlayStation 2, Game Boy Color	Platform	Spin-off of the Sarge's Heroes subseries.
Army Men: World War - Team Assault	2001	PlayStation	Third-person shooter	The fourth and last installment in the World War subseries. Titled Army Men: Team Assault in PAL regions.
Army Men: Operation Green	2001	Game Boy Advance	Isometric shooter	
Army Men: RTS	2002	PlayStation 2, Microsoft Windows, GameCube	Real-time strategy	A 3D real time strategy game.
Army Men: Turf Wars	2002	Game Boy Advance	Isometric shooter	
Army Men: Sarge's War	2004	Microsoft Windows, PlayStation 2, Xbox, GameCube	Third-person shooter	The third and last installment in the Sarge's Heroes subseries.
Army Men: Major Malfunction	2006	Xbox, PlayStation 2	Third-person shooter	
Army Men: Soldiers of Misfortune	2008	Wii, Nintendo DS, PlayStation 2	Third-person shooter	
Army Men: Mobile Ops	2010	Mobile	Isometric shooter	
Army Men Strike: Toy Wars	2017	Mobile	Real-time strategy	As of 2025, the game has been retitled simply Toy Wars.

== Reception ==
During its later years, the Army Men series was criticized by X-Play and Seanbaby of EGM, for the frequency and declining quality of each new title. The Official UK PlayStation Magazine awarded six games in the series a score of 3/10 or less.

3DO released over 24 games within 10 years, leading to speculation that the company was rushing production, with little time and effort put into each title. Former creative director Michael Mendheim said in 2021 that after the success of the early Army Men games, the executives at 3DO pressured the team to ship a new game every quarter. 3DO co-founder and designer Trip Hawkins even wrote a letter to GamePro magazine to defend Portal Runner's harsh reception, describing the editors as “angry young men” and threatening to reduce their advertising.
