= Army Men (video game) =

1998 video game

- North American Windows box art
- Developer: The 3DO Company
- Publisher: The 3DO Company
- Producer: Nicholas Earl
- Designer: Keith Bullen
- Programmer: Nicky Robinson
- Artists: Keith Bullen; Walter Ianneo
- Series: Army Men
- Platforms: Windows, Game Boy Color
- Release: Windows: NA: April 30, 1998; EU: 1998; Game Boy Color: NA: February 25, 2000; EU: 2000
- Genre: Real-time tactics
- Mode: Single-player

Army Men is a 1998 real-time tactics video game developed and published by The 3DO Company for Microsoft Windows and Game Boy Color.

== Plot ==
The game centers around a Green Army soldier known as Sarge John Green. At the beginning of the game, Sarge is tasked with a recon mission on the front line - to locate some documents - which takes place in 3 regions: Desert, Alpine and Bayou. At the end of the game, Sarge finds a strange portal that leads to the next dimension - the Real World - and the next game.

== Development ==
Army Men was originally in development for the Panasonic M2, but that version was never released due to the system's cancellation. The game was showcased at E3 1997.

== Reception ==
Reception

Aggregate score
Aggregator	Score	
Aggregator	GBC	PC
GameRankings	75%	61%

Review scores
Publication	Score	
Publication	GBC	PC
AllGame	3/5	N/A
CNET Gamecenter	N/A	4/10
Computer Games Strategy Plus	N/A	3.5/5
Computer Gaming World	N/A	3/5
Edge	N/A	4/10
EP Daily	N/A	7.5/10
Eurogamer	N/A	6/10
GameRevolution	N/A	D+
GameSpot	6.9/10	7/10
IGN	8/10	4/10
Next Generation	N/A	3/5
Nintendo Power	5.9/10	N/A
PC Gamer (US)	N/A	77%

The Game Boy Color version received favorable reviews, while the PC version received mixed reviews, according to the review aggregation website GameRankings. Next Generation called the latter version "a solid, fun example of the genre, and anyone looking for a new strategy game with a very nice graphic twist should seriously consider this."
