= Nicky Robinson (game programmer) =

Computer game programmer

- Education: University of California Santa Cruz; Pomona College
- Occupations: Software developer Video game programmer
- Years active: 1985-2018
- Known for: Mail Order Monsters; Army Men

Nicky Robinson is an American video game programmer and software developer. Her career spanned over thirty years, extending back to titles such as Star Control and Mail Order Monsters, which she worked on with Evan Robinson and game designer Paul Reiche III. Robinson later worked at 3DO as a game programmer and on the Android software as a release manager on the Skype team at Microsoft.

Robinson helped start the Game Developer's Conference as an offshoot of the Journal of Computer Game Design. She later served in the board of the conference.

Robinson's work has been published by Electronic Arts, Activision, Accolade, and 3DO.

Robinson had been active in the organization and leadership of Women in Games International, a group dedicated to involving more women in professional game development and to advancing their careers.

== Games ==
- Dora the Explorer: Animal Adventures (2003)
- BattleTanx (1999)
- Army Men (1998)
- 3DO Games: Decathlon (1996)
- Killing Time (1995)
- Centurion: Defender of Rome (1990)
- Star Control (1990)
- The Last Ninja (1988)
- World Tour Golf (1986)
- Mail Order Monsters (1985)
