= Zhadnost: The People's Party =

1995 video game

- Developer: Studio 3DO
- Publisher: Studio 3DO
- Platform: 3DO
- Release: NA: 1995
- Genre: Party
- Mode: Multiplayer

Zhadnost: The People's Party is a video game developed and published by British company Studio 3DO for the 3DO.

== Gameplay ==
Zhadnost: The People's Party is a game show consisting of several simple contests, involving full motion video for contestants and cutscenes.

== Development and release ==
Zhadnost: The People’s Party was developed by Studio 3DO for the company's 3DO Interactive Multiplayer console. It is the sequel to Twisted: The Game Show with both games being designed and directed by industry veteran Jim Eisenstein. Zhadnost was originally called The All New People’s Game Show when it was announced in early 1995. "Zhadnost" (жадность) is the Russian word for "greed". The term "party" in the title is a pun of its meanings for hosted celebration and a political organization, as the game largely parodies stereotypical views of communism and the former Soviet Union. This was one of only a handful of projects worked on by Kurt Kaufman for the developer, who served as the game's computer graphics art director. Kaufman claimed that Zhadnost was an exception to The 3DO Company's resistance to deviate from creating products within popular genres at the time including fighting, shooting, and sports. "Zhadnost was actually somewhat experimental, I thought," he said. "It was a little bit of a success story that that got finished and sold and published." Zhadnost was one of the few 3DO exclusives to have its soundtrack released commercially. Composed by George Sanger, it was featured on his album Surf.com.

== Reception ==
Reception

Review scores
Publication	Score
Edge	3/10
GamePro	17.5/20
Next Generation	3/5
3DO Magazine	3/5
The Electric Playground	7/10
Game Players	70%
Games World	74%
Game Zero Magazine	42.5/50
Strana Igr	4/10
VideoGames	8/10

Next Generation reviewed the 3DO version of the game, rating it three stars out of five, and stated that "It makes a great party game, but wears thin too quickly."
