= World Destruction League: Thunder Tanks =

2000 video game

- North American PlayStation 2 cover art
- Developer: The 3DO Company
- Publisher: The 3DO Company
- Platforms: PlayStation 2 PlayStation; Game Boy Color
- Release: September 28, 2000: PlayStation; NA: September 28, 2000; EU: November 17, 2000 Game Boy Color; NA: December 8, 2000; EU: April 6, 2001 PlayStation 2; NA: December 19, 2000; EU: March 30, 2001
- Genre: Car Combat
- Modes: Single-player, multiplayer

World Destruction League: Thunder Tanks is a car combat shooter game.

== Gameplay ==
Like Twisted Metal and Vigilante 8, the player must obtain "powerups" and defeat enemy vehicles, but must capture the enemy flags in order to win. However, all of the vehicles are tanks, hence its name. The game itself is short, making it quite unpopular among gamers. It was also one of the first PlayStation 2 titles to be released. It is considered a spiritual successor to the Battletanx series, since it has similar gameplay to that as well, and is made by the same company, The 3DO Company. Also a mototank from Battletanx: Global Assault can be seen in the opening title sequence, and many of the playable tanks are inspired or directly copied from Battletanx. A reversed M-80 (only in the PS1 version of Battletanx: Global Assault) can also be seen in game as the unplayable AI controlled Skorpion Bomb Tank.

== Reception ==
Reception

Aggregate scores
| Aggregator | Score | | |
| Aggregator | GBC | PS | PS2 |
|---|---|---|---|
| GameRankings | 56% | 34% | 68% |
| Metacritic | N/A | 35/100 | 65/100 |

Review scores
| Publication | Score | | |
| Publication | GBC | PS | PS2 |
|---|---|---|---|
| AllGame | N/A | N/A | 3/5 |
| CNET Gamecenter | N/A | 3/10 | 4/10 |
| Electronic Gaming Monthly | N/A | 2/10 | 7.17/10 (Note: Three critics of Electronic Gaming Monthly gave the PlayStation 2 version each a score of 7/10, 6.5/10, and 8/10.) |
| EP Daily | N/A | 2/10 | 7/10 |
| Game Informer | N/A | 3/10 | 7/10 |
| GameFan | N/A | 55% | N/A |
| GameRevolution | N/A | N/A | D+ |
| GameSpot | N/A | 2.6/10 | 7.2/10 |
| GameSpy | N/A | N/A | 75% |
| IGN | 4/10 | 3.5/10 | 8/10 |
| Next Generation | N/A | 1/5 | 2/5 |
| Nintendo Power | 3/5 | N/A | N/A |
| Official U.S. PlayStation Magazine | N/A | 0.5/5 | 3/5 |

The PlayStation 2 version received "mixed" reviews, while the PlayStation version received "unfavorable" reviews, according to the review aggregation website Metacritic. Emmett Schkloven of NextGen said in its January 2001 issue that the latter console version was "Not even worth the price of gas it would take to drive to the video store to rent it." Three issues later, Eric Bratcher said that the former console version "fails to innovate. It misses the brass ring simply because it doesn't bother reaching for it." Uncle Dust of GamePro said of the same console version, "3DO has stripped away everything engaging from BattleTanx, while increasing the carnage to mind-blowing proportions. WDL's single-player gameplay is sadly lacking, and the multiplayer games pale in comparison to stellar fragfests like TimeSplitters or Unreal Tournament." (Note: GamePro gave the PlayStation 2 version two 3.5/5 scores for graphics and control, 2/5 for sound, and 2.5/5 for fun factor.)
