= World Tour Golf =

1986 video game

- Publisher: Electronic Arts
- Designers: Evan Robinson; Nicky Robinson; Paul Reiche III
- Platforms: Commodore 64, Amiga, Apple IIGS, MS-DOS
- Release: 1986
- Genre: Sports
- Mode: Single-player

World Tour Golf is a sports video game by Evan Robinson, Nicky Robinson, and Paul Reiche III which was published by Electronic Arts in 1986 for Commodore 64, Amiga, Apple IIGS, and MS-DOS.

== Development ==
After completing Mail Order Monsters in 1985, developers and producers at EA were playing Nintendo Golf, and the Robinsons decided to create a golf game for MS-DOS including a golf course editor.

Evan Robinson worked on the game and graphics code (which was adapted from code written by Dan Silva for an internal EA editor named Prism, which eventually became Deluxe Paint) for World Tour Golf, while Nicky Robinson created the editor and Paul Reiche acted as game designer and artist. In 1986 it was unusual for a game to have more than one programmer, and this gave them an easy way to neatly subdivide the work. It also allowed World Tour Golf to be a significantly larger game in scope than many contemporary titles. The editor supported the accurate (for its day) re-creation of real golf courses, as well as comical courses that were made up of a series of islands, 270-degree doglegs, etc. This followed in the spirit of Racing Destruction Set, which had been developed at EA the year before.

== Reception ==
COMPUTE! called World Tour Golf "a great game for the novice and the expert". The game was reviewed in 1988 in Dragon #132 by Hartley, Patricia, and Kirk Lesser in "The Role of Computers" column. The reviewers gave the game 4½ out of 5 stars.

David M. Wilson and Johnny L. Wilson reviewed the game for Computer Gaming World, and stated that "IBM owners with CGA used to have to play with magenta trees and blue fairways, but a revision has corrected that aesthetic problem and supports EGA, as well. The EGA version still offers only the four best colors, however."
