= WarJetz =

2001 video game

- Developer: The 3DO Company
- Publisher: The 3DO Company
- Directors: Kudo Tsunoda (Executive), Amber Long (Senior), Howard Scott Warshaw
- Platforms: PlayStation, PlayStation 2
- Release: EU: May 25, 2001 (PS); NA: June 27, 2001; WW: July 27, 2001 (PS2)
- Genre: Air combat simulation
- Modes: Single-player, multiplayer

WarJetz (sometimes called World Destruction League: WarJetz) is an air combat arcade game developed and published by The 3DO Company and released in 2001 on the PlayStation and PlayStation 2 consoles. It is the successor to World Destruction League: Thunder Tanks, released the year before.

== Gameplay ==
The game takes place in a fixed third-person perspective as the player pilots a variety of futuristic aircraft in order to do battle with enemies on the ground and in the air while collecting power-ups and in-game currency known as "bux". Players can take two different jets into battle and switch between them using a collectable power-up. In all, there are nine different airplanes, thirty-three arenas, and five game modes. Most of the game modes fall into common categories such as search and destroy along with capture the flag.

== Reception ==
Reception

Aggregate scores
Aggregator	Score	
Aggregator	PS	PS2
GameRankings	40%	57%
Metacritic	N/A	59/100

Review scores
Publication	Score	
Publication	PS	PS2
AllGame	2/5	2.5/5
Game Informer	N/A	5.5/10
GameRevolution	N/A	D+
GamesMaster	N/A	34%
GameSpot	4.6/10	6.6/10
IGN	N/A	5.5/10
Jeuxvideo.com	8/20	9/20
Next Generation	N/A	3/5
PlayStation Official Magazine – UK	N/A	2/10
Official U.S. PlayStation Magazine	2/5	2.5/5

The PlayStation 2 version received "mixed" reviews according to the review aggregation website Metacritic. Frank Provo, writing for GameSpot, said of the same console version that the developers deserved credit for "creating a dog-fighting system that is simultaneously intuitive and diverse". He went on to criticize the graphics, specifically, "muddy textures, 2D explosions, blocky structures, disappearing polygons, and frequent slowdown". David Smith of IGN shared similar sentiment with regards to the graphics of the same console version, noting the dull palette of greens, browns, and grays and the muddy textures. He went on to praise the simple controls and entertaining voice acting, but denounced the gameplay as dull and easy. He concluded that "Four-player support should have been included." Rob Smolka of NextGen said of the same console version, "There's a lot to see and do, but the bell-shaped fun curve peaks too soon, and you'll likely lose interest before the end."
