= Cyclone Studios =

American video game developer

- Type: Subsidiary
- Industry: Video games
- Founded: 1993
- Headquarters: San Mateo, California
- Key people: Helmut Kobler; Ron Little
- Parent: The 3DO Company

Cyclone Studios was an American video game developer and publisher based in San Mateo, California. It developed several titles for the 3DO Interactive Multiplayer and later Microsoft Windows.

== Early works ==
Cyclone Studios was founded in December 1993 by Helmut Kobler and Ron Little. Kobler recounted, "Ron left college about a year after I did, and we started discussing what it would be like to design a game, then just talked ourselves into believing it was possible." After securing a contract with 3DO to develop Captain Quazar, a cartoony isometric Shooter for 3DO's home console, they moved from Little's apartment to Redwood City, California in June 1994. At the time they started another 3DO title called BattleSport, a first-person 3D game. In spring of 1995 Cyclone moved to Menlo Park, California. Both BattleSport and Captain Quazar were released after Cyclone's acquisition by The 3DO Company; BattleSport was released in late 1995 and Captain Quazar in early 1996.

== Cyclone as a division of the 3DO Company ==
The company was acquired by The 3DO Company in December 1995 and moved to San Mateo, California. Kobler was assigned as the leader of the division and Little was chosen to be the tech leader. Cyclone began developing games as a division of The 3DO Company for the PC and Panasonic M2.

=== Uprising ===
Uprising is a hybrid first person action strategy game. It was shipped in October 1997 and met solid critical response, but sold below expectations due primarily to the marketing challenge of clearly communicating the unique and compelling aspects the blending of the two genres. Many consumers were unsure of what the game was and pre-launch hype proved difficult to build. Two sequels were developed thanks to the game's critical success: Uprising 2: Lead and Destroy was released for PC and Uprising-X was released on the PlayStation. After the release of Uprising-X the members of Cyclone Studios were absorbed into The 3DO Company.

The editors of Computer Games Strategy Plus named Uprising: Join or Die the best action game of 1997.

The sequel, Lead and Destroy, was published in December 1998 for Windows.

=== Requiem ===
Requiem: Avenging Angel is a story-driven first-person shooter. It was released in April 1999 and met modest critical acclaim and poor sales.

== Games ==
| Game title | Release date | Genre | Platform |
|---|---|---|---|
| BattleSport | 1995 | Sports | 3DO |
| Captain Quazar | 1996 | Isometric 3D Shooter | 3DO, Microsoft Windows |
| Uprising: Join or Die | September 30, 1997 | Action, strategy | Microsoft Windows |
| Uprising X | November 30, 1998 | Action, strategy | PlayStation |
| Uprising 2: Lead and Destroy | December 31, 1998 | Action, strategy | Microsoft Windows |
| Requiem: Avenging Angel | March 31, 1999 | First-person shooter | Microsoft Windows |
| BattleSport II | Cancelled | Sports | Nintendo 64 |
| Wrath of the Fallen | Cancelled | Action | Microsoft Windows |
