= Uprising 2: Lead and Destroy =

1998 video game

Uprising 2: Lead And Destroy
- Developer: Cyclone Studios
- Publisher: The 3DO Company
- Series: Uprising
- Platform: Microsoft Windows
- Release: NA: December 9, 1998; EU: 1999
- Genre: Real-time strategy
- Modes: single-player, multiplayer

Uprising 2: Lead and Destroy is an action/real-time strategy video game developed by Cyclone Studios and published by 3DO on December 9, 1998 for Microsoft Windows. The game is a direct sequel to Uprising which was developed and published by the same companies.

== Gameplay ==
The game allows the player to again take control of the Wraith command tank, and enter the fight with a ruthless horde of enemies called the Kri'iSara, who also appeared in the PlayStation port of the first game. Upon release, critics lauded the game for its graphical presentation and unique style of gameplay, but were displeased with its lack of difficulty and predictable mission structure. The game offers 36 missions to complete, with 28 of these missions broken up into three mini-campaigns, which the player can complete in any order they desire. Gameplay involves searching through the battlefield to find citadel locations as well as assembling bases so the playter can harvest energy and build military units. When faced with an enemy combatant, the player can use their Wraith and call on support from military units the player has created.

== Reception ==
Reception

Aggregate score
Aggregator	Score
GameRankings	67%

Review scores
Publication	Score
AllGame	3.5/5
CNET Gamecenter	7/10
Computer Gaming World	3.5/5
GamePro	3.5/5
GameSpot	7.7/10
GameStar	82%
Next Generation	4/5
PC Accelerator	7/10
PC Gamer (US)	79%
PC Games (DE)	72%
PC Zone	70%

The game received average reviews according to the review aggregation website GameRankings.

The Adrenaline Vault said that while it could have been a great game, Uprising ended up being merely good.

Many game critics complained that game was too easy and that the mission designs were contrived and predictable giving the sense that one has been there before. Despite the negativity, critics and gamers alike were generally pleased with the game overall. Next Generation said that the game "packs enough fast action, deep strategy, and overall intensity to please any gamer, and that's what really counts."
