= Tokyo Wars =

1996 video game

- Developer: Namco
- Publisher: Namco
- Composer: Akihiko Ishikawa
- Platform: Arcade
- Release: JP: September 1996; NA: October 1996
- Genre: Vehicular combat
- Modes: Single-player, multiplayer
- Arcade system: Namco Super System 22

Tokyo Wars (Note: Japanese: トーキョーウォーズ, Hepburn: Tokyo Wōzu) is a 1996 vehicular combat video game developed and published by Namco for arcades. Hamster Corporation released the game as part of their Arcade Archives series for the Nintendo Switch and PlayStation 4, as well as their Arcade Archives 2 series for the Nintendo Switch 2, PlayStation 5 and Xbox Series X/S in November 2025.

== Gameplay ==
The player engaging in combat with an enemy tank.

Tokyo Wars allows one to eight players to control separate tanks, either as teammates or as opponents. Players can play either in the heart of downtown Tokyo or at the city's bayside dock. However, the players have twenty seconds to make all the decisions before the game automatically locks them in.

The deluxe cabinets features a pneumatic haptic control that simulates the recoil effect from the tank's main gun. Since the regular cabinets do not offer an air-powered recoil, the deluxe edition delivers slightly more realism than the normal cabinet. Arrows on top the screen help determine teammate from opponent because twenty tanks are rushing down the battlefield looking for an easy kill. While cars can always be demolished by crushing them over, some of the passageways in the game would crumble under the weight of the massive tanks.

A game lasts for fifteen minutes or until all opposing tanks are shot down. The game uses Namco's Super System 22 board, with a custom cabinet. Players must sit down in order to play the game. Games can be played either as a competition with human players on both sides or cooperatively on the same team against AI-controlled opponents. Although only two players can play at a time, up to four machines can be interconnected to provide up to eight players a chance to compete in tournament-style matches.

== Reception ==
Reception

Review scores
Publication	Score
Next Generation	4/5
Player One	86%

Tokyo Wars was a popular title in arcades during the late-1990s; the Japanese arcade game publication Game Machine reported that it was the most popular arcade game of January 1997. A reviewer for Next Generation said the game "is essentially a mondo, testosterone cannonfest with semi-fast tanks (faster than real tanks, but not as fast as you want them to be)", praising the large arenas with strategically useful cover and destructible scenery. He noted that the game was geared heavily towards two-on-two play, to the point where the cabinet is only sold in a four-player configuration, though single-player play is possible.

In 2010, Ron Alpert of Gamasutra believed that Tokyo Wars was one of Namco's most-impressive arcade games at the time, writing that it "dragged the genre kicking and screaming into the new generation with a much more arresting presentation." He compared its gameplay to Atari's Battlezone and shared his admiration for its arcade cabinet. Kotaku Australia writer Chris Jager ranked it among the best tank-themed video games of all time in 2014, believing that it and similar games gave arcades an edge over platforms such as the Nintendo 64. Jager found the graphics to still be impressive today, and also enjoyed its control style and force feedback.

== Legacy ==
In 2009, Namco Bandai Games produced a spiritual successor to Tokyo Wars, titled Tank! Tank! Tank!. Originally released for arcades, it was later ported to the Wii U in 2012 as a system launch title. Tank! Tank! Tank! features many of the same mechanics and concepts established in Tokyo Wars, focusing primarily on the co-operative play and destroying larger boss enemies. While the arcade version was liked for its gameplay and exhilarating action, the Wii U version was harshly criticized for its lack of online play and depth. Tokyo Wars was also a heavy source of inspiration for the Nintendo 64 game BattleTanx.
