= Tank! Tank! Tank! =

2009 video game

- Sales flyer
- Developer: Namco Bandai Games
- Publisher: Namco Bandai Games (Note: Released under the Namco brand name.)
- Producer: Makoto Ishii
- Composer: Hiroki Hashimoto
- Platforms: Arcade, Wii U
- Release: Arcade: JP: October 9, 2009; NA/PAL: 2009; Wii U: NA: November 18, 2012; PAL: November 30, 2012; JP: December 26, 2012
- Genre: Third-person shooter
- Modes: Single-player, multiplayer

Tank! Tank! Tank! (Note: Japanese: タンク!タンク!タンク!, Hepburn: Tanku! Tanku! Tanku!) is a 2009 third-person shooter arcade game developed and published by Namco Bandai Games. It was ported to the Wii U in 2012, where it was a system launch title in North America. Players control their respective tanks and must destroy opponents and mechanical kaiju with a variety of weapons, such as machine guns and rocket launchers. Its gameplay has been compared to titles such as the Earth Defense Force series, through its usage of B-movie tropes and parodying.

Designed by producer Makoto Ishii, Tank! Tank! Tank! is a spiritual successor to Tokyo Wars (1996), an older Namco arcade game that shared many of the same mechanics and ideas. Ishii wanted to create an arcade game that allowed players to express themselves through its fast-paced gameplay and visuals. He designed it around a vertical-oriented monitor, a concept borrowed from the popularity of Japanese mobile games. As these were often played with a vertical screen, Ishii believed it would automatically make players familiar with the gameplay of Tank! Tank! Tank!. The game underwent a reportedly troubled development cycle.

The arcade version of Tank! Tank! Tank! was well-received, with critics applauding its exhilarating gameplay and wide array of weapons. By comparison, the Wii U version received largely negative reviews, being criticized for its lackluster gamemodes, shallow content, and difficult controls. Several believed that the Wii U port was evident that the game should have been exclusive to arcades. However, it was praised for its concept and graphical style, and was a moderate commercial success in Japan.

== Gameplay ==
The player fighting a swarm of enemy bees in the Wii U version.

The player controls a tank and shoots monsters with ammunition. A player's photo is taken with a nearby camera (dubbed the NamCam) and is used as an avatar to identify each player's tank. Each level contains destructible elements and weapons range from a plasma bolt to a machine gun. Accessories can be added to the avatars, such as military helmets and wrestling masks. Collateral damage against the city background is encouraged in addition to dealing damage to the monsters that inhabit the game. Players can either divide themselves into two rival teams, team up to fight the monsters in a cooperative manner, or fight against each other.

== Development and release ==
Tank! Tank! Tank! was produced by Makoto Ishii, an employee of Namco Bandai Games. Ishii wanted to create an arcade game that allowed players to express themselves through its fast-paced gameplay and visuals. He designed the game around a vertical-oriented monitor, a concept he borrowed from cell phones. As mobile users were familiar with playing games with a vertical screen, Ishii believed that a vertical monitor would automatically make its players familiar with how the game is played. Ishii also felt that the vertical screen tapped into his goal of allowing players to "express" themselves, with its enemies and level geometry being designed to provide a sense of "overwhelming power" for its players. Publications believe that the Earth Defense Force series, published by Namco Bandai subsidiary D3 Publisher, also served as inspiration for the game. The soundtrack was composed by Hiroki Hashimoto, who went on to compose the music for Pac-Man & Galaga Dimensions (2011) and several tracks for Super Smash Bros. for 3DS (2014). Tank! Tank! Tank! is a spiritual successor to Tokyo Wars (1996), an older Namco arcade game that also involved tanks shooting enemies. It was programmed for the Namco System ES1, a Linux-powered arcade system board. According to Radio Nikkei, the game underwent a troubled development cycle.

Namco Bandai Games demonstrated Tank! Tank! Tank! at the 2009 Japan Amusement Machine Show exposition in Tokyo, presented alongside the lightgun shooter Deadstorm Pirates. It was released in Japan in October 2009, and in North America and Europe later that year; all three releases were published under the original Namco label. In September 2012, a port of Tank! Tank! Tank! was announced for the Wii U as a launch title for the system in North America, which was released on November 18, 2012. It was later released in Europe on November 30 and in Japan on December 26. The Japanese version was originally released as a downloadable free-to-play game on the Nintendo eShop, where the player was able to play through the single-player campaign for free and could buy the other game modes as downloadable content. A physical retail version was later released on February 21, 2013. In Europe and North America, the game became free-to-play on February 14, 2013 and May 2, 2013 respectively.

== Reception ==
Reception

Aggregate score
Aggregator	Score
Metacritic	45/100

Review scores
Publication	Score
Destructoid	4.5/10
Eurogamer	5/10
Famitsu	28/40
Game Informer	4.5/10
GameSpot	4/10
GamesRadar+	2.5/5
GameTrailers	3.6/10
Hardcore Gamer	3/5
IGN	5.8/10
Joystiq	2.5/5
Nintendo Life	5/10
Nintendo Power	3.5/10
Nintendo World Report	4/10
Polygon	3.5/10
The Escapist	2/5
Metro	3/10

The arcade version of Tank! Tank! Tank! was well-received. 1Up.com writer Justin Epperson enjoyed its general absurdity and its gameplay for being fun and full of frantic, fast-paced action. Staff from Radio Nikkei showed their enthusiasm towards the game's selection of powerful weapons and exhilarating action, writing that it would definitely keep players coming back for more. Game Watch's Toyotomi Kazutaka was particularly fond of the arcade cabinet and its vibrating seats, and liked the gameplay for its exhilarating feel and arsenal of weapons.

The Wii U version sold 40,243 units in Japan, and is one of the top 50 best-selling games for the platform in the country. However, it received "generally unfavorable reviews" according to the review aggregation website Metacritic. Critics focused primarily on the game's limited amount of gamemodes and content. GameSpot's Britton Peele described it as being "hours of boredom spent playing a game that was never intended to be stretched out for so long." Both Casey Lynch of IGN and Kevin Knezevic of GamesRadar+ disliked the repetition of missions found in the story mode, with Knezevic claiming that the co-operative play only barely alleviated this. Patrick Barnett of Nintendo World Report disliked the story campaign in general for its lack of replay value and variety, as did Peele. The controls were also a source of criticism; Barnett felt they made the game unnecessarily difficult because of the way they were designed. Most publications agreed that Tank! Tank! Tank! was a shallow port of an arcade game that was simply too low on content to justify a console release.
