= Dragon Rage =

2001 video game

- North American cover art
- Developer(s): The 3DO Company
- Publisher(s): The 3DO Company
- Platform(s): PlayStation 2
- Release: NA: November 27, 2001; EU: March 15, 2002
- Genre(s): Shooter
- Mode(s): Single-player

Dragon Rage is a PlayStation 2 game by The 3DO Company. The player controls an escaped dragon named Cael Cyndar on a mission to save the dragon race from extermination by the orcs. Cael's guide is Adara the Sprite. The dragon's attacks include ramming, biting, grabbing & dropping, and breathing fire. Whenever Cael eats orcs, he gains Mana points. Eating farm animals replenishes Health. When Cael releases captured sprites, they give information or teach Cael about his magical powers. Orc forces include ground units (orc warriors), naval units (ships), air units (hot air balloons), castle defenses (towers), and war machines (catapults). There are many animations and cut scenes. The game was originally intended to be a Might and Magic title. The title originally going to be Dragon Wars of Might and Magic. However, as the story did not truly coincide with the Might and Magic universe the title was dropped.

== Gameplay ==
Dragon Rage is a dragon shooter game, where Cael flies around breathing fire, ice and lightning, and dropping giant rock boulders. If Cael eats 5 cows, he can earn a fury attack. The first level trains Cael and the player to use dragon powers. Other levels include rescuing dragon eggs and sprites, destroying fortresses, passing through magical gates, and stopping orcs. The controls are simple and include barrel rolls, picking up rocks, and activating other dragon powers.

== Reception ==
Reception

Aggregate score
Aggregator	Score
Metacritic	50/100

Review scores
Publication	Score
GameSpot	4.1/10
GameSpy	55/100
GameZone	6.4/10
IGN	6.2/10

Dragon Rage received mixed to negative reviews from critics. On Metacritic, the game received a score of 50/100 based on 9 reviews, indicating "mixed or average reviews".
