= Sammy Sosa Softball Slam =

2000 baseball video game

- Developer: The 3DO Company
- Publisher: The 3DO Company
- Platforms: Windows, PlayStation
- Release: NA: February 29, 2000
- Genre: Sports
- Modes: Single-player, multiplayer

Sammy Sosa Softball Slam is a baseball video game developed and published by The 3DO Company in 2000. It is one of the games to feature then-Chicago Cubs right fielder Sammy Sosa on the cover, the other being Sammy Sosa High Heat Baseball 2001.

== Gameplay ==
The player selects from male, female, and coed teams—each rated on power, accuracy, speed, fielding, throwing, and pitching—and can bat, field, pitch, and run the bases using a simple four-button control scheme or let the computer handle the actions. Available play modes include Family, Single, and Tournament, allowing the player to pick a team, stadium, and time of day, set the batting order, make substitutions, and compete against computer teams across various matchups.

== Reception ==
Reception

Aggregate score
Aggregator	Score	
Aggregator	PC	PS
GameRankings	50%	42%

Review scores
Publication	Score	
Publication	PC	PS
CNET Gamecenter	6/10	N/A
Computer Games Strategy Plus	1.5/5	N/A
Computer Gaming World	2.5/5	N/A
Electronic Gaming Monthly	N/A	1.83/10
Game Informer	N/A	5.75/10
GameFan	N/A	72%
GameSpot	N/A	3.3/10
GameZone	7.5/10	N/A
IGN	4.6/10	3/10
Official U.S. PlayStation Magazine	N/A	2/5

The PC version received mixed reviews, while the PlayStation version received unfavorable reviews, according to the review aggregation website GameRankings.
