= Uprising: Join or Die =

1997 action real-time strategy game

- North American cover art
- Developer: Cyclone Studios
- Publisher: The 3DO Company
- Director: Helmut Kobler
- Producer: Don McClure
- Designers: Daryl Allison, Justin Bates, David Dodge
- Programmers: Doug Banks, Jon Cortelyou, Patrick MacKellar
- Artists: Michael Janov, Michael A. Khoury, Maarten Kraaijvanger
- Series: Uprising
- Platform: Microsoft Windows
- Release: October 14, 1997: NA: October 14, 1997; DE: 1997; JP: July 24, 1998 GOG March 17, 2016 Steam May 19, 2016
- Genres: Action, real-time strategy

Uprising: Join or Die is an action real-time strategy video game by American developer Cyclone Studios, released in North America on October 14, 1997 and in Japan on July 24, 1998 for Windows. The player controls a powerful combat vehicle known as the Wraith that transports rebel units onto the battlefield, fighting against the military. For the first few months of its development, it had no script written for it and as the release date neared, gameplay videos were created to demonstrate its support for the 3dfx graphics card. It received a port to the PlayStation as Uprising X, which was released in December 1998; and before that, a sequel, Uprising 2: Lead and Destroy, was released for the PC on December 9, 1998.

Upon release, it garnered generally favorable reviews. It was praised for its graphical presentation and gameplay as well as its online multiplayer support, but drew some criticism for its overly difficult computer-controlled enemies and control schemes. It was awarded the title of 1997's best action game by Computer Games Strategy Plus. The game received a GOG.com and Steam rerelease in March and May 2016 respectively.

== Gameplay ==
Locking onto an enemy - this shows the first-person perspective of the game.

Missions in Uprising's single-player campaign are structured around building and fortifying bases in order to amass enough offensive capability to attack, defeat, and claim enemy bases. Bases must be built upon predetermined points on the map. By positioning the Wraith over a claim square, players can call down a Citadel, which allows for additional structures to be built at that location. The number of structures that can be built at any one control point can vary, and the resources that can be drawn from them are likewise finite. In order to augment resource generation and building capacity past what is currently available to them, players must scout and claim additional base locations, often by force. A scenario will typically end once all base locations are under player control, though occasionally missions will have other objectives as well. After each mission, the player is granted currency with which to upgrade units, structures, and their Wraith.

At the beginning of the single-player campaign, the player has two weapons (a Gatling laser and heat seeking missiles), though these can be upgraded to weapons such as heat seeking missiles, landmines and mortar bombs - these weapons, along with the Wraith's armor, are upgradeable. All structures are available to the player at the start of the game and like the weapons and the Wraith's armor, can be upgraded to varying levels.

== Plot ==
When the ability to travel through space was discovered, the people of Earth were split along ideological lines. Though some predicted that man's newfound ability to explore the stars will bring the world's population together for the greater good, for the most part the various factions and ideologies of Earth began to claim and settle worlds for their own purposes rather than cooperate as a cohesive group. One fateful day, however, the entire human population of the planet Albion was wiped out by an unknown force, and humanity joined forces to create a vast military government organization to seek out and defeat this mysterious aggressor. They encountered a belligerent race known as the Swarm, and reports sent from the front lines painted a picture of a successful war effort against alien aggressors.

But third-party reports - all vehemently denied by the military - told of usable alien technology being recovered from Albion, and along with the entire planet being placed under quarantine (allegedly due to radioactivity), these reports caused many to begin questioning the authenticity of the military's version of events. Some wondered if the war was truly still being fought, while others wondered if it ever was. Many who spoke loudly against the military's behavior disappeared. Eventually, the military (who would come to be known as the Imperium) granted its general Caston the title of Emperor and despite a huge public backlash, was able to quickly put down anyone who openly rebelled against them.

The player character of Uprising is a young man from the planet Caliban who successfully managed to avoid conscription by the Imperium through a combination of intellect and combat prowess. His actions eventually brought him to the attention of an anti-Imperium rebel group, who, recognizing his potential, decided to give him further training. It was precisely because of this training and instinctive competence that the player character was chosen to pilot the Wraith, a highly advanced Imperium weapon and command vehicle appropriated by the rebels. With only one Wraith known to exist, the rebels plan to use it as a spearhead in their fight against Imperium, believing that they have a technological advantage over their opponents for the first time.

== Development ==
For the first six months of development, no script was written - according to Cyclone Studios' president and the game's director, Helmut Kobler:

"...all we had was a 10 page memo describing some simple tenants [sic] and images we thought the game should have - for instance, seeing hordes of troops laying siege to an enemy fortification but getting cut to pieces by [a] rapid fire ground cannon; or seeing a low-altitude bomber drop its payload as it's shot down by enemy SAM sites or watching a squad of futuristic gunships dog-fighting overhead."

Late into development, several more features were implemented - mainly to lower the learning curve of the game - which included training missions, tips and voice cues, among other improvements. A contentious subject among the developers was whether to make the game's use of arrow keys consistent across its first person view and its map; however, according to the producer Don McClure, he and Kobler decided to keep the controls inconsistent, as it made the map "more intuitive" for first time players.

As development was finalised, support for the 3dfx chip was also implemented, and according to McClure, the development team was "stunned" by the results - so much that they delayed the release until October to create gameplay videos for the game, and made them available on Uprising's main site.

== Reception ==
Reception

Review scores
Publication	Score
AllGame	4/5
CNET Gamecenter	8/10
Computer Games Strategy Plus	4/5
Computer Gaming World	4/5
Edge	8/10
Game Informer	6.75/10
GameRevolution	B
GameSpot	7.1/10
Next Generation	5/5
PC Gamer (UK)	70%
PC Gamer (US)	90%
PC PowerPlay	89%

Award
Publication	Award
Computer Games Strategy Plus	Best Action Game of 1997

The game received average to positive reviews. PC Gamer UK opined that the gameplay mimicked "fighting off the Forkish invaders with guile, cunning, and the assistance of a platoon of well-armed sprouts", with PC Gamer US complimenting the gameplay as well. The first person perspective was also well-received, with GameSpot giving praise for the "cinematic feel of the battles", and PC Gamer UK commending the game for "giving [the player] both a tank’s-eye view of the unfolding action and overall control of the battle". Next Generation lauded that the game "is groundbreaking gaming at its best: fast, challenging, and beautiful. It's absolutely way beyond recommended." However, one problematic aspect of the gameplay among some reviewers was the AI's difficulty - GameRevolution's reviewer noted that after the "first 3 or so missions" of the campaign, the game got "REALLY hard" to the point that they "stopped playing it"; GameSpot saw the campaign get "increasingly more difficult" to the point that it was almost impossible to play; and PC Gamer UK advised that without a clear strategy, the player would "soon be sent packing no matter how skilled [they] are at controlling [the Wraith]".

The mix of action and strategy elements in Uprising generally garnered praise - GameRevolution wrote that the game offered an "interesting twist and mix" on the genre; PC Gamer US stated that Uprising managed to combine "two crowded genres" and to be "a very refreshing break from both"; the game was praised by Edge for "drawing [strategy and combat] together" and as a result, making it a "satisfying whole"; and according to GameSpot, it was set to carve out a niche in the real time strategy market. However, one of the lone critics of the action-strategy mix was PC Gamer UK, with their criticism being that Uprising was "trying to please all of the people all of the time by making [the player] do everything at once" and instead wound up only satisfying "some of the people for some of the time".

The game's graphics were generally commended by critics - GameSpot considered the graphics to be "excellent", they were described by GameRevolution as "clean and smooth", and they were also complimented by PC Gamer US - however, one side effect they named was that it required at least a 200Mhz Pentium CPU with a 3D accelerator to run the game smoothly; even then, it would "crash and burn" unless they had the latest graphics drivers installed. Next Generation said the graphics boast "z-buffered explosions and fire, nary a polygon out of place, and some cool lighting effects. It supports 3Dfx's Glide API directly, and those with 3Dfx-based accelerators can expect a high-resolution, high-frame-rate experience that has to be seen firsthand." Edge opined that the game's soundtrack was "as convincing as any Hollywood sci-fi music".

The staff of Computer Games Strategy Plus named it the best action game of 1997.

== Sequels ==
A sequel, Uprising 2: Lead and Destroy, was released on December 9, 1998, followed by a port of the first game, Uprising X, released for the PlayStation in North America on December 15, 1998.

The game received a re-release for GOG.com on March 17, 2016 and for Steam on May 19.
