= Captain Quazar =

1996 video game

- Developers: Cyclone Studios, 3DO
- Publisher: 3DO
- Producer: Rich Shane
- Platforms: 3DO Interactive Multiplayer, Microsoft Windows
- Release: 3DO Interactive Multiplayer February 1996; Microsoft Windows; 1997
- Genre: Third-person shooter
- Modes: Single-player, multiplayer

Captain Quazar is a science fiction third-person action game by developer Cyclone Studios, first published in 1996 by 3DO. Though initially released as an exclusive for 3DO's Interactive Multiplayer console, after the system was discontinued, Captain Quazar was ported to the Windows 95 PC platform in 1997 (a route followed by many other 3DO titles).

The game is a tongue-in-cheek science fiction adventure. The player controls the title character—a not-too-bright, futuristic, Rambo-style law enforcement officer—as he crosses the galaxy on missions for his irate police chief.

== Gameplay ==
The player controls Captain Quazar from a third-person, isometric view. The player is able to utilize a variety of futuristic and fantastical guns, missiles, and bombs. Different weapons can be picked up or bought at the beginning, and at certain places within each level. Enemies can also occasionally be interrogated for information, which can open up secret levels and items. The game only allows the player to save at the beginning of each level.

This game will not run on modern operating systems, post Windows 95, unless compatibility mode is toggled for post Windows 95 operating systems.

== Development ==
Captain Quazar was Cyclone Studios' first project. For six months, founders Helmut Kobler and Ron Little worked on a basic prototype for the game, Kobler creating the game design in his apartment in Palo Alto, California while Little coded the game in his apartment in East Oakland. They then took the prototype, character designs, and scripts to 3DO, who decided to fund the game.

== Reception ==
Reception

Review scores
Publication	Score
AllGame	3.5/5 (3DO)
Electronic Gaming Monthly	8.125/10 (3DO)
Next Generation	2/5 (3DO)
Power Unlimited	85%

Upon release of the 3DO version, the four reviewers of Electronic Gaming Monthly applauded the high level of action, cartoonish and humorous graphics, compelling cinemas, and the enormous levels. However, they complained of difficulty with the aiming. A reviewer for Next Generation agreed that the aiming does not work well due to a combination of tricky controls and the unusual perspective, and found that the humor falls flat. He additionally criticized that while the level design is often ingenious, the difficulty is much too high, and concluded the game is "not offensive, or even in the groan category, just dull, like some cousin at the family reunion who's the only one laughing at all his jokes." GamePro's review came several months late, with the explanation that the magazine had never received a review copy of the game, but was much more enthusiastic than EGM and Next Generation. Reviewer Scary Larry called it "one of the best action games on the 3DO", commenting positively on the humor, graphics effects, music, sound effects, large amount of content, and fun gameplay, though like the other critics he acknowledged that the aiming is tough to get a handle on. Power Unlimited gave a score of 85% summarizing: "Cheesy platform/shooting game with top graphics, top sound and a two-player option. The levels are very large and the action is especially fun with two players."

Electronic Gaming Monthly editors named Captain Quazar their 3DO Game of the Year. While they noted that far fewer 3DO games had come out in 1996 than in previous years, they felt that with its fast-paced action and high replay value, Captain Quazar genuinely merited an award (whereas other systems which had been discontinued during the year, such as the Atari Jaguar, 32X, and CD-i, were not allotted their own category in EGM's "Best of '96" awards).
