= Club 3DO: Station Invasion =

1994 video game

- Developer: Studio 3DO
- Publisher: Studio 3DO
- Director: Ed Rotberg
- Platform: 3DO Interactive Multiplayer
- Release: December 6, 1994
- Genre: Educational
- Modes: Single-player, multiplayer

Club 3DO: Station Invasion is an educational video game for the 3DO Interactive Multiplayer.

== Concept ==
A bunch of kids have bought out a local TV station and replaced all the adults, resulting in the creation of KID-TV. The station now plays six different shows, each of which is hosted by one of the six playable characters. Billy is the star of sitcom "I'm Grounded", Angelica heads the soap opera "Sundaes of Our Lives", Bryce is the host of "Mysteries Shmysteries", 'Sopha Sinfree' runs a talk show named after herself, and Ernie is the host behind "What's That Smell?". Not among the playable cast are newshost Mary Carp and her cohost, John.

== Gameplay ==
Club 3DO: Station Invasion is a game in which kids solve puzzles to gain rating points.

== Development ==
Development of Club 3DO: Station Invasion was led by Ed Rotberg, previously a key figure on the classic Atari arcade shooter Battlezone. Station Invasion was conceived as an "edutainment" title at the behest of The 3DO Company head Trip Hawkins. As an educational game, Rotberg felt it was "not as big a success as we would have liked," blaming its insufficient content on time and budget restrictions. Rotberg lamented, "If we had DVD back then, it could have been a whole lot better. And it was done in 8 and a half months. Which is the amazing thing considering all the video and the content it did have in it. The team I had doing that were total champions."

== Reception ==
Reception

Review scores
Publication	Score
Game Players	75%
Next Generation	3/5
3DO Magazine	3/5
Electronic Games	D+
VideoGames	6/10

Next Generation reviewed the game, rating it three stars out of five, and stated that "If you're under eight, it's a scream."
