= Requiem: Avenging Angel =

1999 video game

- North American cover art
- Developer: Cyclone Studios
- Publisher: The 3DO Company
- Producer: Jennifer Hubbart
- Designer: Phillip Co
- Programmer: Kerry Moffitt
- Composer: Doug Adams
- Platform: Microsoft Windows
- Release: NA: March 31, 1999; EU: May 15, 1999
- Genre: First-person shooter
- Modes: Single-player, multiplayer

Requiem: Avenging Angel, also known as simply Requiem, is a first-person shooter video game developed by Cyclone Studios and published by 3DO in 1999. It was re-released on GOG.com on April 14, 2016, and on Steam on July 7, 2016.

== Gameplay ==
The game begins in the realm of Chaos, a limbo world between Heaven and Earth. Without the use of conventional weapons, the player must use the playable character's angelic powers for defense. These angelic powers work similarly to the Force powers of Star Wars Jedi Knight: Dark Forces II. The game has a bullet time feature, slowing down time to allow the player to dodge bullets and kill multiple enemies. It was the first videogame ever to feature such a mechanic.

The weaponry features many "stock" weapons found in other games, such as the pistol, the rocket launcher, and the railgun. One of the player's powers is to possess enemies. This allows access to various other weapons which cannot be used via the player character.

Like Half-Life, Requiem has no distinct levels, and instead places the player within a seamless interlinked world. The majority of the game is set in mid-21st century Earth, and thus many of the locations are stylised versions of everyday locales, including a bar, a hospital, and a power plant.

== Plot ==
Requiem draws heavily upon the Bible and Christianity for its influences, as well as the more usual sci-fi sources found in other games. The background story is set in Heaven. Looking down upon the Earth, upon his creation, the Lord was not entirely satisfied. The angels could see this, as they could see how his creation was ravaged with greed, corruption and stupidity. And although most angels decided to wait for God's guidance and wisdom, some did not, and took it upon themselves to descend onto Earth and interpret God's presumed desires. These rebellious angels became known as The Fallen.

In the mid 21st century, The Fallen, led by Lilith, have already taken control over humanity's leaders - suppressing the populace with a totalitarian regime, and pushing humanity towards the completion of the Leviathan, humanity's first interstellar craft. With this craft, humanity will be able to reach for the stars, and touch Heaven itself, something which God cannot allow. If The Fallen succeed in creating the Leviathan, God must instigate Armageddon himself, fulfilling the Fallen's desires. The game places the player into the role of Malachi, an angel and servant of God. The player's task is to stop the machinations of the Fallen, to stop the creation of the Leviathan and to avert the apocalypse. To do so the player must leave the realm of Heaven, and travel through the realm of Chaos, and onto Earth itself.

The game contains many references to the Bible. The player character is named after Malachi, an Old Testament prophet. Malachi can also mean "my messenger" or "my angel" in Hebrew. Lilith, the leader of the Fallen, is featured in medieval literature. Other minor characters in the game are also named after Biblical characters, sporting names such as Jonah and Elijah. All the powers possessed by Malachi are explained within the game manual with a Biblical quote. For example, one of Malachi's attacking powers turns an enemy into a statue of salt. This power is explained via the following quote: "But Lot's wife looked back from behind him and she became a pillar of salt. - Genesis 19:26." Certain locations have followed this theme too, with humanity's starship named Leviathan after a sea monster from the Old Testament.

== Development ==
The game's concept and premise were heavily inspired by John Milton's poem Paradise Lost. In contrast to the interconnected world seen in the final game, early in development the plan was for the game to be broken up into three self-contained episodes, each set in a different time period.

To reduce memory requirements for the animations, Cyclone employed a "rigid body animation system" in which the majority of character polygons are skeletal and rigid, with only the joints being able to warp and stretch.

== Reception ==
Reception

Aggregate score
Aggregator	Score
GameRankings	71%

Review scores
Publication	Score
AllGame	4/5
CNET Gamecenter	8/10
Computer Games Strategy Plus	4/5
Computer Gaming World	3.5/5
Edge	6/10
Game Informer	8.75/10
GameFan	80%
GamePro	4/5
GameRevolution	B
GameSpot	7.3/10
IGN	6.7/10
Next Generation	3/5
PC Accelerator	7/10
PC Gamer (US)	72%

The game received above-average reviews according to the review aggregation website GameRankings. Some of the highest praise for the game came from PC Zone, in a review by Charlie Brooker. Brooker praised the game's variety of well-designed character models, and its advanced animation system, stating that the game had "impressive character models that move in all kinds of unpleasantly believable ways."

IGN claimed that the level design was boring and uninspired, and although the game had a competent single player experience, multiplayer was lacking. GameSpot commended the game's innovative angelic powers available for use, comparing them favourably with the force powers in Jedi Knight. However, it stated that although the game had several attractive features, in the end, it was just a typical shoot 'em up with no groundbreaking elements. Next Generation, however, said that the game was "no technical marvel, but its uniqueness is divine."

Requiem was a runner-up in Level's "First Person Shooter" category in the magazine's 1999 awards, which was ultimately won by Aliens Versus Predator.

All the publications agreed that Requiem was not as good as the universally acclaimed Half-Life, released six months prior. The game also lacked pre-release hype, especially in comparison to its contemporary, Xatrix Entertainment's Kingpin: Life of Crime. Released not long after Requiem, Kingpin had generated a lot of hype within the gaming world, and had also amassed some media controversy over its graphic depiction of violence and swearing. The lukewarm reception, coupled with the lack of pre-release hype in comparison to the competition, meant that Requiem never saw commercial success. It would be the last game that Cyclone Studios would ever release before 3DO's demise.
