= The Four Horsemen of the Apocalypse (video game) =

Cancelled video game

- Developers: 3DO; Four Horsemen Entertainment
- Producer: Stan Winston
- Designer: Michael Mendheim
- Artist: J.P. Harrod
- Platforms: GameCube, PlayStation 2, Xbox, Windows
- Release: Cancelled
- Genre: Survival horror

The Four Horsemen of the Apocalypse was to be a video game centered on the actions of several playable characters that are left on earth after the Rapture. These characters were widely different and ranged from a fallen priest to a young stripper and would each have special weapons and abilities specific to themselves.

In late 2002, The 3DO Company, the game's developer, announced that the game would be released on Microsoft Windows, PlayStation 2, GameCube, and Xbox. It was also announced that 3DO would be partnering with Stan Winston on the game as a producer. Stan Winston has been involved in designing creature effects for such films as Jurassic Park, Terminator 2: Judgment Day, and Aliens. The game was basically scrapped after the company went bankrupt in May 2003. However, some hope was rekindled of a release in 2004 when the game's creator, Michael Mendheim, announced that the IP was "far from dead".

== Cast ==
Actor	Character
Lance Henriksen	Abaddon
Courtenay Taylor	Jesse
Tim Curry	Satan
Traci Lords	Pestilence

== Graphic novel ==
Though the game that Michael Mendheim envisioned has still yet to be made, the story from which a broader franchise is planned has been published in comic book form. The Four Horsemen of the Apocalypse Vol. 1, written by Mendheim and illustrated by Simon Bisley, was published by Titan comics in 2014.
