= Escape from Monster Manor =

1993 video game

- Developer: Studio 3DO
- Publisher: Electronic Arts: JP: Electronic Arts Victor
- Producers: Stewart Bonn; Trip Hawkins
- Programmer: Leo Schwab
- Artist: Stefan Henry-Biskup
- Composer: Robert Vieira
- Platform: 3DO
- Release: NA: 1993; EU: 1994; JP: March 26, 1994
- Genre: First-person shooter
- Mode: Single-player

Escape from Monster Manor is a first-person shooter video game developed by Studio 3DO and published by Electronic Arts exclusively for the 3DO.

The game was released as Virtual Horror: Norowarate Yakata (Note: Japanese: バーチャルホラー 〜呪われた館〜, Hepburn: Bācharu Horā ~Norowareta Yakata~; lit. Virtual Horror: Cursed House) in Japan.

== Gameplay ==
Escape From Monster Manor is a first-person shooter where the player character explores a haunted mansion in a 3D environment, and must defeat spiders, ghosts, and other menaces to escape.

The objective of the game is to collect pieces of a sacred talisman in each stage, then make it through twelve levels to the exit to escape. Rather than having a HUD, the player's health is visible as damage to the on-screen hand and the ammunition is listed as a bar on the gun sprite.

== Development and release ==
The game's main developer was Leo Schwab. A computing and programming prodigy, Schwab was best known for his Amiga screen hacks and animations during the mid-late 1980s and for developing Disney Presents: The Animation Studio for Silent Software in 1990. Schwab joined Electronic Arts head Trip Hawkins when the latter founded The 3DO Company for the release of the 3DO Interactive Multiplayer. For Escape from Monster Manor, Schwab has cited Wolfenstein 3D as the chief inspiration for the game. After some months working on a different 3DO game, Schwab and his team abandoned that project and switched to the less ambitious Escape from Monster Manor so that they could have a demo to present at that year's Consumer Electronics Show. The game's source code was released onto GitHub under the MIT License on August 7, 2022, with an accompanying live stream on YouTube by original developer Leo Schwab.

== Reception ==
Reception

Review scores
Publication	Score
AllGame	2.5/5
Dragon	2/5
Edge	5/10
Electronic Gaming Monthly	7/10, 8/10, 6/10, 6/10
Famitsu	8/10, 7/10, 7/10, 8/10
GameFan	80%, 89%, 90%, 93%
GamePro	18.5/20
3DO Magazine	3/5
Game Zero Magazine	20.5/25, 10/25
Génération 4	68%
Joystick	73%
MAN!AC	73%
Video Games	67%
VideoGames	8/10

Electronic Gaming Monthly gave the game a 6.75 out of 10, mentioning some minor issues with the control but overall recommending the game for its well-rendered graphics and genuinely creepy audio. GamePro praised the game's frightening graphics and audio, nerve-wracking challenge, and strafing ability. A review in Edge praised the "look and feel" of the game, but criticized the simplicity of the game design and gameplay. The game was compared unfavorably to DOOM and given a score of 5/10. The game was reviewed in 1994 in Dragon #204 by Sandy Petersen in the "Eye of the Monitor" column. Petersen gave the game 2 out of 5 stars.
