= Uprising X =

1998 video game

- Game cover
- Developer: Cyclone Studios
- Publisher: The 3DO Company
- Producer: Simon Everett
- Designers: David Dodge, J. Epps, Marcus Montgomery, Eric Simonich, Mary Parker, Helmut Kobler
- Programmers: Larry Lien, Chris MacDonald, Brad McKee, Peter Young
- Artists: Michael Janov, Carlos Hernandez, Chris Donovan, Michael O'Rourke
- Composers: Burke Trieschmann, Tony Mills, Kent Carter, Matt Campagna
- Series: Uprising
- Platform: PlayStation
- Release: NA: December 18, 1998
- Genre: Action/Real-time strategy
- Modes: Single-player, multiplayer

Uprising X is a port of Uprising: Join or Die for the original PlayStation, released December 18, 1998 in the U.S., with gameplay being similar to the original. The game was published and developed by Cyclone Studios, a division of 3DO. Upon release, it garnered praise for its variety of levels as well as its gameplay, but drew criticism for its graphical presentation.

== Gameplay ==
The gameplay is similar to the first Uprising game, in which players use a tank called the Wraith to destroy enemy units and give orders to their factories and allied units. Players can also zoom into the citadel and use its heavy cannons. The citadel is a protective tower that also automatically fires at enemies.

The left stick controlled the movement of the Wraith and the right stick controlled the camera.

== Plot ==
It has been nearly two hundred years since the beginning of the rebellion, when a small but capable band rose up against the forces of the oppressive Imperium regime. Their early battles went extremely well: they had caught the Imperium forces completely off-guard, and managed to wrest control of several strategically valuable planets. The Wraith technology, which they had stolen from the Imperium, had served them above all expectations. The rebel forces, now led by General Karella Ashe, have managed to take over a large area of Imperium space, and have been forcing the Imperium to fall back from their positions. A displaced alien race, the Xaja (Zai-ya), first encountered during the course of the war in a nearby sector of space, have thrown their limited but useful resources behind the Rebel factions. Although the war is far from settled, up to now things have fared well for the rebels.

Despite being extremely short on resources, the Xaja technology is significantly advanced compared to that currently employed by either the rebels or the Imperium. Although the rebels are relieved to have the support, they remain understandably wary of the newcomers: the Xaja are a closed, inexpressive race, and their primary motivations are not entirely understood by humans.

With defeat imminent, Emperor Caston, the Imperium leader, has just upped the ante in the war, with the surprise introduction of a new weapon of mass destruction. This weapon was recently unleashed on a rebel-held planet in the Lien system - it left no trace of life on the planet.

The player character's record within the Rebel hierarchy now places them in an invaluable position: they will command the Wraith - the most powerful weapon in the rebel arsenal - and their mission will be to prevent the Imperium from using their "planet-killing" weapon again.

== Production ==
The code for Uprising X's graphical engine was written from scratch in a combination of C and assembly.

== Reception ==
Reception

Aggregate score
Aggregator	Score
GameRankings	72%

Review scores
Publication	Score
AllGame	3.5/5
CNET Gamecenter	8/10
Electronic Gaming Monthly	5.5/10
Game Informer	4.75/10
GameFan	71% (Note: Three critics of GameFan gave the game each a score of 72, 74, and 67.)
GamePro	3.5/5 (Note: GamePro gave the game two 3.5/5 scores for graphics and overall fun factor, 3/5 for sound, and 4/5 for control.)
GameSpot	6.3/10
IGN	8/10
Next Generation	4/5
Official U.S. PlayStation Magazine	3/5
PlayStation: The Official Magazine	4/5

The game received above-average reviews according to the review aggregation website GameRankings.

PSM complimented the game on being like "a first person shooter" but with a few "neat twists to distinguish it from the rest of the PlayStation's library" as well as praising it for its "learning curve" and saying the missions later on in the campaign mode "become more varied than the earlier 'go from point A to B' missions". One drawback was that while they appreciated the two player modes, they said it was "tough to get a good view of the action in split screen" which "hampered them a little". IGN complimented the variety of different level types, also praising the game for balancing out "strafe-blasting action with deployment strategy and hunt-and-search missions." GameSpot praised the game for its music and its mix of action and strategy, as well as complimenting the game for its "nicely designed" tutorial level that made "understanding the basics of the game and getting the control down less of a chore". While they felt the game was very challenging and fun, one drawback was that the graphics were "nothing special". Next Generation called it "a unique and welcome addition to the PlayStation library."
