= BattleTanx: Global Assault =

1999 video game

- North American Nintendo 64 cover art
- Developer: The 3DO Company
- Publisher: The 3DO Company
- Platforms: Nintendo 64, PlayStation
- Release: Nintendo 64: NA: October 12, 1999; EU: April 2000; PlayStation: NA: March 14, 2000; EU: June 30, 2000
- Genre: Action
- Modes: Single player, multiplayer

BattleTanx: Global Assault is an vehicular combat game developed and published by The 3DO Company for the Nintendo 64 and PlayStation, in which players control futuristic tanks in a post-apocalyptic scenario. It is a sequel to the Nintendo 64 game BattleTanx, which utilized the same method of game play. Although it earned relatively positive reviews from critics, 3DO went bankrupt before another sequel could be released.

== Gameplay ==
BattleTanx: Global Assault gives the player control of a tank as they battle across a post-apocalyptic world in both campaign mode and multiplayer mode. Score is tallied each time the player destroys a target, whether that be enemy tanks, bunkers, or turrets, or completing certain objectives such as capturing QueenLords or beating a level's par time. The player can also pick up power-ups to increase their score and give them certain advantages, such as the use of special weapons or powers.

Multiple types of tanks available to the player in both campaign and multiplayer modes, some of which also have special abilities that the player can activate.

- Mototank: Combining a motorcycle fork and half-track, these are fast, light vehicles capable of making tight turns but trade armor for their speed.
- M1A1 Abrams: The heavy tank of the US Army during the Apocalypse, the Abrams tank is a fearsome machine fielded by many Tribes.
- Goliath: A super-heavy tanks designed for base defense, it carries a 210mm cannon and can travel quickly when mounted on railway tracks.
- Rattler: A light tank that is almost as fast and maneuverable as the Mototank, it carries a 30mm Gatling Gun.
- FLP-E: "Full Lateral Propulsion - Experimental" or "Flippy", this tank can easily strafe its opponent.
- Inferno: A flamethrower tank, it is deadly at close range and can spray flames out to its sides.
- Hovertank: Using experimental anti-gravity technology, this European light tank is a challenge to maneuver but can be fast and agile in the right hands.
- Marksman: A medium tank that mounts a laser cannon as its main weapon, making it an excellent sniper.
- Hornet: A low-tech American tank which carries twin missile launchers, these can be fired straight ahead or curved to either side.
- Hydra: A light French tank mounting two rapid-fire guns for leveling buildings and hitting fast-moving targets.
- Rhino: A heavy tank destroyer that carries six inches of Chobham composite armor on its front, making it practically invulnerable, but with no protection on the sides or rear.

During campaign mode, some tanks will be restricted from selection and the player must have enough "tank bucks" to purchase their tank. These are earned during the course of the game but if the player runs out of tank bucks, the game ends. Levels take place in multiple cities across the United States and Europe, some which have specific objectives that must be completed to proceed. Campaign mode can be played by one or two players, with both players sharing the same pool of tank bucks.

Multiplayer mode can be played with up to 4 players and/or computer-controlled opponents simultaneously. The different game types include:

- Deathmatch Mode: First player to 10 kills wins
- Battlelord Mode: First player to capture all of their opponents' QueenLords and return them to their base wins.
- Tank Wars Mode: Teams of tanks battle each other for 3 minutes, at the end of which the team with the highest score wins.
- Frenzy Mode: QueenLords appear randomly on the map; the first player to rescue 10 of them wins.
- Convoy Mode: Players must either protect or destroy the convoy as it crosses the map.
- Hold 'Em Mode: The player who seizes the QueenLord that appears in the center of the map, returns to their base and holds her for 30 seconds win.
- Family Mode: Similar to Deathmatch but ammunition is unlimited and power-ups are used in preference to the main cannon when picked up.

As in the original game, players also choose which faction to play in multiplayer mode. Each will be restricted to certain tank types and automatically start with a power-up.

- Griffin's Army: The army Griffin Spade used to rescue his wife Madison and begin a new nation in San Francisco. Their starting power-up is the Gun Buddy turret and they deploy the M1A1 Abrams, Inferno, Hover and Goliath tanks.
- Madison's Militia: Madison's portion of the army, their starting power-ups are Health and Guided Missile, and they can deploy FLP-E, Mototanks, Rattler and Rhino tanks.
- Skull Riderz: Outlaw motorcycle clubs who prowl the interstate highways, their starting power-ups are Grenades and Mines and can deploy Mototanks, Inferno, Rattler and Hornet tanks.
- Dark Angels: Religious fanatics who believe their mission is to reshape the world in their God's name, they receive the Cloaking power-up and field Rhino, Inferno, M1A1 Abrams and Goliath tanks.
- Shadow Ops: Former CIA and other covert ops survivors, this gang rules Washington, D.C. and specialize in stealth and assassination. Their starting power-up is Teleport and they wield Hovertanks, FLP-E, Marksman and Rhino tanks.
- Crimson Guard: A gang that controls most of London, Plasma Bolts are their starting power-up and they field Inferno, Mototanks, Hovertanks and Goliath tanks.
- Iron Maidens: Rivals of the Crimson Guard, this tribe of female survivors control the West End of London. They start with the Shield power-up and deploy Goliath, M1A1 Abrams, FLP-E and Rhino tanks.
- Les Miserables: A Parisian gang of slaves ruled by the QueenLord Cassandra, these women and children were forced to militarize to defend the city. They start with the Swarmer Missile and Bouncing Betty power-ups and deploy the Hydra, Mototank, Inferno and Rattler tanks.
- Cold Warriors': A gang of insane soldiers that occupy Berlin and continue to fight the Apocalypse long after it ended, they will sometimes start with the Nuke power-up and fight using the Hornet, Marksman, Rhino and Goliath tanks.
- Storm Ravens: A ruthless group of warrior women who patrol the western United States and serve Cassandra in exchange for knowledge about the Edge. They start with the Laser and Turbo power-ups and deploy Rattler, Mototank, FLP-E and Hovertanks.

== Synopsis ==
=== Setting ===
In 2001 an outbreak of the "X-2 Virus" caused the death of 99.9% of all women worldwide. Desperate to protect their remaining female population, national governments began rounding up and placing them in quarantine zones, causing rioting and civil strife. Nations fractured and launched attacks on their neighbors to secure their women, leading eventually to a global nuclear war which devastates more than half the planet. With the collapse of civilization, militant groups rise up to seize territory: "Gangs" who are ruthless in attacking others, and "Tribes" that seek to live in peace. The few remaining women rule these groups as "QueenLords" who command the jealous adoration of the male population.

Griffin Spade survives the nuclear destruction of New York City by seizing a National Guard Abrams tank and escaping. Moving west, he builds up his own Tribe with the goal of finding his fiancée Madison, who had been relocated by the government to California. Defeating many Gangs along the way, Griffin's army arrives at San Francisco, where he reunites with Madison. They establish themselves in the city with Madison as QueenLord and Griffin as BattleLord. By 2006 the pair are in the midst of rebuilding civilization and raising their three-year-old son Brandon, although Griffin has been plagued by strange visions of a sinister QueenLord.

=== Plot ===
On January 13th, 2006, the QueenLord Cassandra launches an attack on San Francisco. Her goal is to kill Griffin and Madison before they can learn to use "the Edge," a strange power they do not realize they possess, and kidnap Brandon. While the initial attack on San Francisco Airport is defeated, Cassandra uses "the Edge" herself to hypnotize Griffin and Madison's army and turn against them. The pair escape with Brandon and discover more about Cassandra and her operations both in America and Europe, including the use of local Gangs to abduct people and send them to Texas for genetic testing. Upon freeing the prisoners they find secret documents that reveal she is using Washington, D.C. as her American headquarters.

Leaving Brandon behind in a fallout shelter, the two travel to Washington and defeat Cassandra's forces on the National Mall, capturing vital information about her operations. However, Cassandra hypnotizes Brandon into using the Edge to escape the fallout shelter and takes him to the White House. Griffin and Madison call upon the Edge to help defeat her there but she escapes by helicopter with Brandon. Knowing she is fleeing to Europe after being driven out of America, the two put together an amphibious force to cross the Atlantic Ocean.

Arriving in London, Griffin and Madison gain the Iron Maidens as allies by helping them defeat the Crimson Guard at the Houses of Parliament, cross Tower Bridge and take down the Crimson Lord at the Tower of London. They then move on Paris where Cassandra has secret labs and capture them along with her scientists. After defeating her forces on the Champs-Élysées, they destroy the laser-armed Eiffel Tower to stop it from broadcasting her radio signals, only to learn a startling secret: Cassandra was behind the plague. She designed the X-2 Virus to bring out the latent Edge powers in those women who had it and eliminate those who didn't, in the belief that it represented the future for humanity.

Griffin and Madison chase Cassandra to Berlin to rescue their son and prevent him from being used in her plans. They cross through the Brandenburg Gate, succeed in rescuing Brandon, and escape the city to return to a liberated San Francisco. Cassandra amasses an amphibious force to attack the city again but is defeated. As she retreats, Cassandra hypnotically commands Brandon to "burn the world" with his powers, but Griffin and Madison are able to break the mind control and stop him in time. The pair attack Cassandra's base on Alcatraz Island and kill her in battle before she can enact her "Doomsday plan." With their family reunited, Griffin and Madison celebrate their victory with the promise they will use their powers to build a better world. However, the game ends on a cliffhanger as a mysterious figure finds Cassandra's body and uses his powers to resurrect her.

== Reception ==
Reception

Aggregate score
Aggregator	Score	
Aggregator	N64	PS
GameRankings	76%	48%

Review scores
Publication	Score	
Publication	N64	PS
AllGame	3.5/5	3.5/5
CNET Gamecenter	7/10	3/10
Electronic Gaming Monthly	7.125/10 (Note: In Electronic Gaming Monthly's review of the Nintendo 64 version, two critics gave it each a score of 8/10, one gave it 6.5/10, and the other gave it 6/10.)	N/A
Game Informer	7.25/10	7/10
GameFan	(J.W.) 92% 83% (Note: In GameFan's viewpoint of the Nintendo 64 version, three critics gave it each a score of 80, 86, and 82.)	N/A
GameRevolution	B+	N/A
GameSpot	7.2/10	5.5/10
Hyper	51%	N/A
IGN	8.2/10	4.5/10
N64 Magazine	81%	N/A
Next Generation	3/5	N/A
Nintendo Power	7.6/10	N/A
Official U.S. PlayStation Magazine	N/A	1.5/5

The Nintendo 64 version received favorable reviews, while the PlayStation version received unfavorable reviews, according to the review aggregation website GameRankings. Doug Trueman of NextGen said of the former console version, "Players looking for mass destruction will enjoy this title, but gamers looking for more realistically paced action and strategy should wait until Tokyo Wars hits [the] Dreamcast".

Ash of GamePro said of the N64 version in its November 1999 issue, "One minor beef isn't enough to detract from the immense enjoyment of BattleTanx: Global Assault. After all, there are now seven new tanks to choose from – who cares how you control 'em – just pick a turret, any turret, hop in, and blow up stuff!" (Note: GamePro gave the Nintendo 64 version three 4.5/5 scores for graphics, sound, and fun factor, and 4/5 for control.) Five issues later, Jake the Snake said of the PlayStation version, "If you like fast action and blowing stuff up, BattleTanx: Global Assault offers [a] great... well, bang for your buck." (Note: GamePro gave the PlayStation version two 4/5 scores for graphics and sound, and two 4.5/5 scores for control and fun factor.)
