= Jonny Moseley Mad Trix =

2001 video game

- Developer: The 3DO Company
- Publisher: The 3DO Company
- Platforms: PlayStation 2 Game Boy Advance
- Release: December 2001
- Genre: Snowboarding
- Mode: Single-player

Jonny Moseley Mad Trix is a skiing video game published and developed by The 3DO Company. The game is based on the skier of the same name.

== Gameplay ==
In Jonny Moseley Mad Trix, players are invited into the world of extreme skiing, fronted by Olympic gold medalist Jonny Moseley and a roster of athletes including Tanner Hall, Beth "Wild Child" Clark, and the eccentric "Skier X." The game offers two primary modes: Freeride, which allows unrestricted exploration and trick execution, and Competition, which includes Ski Camp (training), Slopestyle (trick-based scoring), and Big Mountain (natural terrain racing). The goal is to perform high-speed stunts and earn medals, with the promise of being featured in a Matchstick Productions ski film if successful. Gameplay leans heavily on arcade-style mechanics. Players can chain tricks using blue and red multipliers scattered across the slopes.

== Development ==
In November 2000, The 3DO Company signed a deal with Jonny Moseley in which he would star in a series of extreme skiing games. Jonny Moseley Mad Trix was officially announced in May 2001. The soundtrack for Jonny Moseley Mad Trix was distributed by Palm Pictures.

== Reception ==
Reception

Aggregate scores
Aggregator	Score	
Aggregator	GBA	PS2
GameRankings	44%	47%
Metacritic	N/A	44%

Review scores
Publication	Score	
Publication	GBA	PS2
GameSpot	N/A	2.9/10
IGN	N/A	3.0/10

Jonny Moseley Mad Trix received mixed reviews from critics. IGN rated the game a 3 out of 10, praising the soundtrack, graphics and presentation while criticizing the stale gameplay. GameZone rated the game 9 out of 10. On GameRankings the game holds a 47% rating for the PlayStation 2 version and a 44% rating for the Game Boy Advance version respectively.

In a retrospective interview, Jonny Moseley commented "The reviews were mixed. I think skiers kind of liked it, and I think gamers were less into it. What made Tony Hawk work was that it didn't matter if you were into skateboarding or not, it was just a fun game. From a gaming perspective—and I'm not a big gamer—I'm not sure Mad Trix really hit the mark."
