= Tony Garcia (video game producer) =

- Occupation: Video game producer
- Employer: Unity Technologies

Tony Garcia is a video game producer.

From 1988 to 1991 Garcia was the Director of Development at Lucasfilm Games, where he was the producer for Secret Weapons of the Luftwaffe and Indiana Jones and the Fate of Atlantis and others. In 1991, Garcia was a founder of Microsoft Game Studios, where he completed the acquisition of Sublogic (the developer of Microsoft Flight Simulator) and was part of the DreamWorks Interactive joint venture. He became head of The 3DO Company's PC development division in Redmond, Washington in 1996. In 1997, Garcia was appointed as General Manager of Electronic Arts (EA), Seattle.

Garcia was hired as head of Business Development for Unity Technologies in 2009.
