= GoDai: Elemental Force =

2002 video game

Godai Elemental Force
- European cover art
- Developer: The 3DO Company
- Publisher: The 3DO Company
- Director: David Fruin
- Designer: Benjamin Cholewinski
- Composer: Ashif Hakik
- Platform: PlayStation 2
- Release: NA: January 21, 2002; EU: March 1, 2002
- Genre: Action
- Mode: Single-player

GoDai: Elemental Force is a video game released by The 3DO Company for PlayStation 2 in 2002. Initially the game was scheduled to release in Fall 2001.

== Gameplay ==
GoDai is a 3D action game with emphasis on melee combat. The game's environments are displayed through fixed camera angles.

The player controls a ninja named Hiro, who starts the game unarmed but can collect a variety of Asian weapons throughout the game. These include blades such as swords and knives, spears and axes; all of which can be used to execute combo attacks. Larger weapons such as polearms have a longer reach, allowing Hiro to attack enemies without getting too close. Two weapons that the player has previously collected can be taken into each subsequent mission, more appear throughout the missions themselves, allowing Hiro to increase the amount of weapons he is carrying. Ranged weapons including shurikens and smoke bombs, and several types of ranged magical attacks like fireballs, can also be employed in tandem with close-quarters weapons.

Hiro possesses the ability to glide through the air by willpower alone, during which the player retains full control of Hiro's movement as he descends. The effect has been likened to wire-fu movies and takes the place of jumping in the game, allowing the player to bypass combat and traverse the game world. Some enemies are able to use this ability too, and will pursue Hiro through the air. Hiro also has the ability to roll, a dodging move, which is accompanied by a Max Payne-like bullet-time effect.

== Reception ==
Reception

Aggregate score
Aggregator	Score
Metacritic	27/100

Review scores
Publication	Score
EP Daily	1/10
GameSpot	3.3/10
GameSpy	17%
IGN	2.5/10
Official U.S. PlayStation Magazine	1.5/5

The game received "generally unfavorable reviews" according to the review aggregation website Metacritic. Pong Sifu of GamePro said, "Though the game's gliding feature is an inspired concept, trying to execute it, as well as most other moves, can be incredibly irritating due to extremely temperamental and unresponsive controls. Skip this one and watch The Swordsman II [sic] instead." (Note: GamePro gave the game 2/5 for graphics, 3/5 for sound, and two 1.5/5 scores for control and fun factor.)

The game was nominated for the "Worst Game of the Year on PlayStation 2" award at GameSpot's Best and Worst of 2002 Awards, which went to Gravity Games Bike: Street Vert Dirt.
