= BattleSport =

1996 video game

- Developers: Cyclone Studios; Unexpected Development (PS, SS, Windows)
- Publishers: Studio 3DO (3DO); Acclaim Entertainment (PS, SS, Windows)
- Platforms: PC, PlayStation, Saturn, 3DO
- Release: 3DO; NA: 1996; Sega Saturn; NA: July 1997; Windows; NA: June 1997; PAL: January 1, 1997; PlayStation; NA: July 3, 1997; PAL: August 1, 1997
- Genre: Sports
- Modes: Single-player, multiplayer

BattleSport is a 1996 futuristic sports video game developed by Cyclone Studios. It was originally published by Studio 3DO (the software division of The 3DO Company) for the 3DO Interactive Multiplayer in 1996. After the 3DO was discontinued BattleSport was published for other systems by Acclaim Entertainment. It was released for Windows and PlayStation, Sega Saturn, and Windows in North America in July 1997, and in Europe on August 1, 1997.

== Development ==
Director Evan Margolin summarized the making of the game:

We're all big action gamers here [at Cyclone Studios]. We wanted to create a fast-action, arena-based combat game and experimented with a 3D engine for it. When we got the basic engine up and running, the game was basically just about putting the ball into the goal, but when we started playing more, we found that people really want an opportunity to blast each other. One of the most difficult parts of design was getting a 3D engine with which we were satisfied. We didn't want to sacrifice speed, we wanted the game to be fast, and those were things we weren't willing to compromise on.

Near the end of 1996, Studio 3DO stated that a version of BattleSport for the Panasonic M2 was in development.

== Reception ==
Reception

Review scores
Publication	Score
AllGame	4/5 (3DO); 2.5/5 (SAT)
Electronic Gaming Monthly	5.875/10 (PS1)
GameSpot	6/10 (PS1)
Next Generation	5/5 (3DO)

GamePro gave the 3DO version a recommendation. While they said the game is harder than it should be due to slippery controls and an overabundance of powerups to flip through, they felt the strong graphics, audio, and fast-paced gameplay "make this a game worth playing." A reviewer for Next Generation gave the game an even stronger recommendation, praising the unique gameplay concept, exceptionally good polygon graphics by 3DO standards, huge variety of power-up items, and consistently smooth frame rate even in the multiplayer mode, which he was especially enthusiastic about: "As with any split-screen, having your view so vertically limited is distracting, but the sheer fun and excitement of competing in this game against another human player is incredible."

Though the 3DO version failed to reach a mass audience, it sold well enough to turn a profit.

The game was less well-received when it appeared on the PlayStation, with critics praising the huge number of arenas and options but railing against the unnecessarily frustrating handling of the vehicles. Dan Hsu elaborated in Electronic Gaming Monthly, "It's difficult to catch the ball at any time, unless it's sitting still, or you and it are heading toward each other in a straight line." Commenting on the game's arcade-style simplicity, having little variety or long-term objectives to keep the player engaged, Jeff Kitts stated in GameSpot, "the fact is that there's just no need for a game like this on the PlayStation in 1997."

== Sequel ==
A sequel, BattleSport II, was planned for the Nintendo 64, and PlayStation, but never released.
