= Gobs of Games =

2000 video game

- Developer: 2N Productions
- Publisher: The 3DO Company
- Platform: Game Boy Color
- Release: September 2000
- Genre: Puzzle
- Modes: Single-player, Multiplayer

Gobs of Games, released in Europe as Games Frenzy, is a 2000 video game for the Game Boy Color developed by 2N Productions and published by The 3DO Company, who showcased the game at E3 2000. The game is a compilation of compilation of puzzle games, including simplified iterations of traditional games, including peg solitaire, checkers and tic tac toe.

== Gameplay ==
A screenshot of Gobs of Games, depicting one of the peg games in the compilation.

Gobs of Games is a compilation of fourteen puzzle games under four categories: Peg Games, Paper Games, Puzzles and Board Games. 'Peg Games' resemble variations of peg solitaire and require the player to clear a board by removing pegs by 'jumping' over them in a manner similar to checkers. 'Paper Games' include variations on dots and boxes, hangman and tic tac toe. 'Puzzle Games' involve Scramble, a slide puzzle game, and Move It, a game similar to Sokoban. Board Games include checkers.

== Reception ==
Reception

Review scores
Publication	Score
AllGame	3/5
IGN	5/10

Gobs of Games received mixed reception from critics, who questioned the desirability of a title containing games that could easily be played on pen and paper. Writing for IGN, Craig Harris stated that as "most of the games...can easily be played with a pen and paper, to expect folks shell out 30 bucks per player is a little absurd." Nick Woods of Allgame concurred, stating "you can simply draw the games on paper," whilst noting the games "offer enough diversity to keep you coming back, and the option to play against a friend adds to the replay value."
