= Vegas Games 2000 =

Casino simulation video game

- Developers: New World Computing, Inc. (Windows); The 3DO Company (PlayStation); Digital Eclipse Software, Inc. (GBC)
- Publisher: The 3DO Company
- Platforms: Microsoft Windows; PlayStation; Game Boy Color
- Release: October 7, 1999 (PS)
- Genre: Gambling simulation
- Modes: Single-player; Multiplayer

Vegas Games 2000, known as Vegas Games: Midnight Madness, Midnight in Vegas in Europe and Vegas Games on Game Boy Color, is a gambling simulation video game. It was released on Microsoft Windows in 1998, then released in 2000 on PlayStation and Game Boy Color. New World Computing, who developed the PC version, had previously published More Vegas Games and several other Vegas Games titles.

== Gameplay ==
The roulette table in the PlayStation version

=== Microsoft Windows ===
Vegas Games 2000 is a collection of twenty-five casino games and variations, including baccarat; money wheel; blackjack, including variations with one, two, four and six decks; craps; keno; poker, including 5 card draw, 5 card stud, 7 card stud, Texas hold'em and jacks or better; roulette; slot machines, including five themes; video keno; and video poker, including five variations. Each player starts off with an initial $5000, and statistics are kept showing how well the player performs on each game.

The game includes a multiplayer mode wherein up to seven players could compete in table games through MPlayer. It was rereleased in 2000 under the name Vegas Games: Midnight Madness and split into two versions: Slots & Videos and Table Games.

=== PlayStation ===
The PlayStation version features seven games with a total of 21 variations between them, including blackjack, craps, poker, video poker, roulette, baccarat and slots. It has a multiplayer mode which allows up to four players.

=== Game Boy Color ===
The Game Boy Color version features eight games with over 20 variations between them, including keno, money wheel, baccarat, slots, video poker, craps, roulette, and blackjack. The multiplayer allows for up to four players, utilized by handing the system off for each player's turn.

== Reception ==
Reception

Review scores
Publication	Score
Consoles +	65%
Eurogamer	4/10
IGN	(PC/PS) 4/10 (GBC) 3/10
Nintendo Power	7.3/10 (GBC)
Official U.S. PlayStation Magazine	3.5/5
PlayStation: The Official Magazine	2.5/5
Superjuegos	83/100
Video Games (DE)	4/10 (GBC)
Extreme	23%

IGN, reviewing the PC and PlayStation version of the game, gave it a 4/10 and called "some of the graphic decisions [...] a little perplexing" and the game a "disappointment" musically. They praised the roulette game but criticized the poker AI, stating: "it would have been nice to have a more challenging group of opponents." They called the game's "multitude of options [...] thoroughly confusing", citing a lack of a tutorial. PlayStation Magazine criticized the game for a lack of innovation and poor sound but praised the graphics as "sharp and clear" and the controls as "easy to understand and use". They gave it a final score of 2.5 out of 5, calling it "almost too squeaky clean" to emulate the feel of a real casino, instead recommending the game for "gamers under 18 or people who realize the inherent pitfalls of gambling for real money". Official U.S. PlayStation Magazine called the AI "timid" but called the interface "intuitive" and the style "simple" and "unpretentious", calling its approach "no-frills" and giving it a 3.5 out of 5.

Spanish gaming magazine SuperJuegos gave Midnight in Vegas an 83/100, stating the sound could be improved but that the game, "sufficiently fulfills the expectations that gambling game lovers may have." French gaming magazine Consoles Plus gave the PlayStation version of the game a 65%, criticizing the graphics. French gaming website Jeuxvideo gave the PlayStation version an 8/20, calling the interface "overwhelmingly ugly" and the graphics "sloppy" but praising replayability. UK PlayStation magazine Extreme gave it a 23%, calling it "basically [...] a complete waste of money" and criticizing it for "bad graphics", "minimal sound", and "zero presentation". Eurogamer called Midnight Madness "tripe", describing it as a "painstakingly accurate recreation" of the gambling games "with a nice GUI tacked on top" and criticizing it as "lacking imagination and fun". They compared it to shareware and gave it a 4/10.

=== Game Boy Color version ===
German magazine Video Games gave the Game Boy Color version a 4/10, citing a lack of fun or "sense of achievement". IGN called it "not even close" to a fun game and gave it a 3/10, citing a password save mechanic that only saves money and not statistics, a "clunky interface", a "confusing" multiplayer system, and the game giving you "no sense of victory" when you win. Nintendo Power gave it a 7.3/10, with the game's sound being its lowest-rated aspect. Nintendo Official Magazine gave it a score of 80%, saying "the games have enough to keep you coming back again and again".
