= Centurion: Defender of Rome =

1990 video game

- Developer: Bits of Magic
- Publisher: Electronic Arts
- Designer: Kellyn Beck
- Platforms: MS-DOS, Amiga, Sega Genesis, FM Towns, NEC PC-9801
- Release: 1990 (DOS); 1991 (Amiga, Genesis); 1993 (FM Towns, PC-98)
- Genres: Turn-based strategy, real-time strategy, action
- Mode: Single-player

Centurion: Defender of Rome is a turn-based strategy video game with real-time battle sequences, designed by Kellyn Beck and Bits of Magic and published by Electronic Arts. Originally released for MS-DOS in 1990, the game was later ported to the Amiga and the Sega Genesis in 1991. Centurion shares much of the concept and feel with Beck's earlier game Defender of the Crown (1987).

== Plot ==
The game begins in Ancient Rome in the year 275 BC, placing the player in the sandals of a centurion in the Roman army, at first leading a single legion. The player's ultimate goal is to become a Caesar through a mix of successful military conquests and internal politics of "Bread and Circuses".

== Gameplay ==
The bulk of the game involve turn-based strategic planning and management on the world map and the real-time battles (with on-demand pauses to give orders to formations) against various enemies of the Roman Empire, such as the Celts, Carthaginians and Parthians. Centurion also featured other "side-show" activities, such as gladiatorial combat (the player's duties involve financing the ludi events), chariot racing in the Circus Maximus, and naval battles. There is also some diplomacy (it is even possible to seduce the queen Cleopatra after forming an alliance with Egypt).

== Development ==
The game's designer, Kellyn Beck, was also the creator of several Cinemaware games and Centurion was similar in look to those games, featuring "cinematic" graphics, animation and sound effects. His inspiration for the game came from watching the films Ben Hur and Spartacus and the game's working title was Caesar. The team Bits of Magic, who co-designed and programmed the game, included Nicky Robinson.

== Reception ==
The PC version of Centurion received 3 out of 5 stars in Dragon. Other magazines, however, usually gave the game better reviews, with scores mostly in the range of 75-90%. Computer Gaming World gave it three-plus stars out of five in 1990. The magazine praised the VGA graphics and audio, and said that as a game as opposed to an accurate historical simulation, Centurion "succeeds admirably ... those who liked those old gladiator movies" would enjoy it. In 1993, the magazine gave the game two-plus stars, describing it as a "graphical tour de force—a historic tour de farce".

== Reviews ==
- Consoles Plus (September 1991)
- Raze (August 1991)
- Amiga Action (June 1991)
- CU Amiga (April 1991)
- ASM (Aktueller Software Markt) (July 1991)
- Zero (June 1991)
- ACE (Advanced Computer Entertainment) (September 1991)
- Zero (August 1990)
- Amiga Computing (August 1991)
- Amiga Format (July 1991)
- ACE (Advanced Computer Entertainment) (September 1990)
- Tilt (September 1991)
- ASM (Aktueller Software Markt) (September 1991)
- Video Games (September 1991)
- Amiga Joker (June 1991)
- Amiga Power (June 1991)
- The Games Machine (August 1990)
- Amiga Power (July 1991)

== See also ==
- Annals of Rome
- Rome: Pathway to Power
