= Gulf War: Operation Desert Hammer =

1999 video game

- Cover art
- Developer: The 3DO Company
- Publisher: The 3DO Company
- Platform: Windows
- Release: NA: August 19, 1999
- Genre: Action
- Modes: Single player Multiplayer

Gulf War: Operation Desert Hammer is an action game developed and published by The 3DO Company in 1999.

== Gameplay ==
The game has M1 Tanks during the Gulf War, and it is one of the first games about Desert Storm and features Saddam Hussein as a final enemy.

== Reception ==
Reception

Aggregate score
Aggregator	Score
GameRankings	50%

Review scores
Publication	Score
AllGame	2.5/5
Computer Games Strategy Plus	2/5
Computer Gaming World	3/5
Game Informer	3/10
GameSpot	5.1/10
GameStar	73%
IGN	3.3/10
Next Generation	2/5
PC Accelerator	5/10
PC Gamer (US)	68%

The game received mixed reviews according to the review aggregation website GameRankings. John Lee of NextGen said of the game, "There's some entertaining play here, but it doesn't last long. The missions get monotonous. You drive around in 3D sand and blow up tanks and trucks and buildings. And that's about it. In fact, it's rare to find such an arcade-style action game on PC, and playing this shows why."
