= Twisted: The Game Show =

1993 video game

- Developer: Studio 3DO
- Publishers: NA: Electronic Arts; JP: Electronic Arts Victor
- Director: Jim Eisenstein
- Producers: Stewart J. Bonn; Trip Hawkins
- Designer: Jim Eisenstein
- Programmers: Chris McFall; Frank Sandoval; Larry Reed
- Artists: Annabella Serra; David Nakabayashi; Ease Owyeung
- Writer: Marti McKenna
- Composers: Ed Bogas; Gary Clayton; Joe Buzcek
- Platform: 3DO Interactive Multiplayer
- Release: NA: 1993; JP: 23 December 1994
- Genre: Party
- Modes: Single-player, multiplayer

Twisted: The Game Show is a 1993 party video game developed by Studio 3DO and published by Electronic Arts for the 3DO. The game features up to four characters, representing various stereotypical television and commercial personalities, competing in an interactive board game. The goal is to reach the end of the board, while contending with spaces and occasional minigames that can hinder or further progress.

== Contestants ==
There are six playable characters, each with their own catch phrase and each representing a different TV or commercial personality:

Wormington is a used car salesman. He is seen in the game with his dog, Otis. His catch phrase is, "Come on down to Wormington's, where service is a slogan!"

Madame Elaine is a late-night fortune teller. Her catch phrase is, "Call me at 1-900-Elaine! I can read your mind...and you should be ashamed!"

Johnny Pow is an Asian-American who is anachronistically obsessed with American 1950s greaser culture. His catch phrase is, "Keep cool, daddy-o!"

Humble Howard is a televangelist. His catch phrase is, "Eternal security in the kingdom of Humble Howard. Operators are standing by."

Major Steel is a military-esque fitness buff. Her catch phrase is, "You’ll get fit if it kills ya."

Uncle Fez is an animated Pez dispenser. His catch phrase is, "Give mez a chance. What do you say?"

== Gameplay ==
=== Cyber-Die ===
To move up the board, the player must roll the Cyber-Die, a screen consisting of three rows and nine columns with numbers ranging from 0–2. A selector bounces back and forth in each row. When the player stops the die, it adds the 3 highlighted numbers together to determine how many squares the player moves. The totals range from 0–6.

Rolling a 0 ends the player's turn.

If a player lands on a space occupied by a different contestant, that player gets another roll of the Cyber-Die.

=== Game Board ===
The game board (also known as the "Palindrome") is a vertical twisted helix consisting of a 90-space climb to the winner's platform at the top. The board consists of four different types of spaces:

The Challenge Square (Yellow): Directs the player to pick a mini game for the opportunity to roll again.

The Bonus Square (Green space w/ orange square): Roll again.

The Bozo Square (Red space w/ yellow triangle): Lose a turn.

The Wheel of Torture (Purple space w/ yellow circle): Sends the player to a spinning wheel mini-game where they must match 3 shapes in a row. If they fail, the turn ends and the player must attempt the mini-game again next turn.

=== The Matrix ===
When a player lands on a challenge square, he is taken to The Matrix screen. The Matrix has three columns and three rows. A randomly chosen contestant will choose a row from the matrix, after which the player in control chooses a column. The intersecting space determines whether the player participates in a mini-game or takes one of three special actions:

Roll Again: Allows the player to roll the Cyber-Die again.

Switcheroo: The player and a randomly selected contestant switch places on the game board.

Bomb: Ends the player's turn.

=== Mini Games ===
Trivia: There are six topics: Science and Technology, History, Sports and Recreation, Arts and Entertainment, Geography and Travel, and Pop Culture. The question difficulty is based on the skill level the player chooses at the beginning. The "Expert" difficulty requires the player to answer three questions, where the others only require the player to answer one question.

Twin Peeks: There are 12 doors or windows on the screen. The player must match the 6 different pictures before time runs out.

Sound Bites: This is a matching game with pictures of former presidents. There are 12 total squares. When the player selects one, a sound is played. The player must then find the space with the identical sound before time runs out.

Face Lift Salon: Faces on the screen are split into three rows the player can slide side to side. The object is to align the rows to make the three complete side by side faces. There are many combinations but only one is correct. There are 200 different faces the game can choose from and it adjusts the difficulty based on the player's previous performance.

Zapper: Twelve small TV screens display a black and white videos. One switches to a color picture which the player must select. The player must prevent the color commercial from getting more than five seconds of air time within 30 seconds to win. If the player zaps the 3DO logo that pops up briefly, he wins instantly.

Departure Lounge: An image will appear on the screen cut into nine tiles and mixed with a different image. Select the tile and rotate each tile to rebuild the original picture before time runs out.

Mystery Matinee: A full black and white video is scrambled while running. Unscramble the video before time expires. The number of pieces to unscramble depends on the difficulty level and the player's previous performance.

Supermarket Highrise: An elevator door opens for a few seconds and shows the player a set of 12 grocery store items. The door then closes and the player sees three items, two of which were not on the shelf. The player must choose the item that was in the previous set.

== Winning ==
The first player to reach the top of the helix wins the game and a "trip to reality." Players do not need to land on the finish square by exact count.

== Reception ==
Reception

Review scores
Publication	Score
Electronic Gaming Monthly	8.2/10
GamePro	16.5/20
3DO Magazine	3/5
Aktueller Software Markt	8/12
Digital Press	7 / 10
Entertainment Weekly	A−
Game Players	78%
Games World	73/100
Génération 4	90%
Joystick	90%
VideoGames	9/10

Twisted: The Game Show was positively received by critics. Electronic Gaming Monthly gave it an 8.2 out of 10, calling it "a hilarious game show with very funny contestants and excellent categories. ... The skill levels also make the game inviting for everyone – regardless of age." GamePro, though they criticized the game as lacking replay value, praised the sharpness of the graphics and commented that "No current game has a wider range of speech or sound effects. Every tone, every gasp, every laugh is crystal clear, and every time someone opens their mouth they say something funny."
