= 3DO Games: Decathlon =

- Developer: The 3DO Company
- Publisher: The 3DO Company
- Platform: Windows
- Release: November 1996
- Genre: Sports

3DO Games: Decathlon, also known as 3DO Decathlon Games, is a 1996 video game developed and published by The 3DO Company. It was released in November 1996.

== Gameplay ==
The game presents a series of decathlon events in which the player performs running, jumping, and throwing by rhythmically tapping two buttons and pressing an action button to execute each attempt, with a Training Mode that allows practice of these mechanics.

== Reception ==
Reception

Review scores
Publication	Score
GameSpot	4.2/10
PC Gamer	60%
Power Play	25%
PC Games	29%
PC Joker	63%

Games Domain called Decathlon a serious contender to the worst creation in Sports Gaming. PC Gamer liked the look of the polygonal players in Decathlon but disliked the sterile presentation.
