= List of biosafety level 4 organisms =

List of organisms that require handling with the most severe protocol

Biosafety level 4 (BSL-4) organisms are dangerous or exotic agents which pose high risk of life-threatening disease, aerosol-transmitted lab infections, or related agents with unknown risk of transmission.

== US federal biocontainment regulations ==
Biosafety level 4 laboratories are designed for diagnostic work and research on easily respiratory-acquired viruses which can often cause severe and/or fatal disease. What follows is a list of select agents that have specific biocontainment requirements according to US federal law. Organisms include those harmful to human health, or to animal health. The Plant Protection and Quarantine programs (PPQ) of the Animal and Plant Health Inspection Service (APHIS) are listed in 7 CFR Part 331. The Department of Health and Human Services (HHS) lists are located at 42 CFR Part 73.3 and 42 CFR Part 73.4. The USDA animal safety list is located at 9 CFR Subchapter B.

Not all select agents require BSL-4 handling, namely select bacteria and toxins, but most select agent viruses do (with the notable exception of SARS-CoV-1 which can be handled in BSL-3). Many non-select agent viruses are often handled in BSL-4 according to facility SOPs or when dealing with new viruses closely related to viruses that require BSL-4. For instance, Andes orthohantavirus and MERS-CoV are both non-select agents that are often handled in BSL-4 because they cause severe and fatal disease in humans. Newly characterized viruses closely related to select agents and/or BSL-4 viruses (for example newly discovered henipaviruses or ebolaviruses) are typically handled in BSL-4 even if they are not yet known to be readily transmissible or cause severe disease.

== International BSL-4 regulations ==
Globally, there are no official agreements on what agents must be handled in BSL-4. However, select agents and toxins originating or ending in US BSL-4 labs must adhere to US select agent laws.

== Select agents ==
=== HHS human threats: select agents and toxins ===
- Crimean-Congo hemorrhagic fever orthonairovirus
- Ebolavirus
- Lassa mammarenavirus
- Lujo mammarenavirus
- Marburg virus
- Spanish flu virus
- Chapare mammarenavirus
- Guanarito mammarenavirus
- Argentinian mammarenavirus (formerly Junín virus)
- Machupo mammarenavirus
- Brazilian mammarenavirus (formerly Sabiá mammarenavirus)
- Far Eastern subtype Flavivirus
- Siberian subtype Flavivirus
- Kyasanur Forest disease virus
- Alkhurma virus
- Omsk hemorrhagic fever virus
- Variola major and minor (smallpox)

=== HHS human or animal threats: select agents and toxins ===
- Hendra henipavirus
- Nipah henipavirus
- Rift Valley fever phlebovirus
- Venezuelan equine encephalitis virus

=== Non-select agents ===
- Andes orthohantavirus
