= The 3DO Company =

American video game company

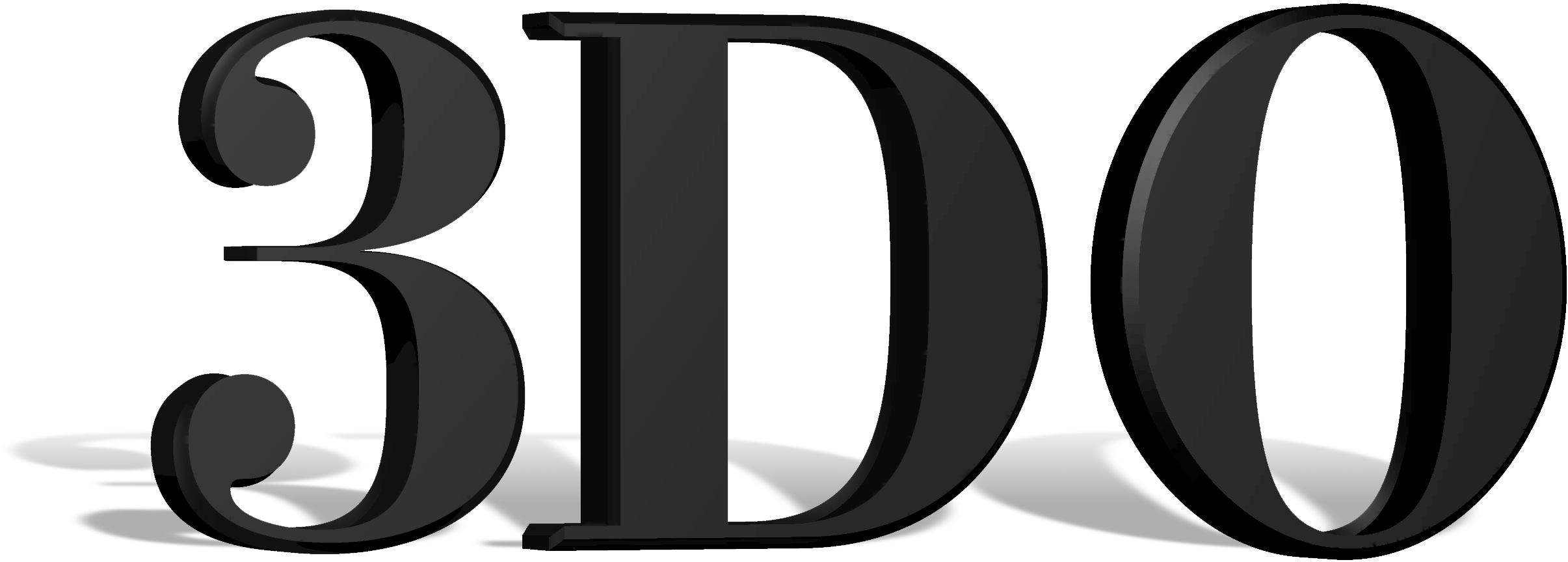
- The final logo used from 1997 until May 2003
- Type: Public
- Traded as: Nasdaq: THDO
- Industry: Video games
- Founded: September 12, 1991; 35 years ago
- Defunct: May 28, 2003; 23 years ago
- Fate: Chapter 11 bankruptcy
- Headquarters: Redwood City, California, U.S.
- Key people: Trip Hawkins, RJ Mical, Dave Needle
- Products: 3DO; Army Men series; Battletanx series; High Heat Major League Baseball series; Might and Magic series
- Subsidiaries: New World Computing

The 3DO Company was an American video game company based in Redwood City, California. It was founded in 1991 by Electronic Arts founder Trip Hawkins in a partnership with seven other companies to develop the 3DO standard of video gaming hardware. When 3DO failed in the marketplace, the company exited the hardware business and became a third-party video game developer and published well-known games series like Army Men, Battletanx, High Heat Major League Baseball and Might and Magic. It went bankrupt in 2003 due to poor sales of its games.

== History ==
=== Hardware developer (1991-1996) ===
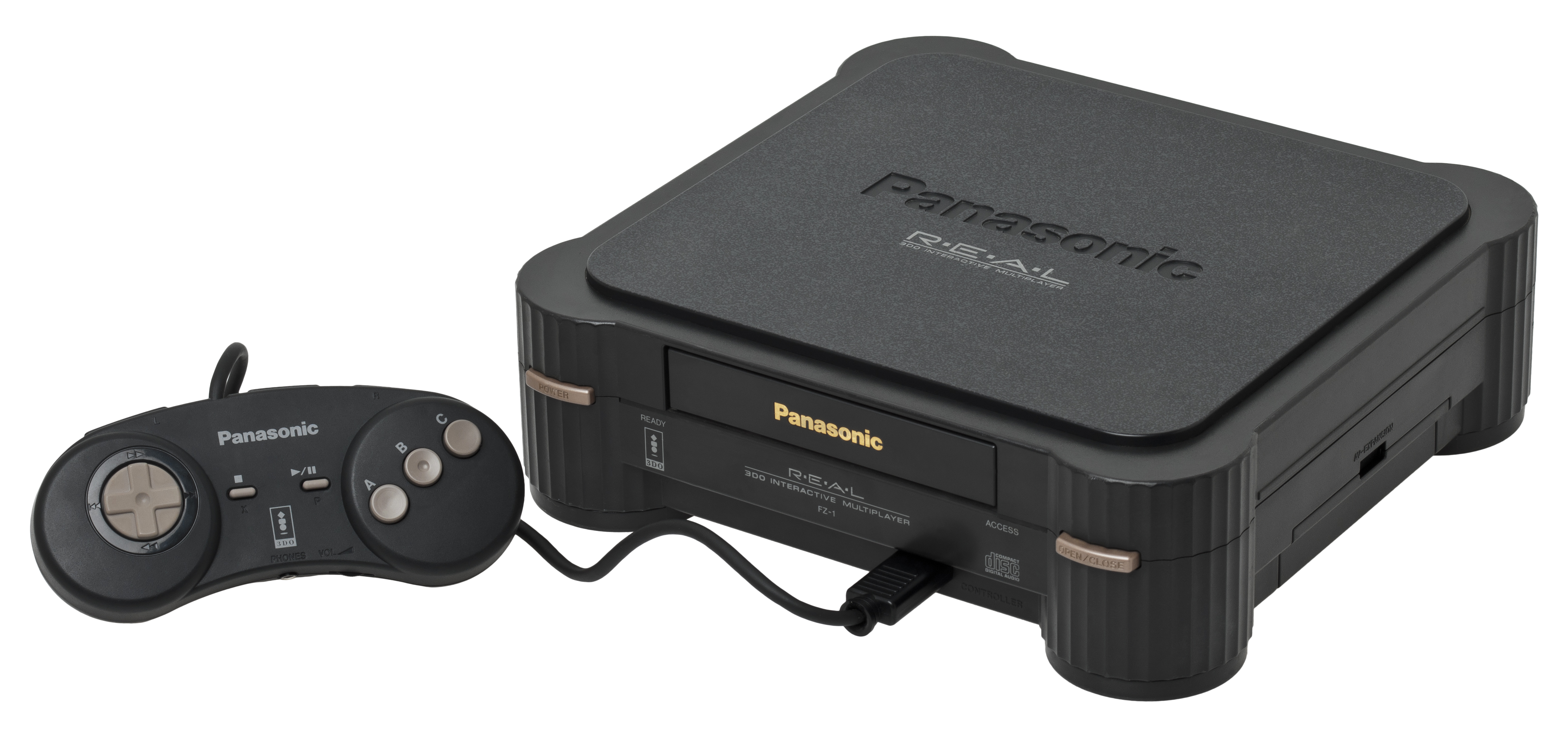
A Panasonic FZ1, the first commercially released 3DO system

Trip Hawkins wanted to get into the hardware market after the software market exploded with interest thanks to his involvement at Electronic Arts. When the company was first founded, its original objective was to create a next-generation CD-based video game system specified as the 3DO, which would be manufactured by various partners and licensees; 3DO would collect a royalty on each console sold and on each game manufactured. For game publishers, 3DO's $3 royalty per sold game was very low compared to the royalties Nintendo and Sega collected from game sales on their consoles. The 3DO Company and its initiative received the backing of several industry figures including AT&T, Electronic Arts, Goldstar, Matsushita (owner of Panasonic), MCA, and Time Warner.

The launch of the first 3DO system in October 1993 was well-promoted, with a great deal of attention in the mass media as part of the "multimedia wave" in the computer world, the first player being a Panasonic model at the price of US$699 (equivalent to $1,600 in 2025). Poor console and game sales trumped the enticingly low royalty rate and proved a fatal flaw. While 3DO's business model attracted game publishers with its low royalty rates, it resulted in the console selling for a price higher than the SNES and Sega Genesis combined, hampering sales. While companies that manufactured and sold their own consoles could sell them, at a loss, for a competitive price, making up for lost profit through royalties collected from game publishers, the 3DO's manufacturers, not collecting any money from game publishers, and owing royalties to the 3DO Company, had to sell the console for a profit, resulting in high prices. As the console failed to compete with its cheaper competitors, game developers and publishers, while initially attracted by low royalties, dropped support for the console as its games failed to sell. Stock in the 3DO Company dropped from over $37 per share in November 1993 to $23 per share in late December. Though the company's financial figures dramatically improved in the fiscal year ending March 1995, with revenues nearly triple that of the previous fiscal year, they were still operating at a loss. The console's prospects continued to improve through the first half of 1995 with a number of critical success, including winning the 1995 European Computer Trade Show award for best hardware.

=== Third-party developer (1996-2003) ===
In January 1996, The 3DO Company sold exclusive rights to its next generation console, M2, to Matsushita for $100 million. Thanks in part to revenues from the sale of M2 technology to Matsushita and other licensees, in the first quarter of 1996 the 3DO Company turned a profit for the first time since it was founded, with a net income of $1.2 million. Over the second half of 1996, the company restructured to focus on software development and online gaming, in the process cutting its staff from 450 to 300 employees. President Hugh Martin was given full operating control, while Hawkins remained with the company as chairman, CEO, and creative director. The M2 would never launch, as Matsuhita cancelled it in 1997.

After selling the M2 technology to Matsushita, the company acquired Cyclone Studios, New World Computing, and Archetype Interactive. 3DO established a new office in Redmond, Washington devoted to PC games development, with Tony Garcia as its head. In mid-1997 it sold off its hardware business to Samsung for $20 million, making a final break from its origins as a console developer.

The company's biggest hit was its series of Army Men games, featuring generic green plastic soldier toys. Its Might and Magic and especially Heroes of Might and Magic series from subsidiary New World Computing were perhaps the most popular among their games at the time of release. During the late 1990s, the company published one of the first 3D MMORPGs: Meridian 59, which survives to this day in the hands of some of the game's original developers. Heroes of Might and Magic III (1999) saw unexpected success in Eastern Europe due to its low performance requirements, hotseat multiplayer and localization in Polish and Russian. In May 1999, 3DO opened up a European branch, entitled 3DO Europe.

=== Bankruptcy and legacy ===
3DO struggled in the early 2000s. According to the SEC, the company reported a net loss of over $10m in the nine months to December 2002. The company filed for Chapter 11 bankruptcy on May 28, 2003. Employees were laid off without pay. Three companies explored buying the company outright, but an ongoing SEC investigation into the accounting practices of the industry made this less attractive. Instead, the company's assets were put up for sale in an auction. Many of the assets such as game brands and other intellectual property were sold to rivals like Microsoft (High Heat Baseball), Namco (Street Racing Syndicate), Take-Two Interactive (Army Men) and Ubisoft (Might and Magic, Heroes of Might and Magic). Founder Trip Hawkins paid $405,000 for rights to some old brands and the company's "Internet patent portfolio". The Army Men brand sold for $750,000, then a high amount in games acquisition terms. The company was void from early 2003, but its registered securities continued to exist until the conclusion of the SEC investigation in 2008. The SEC issued trading restrictions and revoked the securities in December 2008.

I no longer own any 3DO IP, don't keep track of it and don't personally know any owners. Finding it would be like discovering the Ark of the Covenant! Nearly 30 years ago Matsushita and Samsung bought the system and hardware IP and the people involved then have retired. 3DO game software IP was auctioned off in 2003. Microsoft bought High Heat Baseball, Ubisoft bought Might and Magic. I believe Army Men is now owned by Take Two. Mystery solved? — Trip Hawkins, Founder EA & 3DO

Some of the former 3DO IPs remained active for years after the studio's closure. The Army Men franchise was in use on console till 2008 and continued longer on mobile, concluding with Army Men Strike: Toy Wars in 2017. The Might and Magic franchise is still active under Ubisoft as of 2026.

In April 2020, the rights to over 30 classic 3DO titles were purchased from Prism Entertainment by Ziggurat Interactive, a company which specialises in re-releases of older games. The company cited a desire to bring more classics to digital storefronts, and broader efforts towards game preservation. Their work has included the remastered Killing Time, which was released in 2024. In late June 2026, Işık Şekercigil, a British–Turkish dual citizen with a background in mobile gaming, claimed to have acquired the 3DO trademark and the intellectual property for some games by the 3DO Company with plans to revive the console and remaster the games. The former was to include a retro console and a licensable console ecosystem, akin to the original 3DO. Throwback Entertainment, which had previously acquired the 3DO's trademark, refuted these claims and said it had never transferred its ownership. Josh Fairhurst, the CEO of Limited Run Games, corroborated that the ownership had not changed hands and branded the revival announcement "not legitimate". In early July, Şekercigil claimed that he had obtained the trademark for "The 3DO Company" instead of the console's "3DO" brand. He further announced the abandonment of his plans for the 3DO revival, citing ownership claims raised over both games and hardware, as well as the fear of prolonged legal issues.

== List of games ==
=== Developed ===
Title	Alternative title	Notes
3DO Games: Decathlon		
Army Men		PC version.
Army Men: Air Attack	Army Men: Air Combat (on Nintendo 64)	PC, Nintendo 64, and PlayStation version.
Army Men: Air Attack 2	Army Men: Air Attack - Blade's Revenge (in EU)	
Army Men: Air Combat - The Elite Missions		
Army Men: Air Tactics		
Army Men: Green Rogue	Army Men: Omega Soldier (in EU)	
Army Men: Sarge's Heroes		
Army Men: Sarge's Heroes 2		Nintendo 64, PlayStation, and PlayStation 2 version.
Army Men: Toys in Space	Army Men in Space (in EU)	
Army Men: World War		
Army Men: World War - Final Front	Army Men: Lock 'n' Load (in EU)	
Army Men: World War - Land, Sea, Air		
Army Men: World War - Team Assault		
Army Men 3D		
Army Men II		PC version.
BattleTanx		Nintendo 64 version.
BattleTanx: Global Assault		
Blade Force		
Captain Quazar		
Crusaders of Might and Magic		
Club 3DO: Station Invasion		
Dragon Rage		
Escape from Monster Manor		
Family Game Pack Royale	Family Game Pack (on PS)	
Game Guru (3DO)		
Godai Elemental Force		
Groovy Bunch of Games		
Gulf War: Operation Desert Hammer		
High Heat Major League Baseball 2002		PC, PlayStation, and PlayStation 2 version.
High Heat Major League Baseball 2003		PC and PlayStation 2 version.
High Heat Major League Baseball 2004		
Jonny Moseley Mad Trix		PlayStation 2 version.
Jurassic Park Interactive		
Killing Time		3DO version by Studio3DO; Win95 and Mac port completed by Logicware, Inc.
Meridian 59: Vale of Sorrow		
Portal Runner		PlayStation 2 version.
Sammy Sosa High Heat Baseball 2001		
Sammy Sosa Softball Slam		
Shifters		
Twisted: The Game Show		
Vegas Games 2000	Midnight in Vegas (in EU)	PlayStation version.
Warriors of Might and Magic		PC, PlayStation, and PlayStation 2 version.
WarJetz	World Destruction League: WarJetz	
World Destruction League: Thunder Tanks		PlayStation and PlayStation 2 version.
Zhadnost: The People's Party		

=== Published ===
Title	Developer(s)	NA	EU	Notes
3DO Buffet	Interplay	Yes	No	
Action Man: Destruction X	Blitz Games	No	Yes	Licensed from Hasbro Interactive.
Alex Ferguson's Player Manager 2001	ANCO	No	Yes	
Army Men	Digital Eclipse	Yes	Yes	Game Boy Color version.
Army Men: Air Combat	Fluid Studios	Yes	Yes	Game Boy Color version.
Army Men: Operation Green	Pocket Studios	Yes	Yes	
Army Men: RTS	Pandemic	Yes	PC/PS2	The GameCube version was co-produced with Coyote Developments Ltd.
Army Men: Sarge's Heroes 2	GameBrains/3d6 Games	Yes	Yes	Game Boy Color version.
Army Men: Turf Wars	Möbius Entertainment	Yes	No	
Army Men 2	Digital Eclipse	Yes	Yes	Game Boy Color version.
Army Men Advance	DC Studios	Yes	Yes	
Aqua Aqua	Zed Two	Yes	No	
Arcomage	New World Computing	Yes	No	
BattleSport	Cyclone Studios	Yes	Yes	Other releases than the 3DO published by Acclaim
BattleTanx	Lucky Chicken Games	Yes	Yes	Game Boy Color version.
Chaos Overlords	Stick Man Games	Yes	Yes	
Cubix: Robots for Everyone - Clash 'n Bash	Human Soft	Yes	No	
Cubix - Robots for Everyone: Race 'N Robots	Blitz Games	Yes	PS only	
Cubix: Robots for Everyone - Showdown	Blitz Games	Yes	No	Released days after 3DO went defunct.
Gobs of Games	2^{n} Productions	Yes	Yes	Also known as Games Frenzy in Europe.
Gridders	Tetragon	Yes	Yes	
Heroes Chronicles series	New World Computing	Yes	Yes	
Heroes of Might and Magic (Game Boy Color)	KnowWonder Digital; Mediaworks	Yes	Yes	
Heroes of Might and Magic: Quest for the Dragon; Bone Staff	New World Computing	Yes	Yes	
Heroes of Might and Magic II: The Succession Wars	New World Computing	Yes	Yes	
Heroes of Might and Magic II: The Price of Loyalty	Cyberlore Studios	Yes	No	
Heroes of Might and Magic III	New World Computing	Yes	Yes	Also known as Heroes of Might and Magic III: The Restoration of Erathia.
Heroes of Might and Magic III: Armageddon's Blade	New World Computing	Yes	Yes	
Heroes of Might and Magic III: The Shadow of Death	New World Computing	Yes	Yes	
Heroes of Might and Magic IV	New World Computing	Yes	Yes	
Heroes of Might and Magic IV: The Gathering Storm	New World Computing	Yes	Yes	
Heroes of Might and Magic IV: Winds of War	New World Computing	Yes	Yes	
High Heat Baseball 1999	Team .366	Yes	No	
High Heat Baseball 2000	Team .366	Yes	No	
High Heat Major League Baseball 2002	Möbius Entertainment	Yes	Yes	Game Boy Advance version.
High Heat Major League Baseball 2003	Möbius Entertainment	Yes	Yes	Game Boy Advance version.
The Horde (video game)	Crystal Dynamics	Yes	Yes	MS-DOS, Sega Saturn and FM Towns
Jonny Moseley Mad Trix	GFX Construction/RTG; Studios	Yes	Yes	Game Boy Advance version.
Jumpgate: The Reconstruction Initiative	NetDevil	Yes	No	
Killing Time	Studio3DO	Yes	No	3DO version - 1995
Killing Time	Logicware	Yes	No	PC & Mac ported version for Mac & PC/Win95; small print release on Mac and an even smaller print-run on PC/Win95
Legends of Might and Magic	New World Computing	Yes	Yes	
Mathemagics	L3 Interactive	Yes	No	
Meridian 59	Archetype Interactive	Yes	No	First edition of the game (1996).
Might and Magic VI: The Mandate of Heaven	New World Computing	Yes	No	
Might and Magic VII: For Blood and Honor	New World Computing	Yes	Yes	
Might and Magic VIII: Day of the Destroyer	New World Computing	Yes	Yes	
Might and Magic IX	New World Computing	Yes	Yes	
Player Manager 2000	ANCO	No	Yes	
Phoenix 3	Gray Matter Studios	Yes	No	
Portal Runner	Handheld Games	Yes	No	Game Boy Color version.
Requiem: Avenging Angel	Cyclone Studios	Yes	No	
Snow Job	Ix Entertainment	Yes	Yes	
Soccer Kid	Team17	Yes	No	3DO version only - 1994. Original game made by Krisalis.
Spaceward Ho! IV	GhostNose Software (Delta Tao licensed)	Yes	No	
Star Fighter	Krisalis	Yes	No	3DO version only developed by Tim Parry and Andrew Hutchings, and original game developed by Fednet Software. Ports developed and published by Acclaim Entertainment and in Europe by Telstar. Also known as Star Fighter 3000.
Sven-Göran Eriksson's World Cup Challenge	ANCO	No	Yes	PlayStation and PlayStation 2 version.
Sven-Göran Eriksson's World Cup Manager	ANCO	No	Yes	PlayStation and PlayStation 2 version.
The Need for Speed	Electronic Arts	Yes	Yes	
TOCA Championship Racing	Codemasters	Yes	No	
Uprising: Join or Die	Cyclone Studios	Yes	No	
Uprising 2: Lead and Destroy	Cyclone Studios	Yes	No	
Uprising X	Cyclone Studios	Yes	No	
Vegas Games	Digital Eclipse	Yes	Yes	Game Boy Color version.
Vegas Games 2000	New World Computing	Yes	No	PC version. Also known as Vegas Games: Midnight Madness.
Warriors of Might and Magic	Climax	Yes	Yes	Game Boy Color version.
World Destruction League: Thunder Tanks	Sunset Entertainment	Yes	Yes	Game Boy Color version.

=== Canceled ===
- Army Men: Arcade Blasts
- Army Men: Platoon Command
- Army Men: Sarge's Heroes 3
- Army Men: Sarge's War (Released by Global Star Software)
- The Four Horsemen of the Apocalypse

=== Distributed (U.S. only) ===
- Pinball Builder: A Construction Kit for Windows
- Pinball Gold Pack

== 3DO Rating System ==
The 3DO Rating System was a rating system created by The 3DO Company and used on games released for the 3DO Interactive Multiplayer. The rating system, which went into use in March 1994, uses the following four categories:

- E - Everyone
- 12 - Guidance for age 12 & under
- 17 - Guidance for age 17 & under
- AO - Adults Only

These ratings would appear on the lower front and back of the packaging, while the back of the packaging also specified what content was present in the game. In late 1994, the majority of 3DO's competitors signed on with a new rating system from the Entertainment Software Rating Board; despite this, the 3DO Company opted to continue providing their own rating system, leaving publishers of 3DO games to decide whether to use the 3DO Rating System or the new ESRB ratings. The 3DO rating for each game was designated voluntarily by the game's publisher, in contrast to the ESRB ratings, which were determined independently by the ESRB.
