= Mail Order Monsters =

1985 video game

- Developer(s): Paul Reiche III; Evan Robinson; Nicky Robinson
- Publisher(s): NA: Electronic Arts; EU: Ariolasoft
- Designer(s): Paul Reiche III
- Platform(s): Commodore 64, Atari 8-bit
- Release: 1985: C64; 1986: Atari 8-bit
- Genre(s): Action, strategy
- Mode(s): Single-player, multiplayer

Mail Order Monsters is an action-strategy computer game created by Paul Reiche III, Evan Robinson, and Nicky Robinson. It was published by Electronic Arts (Ariolasoft in Europe) for the Commodore 64 in 1985, then released for Atari 8-bit computers in 1986. Players create monsters which they can use to battle multiplayer or against computer-controlled opponents.

== Gameplay ==
Customizing a monster

The players create a variety of monsters and equip them with futuristic and modern weapons to do battle. Monsters can be further customized through buying special abilities, such as adding tentacles to use advanced weaponry. Two players can fight against each other, play capture the flag, or compete for a high score against a computer-controlled horde. In single-player mode, the computer controls an opponent to fight. Battles take place on various different maps that can have tactical effects, such as mountains for agile monsters to hide behind during combat. Monsters can be stored on diskette and can be upgraded by victories against other monsters or computer opponents.

== Development ==
Reiche had previously worked with designers Jon Freeman and Anne Westfall of Free Fall Associates on the game Archon for EA. The game was originally envisioned as dark and gritty, but Electronic Arts demanded a more whimsical style. During this development, Reiche became fascinated with his friend Greg Johnson's development on Starflight, and spent a few weeks consulting on it before he realized he was "supposed to be working on Mail Order Monsters".

== Reception ==
Ahoy! stated that Mail Order Monsters for Commodore 64 was a "very good game" that did not reach "true excellence" because of insufficient combat tactics, and suggested that it was best for younger players. The magazine later described the game as "pure light-hearted mayhem", with exciting action that partially compensated for "the lack of mental challenge". Writing in Vintage Games, Bill Loguidice and Matt Barton identify it as a precursor to the Pokémon series.

In a retrospective, Levi Buchanan of IGN said that although he would love to see a remake, any new version, updated to suit modern gamers, would necessarily have to diverge from what made the game unique in 1985.
