= BattleTanx =

1998 video game

- North American Nintendo 64 cover art
- Developers: The 3DO Company; Lucky Chicken Games (GBC)
- Publisher: The 3DO Company
- Designer: Michael Mendheim
- Platforms: Nintendo 64, Game Boy Color
- Release: Nintendo 64: NA: December 29, 1998; Game Boy Color: NA: March 28, 2000; EU: 2000
- Genre: Action
- Modes: Single-player, multiplayer

BattleTanx is a 1998 vehicular combat game released for the Nintendo 64, produced by The 3DO Company. Set in a post-apocalyptic world where a virus has wiped out nearly all women, the player controls a tank and must fight across the former United States against other tank-armed gangs. The game was followed by a 1999 sequel, titled BattleTanx: Global Assault.

== Gameplay ==
In BattleTanx the player can control one of three different tank types: the MotoTank, a light hybrid vehicle combining a motorcycle fork and half-track treads; the M1A1 Abrams main battle tank; or the Goliath heavy tank, armed with a 210mm cannon and able to quickly traverse on railway tracks to defend fortresses. The objective is to score the most points by destroying enemy tanks, bunkers and gun turrets, as well as capturing QueenLords or beating a level's par time. Various power-ups can also be acquired during gameplay to increase score and give the player advantages, such as restoring health and ammo, additional weapons, and special powers.

The game features a campaign mode with 17 levels to complete in order to finish the single player game, all of which are filled with enemy tanks. Each level is located in a specific place in the United States, such as State Street and Pier 39. The game features destructible environments, and in some cases, interactive environments. Bonus levels allow the player to increase their score by controlling a Goliath tank facing waves of enemy tanks.

In the game's multiplayer mode, players can battle with up to 3 other players and/or computer-controlled opponents simultaneously. They may also choose which map to play on, with options based on the single-player levels and a generic arena battlefield. There are four different multiplayer configurations:

- Deathmatch: The first player to seven kills is the winner. Tank selection is based on which faction is chosen, minus one Goliath tank from their lineup.
- Battlelord: The first player to capture their opponents' QueenLord wins. QueenLords are kept in fortresses defended by a Goliath tank.
- Family Mode: A variant of Deathmatch with unlimited ammo but power-ups are used in preference to the main cannon when picked up.
- Annihilation: Each team spawns with their five tanks simultaneously - one controlled by the player and the rest computer-controlled - and the last player with tanks remaining wins.

Players also choose which faction or Tribe to play as in multiplayer mode, each of which have their own combination of the game's three tank types and starting power-up.

- The Urban Decay: New York City street gangs who have been mutated into maniacal cannibals. Their starting power-up is the Swarmer Missile and multiplayer lineup is four M1A1s and one Goliath tank.
- Psycho Brigade: An army of psychiatric hospital patients and convicts. They start with the Shield power-up and are outfitted with two M1A1s, two MotoTanks, and a Goliath tank.
- Skull Riderz: Outlaw motorcycle clubs who prowl the interstate highways. They start with the Guided Missile power-up and wield four MotoTanks and a Goliath tank.
- Mech Maniax: Survivalists and right-wing militias. Their starting power-up is the Gun Buddy turret and multiplayer lineup is two MotoTanks, two M1A1s, and a Goliath tank.
- Charlie Company: Remnants of the US Army. They start with the Laser power-up and field two MotoTanks, one M1A1, and two Goliath tanks.
- Nuclear Knights: A secret government super soldier program. The Nuke is their starting power-up and they deploy in multiplayer with five Goliath tanks.
- After Shocks: Freaks, punks and mutant survivors of SoCal. They start with two power-ups — Grenades and Mines — and their multiplayer lineup is three MotoTanks, one M1A1, and one Goliath tank.
- Dark Angels: Religious fanatics who believe their mission is to reshape the world in their God's name. They receive the Cloaking power-up and start multiplayer with two MotoTanks, two M1A1s, and one Goliath tank.
- Griffin's Army: The player character's army in the campaign mode. Their power-up in multiplayer is randomly assigned and are outfitted with four M1A1s and one Goliath tank.

== Synopsis ==
=== Setting ===
On January 3rd, 2001, the Centers for Disease Control and Prevention identifies a novel virus which only targets female humans. Labeled a Level 4 Hot Agent, this "X2 Virus" has a 99.9% fatality rate. Unfortunately, it was initially presumed to be an influenza-type organism and so quarantine measures were not enforced, allowing the outbreak to quickly spread. On March 23rd, as female death rates increase astronomically, the United States government declares martial law. US Army and National Guard units are deployed to all major cities with orders to evacuate every female to secured quarantine zones in Northern California. Other countries take similar measures.

Discontent at this course of action causes many men to riot and form militia groups to combat their national governments. On April 19th, civil war erupts in the US as renegade National Guard units start attacking government forces. Countries across the world similarly fracture, and those with significant military forces invade their neighbors to secure their female populations. When China invades Russia to seize their quarantine zones, they respond with tactical nuclear weapons.

The global nuclear war which followed causes civilization to end on May 6th. From a pre-plague population of 260 million, just 50 million male survivors and 50,000 female survivors are left in the former United States. Facing extinction, militarized gangs called Tribes form around the surviving women. These women - known as "QueenLords" - function as both tribal rulers and holy entities of jealous adoration to the men they lead. Meanwhile the man who has proven himself to be the strongest, the most cunning, and the greatest leader in battle is declared the "Battle Lord" of the Tribe.

=== Plot ===
On the same day martial law is declared, Griffin Spade proposes to Madison in Queens, New York. Madison is among the few women immune to the X2 Virus, but with world starting to collapse, Griffin joins one of the many militias forming to protect his fiancée. However, she does not want him to die protecting her and makes the decision to voluntarily give herself up to government forces. Shortly thereafter New York City is hit with the first of multiple nuclear strikes which wipes out 99% of its population.

Griffin manages to survive the attack and the following months thanks to an abandoned National Guard tank he seized. Believing Madison must have survived somewhere out west, Griffin fights his way out of New York City, crossing from Queens into Manhattan via the Queens–Midtown Tunnel, through Times Square, and across the George Washington Bridge. Heading west, Griffin gathers a small army of followers with the same goal of reuniting with their loved ones. They invade Chicago along Lake Shore Drive, overthrow the Tribes occupying the city, and rescue their QueenLords to secure their own survival.

Leaving behind a portion of his forces to start rebuilding the "Heartland," Griffin pushes west as his fame and army continue to grow. Driven by dreams of Madison and nightmares of a sinister force holding her, Griffin's army takes over Area 51 and Las Vegas from the Tribes occupying them. Arriving at San Francisco, he finds it unscathed, having been spared the nuclear holocaust as it was one of the designated quarantine zones. The city is occupied however by a "Dark Alliance" of Tribes led by the Dark Angels.

Battling their way across the Golden Gate Bridge and into the city, Griffin's army reaches the "Q-Zone", an island fortress where the government quarantined women. In a final confrontation Griffin defeats the Dark Angels and rescues Madison. Reunited with his love, Griffin is proclaimed Battle Lord and together they start to rebuild a new nation.

== Reception ==
Reception

Aggregate score
Aggregator	Score	
Aggregator	GBC	N64
GameRankings	42%	79%

Review scores
Publication	Score	
Publication	GBC	N64
AllGame	3/5	N/A
Electronic Gaming Monthly	N/A	5/10, 6.5/10, 6/10, 6/10
Game Informer	N/A	6.75/10
GamePro	N/A	4.5/5 (Note: GamePro gave the Nintendo 64 version 4/5 for graphics, and three 4.5/5 scores for sound, control, and overall fun factor.)
GameRevolution	N/A	C−
GameSpot	(unfavorable)	5.5/10
Hyper	N/A	77%
IGN	5/10	8/10
N64 Magazine	N/A	74%
Next Generation	N/A	4/5
Nintendo Power	N/A	7.7/10

The Nintendo 64 version received favorable reviews, while the Game Boy Color version received unfavorable reviews, according to the review aggregation website GameRankings. Next Generation said that the former console version was "fast [and] controls well, and it's got tanks blowing up everything in sight – sounds good to us."
