= List of Global Star Software games =

Global Star Software was a Canadian video game publisher based in Mississauga. It was founded in 1995 by Craig McGauley and Damian Cristiani and operated alongside their Triad Distributors, which had been founded in 1993. Both companies were acquired by Take-Two Interactive on 1 September 1999. When the "2K Play" label was added to Take-Two's 2K label on 10 September 2007, 2K absorbed all of Global Star's assets.

== List of games ==
Title	Platform(s)	Release date	Developer(s)	Ref.
350 Great Games	Microsoft Windows	1997	Global Star Software	
Swarm	Microsoft Windows	March 19, 1998	Reflexive Entertainment	
100 Great Linux Games	Linux	2000	Global Star Software	
Moraff's RingJongg: Mahjongg Vol. 2	Microsoft Windows	2000	Moraff Games	
The Untouchable	Microsoft Windows	February 11, 2000	Creative Edge Studios	
Tower of the Ancients	Microsoft Windows	February 13, 2000	Fiendish Games	
Airport Tycoon	Microsoft Windows	April 25, 2000	Krisalis Software	
Master of the Skies: The Red Ace	Microsoft Windows	April 28, 2000	Fiendish Games	
Hot Chix 'n' Gear Stix	Microsoft Windows	August 18, 2000	Fiendish Games	
Search & Rescue 2	Microsoft Windows	November 2, 2000	InterActive Vision	
Muscle Car '76	Microsoft Windows	March 23, 2001	Small Rockets	
Jetboat Superchamps 2	Microsoft Windows	April 9, 2001	Small Rockets	
Excessive Speed	Microsoft Windows	May 11, 2001	Chaos Works / Ganymede Technologies	
Mahjongg Classic	Microsoft Windows	May 24, 2001	Small Rockets	
MAD: Global Thermonuclear Warfare	Microsoft Windows	July 5, 2001	Small Rockets	
Mega Babies	Microsoft Windows	July 17, 2001	Lago	
Akimbo: Kung-Fu Hero	Microsoft Windows	August 1, 2001	Chaos Works	
JetFighter	Palm	August 14, 2001	Mission Studios	
Oil Tycoon	Microsoft Windows	August 23, 2001	Soft Enterprises	
Siege of Avalon	Microsoft Windows	September 17, 2001	Digital Tome	
Train Sim: Activity Pack	Microsoft Windows	September 19, 2001	Lago	
Search & Rescue 3	Microsoft Windows	October 31, 2001	InterActive Vision	
Dragon Tales: Dragon Adventures	Game Boy Advance	November 15, 2001	Handheld Games	
Serious Sam: The First Encounter	Palm	December 7, 2001	InterActive Vision	
Kayak Extreme	Microsoft Windows	December 19, 2001	Small Rockets	
High Rollerz	Microsoft Windows	2002	Purple Software	
The Worlds of Billy 2	Microsoft Windows	January 15, 2002	InterActive Vision	
Red Ace Squadron	Microsoft Windows	February 11, 2002	Small Rockets	
Flight Sim: Scenery Enhancer	Microsoft Windows	February 20, 2002	Lago	
Assimilation	Microsoft Windows	April 14, 2002	Small Rockets	
Muscle Car 2: American Spirit	Microsoft Windows	May 31, 2002	3Romans	
Moraff's Maximum Mahjongg: Volume 2	Microsoft Windows	June 12, 2002	Moraff Games	
Bejeweled & Alchemy	Microsoft Windows	June 28, 2002	PopCap Games	
Age of Sail II: Privateer's Bounty	Microsoft Windows	August 13, 2002	Akella	
The Italian Job	Microsoft Windows	August 14, 2002	Pixelogic	
Airlines 2	Microsoft Windows	October 2, 2002	InterActive Vision	
Take-Out Weight Curling	Microsoft Windows	October 2, 2002	Nathan Sorenson	
Search & Rescue: Coastal Heroes	Microsoft Windows	October 5, 2002	InterActive Vision	
Brainstorm: The Game Show	Microsoft Windows	October 10, 2002	InterActive Vision	
Emergency Services Sim	Microsoft Windows	October 22, 2002	InterActive Vision	
Search & Rescue: Vietnam MED+EVAC	Microsoft Windows	October 31, 2002	InterActive Vision	
World's Greatest Coasters 3D	Microsoft Windows	November 12, 2002	Virtual Playground	
RailKings Model Railroad Simulator	Microsoft Windows	December 4, 2002	IncaGold	
Austin Powers Pinball	Microsoft Windows	January 29, 2003	Wildfire Studios	
Austin Powers Pinball	Palm	January 29, 2003	Wildfire Studios	
Airport Tycoon 2	Microsoft Windows	February 26, 2003	Sunstorm Interactive	
Final Stretch: Horse Racing Sim	Microsoft Windows	April 4, 2003	Cyanide	
Moraff's Maximum Mahjongg: Volume 3	Microsoft Windows	April 30, 2003	Moraff Games	
Muscle Car 3	Microsoft Windows	May 25, 2003	3Romans	
PC Basket 2003	Microsoft Windows	May 29, 2003	DEMSoft	
State of Emergency	Microsoft Windows	July 15, 2003	Wide Games	
Friday Night 3D Bowling	Microsoft Windows	August 12, 2003	Virtual Playground	
Ring II: Twilight of Gods	Microsoft Windows	September 10, 2003	Arxel Tribe	
Friday Night 3D Darts	Microsoft Windows	September 15, 2003	AI Factory	
Ultimate Demolition Derby	Microsoft Windows	September 16, 2003	3Romans	
Mall Tycoon 2	Microsoft Windows	September 24, 2003	Virtual Playground / Fusion Digital Games	
Firefighter 259	Microsoft Windows	October 3, 2003	InterActive Vision	
Friday Night 3D Pool	Microsoft Windows	October 3, 2003	AI Factory	
JetFighter V: Homeland Protector	Microsoft Windows	October 21, 2003	InterActive Vision	
Airport Tycoon 3	Microsoft Windows	October 30, 2003	InterActive Vision / Nikitova Games	
Dora the Explorer: Barnyard Buddies	PlayStation	November 18, 2003	Santa Cruz Games	
Rebel Trucker: Cajun Blood Money	Microsoft Windows	November 25, 2003	3Romans	
Spy Muppets: License to Croak	Microsoft Windows	December 9, 2003	Vicarious Visions	
Ford Racing 2	Microsoft Windows	December 10, 2003	Razorworks	
Vegas Tycoon	Microsoft Windows	January 15, 2004	Deep Red Games	
Luxury Liner Tycoon	Microsoft Windows	January 20, 2004	Virtual Playground	
School Tycoon	Microsoft Windows	February 24, 2004	Cat Daddy Games	
Carve	Xbox	February 26, 2004	Argonaut Games	
Corvette	PlayStation 2	March 9, 2004	Steel Monkeys	
The Road to Baghdad	Microsoft Windows	March 27, 2004	Atomic Games	
Serious Sam Advance	Game Boy Advance	April 12, 2004	Climax Studios	
Serious Sam: Next Encounter	GameCube	April 12, 2004	Climax Studios	
UFC: Sudden Impact	PlayStation 2	April 21, 2004	Opus Corporation	
Serious Sam: Next Encounter	PlayStation 2	April 22, 2004	Climax Studios	
ESPN NFL 2K5	PlayStation 2	July 20, 2004	Visual Concepts	
ESPN NFL 2K5	Xbox	July 20, 2004	Visual Concepts	
In-Fisherman Freshwater Trophies	Microsoft Windows	July 20, 2004	nFusion	
Army Men: Sarge's War	Microsoft Windows	July 27, 2004	Tactical Development / The 3DO Company	
Army Men: Sarge's War	Xbox	August 2, 2004	Tactical Development / The 3DO Company	
Army Men: Sarge's War	GameCube	August 21, 2004	Tactical Development / The 3DO Company	
ESPN NHL 2K5	PlayStation 2	August 30, 2004	Kush Games / Visual Concepts	
ESPN NHL 2K5	Xbox	August 30, 2004	Kush Games / Visual Concepts	
Medieval Conquest	Microsoft Windows	September 6, 2004	Cat Daddy Games	
Army Men: Sarge's War	PlayStation 2	September 7, 2004	Tactical Development / The 3DO Company	
Kohan II: Kings of War	Microsoft Windows	September 21, 2004	TimeGate Studios	
ESPN NBA 2K5	PlayStation 2	September 28, 2004	Visual Concepts	
ESPN NBA 2K5	Xbox	September 28, 2004	Visual Concepts	
Outdoor Life: Sportsman's Challenge	Microsoft Windows	October 5, 2004	Cat Daddy Games	
Robotech: Invasion	PlayStation 2	October 5, 2004	Vicious Cycle Software	
Robotech: Invasion	Xbox	October 5, 2004	Vicious Cycle Software	
Conflict: Vietnam	Microsoft Windows	October 6, 2004	Pivotal Games	
Conflict: Vietnam	PlayStation 2	October 6, 2004	Pivotal Games	
Conflict: Vietnam	Xbox	October 6, 2004	Pivotal Games	
Wildfire	Microsoft Windows	October 7, 2004	Cat Daddy Games	
Outlaw Golf 2	Xbox	October 19, 2004	Hypnotix	
Hidden & Dangerous 2: Sabre Squadron	Microsoft Windows	October 20, 2004	Illusion Softworks	
Scaler	PlayStation 2	October 20, 2004	Artificial Mind and Movement	
Scaler	Xbox	October 20, 2004	Artificial Mind and Movement	
Ski Resort Extreme	Microsoft Windows	October 31, 2004	Cat Daddy Games	
Army Men: RTS	GameCube	November 2, 2004	Coyote Developments	
Codename: Kids Next Door – Operation: S.O.D.A.	Game Boy Advance	November 2, 2004	Vicarious Visions	
ESPN College Hoops 2K5	PlayStation 2	November 17, 2004	Visual Concepts	
ESPN College Hoops 2K5	Xbox	November 17, 2004	Visual Concepts	
Scaler	GameCube	November 17, 2004	Artificial Mind and Movement	
Outlaw Golf 2	PlayStation 2	November 23, 2004	Hypnotix	
Dora the Explorer: Super Star Adventures	Game Boy Advance	November 29, 2004	ImaginEngine	
Ford Racing 2	macOS	December 3, 2004	Feral Interactive	
Gotcha! Extreme Paintball	Microsoft Windows	February 25, 2005	Sixteen Tons Entertainment	
Safari Adventures: Africa	Microsoft Windows	March 16, 2005	Neko Entertainment	
Spy vs. Spy	Xbox	April 7, 2005	Vicious Cycle Software	
American Civil War: Gettysburg	Microsoft Windows	April 28, 2005	Cat Daddy Games	
Spy vs. Spy	PlayStation 2	April 29, 2005	Vicious Cycle Software	
Virtual Pool: Tournament Edition	Xbox	May 11, 2005	Celeris	
Outlaw Volleyball: Remixed	PlayStation 2	May 17, 2005	Hypnotix	
Final Stretch: Horse Racing Sim	macOS	July 3, 2005	Virtual Programming	
Charlie and the Chocolate Factory	Game Boy Advance	July 15, 2005	Digital Eclipse Software	
Charlie and the Chocolate Factory	GameCube	July 15, 2005	High Voltage Software	
Charlie and the Chocolate Factory	Microsoft Windows	July 15, 2005	Backbone Entertainment	
Charlie and the Chocolate Factory	PlayStation 2	July 15, 2005	High Voltage Software	
Charlie and the Chocolate Factory	Xbox	July 15, 2005	High Voltage Software	
Outlaw Tennis	PlayStation 2	July 26, 2005	Hypnotix	
Outlaw Tennis	Xbox	July 26, 2005	Hypnotix	
JetFighter 2015	Microsoft Windows	August 30, 2005	City Interactive	
Codename: Kids Next Door – Operation: V.I.D.E.O.G.A.M.E.	GameCube	October 11, 2005	High Voltage Software	
Codename: Kids Next Door – Operation: V.I.D.E.O.G.A.M.E.	PlayStation 2	October 11, 2005	High Voltage Software	
Codename: Kids Next Door – Operation: V.I.D.E.O.G.A.M.E.	Xbox	October 11, 2005	High Voltage Software	
Mall Tycoon 3	Microsoft Windows	October 26, 2005	Cat Daddy Games	
Ford vs. Chevy	PlayStation 2	November 8, 2005	Eutechnyx	
Ford vs. Chevy	Xbox	November 8, 2005	Eutechnyx	
Sudoku Fever	Game Boy Advance	February 8, 2006	puzzle.tv	
Dora the Explorer: Journey to the Purple Planet	PlayStation 2	February 9, 2006	Monkey Bar Games	
SPLAT Magazine Renegade Paintball	Microsoft Windows	February 17, 2006	Cat Daddy Games	
Classified: The Sentinel Crisis	Xbox	April 13, 2006	Torus Games	
Army Men: Major Malfunction	Xbox	April 14, 2006	Team 17	
Hummer: Badlands	PlayStation 2	April 14, 2006	Eutechnyx	
Hummer: Badlands	Xbox	April 14, 2006	Eutechnyx	
SPLAT Magazine Renegade Paintball	Xbox	June 30, 2006	Cat Daddy Games	
Army Men: Major Malfunction	PlayStation 2	August 4, 2006	Team 17	
Dora the Explorer: Journey to the Purple Planet	GameCube	September 8, 2006	Monkey Bar Games	
Dora the Explorer: Dora's World Adventure	Game Boy Advance	October 9, 2006	Black Lantern Studios	
Family Feud	Game Boy Advance	October 19, 2006	Atomic Planet Entertainment	
Family Feud	Microsoft Windows	October 19, 2006	Atomic Planet Entertainment	
Family Feud	PlayStation 2	October 19, 2006	Atomic Planet Entertainment	
Deal or No Deal	Microsoft Windows	November 6, 2006	Cat Daddy Games	
Carnival Games	Wii	August 27, 2007	Cat Daddy Games	
