= Index of DOS games (J) =

This is an index of DOS games.

This list has been split into multiple pages. Please use the Table of Contents to browse it.

Title	Released	Developer(s)	Publisher(s)
Jabbertalky	1981	Automated Simulations Inc.	Automated Simulations Inc.
Jacaranda Jim	1993	Graham Cluley	
Jack in the Dark	1993	Infogrames	Interplay Entertainment
Jack Nicklaus Golf & Course Design: Signature Edition	1992	Sculptured Software	Accolade
Jack Nicklaus' Greatest 18 Holes of Major Championship Golf	1988	Sculptured Software	Accolade
Jack Nicklaus' Unlimited Golf & Course Design	1990	Sculptured Software	Accolade
Jagged Alliance	1994	Madlab Software	Sir-Tech
Jagged Alliance: Deadly Games	1995	Madlab Software	Sir-Tech, Virgin Interactive
James Bond 007: A View to a Kill	1985	Angelsoft	Mindscape
James Clavell's Shōgun	1989	Infocom	Infocom
James Pond 2: Codename RoboCod	1993	Vectordean Ltd, Millennium Interactive	Millennium Interactive
Jammit	1994	GTE Vantage	GTE Entertainment
Jane's ATF: Advanced Tactical Fighters	1996	Origin Systems	Electronic Arts
Jane's US Navy Fighters 97	1996	Electronic Arts	Electronic Arts
Jazz Jackrabbit	1994	Epic MegaGames, Arjan Brussee	Epic MegaGames
J.B. Harold Murder Club	1991	Riverhill Software	NEC
Jeopardy!	1995	Sharedata	GameTek
Jet	1985	Sublogic	Sublogic
JetFighter: The Adventure	1988	Velocity Development	Velocity Development
Jetfighter 2	1990	Velocity Development	Velocity Development
Jetfighter 2: Advanced Mission Disk	1992	Velocity Development	Velocity Development
Jetfighter III	1996	Mission Studios	Mission Studios
Jetfighter III: Enhanced Campaign CD	1997	Mission Studios	Mission Studios
Jetfighter: Full Burn	1998	Mission Studios	Interplay Entertainment
Jetpack	1993	Adept Software	Software Creations
Jet Set Willy	1984	Software Projects	Software Projects
Jetstrike	1994	Shadow Software	Rasputin Software
Jewels of Darkness	1986	Level 9	Rainbird Software
Jill of the Jungle	1992	Epic MegaGames	Epic MegaGames
Jimmy Connors Pro Tennis Tour	1991	Blue Byte	Ubisoft
Jimmy White's 'Whirlwind' Snooker	1991	Virgin Interactive	Virgin Interactive
Jim Power: The Lost Dimension in 3-D	1993	Loriciel	Loriciel
Jinxter	1987	Magnetic Scrolls	Rainbird Software
Joe & Mac	1991	Elite Systems	Elite Systems/New World Computing
Joe Montana Football	1990	MindSpan	Sega
John Elway's Quarterback	1988	Leland Corporation	Melbourne House
John Madden Football	1988	EA Tiburon	Electronic Arts
John Madden Football II	1991	Electronic Arts	Electronic Arts
Jonah Lomu Rugby	1997	Codemasters	Rage Software
Jones in the Fast Lane	1991	Sierra Entertainment	Sierra Entertainment
Jordan vs. Bird: One on One	1988	Electronic Arts	Electronic Arts
Joshua & the Battle of Jericho	1994	Wisdom Tree Inc.	Wisdom Tree Inc.
Journey: The Quest Begins	1989	Infocom	Infocom
Joust	1983	Atari	Atarisoft
Jr. Pac-Man	1988	Thunder Mountain	Thunder Mountain
J. R. R. Tolkien's Riders of Rohan	1991	Beam Software, Papyrus Design Group	Konami, Mirrorsoft
J.R.R. Tolkien's The Lord of the Rings, Vol. I	1990	Interplay Entertainment	Interplay Entertainment
J.R.R. Tolkien's The Lord of the Rings, Vol. II: The Two Towers	1990	Interplay Entertainment	Interplay Entertainment
J.R.R. Tolkien's War in Middle Earth	1988	Melbourne House	Melbourne House
Judge Dredd	1997	Probe Entertainment	Acclaim Entertainment
Judge Dredd Pinball	1998	Pin-Ball Games Ltd.	Pin-Ball Games Ltd.
Jumpman	1984	Epyx	IBM
Jumpman Lives!	1983	Epyx	Epyx
Jump 'n Bump	1998	Brainchild Design	Brainchild Design
Jungle Book, The	1994	Virgin Interactive	Virgin Interactive
Jungle Hunt	1983		Atarisoft
Jungle Strike	1993	Ocean Software	Electronic Arts
Jurassic Park	1993	Ocean Software	Ocean Software
