= Codename: Kids Next Door – Operation: V.I.D.E.O.G.A.M.E. =

2005 video game

- North American PS2 box art
- Developer: High Voltage Software
- Publisher: Global Star Software
- Composers: Thomas Chase Jones; Steve Rucker
- Series: Codename: Kids Next Door
- Platforms: PlayStation 2, Xbox, GameCube
- Release: NA: October 11, 2005; PAL: December 2, 2005
- Genre: Platform-adventure
- Mode: Single-player

Codename: Kids Next Door – Operation: V.I.D.E.O.G.A.M.E. (Villains In Detention Escape Outpost Growing Amalgamation Mega Enormously) is a 2005 platform game developed by High Voltage Software and published by Global Star Software for the GameCube, Xbox, and PlayStation 2. The game is based on the Cartoon Network animated series, Codename: Kids Next Door.

Operation: V.I.D.E.O.G.A.M.E. is one of the only two video games to be solely based on Codename: Kids Next Door. The other, Operation: S.O.D.A., is a 2D platform game developed by Vicarious Visions for the Game Boy Advance.

== Plot ==
Numbuh One navigates the "Operation: T.U.T.O.R.I.A.L." level.

Sector V of the KND are playing a videogame, when the Toilenator appears, and ties up everyone except for Numbuh 1, who was too distracted by a new simulator helmet Numbuh 2 designed.

After Numbuh 1 beats him and frees the team, they inform him that the Toilenator was, in fact real, just as Numbuh 86 calls in to tell everyone the organization's greatest foes have escaped from the Arctic Base Prison, and orders Sector V to recapture the villains, and transfer them to the KND Moonbase afterwards.

First on the list is Gramma Stuffum, who has taken over the Sprinkle Puff Donut Shoppe. After he defeats her, Numbuh 1 gets a call from Numbuh 4 informing him that the KND Treehouse is covered in snot. Meanwhile, someone steals the engine core from the Chuck Wagon.

Returning to the treehouse, Numbuh 5 frees Numbuh 4. The Common Cold introduces his Snot Bomber plane. Numbuh 2 appears and defeats the Common Cold. Afterwards the same mysterious person appears in a jetpack and takes the power core from the Snot Bomber, causing it to plummet to the ground.

Numbuh 4 briefly leaves the treehouse, and in the meantime Count Spankulot breaks in and turns the other KND members into spank-happy vampires. Numbuh 4 returns and helps the rest of the team recover. Once the KND are back to normal, they decide to catch all the hamsters to repower the treehouse. Unfortunately their recent brawl has tired them out, aside from Numbuh 3, who thinks this mission is a game, so she's assigned to catch all the hamsters throughout the treehouse and restart the power core. Once Numbuh 3 powers up the treehouse, Numbuh 1 heads off to apprehend Count Spankulot personally, and heads out through the neighborhood freeing children, defeating the Count's minions, and ultimately confronts the villain at the School Clocktower.

After Count Spankulot's defeat, Numbuh 86 reports again, stating Sector V has spotted Stickybeard and his ship off the coast of South Dakota. Numbuh 2 fires the T.A.R.P.O.O.N. at Stickybeard's ship and Numbuh 5 slides along the T.A.R.P.O.O.N. rope to the ship. After Numbuh 5 defeats Stickybeard the mysterious person is revealed to be Numbuh 5's older sister Cree, who then proceeds to trap her under Stickybeard, take his candy cane peg leg, and leave.

Later that night, Numbuh 86 informs Sector V that Knightbrace is collecting fireflies. Numbuh 3 volunteers to browse the neighborhood for fireflies to stop Knightbrace. After finding and befriending one of the fireflies, she convinces it and any others to take her to the School Clocktower, where the rest are being held. The fireflies, grateful at being freed, help the KND find the location of Knightbrace's lair, from which Numbuh 1 defeats Knightbrace. Numbuh 4 finds the Toilenator has returned to try and flood the Treehouse with sewage (as he has tried to do at the beginning of the game). When Numbuh 4 finally wins, the Toilenator is sent to the C.O.O.L.B.U.S with the other villains.

The KND begin to take off after they have checked the villains. With everyone accounted for, they blast off to the moon in the C.O.O.L.B.U.S., only to be greeted by the DCFDTL's Mega-Mansion, which sends out a beam that merges the villains into a giant monster. In a desperate act, Sector V and Numbuh 86 activate the T.R.E.E.H.E.M.O.T.H. and defeat the monster. Later at the Moon Base, Sector V is given celebratory medals by Numbuh 86. Immediately after this, the adventure is revealed to just be a game Sector V was playing. Numbuh 1 reminds the team they need to be ready for anything. As he says this, the Toilenator arrives at the Treehouse just like in the beginning, suggesting the events in the game are going to repeat themselves in reality.

== Development and release ==
On February 11, 2004, Take-Two Licensing signed a first-look agreement with Cartoon Network Enterprises to develop and publish games based on Cartoon Network properties, with Codename: Kids Next Door being the first part of the deal.

== Reception ==
Reception

Aggregate scores
Aggregator	Score
GameRankings	NGC: 67.5% PS2: 53.1% XBOX: 66.1%
Metacritic	NGC: 58/100; PS2: 49/100; XBOX: 57/100

Review scores
Publication	Score
4Players	27%
IGN	4/10
Jeuxvideo.com	6/10
Nintendo World Report	6/10
Official Xbox Magazine (UK)	6.4/10
TeamXbox	5.4/10

Operation: V.I.D.E.O.G.A.M.E. received generally mixed ratings, with the GameCube and Xbox versions having overall better reception than the PS2 version. IGN rated it poorly, 4.0 out of 10, criticizing its bad camera angles and unreliable controls.
