= Jetfighter (series) =

- Jetfighter 2015 logo
- Genre: Combat flight simulation
- Developers: Velocity Development; Mission Studios; Interactive Vision; City Interactive
- Publishers: Velocity Development; Mission Studios; Interplay; TalonSoft; Global Star Software
- Artist: James H. Dargie

Jetfighter is a series of 3D combat flight simulation video games by Velocity Development in which the player flies a combat jet against enemy forces. The first was published in 1988. The 3D graphics were cutting-edge at the time of the game's release, and used real-world terrain. The games occupied an uncomfortable middle ground: too much flight simulator realism for action game players, but too simplistic for the hardcore sim fans. The series ended after the commercial failure of Jetfighter 2015. The later games support 3dfx Voodoo cards.

Jetfighter II was produced before the winner of the Advanced Tactical Fighter competition was announced. The programmers chose to emulate the YF-23 "Black Widow II" as the winning aircraft rather than the eventual winner, the YF-22 (which "entered service" in 2004 as the F-22 Raptor).

== Games ==
Game	Details
JetFighter: The Adventure Original release date(s): NA: 1988	Release years by system: 1988—MS-DOS
JetFighter: The Adventure Original release date(s): NA: 1988	Notes: Developed and published by Bob Dinnerman and Moses Ma under the name of Velocity Development, Jetfighter: the Adventure is the IBM version of the Amiga game F/A-18 Interceptor.; Daniel Hockman of Computer Gaming World gave the game a positive review, saying it "has the smoothest, fastest, most pleasing graphics I have yet seen on a flight simulator".
JetFighter II: Advanced Tactical Fighter Original release date(s): NA: 1990	Release years by system: 1990—MS-DOS
JetFighter II: Advanced Tactical Fighter Original release date(s): NA: 1990	Notes: Developed and published by Velocity Development; Computer Gaming World stated that the game was much more difficult than its predecessor, and concluded that for those who did not attend United States Naval Aviator flight training, "this will probably be the closest they will ever get to landing on a carrier in a high-performance jet ... [it] does a great job of simulating both the difficulty and exhiliration a pilot experiences once he finally places his jet on the carrier deck". A 1992 survey in the magazine of wargames with modern settings gave the game three and a half stars out of five.
JetFighter II: Advanced Mission Disk Original release date(s): NA: 1992	Release years by system: 1992—MS-DOS
JetFighter II: Advanced Mission Disk Original release date(s): NA: 1992	Notes: Developed and published by Velocity Development; It is an expansion to JetFighter II that adds 125 new missions and makes the Lockheed's F-22 Lightning Advanced Tactical Fighter flyable
Jetfighter III Original release date(s): NA: October 31, 1996; PAL: February 19, 1998	Release years by system: 1996—Windows
Jetfighter III Original release date(s): NA: October 31, 1996; PAL: February 19, 1998	Notes: Developed and published by Mission Studios; Repackaged in 1997 with Jetfighter III: Enhanced Campaign CD under the title, Jetfighter III Platinum; An updated edition, entitled Jetfighter III Classic, was published in September 1999 by Take 2 Interactive. The update includes extra such as 30 new missions
Jetfighter III: Enhanced Campaign CD Original release date(s): NA: April 30, 1997	Release years by system: 1997—Windows
Jetfighter III: Enhanced Campaign CD Original release date(s): NA: April 30, 1997	Notes: Developed and published by Mission Studios; It is an expansion of Jetfighter III that adds 74 new missions, two new flyable regions and the ability to fly the F-14 Tomcat; Repackaged in 1997 with JetFighter III under the title, Jetfighter III Platinum
Jetfighter: Full Burn Original release date(s): NA: July 2, 1998	Release years by system: 1998—Windows
Jetfighter: Full Burn Original release date(s): NA: July 2, 1998	Notes: Developed by Mission Studios and published by Interplay
Jetfighter IV: Fortress America Original release date(s): NA: November 8, 2000	Release years by system: 2000—Windows
Jetfighter IV: Fortress America Original release date(s): NA: November 8, 2000	Notes: Developed by Mission Studios and published by TalonSoft
Jetfighter Original release date(s): NA: 2001	Release years by system: 2001—Palm Organizer
Jetfighter Original release date(s): NA: 2001	Notes: Developed by Mission Studios and published by Global Star Software
Jetfighter V: Homeland Protector Original release date(s): NA: October 21, 2003	Release years by system: 2003—Windows
Jetfighter V: Homeland Protector Original release date(s): NA: October 21, 2003	Notes: Developed by Interactive Vision and published by Global Star Software
Jetfighter 2015 Original release date(s): NA: September 9, 2005	Release years by system: 2005—Windows
Jetfighter 2015 Original release date(s): NA: September 9, 2005	Notes: Developed by City Interactive and published by Global Star Software

== Reception ==
In the United States, Jetfighter IV's jewel case version sold 270,000 copies and earned $2.6 million by August 2006, after its release in January 2002. It was the country's 75th best-selling computer game between January 2000 and August 2006. Combined sales of all Jetfighter computer games released between January 2000 and August 2006 had reached 450,000 units in the United States by the latter date.

In a 1994 survey of wargames the magazine gave Jetfighter: The Adventure two-plus stars out of five ("still an entertaining product"). Jetfighter II received three stars ("contemporary graphics and play value").

== See also ==
- F-22 (series), a series of combat flight simulators by NovaLogic
