= Global Star =

Global Star can refer to:

- Globalstar, a satellite system
- Global Star Software, a video game company
