= Army Men: Major Malfunction =

2006 video game

- European cover art
- Developer: Team17
- Publisher: Global Star Software
- Series: Army Men
- Platforms: Xbox, PlayStation 2
- Release: NA: April 11, 2006 (Xbox); EU: August 4, 2006
- Genre: Third-person shooter
- Mode: Single-player

Army Men: Major Malfunction is a 2006 third-person shooter video game developed by Team17 and published by Global Star Software for the Xbox and PlayStation 2.

== Story ==
The main character is a soldier named Private Anderson. He is forced to fight his way through many enemy soldiers as he tries to defeat the main villain, Major Malfunction, and his henchman, Private Paintacular, who has taken over the house with his toy army.

== Reception ==
Reception

Aggregate score
Aggregator	Score
Metacritic	36/100

Review scores
Publication	Score
Computer and Video Games	1.3/10
GameSpot	3.1/10
IGN	3/10
TeamXbox	4.9/10

The game was widely panned by critics for its poor story, graphics, enemy artificial intelligence, and according to GameSpot its "horrible problems with aiming and camera control".
