= School Tycoon =

2004 video game

- Developer(s): Cat Daddy Games
- Publisher(s): Global Star Software
- Platform(s): Windows
- Release: January 15, 2004
- Genre(s): Business simulation game
- Mode(s): Single player

School Tycoon is a video game developed by Cat Daddy Games and published by Global Star Software in 2004. The game was designed to appeal to a younger audience as it is easier and less complicated than other business simulation games by removing the spreadsheets and statistics of game management.

== Gameplay ==
The game features an overhead view of a farm, city lot, or beach-side lot where a school is to be built. The player places buildings and paths to create the layout of the school. The objectives in the game increase in difficulty as the player progress; an easy objective might be to get a certain number of students into school while a more difficult objective would be to earn a certain amount of money within a time limit. There is also a sandbox game mode without specific objectives, giving the player the freedom to build any type of school they desire. The game view can zoom in to select individual students, or zoom out to look at the whole school. The game also has speed controls, to accelerate the pace of events, and has variable difficulty settings. Students in the school can learn ten different subjects. When starting off a school, the player can only afford small classrooms. As money is earned, better and larger classrooms can be built, helping the students to learn more. The player can build academic buildings, sports facilities, entertainment buildings, and an assortment of other structures such as statues, fountains, and food areas. It is also possible to hire teachers and coaches with a variety of different skills.
