= Star Monkey =

2001 video game

- Genre(s): Vertically scrolling shooter

Star Monkey is a 3D vertical scrolling shooter (with 2D gameplay), developed and published by Small Rockets in 2001 in a shareware form. The IGN rating is 7.7, saying that "Star Monkey's graphics are really rather impressive". Only one screen resolution of 800x600 is available. The game is set in space, with ability to upgrade the spaceship that slows it movement down. It has 6 levels and size of the game is around 10 megabytes.

Usual gameplay

After 9 months, on 6 September 2001, a gold edition was released, priced at $14.99.

Actually I am very proud of Star Monkey, a Small Rockets game I did. Much like I did with Josh Boggs on SPY mouse, I collaborated closely with a very talented engineer/co-designer called James Brown, on that one. Paul Boulden did the art and Richard Beddow wrote the music. It was a scrolling shoot-em-up that we made very quickly; from start to finish in around 8 months. I was given free reign [sic] by Jonathan Small, the head of the company, to make this game, and I was very proud of what we achieved. I felt it was a classic little shooter with some nice ideas and well balanced. To this day I still meet people who say they loved that game, which always surprises me because it wasn't very high profile.

— Adrian Moore

== Development ==
Game Design: Adrian Moore

Code, co-game designer: James Brown

Art: Paul Boulden, Christopher Izatt

Sound: Richard Beddow
