= Hummer Badlands =

2006 video game

- Developer(s): Eutechnyx
- Publisher(s): Global Star Software
- Platform(s): PlayStation 2, Xbox
- Release: NA: April 13, 2006; EU: July 15, 2006 (PS2)
- Genre(s): Racing
- Mode(s): Single-player, multiplayer

Hummer Badlands is a racing game developed by Eutechnyx and published by Global Star Software. It was released in North America for the PlayStation 2 and Xbox on April 13, 2006. The game involves off-road racing in a Hummer vehicle.

== Gameplay ==
There are seven different types of races.

== Reception ==
Reception

Aggregate score
Aggregator	Score	
Aggregator	PS2	Xbox
Metacritic	48/100	44/100

Review scores
Publication	Score	
Publication	PS2	Xbox
GameSpot	4.3/10	4.3/10
GameTrailers	4.4/10	4.4/10
IGN	4/10	4/10
Official Xbox Magazine (US)	N/A	3.8/10
TeamXbox	N/A	5/10

The game received "generally unfavorable reviews" on both platforms according to video game review aggregator Metacritic.
