= Medieval Conquest =

2004 video game

- Developer(s): Cat Daddy Games
- Publisher(s): Global Star Software
- Platform(s): Windows
- Release: NA: September 6, 2004
- Genre(s): Real-time strategy
- Mode(s): Single player

Medieval Conquest is a fantasy-themed real-time strategy personal computer game developed by Cat Daddy Games and published by Global Star Software for Windows in 2004. The game involves managing a kingdom by hiring units and building and upgrading structures.

== Overview ==
Medieval Conquest uses a 3D game engine. The game's story takes place over 12 missions spanning four maps. Players can hire three types of units: fighters, rangers, and mages. Units in Medieval Conquest are autonomous; the player indirectly influences their actions by assigning hunting territories and building structures that provide units with goods and services. Units gain experience points and improve in power over time as they level up and purchase better equipment. The game's sole resource is gold, earned by hunting monsters.

== Critical reception ==
Medieval Conquest received mixed reviews in the gaming media. Positive reviews praised its casual, light-hearted style, while critics singled out problems with unit AI and lack of compelling gameplay. A number of reviewers commented on its similarities to the 2000 real-time strategy game Majesty: The Fantasy Kingdom Sim.
