= Splat Magazine Renegade Paintball =

2005 video game

- Developer: Cat Daddy Games
- Publisher: Global Star Software
- Platforms: Microsoft Windows; Xbox
- Release: October 11, 2005
- Genre: First-person shooter

Splat Magazine Renegade Paintball is a paintball first-person shooter developed by Cat Daddy Games and published by Global Star Software.

== Publication history ==
It was released for Microsoft Windows and the Xbox video game console on October 11, 2005. Upon release, the game had numerous bugs, but Splat Magazine countered this by releasing an update that fixes most of the bugs.

== Reception ==
Reception

Aggregate scores
Aggregator	Score
GameRankings	PC: 49.22% XBOX: 49.54%
Metacritic	PC: 45/100; XBOX: 44/100

Review scores
Publication	Score
1Up.com	4/10
GameSpot	PC: 5.2/10; XBOX: 5/10
GameSpy	3/5
GameZone	PC: 5.3/10; XBOX: 5/10
IGN	PC: 4/10; XBOX: 4.2/10
X-Play	1/5

Splat Magazine Renegade Paintball received negative reviews from critics upon release. On Metacritic, the game holds scores of 45/100 for the PC version (based on 10 reviews) and 44/100 for the Xbox version (based on 14 reviews). On GameRankings, the game holds scores of 49.22% for the PC version (based on 9 reviews) and 49.54% for the Xbox version (based on 13 reviews).
