= Siege of Avalon =

2000 video game

- The cover of the Siege of Avalon Anthology.
- Developer: Digital Tome
- Publishers: Take 2, Globalstar, Blackstar
- Composer: Bjørn Lynne
- Platform: Microsoft Windows
- Release: July 19, 2000
- Genre: Action role-playing game
- Mode: Single player

Siege of Avalon (SoA) is a fantasy action role-playing PC game developed by Digital Tome and published on July 19, 2000. The game follows the player's attempts to lift the siege of Avalon, a castle in the fictional land of Eurale. SoA was initially released in six separate installments, before being released in a combined "Anthology" edition.

== History ==
Siege of Avalon was originally released as six individual "chapters." Each chapter expanded on the game's story, and included other new content. The game's first chapter was free for download, but the remaining five chapters had to be purchased. In 2001, Global Star Software released all six chapters of the game as "Siege of Avalon - Anthology". The anthology CD made minor changes to the game but was primarily identical to the downloadable chapters. The chapters are no longer available for download online.

There was initially a sequel to Siege of Avalon, titled Pillars of Avalon, planned, but Digital Tome went out of business prior to completing development of the second game.

In approximately 2003, Digital Tome granted permission for modification of the first chapter of Siege of Avalon. The intent was for the game to be developed to run on other platforms, have continued support available, and for the game to be distributed as open-source software under a Lesser General Public License (LGPL). As a result, the source code of the game was made available on Source Forge. In 2011 the project was moved to GitHub.

In 2014, Blackfly Studios announced that a digital re-release of Siege of Avalon was planned, but the developer went out of business prior to any release.

In April 2021, an updated version of the game was released on Steam and GOG by SNEG (publisher).

== Plot ==
Screenshot of the game showing the inventory and user interface (UI)

Siege of Avalon takes place in the fictional land of Eurale. Within Eurale are seven kingdoms: Nisos, Aratoy, Oriam, Fornax, Elythria, Cathea, and Taberland. The seven kingdoms united to build the citadel of Avalon as a central capital of the alliance. Within Eurale is a nomadic race called the Sha'ahoul. The Sha'ahoul, led by the leader Mithras, declared war on the seven kingdoms, ultimately besieging the city of Avalon.

The protagonist of the game is the playable character, which the user can customize and name. The protagonist arrives in Avalon by boat, several years into the siege. The protagonist's brother, Corvus, is already present within the castle when the player begins the game. The course of the gameplay follows the player through various quests related to maintaining Avalon's defenses and foiling plots to overtake the castle. The game climaxes in a battle between the player and Mithras, the leader of the Sha'ahoul, after the invading force breaks through the outer wall of Avalon.

== Reception ==
Reception

Review score
Publication	Score
GameSpy	80/100
