= Scaler (video game) =

2004 video game

- PAL region PS2 cover art
- Developer: Artificial Mind & Movement
- Publisher: Global Star Software
- Platforms: PlayStation 2, Xbox, GameCube
- Release: PlayStation 2, Xbox: NA: October 20, 2004; AU: October 29, 2004; EU: November 26, 2004; GameCube: NA: November 17, 2004
- Genre: Platform
- Mode: Single-player

Scaler, also known as Scaler: The Shapeshifting Chameleon, is a video game released in 2004 by Global Star Software for the GameCube, Xbox, and PlayStation 2 video game consoles. Scaler follows the story of a lizard-loving 12-year-old boy named Bobby "Scaler" Jenkins, who stumbles across an evil plot to dominate the world through use of mutated lizards.

== Gameplay ==
The main feature of Scaler is the ability for Bobby to transform into five different types of mutant lizards, each one having its own advantages depending on the environment. The different transformations are the Bakudan - a tiny, bomb-toting reptile, the Krock - a spiky, rolling armored sphere, the Doozum - a large flying dolphin lizard with sonar attacks, the Fruzard - a reptile with the ability to attack from a distance, and the Swoom - a penguin-like lizard adapted for swimming. As the player journeys to different areas of the world, they will occasionally be given a challenge to defeat the creature they wish to transform into, and upon completion of the challenge, they gain the ability to use their unique abilities. Only select areas in which Scaler journeys allow him to transform into these creatures, and only one of this five forms are usable in these locations. By feeding Reppy Klokkies, she secretes a gaseous ooze that gives Scaler upgrades.

In addition, Scaler faces a wide variety of enemies, which attack using various methods. Some enemies shoot projectiles, while others use direct combat or stealth.

Scaler has the ability to ride upon long tube-like pathways that charge his electrical bombs, rendering him ready for combat as soon as he departs from the tubes. These small, narrow tubes also carry him from place to place, allowing him to collect the eggs and get back to Reppy .

== Plot ==
Lizard-loving animal activist Bobby "Scaler" Jenkins discovers five extra-dimensional humanoid reptilian creatures - the leader, Looger, and his henchmen Jazz, Rhombus, Bootcamp, and Turbine - have disguised themselves as humans and intend to conquer the multiverse. Looger and his subordinates discover Scaler knows of their plot, and subsequently kidnap and torture him. During the torture, Bootcamp, frustrated by Scaler's taunts, accidentally opens an extra-dimensional portal, transforming Scaler into a blue reptilian humanoid and releasing him from his restraints. Scaler escapes through the portal, and Looger and his henchmen follow after him.

Scaler finds himself in a parallel universe where he encounters another reptilian man named Leon, who is amnesiac as a result of Looger's machinations and has the same name as his estranged father. Leon challenges Scaler to retrieve a lizard egg being incubated in a mysterious mechanism. When Scaler does so and returns the egg to Leon, he persuades Leon to let him help retrieve the rest of the eggs scattered in the multiverse. Leon grudgingly agrees, and reveals that Scaler can exchange Klokkies, balls of energy obtained by defeating enemies, to improve his abilities, and that Scaler can obtain the ability to transform into other creatures by defeating enough of that creature.

As Scaler and Leon travel the world, they discover that Looger controls a network of unstable portals, intending to create an army of mutant lizards to invade the multiverse. They must rescue all the eggs and stop Looger, or else the universes will be consumed in darkness. Meanwhile, due to spending time with Bobby, Leon begins to remember he is in fact Scaler's father. Years ago, he was a scientist who invented a "portal compass" that transported him to Looger's dimension, where he was imprisoned, tortured, and left amnesiac before eventually escaping. Leon is overjoyed to remember who he is and see his son again. However, Scaler struggles to accept the truth and accept his father, who he had been estranged from. In the end, however, he forgives him.

After defeating Jazz, Rhombus, Turbine, Bootcamp and some of the mutant monsters while rescuing the remaining lizard eggs, Scaler and Leon arrive at Looger's stronghold. After defeating him and reclaiming the portal compass, they rush to a last portal meant to bring them home. However, Leon, who went to save an egg that fell from a hole in Scaler's sack, remains behind while he crosses through it. Bobby arrives back in Looger's basement, only to realize his father did not make it in time as the portal closes.

In the secret ending, Scaler's defeat of Looger creates a new timeline where Leon was never captured, and seemingly has no knowledge of the reptilian multiverse, or the previous timeline. However, Bobby retains his chameleon tongue and the reflex to eat flies. Later, Leon proclaims that he misses Reppy, revealing that he still has memories of the multiverse. He looks at the portal compass in his possession and expresses a desire to return to the other dimension in the future.

== Reception ==
Reception

Aggregate score
| Aggregator | Score | | |
| Aggregator | GameCube | PS2 | Xbox |
|---|---|---|---|
| Metacritic | 69/100 | 70/100 | 69/100 |

Review scores
| Publication | Score | | |
| Publication | GameCube | PS2 | Xbox |
|---|---|---|---|
| 1Up.com | B+ | B+ | N/A |
| Game Informer | 4.5/10 | N/A | 4.5/10 |
| GameSpot | 6.6/10 | 6.6/10 | 6.6/10 |
| GameSpy | N/A | 4/5 | 4/5 |
| GameZone | N/A | N/A | 7.7/10 |
| IGN | 8/10 | 8/10 | 8/10 |
| Nintendo Power | 3.5/5 | N/A | N/A |
| Official U.S. PlayStation Magazine | N/A | 4/5 | N/A |
| Official Xbox Magazine (US) | N/A | N/A | 6.7/10 |
| TeamXbox | N/A | N/A | 7.6/10 |
| The Times | N/A | 3/5 | 3/5 |

Scaler received "average" reviews on all platforms according to the review aggregation website Metacritic. While receiving praise for its high production values and gameplay, some reviewers criticized it for having an unexciting plot and formulaic design.
