= Codename: Kids Next Door =

American animated spy fiction television series

- Also known as: Kids Next Door; KND
- Genre: Action-adventure; Comedy; Fantasy; Spy fiction
- Created by: Mr. Warburton
- Showrunner: Mr. Warburton
- Written by: Mr. Warburton; Mo Willems (seasons 1-4)
- Directed by: Mr. Warburton; Collette Sunderman (voice director)
- Voices of: Benjamin Diskin; Lauren Tom; Dee Bradley Baker; Cree Summer
- Composers: Steve Rucker; Thomas Chase Jones
- Country of origin: United States
- Original language: English
- No. of seasons: 6
- No. of episodes: 81 (140 segments) (Note: 78 regular episodes with 3 specials making 81 episodes in total) (list of episodes)

Production
- Executive producers: Mr. Warburton; Steve Oakes; David Starr; Richard Winkler; Jonathan Paley
- Producer: Bruce Knapp
- Running time: 22 minutes; 74 minutes ("Operation: Z.E.R.O."); 44 minutes ("Operation: I.N.T.E.R.V.I.E.W.S.")
- Production companies: Curious Pictures; Cartoon Network Studios (Note: Pilot, recording studio, and The Grim Adventures of the KND only. Kenny and the Chimp short produced entirely under Hanna-Barbera Cartoons.)

Original release
- Network: Cartoon Network
- Release: December 6, 2002 – January 21, 2008

Related
- What a Cartoon!

Codename: Kids Next Door (Note: Commonly abbreviated as Kids Next Door and KND or CKND) is an American animated spy fiction television series created by Mr. Warburton for Cartoon Network. It was produced by Curious Pictures with assistance from Cartoon Network Studios. The series follows the adventures of a diverse group of five children who operate from a high-tech treehouse, fighting against adult and teenage tyranny with advanced 2×4 technology. Using their code names (Numbuhs 1, 2, 3, 4, and 5), they are Sector V, part of a global organization called the Kids Next Door.

The series' pilot premiered on Cartoon Network in mid-2001 as part of The Big Pick II, a special broadcast event showcasing 11 pilots for different series. The winner of a viewers' poll by Cartoon Network would decide which pilot would be greenlit to be a full series. After winning the poll, the series premiered on December 6, 2002, and concluded on January 21, 2008, after six seasons and 81 episodes. Two television films were broadcast: Operation: Z.E.R.O., which aired in 2006, and Operation: I.N.T.E.R.V.I.E.W.S., which aired as the series finale in 2008. A special half-hour crossover episode with fellow Cartoon Network series, The Grim Adventures of Billy & Mandy, aired in 2007.

Spin-off media include two video games, Operation S.O.D.A. and Operation V.I.D.E.O.G.A.M.E., as well as a trading card game, comic books, and DVD releases. Codename: Kids Next Door has also appeared in DVD anthologies and compilation video games from Cartoon Network.

== Overview ==
From left to right: Numbuh 2, Numbuh 4, Numbuh 3, Numbuh 1, and Numbuh 5.

=== Synopsis ===
The series revolves around the adventures of a diverse group of five 10-year-old children (later retconned to be varying ages), using code names Numbuhs 1 through 5, who are the main home operatives of what is known as Sector V, which is part of a worldwide global espionage-style organization called the Kids Next Door. Their mission is to fight crimes against children (such as homework, flossing, doctor, baths, bedtime, teeth brushing, babysitters, sharing, doing chores, etc.), many of which are willingly committed by "evil" adults, senior citizens, teenagers, and occasionally other children. Numbuh 1 is a level-headed, no-nonsense British boy named Nigel Uno, leader of Sector V. Numbuh 2 is an overweight, nerdy American boy named Hogarth "Hoagie" Pennywhistle Gilligan, Jr. Numbuh 3 is a friendly, happy-go-lucky Japanese girl named Kuki Sanban. Numbuh 4 is a short-tempered, irrational Australian boy named Wallabee "Wally" Beetles. Numbuh 5 is an intelligent, relaxed, French-born African-American girl who speaks in illeism named Abigail "Abby" Lincoln.

Following a period of training, every member of the Kids Next Door chooses a number or alphanumeric code (deliberately pronounced and spelled as "Numbuh") and is sent to a "sector" that acts as their home base. The sector headquarters, like some of the organization's bases and facilities, are high-tech tree houses, with both treehouse and the tree it is in being of ludicrous proportions, and often suited to their environment. This includes a base constructed beneath the Arctic ice shelf, and a base built into a large pine tree. The main headquarters of the Kids Next Door is a treehouse Moon Base. The Kids Next Door follow their oath of protecting other kids as well as fighting against adult and teenage tyranny and battling adulthood until the age of 13 when they are "decommissioned", a process of wiping their memories of all and any past KND activity and warping their minds. Such a practice has inevitably led to the creation of many KND villains who escaped decommissioning, including Numbuh 5's older sister Cree, formerly known as Numbuh 11 and former leader of Sector V; and Chad, formerly known as Numbuh 274 and supreme commander of the Kids Next Door.

It is later revealed that the decommissioning rules can be relaxed for agents who demonstrate exceptional skill and loyalty. These agents are offered the chance to join the Teens Next Door, an organization whose members undergo a faked memory wipe and then go undercover to infiltrate the teenagers' ranks so they can pass information back to the KND. They face mandatory decommissioning upon reaching the age of 20. Decommissioning has also proved reversible via a "re-commissioning" module used four times in the series (once in "Operation: E.N.D." and three times in "Operation: Z.E.R.O.").

KND agents utilize a vast array of mechanical, electronic gadgets, weapons, and machinery, collectively referred to as 2×4 (two-by-four) technology. The KND's 2×4 technology was originally conceived as being constructed from an assortment of objects, mostly common household ones. However, as the series progressed, the kind of objects their technology would be constructed from became bigger, consisting of things such as large vehicles and small buildings. Not only that, but the complexity of their technology, such as their defensive weaponry and means of transportation, advanced to such absurd levels as to be considered science fiction, despite all of it still being constructed from nothing but an assortment of objects.

=== Storylines ===
The episodes are titularly presented as the missions of the members of Sector V in the Kids Next Door, denoted as "Operation:" followed by a backronym that can give viewers clues as to what each mission is about. Most episodes are divided into two parts, each with a different mission, while some episodes consist of two directly linked parts with one mission. Usually, the episodes have very little continuity with each other, although occasionally an episode will have a reference to at least one earlier episode and/or lead to consequences in later ones. Season Five's "Operation: O.U.T.B.R.E.A.K." is a direct continuation of the episode "Operation: V.I.R.U.S.", and Season Six's "Operation: R.E.C.E.S.S." and "Operation: H.A.M.S.T.E.R.", occur simultaneously, the latter showing what sort of thing transpires while the team is away; while another pair of Season Six episodes "Operation: S.C.I.E.N.C.E." leads into "Operation: A.M.I.S.H.".

Stories in the earlier episodes were often about typical childhood problems, but magnified and exaggerated. As the series progressed, a more complex and continuous storyline developed. The final season revolved around the mysterious Splinter Cell within the KND itself observing Numbuh One for an unknown assignment, which was concluded in the series finale "Operation: I.N.T.E.R.V.I.E.W.S.".

== Production ==
Warburton created a pilot episode, titled "Diseasy Does It", for another planned show, Kenny and the Chimp, which was to be produced by Hanna-Barbera. Among the planned recurring characters for Kenny and the Chimp was a group of rebellious children known as "Those Kids Next Door", who carried out their mischief from a house next to Kenny's home, and frequently caused trouble for him. The plot-line was then changed to focus on the group of kids alone, and later, the kids battling adulthood. The show began development under the name The Kids Next Door, which was later changed to the current title after another network began developing a show called Pigs Next Door. In 2001, the show's pilot episode, "No P in the OOL", which was produced at Cartoon Network Studios, won a Cartoon Network viewer's poll, and as a result, Codename: Kids Next Door was greenlit to become a series, while Kenny and the Chimp was not greenlit by the channel. The character Professor XXXL, who appeared in "Diseasy Does It", became a recurring character in Codename: Kids Next Door after Kenny and the Chimp was not picked up for a series, while Kenny and Chimpy did make a cameo in "No P in the OOL".

Codename: Kids Next Door was the most popular TV series produced at Curious Pictures, who previously did the work on Sheep in the Big City at Cartoon Network.

== Characters ==
=== Main characters ===
- Numbuh 1/Nigel Uno (voiced by Benjamin Diskin) - The leader and head operative of Sector V as well as the only child of Monty Uno.
- Numbuh 2/Hogarth Pennywhistle "Hoagie" Gilligan, Jr. (voiced by Benjamin Diskin) - The best friend of Numbuh 1, the joke-cracking engineer and 2x4 Technology Officer of Sector V as well as the older brother of Tommy Gilligan.
- Numbuh 3/Kuki Sanban (voiced by Lauren Tom) - The happy-go-lucky tactician and medic of Sector V as well as the older sister of Mushi Sanban.
- Numbuh 4/Wallabee "Wally" Beetles (voiced by Dee Bradley Baker) - The brash combatant of Sector V as well as the older brother of Joey Beetles.
- Numbuh 5/Abigail "Abby" Lincoln (voiced by Cree Summer) - The intelligent, relaxed second-in-command/spy of Sector V and the younger sister of Cree Lincoln. Numbuh 5 speaks in an illeism.

=== KND Organization ===
- Numbuh 6/Bradley (vocal effects provided by Dee Bradley Baker) - A skunk who became an honorary member of Sector V after Hoagie and Kuki saved him in the streets. In "Operation: H.O.S.P.I.T.A.L.", Bradley is converted into a cyborg to save his life after he is hit by a car.
- Numbuh 9/Maurice (voiced by Khary Payton) - A former member of Sector V whose decommissioning was faked when he turned 13 so he could join the Teens Next Door, a special team tasked with infiltrating the ranks of teens and adults in order to pass information on their plans back to the KND.
- Numbuh 13 (voiced by Billy West) - The Klutz of the KND. While he means well, he is ignorant to the fact that he is incredibly clumsy, klutzy, and moronic. Like the KND's Toiletnator, every sector dreads having to work with him, even his own. The Sector Leader of N, Numbuh 14/Mary-Lou Sara-Jane Jones (voiced by Lauren Tom), has the literal job of being his damage control, which she resents very much.
- Numbuh 60/Patton Drilovsky (voiced by Matt Levin) - A high-ranking operative of the Kids Next Door Arctic Base.
- Numbuh 65.3/Herbie (voiced by Dee Bradley Baker) - The stuffy and nerdy Head Communications Officer of Moonbase.
- Numbuh 83/Sonia (voiced by Janice Kawaye) - The Soda, Snacks, and Treats officer of Sector W, she has an irrational fear of the dark and will go into a blind rage when she is forced towards it.
- Numbuh 84/Lee (voiced by Janice Kawaye) - The tactical Yo-yo Specialist of Sector W.
- Numbuh 86/Fanny Fulbright (voiced by Jennifer Hale) - The Head of Decommissioning and Global Tactical Officer of the KND Organization. She is a bossy girl and speaks with an Irish accent.
- Numbuh 92 and Numbuh 93 (voiced by Benjamin Diskin and Tara Strong) - Two KND operatives who reside on the Kids Next Door Moonbase. Their roles are effectively replaced with Numbuh 44/Pete and Peter Doblemitz (voiced by Lauren Tom), twin operatives who also work as infantry.
- Numbuh 101/Matt (voiced by Ogie Banks) - The Head of the KND Seriously Cool Museum of Artifacts and Stuff. He is a fan of Sector V and an avid KND history enthusiast, believing in Sector Z and Numbuh 0 even when others thought that they were just myths.
- Numbuh 362/Rachel McKenzie (voiced by Rachael MacFarlane) - The Supreme Leader of the KND Organization who succeeds Chad Dixon.
- Numbuh 363/Harvey McKenzie (voiced by Jennifer Hale) - The sector leader of Sector W and Numbuh 362's younger brother. He is rivaling with Sector V in the series finale, who do not like him due to his cockiness and dislike of being touched by others. He was decommissioned months later by Numbuh 5 because she got sick of him not wanting to be touched.
- Numbuh 74.239 and Numbuh Infinity (voiced by Dave Wittenberg and Phil LaMarr respectively) - Two KND operatives who worked for the Splinter Cell, a shadowy faction of the Kids Next Door. They have manipulated events to sign Nigel to the Galactic KND.

=== Villains ===
- Father / Benedict Wigglestein-Uno (voiced by Maurice LaMarche when suited, Jeff Bennett when unsuited) - The arch-nemesis of the KND, the main antagonist of the series, and the "adoptive" father of the Delightful Children From Down the Lane. He is also Nigel's paternal uncle and Monty's brother. Father wears a silhouetted suit and possesses pyrokinesis. In "Operation: Z.E.R.O.", it is revealed that Father kidnapped the members of Sector Z and brainwashed them to become the Delightful Children.
- The Delightful Children From Down the Lane (voiced by Benjamin Diskin, Dee Bradley Baker, and Cree Summer in unison, and by Tom Kenny, Rachael MacFarlane, Jason Harris, Dee Bradley Baker, and Cree Summer individually as Sector Z (Note: In "Operation U.N.D.E.R.C.O.V.E.R.", the one with the football helmet (Lenny) briefly separates from the others and is individually voiced by Dee Bradley Baker.)) - Five kids who serve Father. In "Operation: Z.E.R.O.", they are revealed to be the former members of the missing Sector Z; Bruce, Alessandra, David, Lenny, and Constance, who were permanently brainwashed into serving Father.
  - Jenkins (voiced by Dee Bradley Baker) - The butler of the Delightful Children From Down the Lane.
- The Teen Ninjas - A group of teenagers in Battle Ready Armor who often work for Father or the Delightful Children From Down the Lane.
  - The Steve (voiced by Jeff Bennett) - The leader of the Teen Ninjas.
  - Cree Lincoln (voiced by Cree Summer) - Numbuh 5's older sister, field leader of the Teen Ninjas, and an apprentice to Father. She was originally KND operative Numbuh 11. While a dangerous foe, Cree does care about her sister and wished that Numbuh 5 joined the teens just like her.
  - Chad Dickson (voiced by Jason Harris) - Formerly Numbuh 274, Chad was the supreme leader of the Kids Next Door until it was revealed in "Operation: E.N.D." that he had hidden his thirteenth birthday to the KND and arranged Sector V's decommissioning. In "Operation: T.R.E.A.T.Y.", it is revealed that he is a TND operative working for the Splinter Cell.
- Mr. Boss (voiced by Jeff Bennett) - A corporate businessman, the CEO of Werk Co., and the de facto second-in-command of the KND's enemies. In "Operation: D.A.D.D.Y.", it is revealed that he is Numbuh 86's father.
- Mr. John Wink and Mr. Timothy Fibb (voiced by Tom Kenny and Dee Bradley Baker respectively) - A pair of villains who use robotic chairs to fight. Mr. Wink has bison horns and Mr. Fibb has walrus tusks. In "Operation C.O.W.G.I.R.L.", is it revealed that Wink and Fibb were members of Cowboys Kids Club and became villains after Lasso Lass went the prom with Texas Tommy instead of Timothy. They are a parody of Mr. Wint and Mr. Kidd and address each other in the same manner.
- Laura Limpin / The Big Badolescent (voiced by Grey DeLisle in normal form, Dee Bradley Baker in teen form) - A little girl who, while normally is innocent and thus does not have the personality of a villain, has a "condition" that turns her into a hulking teenage monster when she gets angry. She is a parody of Hulk.
- The Toiletnator / Lou Pottingsworth III (voiced by Dee Bradley Baker) - A toilet-themed villain who is considered the lamest villain by the KND and by other villains. In a comic spin-off, it is revealed that he is Wally's long-lost uncle.
- Stickybeard (voiced by Mark Hamill) - The candy-loving pirate captain of the Candy Pirates and a rival of Numbuh 5's due to their mutual obsession with sugar. He uses a pirate ship called the Sweet Revenge as his mode of transportation on air, land, and sea.
  - Chewy and Gooey (voiced by Dee Bradley Baker and Daran Norris) - Two cabin boys of the Candy Pirates who are often seen with Stickybeard. They respectively wear red and blue bandanas.
  - Dumb John Silver (voiced by Daran Norris) - An unintelligent helmsman working on the Sweet Revenge.
- Knightbrace / Mr. Jelly (voiced by Tom Kenny) - An oral health-themed vigilante who performs painful and unnecessary dental and orthodontic procedures on the children he ambushes. As a civilian, Jelly is the former owner of a candy shop the KND frequently visit. Jelly intended to be a dentist since he was a child, but was expelled from dental school for attempting to put braces on babies. He was forced to work in his family's candy store and later became Knightbrace due to being angered at candy harming children's teeth.
- The Common Cold (voiced by Tom Kenny) - A sickness-based villain who uses his own snot to render all KND operatives sick so they'll be too weak on stopping other adults' plans.
- The Parent Teacher Organization of Eradicating Youngsters (PTOOEY) - A group of parents and teachers who want to rule the world with no involvement from children.
  - Peter Principal (voiced by Tom Kenny) - A principal with flight and the leader of PTOOEY.
  - Mad Dad (voiced by Jeff Bennett) - An abusive father in a tank top, tie, boxing gloves, boxers, and slippers who would take out his anger of bad grades on others.
  - Terrible Tutor (voiced by Dee Bradley Baker) - A tutor who can fly and shoot textbooks out of the sleeves of his graduate robe.
  - Midwestern Mom (voiced by Grey DeLisle) - A mother who is an expert wrestler.
  - Heli-Teacher (voiced by Cree Summer) - An old teacher who can fly around on a chair that has a helicopter propeller on it.
- Gramma Stuffum (voiced by Grey DeLisle) - An old lady obsessed with force-feeding disgusting food to children to make them unable to move so that they cannot bother adults.
  - Food Army (variously voiced by Dee Bradley Baker, Grey DeLisle, Benjamin Diskin, and Cree Summer) - The food creations of Gramma Stuffum.
    - Liver (voiced by Tom Kenny) - An anthropomorphic liver creation of Gramma Stuffum who acts as the field leader for the food army.
    - Onions - Two anthropomorphic onion creations of Gramma Stuffum who are often seen with the Liver.
- Count Spankulot (voiced by Daran Norris) - A vampire vigilante who spanks naughty children. Like the Toiletnator, he wants to join a group but his spank addiction always gets him rejected. In "Operation: L.O.C.K.D.O.W.N.", he demonstrated the ability to turn people into spank-happy vampires when his gloves are off.
- The Proper Patrol - A militaristic duo who use jetpacks as their mode of transportation. They often goes around trying to dress up children in proper clothing.
  - Major Mrs. Manners (voiced by Jennifer Hale) - A member of the Proper Patrol.
  - Sergeant Sensible (voiced by Daran Norris) - A member of the Proper Patrol.
- Crazy Old Cat Lady (voiced by Grey DeLisle) - An old cat lady with cat-like features who lives with thousands of black and white cats.
- Professor XXXL (voiced by Frank Welker) - A scientist who wants to create the most perfect snow cone that has ever been made. Every time he appears, he has different animalistic parts in his body.
- Professor Bob (voiced by Dee Bradley Baker) - A mad scientist who wants to end snow days.
- Chester (voiced by Tom Kenny, Jess Harnell when posing as Dr. Phinease Sharp) - A greedy man who wants to make money at the expense of children like enslaving children at a camp to make wallets when posing as a camp counselor, selling "kids meals" to families of driving sharks when operating the fast food restaurant Burger Frenzy as a chef, working as a mad scientist when trapping people in "Happy Headbands", and turning children into moose through a supposed "Moosebumps" shot in order to make Moosicles.
  - Nurse Jumbo (voiced by Candi Milo) - A nurse who assisted Chester in his "Moosicles" plot.
- Mr. Mogul (voiced by Rob Paulsen in "Operation: R.A.I.N.B.O.W.S.", Dee Bradley Baker in "Operation M.O.V.I.E.") - The CEO of Rainbow Monkeys Inc.
  - Simon (voiced by Tom Kane) - The personal assistant of Mr. Mogul.
- Mega Mom and Destructo Dad / Mrs. and Mr. Dickson (voiced by Grey DeLisle and Jeff Bennett) - Numbuh 274's parents who wear full masks of their heads and intended their son to be the best by petrifying the other KND operatives.
- Mr. Fizz (voiced by Jeff Bennett) - A businessman who is the head of the Soda Control Board, who "legalize" the age of when children should not drink root beer. He cannot stand the sound of children and often drinks soda to soothe his nerves.
  - Lieutenant Seltzer (voiced by Greg Cipes) - A teenage intern and field commander of the Soda Control Board.
- Big Brother (voiced by John DiMaggio in "Operation: M.I.N.I.G.O.L.F.", Daran Norris in "Operation: M.O.V.I.E.") - A giant-size teenager.
- The Great Puttinski / Rupert Puttkin (voiced by Rob Paulsen) - An arrogant and rude miniature golf champion who takes the sport very seriously.
- Senior Citizen Squad - A group of senior citizens residing at Sure Would Forest Retirement Home. They often make use of an anti-aging cream that temporarily turns them into teenagers. The Senior Citizen Squad can also use their elderly equipment to form one giant robot called the "Senior Citizen".
  - Lydia Gilligan (voiced by Candi Milo) - Hoagie's grandmother and leader of the Senior Citizen Squad. In her teenage form, she uses her walking stick as a melee weapon.
  - Sheldon (voiced by Tom Kenny) - A member of the Senior Citizen Squad. In his teenage form, Sheldon's walker acts as wings.
  - Maurice (voiced by Dee Bradley Baker) - A member of the Senior Citizen Squad. In his teenage form, Maurice uses his wheelchair wheels as weapons.
- Ice Cream Men (variously voiced by Dee Bradley Baker, Tom Kenny, Daran Norris, and Kevin Michael Richardson) - The Ice Cream Men are ice cream vendors who operate Ice Cream Trucks and only serve ice cream to adults. They would often work for the Delightful Children from Down the Lane or Mr. Boss.
  - Elite Ice Cream Men (variously voiced by Jess Harnell, Maurice LaMarche, Matt Levin, Daran Norris, and Khary Payton) - A version of the Ice Cream Men who wear ice cream cone-themed armor and work for Father.
    - Chef Pierre (voiced by Jess Harnell) - An Elite Ice Cream Man and cake chef who was once commissioned by Father to build a giant ice cream cake.
- Mrs. Goodwall (voiced by Candi Milo) - A zoologist with a lion-like tail.
- Cheese Shogun Roquefort (voiced by Kevin Michael Richardson in "Operation: T.H.E.-S.H.O.G.U.N.", Fred Tatasciore in "Operation: I.N.T.E.R.V.I.E.W.S.") - The shogun of the Cheese Empire.
  - Cheese Ninjas (voiced by Daran Norris and Kevin Michael Richardson) - A group of ninjas who are the minions of Cheese Shogun Roquefort.
    - Cheese Ninja Leader (voiced by Brian Tochi) - The leader of the Cheese Ninjas. He has triangle cheese slices on parts of his head.
- King Sandy (voiced by James Arnold Taylor) - An average little kid who portrays himself as a tyrannical king and hates being told that he is only pretending.
  - The Knights of the Round Towel (voiced by Jeff Bennett and James Arnold Taylor) - The teenage cousins of King Sandy who are loyal to him.
- Cuppa Joe (voiced by Tom Kenny) - The proprietor of a coffee rig that gets high on coffee.
  - Coffee Workers (voiced by Jason Harris and Tom Kenny) - Coffee rig workers who work for Cuppa Joe.
  - Derrick - A giant robot that makes up most of the coffee rig.
- Mr. Washer (voiced by Rob Paulsen) - A hobby store proprietor who once paired Hoagie and The Kid against each other.
- The Interesting Twins From Beneath The Mountain - Two Japanese twins consisting of an unnamed boy (voiced by Tom Kenny) and an unnamed girl (voiced by Tara Strong) who worked for Father, with facepaint similar to the Yin and Yang symbol. Although the two are masters of disguise and espionage, they tend to suffer many misfortunes and setbacks.
- The Six-Gum Gang - A gang of child robbers who worked for the Delightful Children From Down the Lane to steal other children's homework and pass it off as their own.
  - Runt (voiced by Jennifer Hale) - A member of the Six-Gum Gang whose hat goes over his eyes.
  - Lunk (voiced by Dee Bradley Baker) - A member of the Six-Gum Gang.
  - Goof (voiced by Tom Kenny) - A member of the Six-Gum Gang.
  - Wilbur (voiced by Benjamin Diskin) - A member of the Six-Gum Gang.
  - Dixie (voiced by Jennifer Hale) - A member of the Six-Gum Gang.
- Nurse Claiborne (voiced by Jennifer Hale) - A school nurse and opportunitist.
- Henrietta "Heinrich" Von Marzipan (voiced by Dee Bradley Baker while cursed, Candi Milo while uncursed), Numbuh 5's arch-rival, who travels the world in search of rare candy and will often go to villainous extremes to get it. She hates Numbuh 5 for an unknown past event in Guatemala, eventually explained in "Operation: C.A.R.A.M.E.L." It is revealed that she is actually female and was cursed into a male form. Heinrich and Abigail reconcile after her curse is lifted.
  - Candy Bandits (voiced by Rob Paulsen and Cree Summer) - A group of mercenaries who work for Heinrich.
- James Nixon McGarfield (voiced by Tom Kenny) - McGarfield was the Fourth Grade President-for-life of Gallagher Elementary until it was revealed that he allied with Father. His name is a reference to American presidents who were involved in scandals and disasters: James Buchanan, Richard Nixon, William McKinley, and James A. Garfield.
  - Anna Worthington (voiced by Anndi McAfee) - McGarfield's personal assistant and the niece of the Common Cold.
  - Honor Roll Nerds (voiced by Benjamin Diskin and Tom Kenny) - The textbook-wearing minions of McGarfield. They are parodies of the Droidekas from the Star Wars franchise.
- Ernest (voiced by Dave Wittenberg) - Ernest is the leader of the bullies who commissions underground sports involving kids to misbehave. His name is a reference to Ernest Hemingway, who was a fan of Spanish Bullfighting.
- Soccer Mom (voiced by Grey DeLisle) - An abusive motherly soccer coach. Her name is a spoof of the "soccer mom" archetype.
- Robin Food (voiced by Rob Paulsen) - A cafeteria worker at Sure Would Forest Retirement Home who steals food from the home to use for himself, reasoning that the residents are unable to eat the food themselves. He is a parody of Robin Hood.
  - Little Juan (voiced by Roger Rose) - A cafeteria worker at Sure Would Forest Retirement Home who is Robin Food's right-hand man. He is a parody of Little John.
  - The Hungry Men (variously voiced by Dee Bradley Baker and Tom Kenny) - The minions of Robin Food. They are a parody of the Merry Men.
- Bag-Headed Cashier (voiced by Dee Bradley Baker) - A cashier in a paper grocery bag mask who works at the Supervillains Supermarket & Deli.
- Dodgeball Wizard (voiced by Dave Wittenberg) - A wizard who is out to prove that adults that can play dodgeball too.
- Teen Tornado - A teenage villain who can spin around in a tornado.
- Potty Mouth (voiced by Maurice LaMarche) - A toilet-headed villain.
- Grandfather (voiced by Neil Ross) - Monty and Benedict's father who is the main antagonist in "Operation: Z.E.R.O.". His main goal was to turn all children and adults into obedient elderly zombies to reclaim domination across the world. Grandfather is defeated by the recommissioned Numbuh 0, who erases both of their memories using the Decommissioning Chamber.

=== Other characters ===
- Lizzie Devine (voiced by Grey DeLisle) - Nigel's girlfriend and then later ex-girlfriend; they broke up at the end of the season 6 episode, "Operation: G.I.R.L.F.R.I.E.N.D.". While they were together, she was extremely possessive of him and was always looking to spend as much time with him as possible, which inconveniences him if he was in the middle of KND business.
- Numbuh 0/Montgomery "Monty" Uno (voiced by Frank Welker as an adult, Dave Wittenberg as a child) - Nigel's father. He is later revealed to have started the Seventh Age of the KND after defeating Grandfather as Numbuh 0.
- Mrs. Uno (voiced by Jennifer Hale) - Numbuh 1's mother and Father's sister-in-law. In "Operation: I.N.T.E.R.V.I.E.W.S.", it is revealed that she was originally a KND operative Numbuh 999, and was the first female operative of the Seventh Age.
- Betty Gilligan (voiced by Candi Milo) - Numbuh 2's mother.
- Thomas "Tommy" Gilligan (voiced by Dee Bradley Baker) - Hoagie's baby brother who constantly wanted to join Sector V on their missions, much to their annoyance. In "Operation: G.R.A.D.U.A.T.E.S.", he temporarily becomes a KND operative "Numbuh T" until he deletes himself from the code module in order to stop one of Father's plans, and becomes a vigilante known as "The Tommy".
- Kani Sanban (voiced by Keone Young) - Kuki's father. While high strung and moody, he does love his children. His name means "crab" in Japanese, fitting his crabby personality.
- Genki Sanban (voiced by Lauren Tom) - Kuki's mother. She is a successful businesswoman and is the boss of Betty Gilligan. While she never played with toys as a girl, she does let her daughters have toys as to give them a happy childhood unlike her.
- Mushi Sanban (voiced by Tara Strong), Numbuh 3's little sister. In season 4, she becomes a villain after "murdering" her sister's new Rainbow Monkey out of jealousy. Mushi kidnaps Count Spankulot to create Spankenstine as revenge towards Numbuh 2.
- Sydney Beetles (voiced by Jeff Bennett) - Wally's father.
- Mrs. Beetles (voiced by Jennifer Hale) - Wally's mother.
- Joey Beetles (vocal effects provided by Dee Bradley Baker) - Wally's baby brother. He is surprisingly powerful and witty for being only a baby, defeating multiple villains.
- Dr. Lincoln (voiced by Kevin Michael Richardson) - Abigail's father. He used to work as a clown until his co-worker messed up his joke, ruining their careers.
- Mrs. Lincoln (voiced by Cree Summer) - Numbuh 5's mother.

== Episodes ==
Season	Segments	Episodes	Originally released	
Season	Segments	Episodes	First released	Last released
Pilots	N/A	2	November 6, 1998	July 20, 2001
1	24	13	December 6, 2002	March 7, 2003
2	25	13	October 3, 2003	June 4, 2004
3	23	13	June 11, 2004	November 12, 2004
4	22	13	November 19, 2004	July 22, 2005
5	22	13	September 25, 2005	August 24, 2006
6	21	13	August 2, 2006	November 23, 2007
Specials	N/A	3	August 11, 2006	January 21, 2008

There are six seasons, each with 13 episodes (two half-length episodes counting as one), adding up to 78 episodes altogether. There have been two TV movies, the first taking place between the second and third episodes of season 6 (Operation: Z.E.R.O.), and the second at the end of season 6 (Operation: I.N.T.E.R.V.I.E.W.S.), which serves as the series finale.

== Reception ==
=== Awards and nominations ===
In 2005, the series won the Best Television Series for Children Award at the Ottawa International Animation Festival for "Operation: A.R.C.H.I.V.E.", which was written by Mr. Warburton and Mo Willems and storyboarded by Guy Moore and Quack Leard. The following year, "Operation: L.I.C.O.R.I.C.E." won the Festival's Collideascope Award for Television Animation for Children.

It was also nominated for the Pulcinella award at the 2007 Cartoons on the Bay festival, in the category of action-adventure TV series.

== Other media ==
=== Home media ===
Two DVDs totaling sixteen episodes were released by Warner Home Video. Four episodes were also released on the Game Boy Advance Video cartridge Codename: Kids Next Door, Volume 1 in July 2004. The entire series is available on digital purchase on Amazon Prime and Apple TV+. On May 30, 2019, the entire series, except for the "Operation: Z.E.R.O." TV movie, was added to the Boomerang streaming service and its VRV channel. The series, including "Operation: Z.E.R.O.", was available on the Max streaming service until it was removed.

Codename: Kids Next Door home media releases
Season	Title	Release date		
Season	Title	Region 1	Region 2	Region 4
1	Scooby-Doo and the Toon Tour of Mysteries	June 2004		
1	Sooper Hugest Missions: File One	October 26, 2004	May 15, 2006	February 13, 2008
1	Sooper Hugest Missions: File One	March 12, 2013 (Hall of Fame #2)		
1	Sooper Hugest Missions: File Two	August 23, 2005		
1	Sooper Hugest Missions: File Two	June 23, 2015 (Hall of Fame #3)		
1	Christmas Rocks	October 4, 2005		
2	Sooper Hugest Missions: File Two	August 23, 2005		
2	Sooper Hugest Missions: File Two	June 23, 2015 (Hall of Fame #3)		
3	Grossest Halloween Ever	August 9, 2005		
3	Sweet Sweet Fear	September 12, 2006		
5	Christmas #3	October 3, 2006		

=== In other series or works ===
The show made several appearances in The Grim Adventures of Billy & Mandy; though often just cameo appearances, the two series had a proper crossover in the television special The Grim Adventures of the KND. Other mediums that have referenced the series include the television shows MAD, Villainous, OK K.O.! Let's Be Heroes, Craig of the Creek, and Jellystone!, the film Sideways, and the New Boyz song "Tough Kids".

=== Publications ===
Stories featuring the Kids Next Door have been featured in the comic series Cartoon Cartoons, Cartoon Network Block Party, and Cartoon Network Action Pack from DC Comics. The characters are also featured in the books 2x4 Technology Handbook and Sooper Secrets and Boomerang Bloopers, both by Benjamin Alison Wilgus. The characters appeared in a one-shot tie-in for Cartoon Network and IDW's Super Secret Crisis War crossover comic in 2014.

=== Trading cards ===
A trading card game based on the series was launched by Wizards of the Coast in July 2005.

=== Video games ===
Two video games were released for the series: Operation: S.O.D.A. in 2004 for the Game Boy Advance and Operation: V.I.D.E.O.G.A.M.E. in 2005 for PlayStation 2, Xbox, and GameCube. Several browser games were also released on the Cartoon Network website. The MMORPG style game Operation: B.E.S.T. was playable for a brief time in 2005, but was shut down shortly thereafter.

In Cartoon Network Universe: FusionFall, Numbuhs One through Five, and villains Father, Toiletnator, and Stickybeard appear as non-playable characters. KNDefense armor and 2x4 Tech weapons are available for players, Sector V's treehouse can be explored, and KND S.C.A.M.P.E.R.s can be used for transport. In Cartoon Network: Punch Time Explosion, Father and Numbuh 1 are playable, Sector V Treehouse and the C.O.O.L.-B.U.S. are arenas, and Numbuh 2 and Stickybeard are assisted characters. In the console versions, Toiletnator is a playable character, Numbuh 4 is an assist character, and KND Moonbase is an arena.

== Future ==
On January 31, 2008, during a Q&A session on LiveJournal, when Tom Warburton was asked if "Operation: I.N.T.E.R.V.I.E.W.S." was in fact the true finale of Codename: KND, he said that it was not necessarily meant to be the finale, stating that a revival could be made in the future.

Warburton had pitched a Galactic Kids Next Door sequel several times to Cartoon Network executives, and at one point he considered making a TV movie as a pilot for the potential series. As there was no response, Warburton eventually decided to create a pitch that would be distributed over the internet pseudonymously to try and get the series approved with help from fans. Warburton wrote the script and collaborated with others who had worked on the series to produce an animatic-style pitch. On March 19, 2015, the animatic was released, entitled Galactic Kids Next Door. On April 1, 2015, a fan-made petition was started on Change.org to have Galactic Kids Next Door be picked up for a full series, and it was signed by Warburton himself as well as Dee Bradley Baker. Warburton later noted that the executives at Cartoon Network had noticed the response but were not interested in a follow-up to KND, though he hopes to get the sequel approved in the future.

In 2025, Warburton, along with the voice actors for the main characters, appeared at Nostalgia Con in Houston, Texas to conduct a table read of a "pitch script" based on the Galactic Kids Next Door project. Warburton followed up by saying: "We are always trying to get Warner Bros. interested and just say like, 'Hey, look at this great thing we've got. We have got a lot of people really interested in it.' So, we wrote a little teaser script."
