= Codename: Kids Next Door – Operation: S.O.D.A. =

2004 video game

- North American box art
- Developer: Vicarious Visions
- Publisher: Global Star Software
- Composer: Martin Schioeler
- Series: Codename: Kids Next Door
- Platform: Game Boy Advance
- Release: NA: November 2, 2004
- Genre: Platform
- Mode: Single player

Codename: Kids Next Door – Operation: S.O.D.A. is a 2004 platform video game based on the American animated television series Codename: Kids Next Door on Cartoon Network. Developed by Vicarious Visions and published by Global Star Software for the Game Boy Advance, it was released exclusively in North America.

Operation: S.O.D.A. is one of the only two video games to be solely based on Codename: Kids Next Door. The other, Operation: V.I.D.E.O.G.A.M.E., is a 3D platform game developed by High Voltage Software for the PlayStation 2, GameCube, and Xbox.

== Plot ==
With the recent passing of the Soda Control Act, the drinking age of soda has been raised to 13 years and older. The Kids Next Door refuse this attempt at prohibiting children from drinking their favorite beverage, and take it upon themselves to run a secret operation of providing soda to any kid in the world who wants it.

== Gameplay ==
The player navigates an early level as Numbuh One.

The game features 15 platform levels (3 per Operative) and one final boss fight against Mr. Fizz. Each of the characters have different abilities and weapons that helps them avoid obstacles and reach the goal. While Numbuhs 3, 4, and 5's levels are Terrestral, Numbuhs 1 and 2's are Aerial.

== Reception ==
Operation S.O.D.A. received negative feedback from critics, with Nintendo Power giving the game a 54% rating, and MyGamer giving it a similar 56% rating.
