= Red Ace Squadron =

2001 video game

Red Ace Squadron/Red Ace Squadron Pro
- Red Ace Squadron logo
- Developer(s): Small Rockets
- Publisher(s): Small Rockets
- Platform(s): Windows
- Release: December 2001
- Genre(s): Vehicle simulation game
- Mode(s): Single-player, multiplayer

Red Ace Squadron is a computer vehicle simulation game developed and published by Small Rockets in 2001. There is also an enhanced version named Red Ace Squadron Pro, which is an update to the game based on complaints and feedback from players. It is a sequel to the game Master of the Skies: The Red Ace. The game is compatible with 32-bit Windows systems from Windows 95b to Windows XP, although it is sometimes possible to run it in a 64-bit operating system, but with graphical and stability issues.

== Gameplay ==
The game takes place in World War I. There are 21 missions in total, with 10 having the player fight on the German side and 10 having him on the Allied side. A secret mission is also unlockable. Completing all singleplayer missions will unlock Master mode, in which the player faces a higher difficulty and numbers of enemies.

The game features 11 types of planes. Each faction has 4 types of planes that can be controlled by the player, with the Allied side sporting the Airco DH.2, the Sopwith Camel, the SPAD S.XIII, and the Nieuport 17, while the German side has the Halberstadt CL.II, the Junkers D.I, the Gotha G.V and the Fokker Dr.I. There are 3 types of aircraft in the game that the player is not able to control, those being the Albatros D.III, the Handley Page Type O and the Bristol Scout.

There are many different types of missions, including escorting allied units, bombing convoys and factories, dogfights and so on.

== Pro version ==
A Pro version of Red Ace Squadron was released after a year of development. The main updates in the Pro version are improved loading speeds, updated key bindings to get around Windows XP 'sticky keys' and improved documentation. Single-player mode now had 4 levels of difficulty to be chosen from, while multiplayer saw many new features including file verification against the server to stop cheating, the ability to change aircraft map visibility with 5 different modes, and the ability to choose the map the game would start on. Servers were updated to be configurable from inside the server program, display its IP address, and allow a name and a game type name, and could also be password protected. Pick Up configuration was also improved by changing the frequency of Pick Ups, the ability to disable or re-enable Pick Ups, and the amount of ordinance a Pick Up gives to the players. Pick Ups could also be given to players entering the arena. Game-mode features were enabled within the game and versioning was introduced to stop clashes with different server/client versions. Game rooms were also expanded to accommodate 8 players at a time and a bug showing the incorrect number of players/active players/game type/name was fixed.

== Proposed sequel ==
Jon Small had planned to launch the sequel to Red Ace Squadron in 2008, but the release date was delayed. The game was to feature a new graphics engine, multiplayer settings, as well as bigger and more detailed landscapes. The game would have been set in World War I. With the closing of Small Rockets in 2012, the game's development state is unknown, but is presumed to be halted.

Parallel to Red Ace Squadron 2, a second update for the original game was being developed, called Red Ace Squadron Pro2. Like in the original update, it was to be directed by community feedback.
