= Small Rockets =

Defunct computer game developer company

Small Rockets was a British computer game developer located in Guildford, England. The company was founded in October 2000 and created and sold PC games online.

== History ==
Small Rockets was born from the ashes of Fiendish Games, a department of Criterion Games (also known as Criterion Software), that was started to test the waters for delivering games online rather than through traditional retail channels. When Fiendish Games was shut down, the then head of department Jonathan Small set up Small Rockets to continue where Fiendish Games had left off. The company licensed the games created by Fiendish Games from Criterion, and most of the Fiendish Games employees moved with Jonathan to the new company.

Fiendish Games has no connection with the board game company of the same name; the board game company changed its name to Fiendish Board Games after coming to an agreement with Criterion Games.

In addition to its commercial games Small Rockets also produced a bespoke 'one off' game called 'HP Spy Academy' for a HP exhibition at 'Stuff Live' in 2002.

Work continued on several more PC titles and a Game Boy Advance title until most of the employees had to be let go, largely for financial reasons, in 2003.

Due to the increasing costs of running a UK-registered limited-liability company from the US, the decision was made in 2012 to shut the company down. The Small Rockets website displayed a formal notice of the shutdown from early July, at which point the site's shop was also disabled. Full shutdown of the Small Rockets servers (including the website itself) occurred in late August. Jonathan has stated that he hopes to continue Small Rockets' Red Ace franchise.

== Small Rockets Games ==
=== Games originally written as part of Fiendish Games ===
- Natural Fawn Killers (abbreviated NFK)
- Tower of the Ancients
- Master of the Skies: The Red Ace
- Art is Dead
- Hot Chix 'n' Gear Stix
- Hot Chix 'n' Gear Stix 2
- Small Rockets Poker
- Small Rockets Mah Jongg
- Small Rockets Backgammon

=== Games released wholly by Small Rockets ===
- NFK: Santa's Gone Postal
- Star Monkey
- Ultra Assault
- Red Ace Squadron
- Assimilation
- Sean Murray Wakeboarding (GBA)
- Sinbad (PC)
