= Jetfighter III =

1996 video game

- Developer(s): Mission Studios
- Publisher(s): Interplay Entertainment
- Series: Jetfighter
- Platform(s): MS-DOS
- Release: November 20, 1996
- Genre(s): Combat flight simulator
- Mode(s): Single-player, multiplayer

Jetfighter III is a 1996 video game developed by Mission Studios and published by Interplay for DOS. It is the third game in the Jetfighter series. An expansion pack, Enhanced Campaign CD, was released in April 1997. It added 74 new missions and two new regions.

== Development ==
Around 1996, Take-Two Interactive was making about US$10 million, but Ryan Brant wanted to further expand the company, and made its first acquisition of Mission Studios and publishing its JetFighter III game in 1996.

== Gameplay ==
Jetfighter III is a game in which the player is the pilot of the F-22N - a fictional version of the F-22 fighter - and has been assigned to work as part of a battle group for the United Nations.

== Reception ==
Next Generation reviewed the PC version of the game, rating it four stars out of five, and stated that "Jetfighter III manages to soar high when others flop. If you're in the market for a thrilling (but not necessarily realistic) representation of modern air combat, Jetfighter III is a perfect choice. Only a lack of multiplayer support and mild problems with the game's realism keep this from five-star territory."

== Reviews ==
- Computer Gaming World #152 (Mar 1997)
- PC Games (Germany) - Jan, 1997
- PC Player (Germany) - Jan, 1997
