= Jack of All Games =

American video game distributor

Jack of All Games, Inc.
- Company type: Subsidiary
- Industry: Video games
- Founded: 1989; 37 years ago
- Founder: David Rosenbaum
- Defunct: February 26, 2010
- Fate: Merged into New Age Electronics
- Headquarters: West Chester Township, Ohio, US
- Area served: North America, Europe, Australia
- Parent: Take-Two Interactive (1998–2010); Synnex (2010)
- Subsidiaries: Jack of All Games NY; Jack of All Games UK; Jack of All Games France; Jack of All Games Australia; Jack of All Games Scandinavia; Jack of All Games Germany; Jack of All Games Canada; Jack of All Games Italy

Jack of All Games, Inc. was an American distributor of video games and video game-related hardware based in West Chester Township, Ohio. Founded by David Rosenbaum in 1989, the company was sold to Take-Two Interactive in August 1998. Through a series of acquisitions and mergers, Jack of All Games expanded by nine further offices in nine countries between February and October 1999. Following an outsourcing deal in October 2008, the company was sold to Synnex in February 2010, where it was merged into Synnex' New Age Electronics division.

== History ==
Jack of All Games was founded by David Rosenbaum in 1989, based in West Chester Township, Ohio. The company was acquired by Take-Two Interactive on August 25, 1998, for approximately US$16.8 million in stock.

In February 1999, Take-Two Interactive combined various of their international distribution outlets into Jack of All Games: Alliance Inventory Management (based in New York City) became Jack of All Games NY, LDA Distribution (London and Paris) became Jack of All Games UK and Jack of All Games France, and Directsoft (Sydney) became Jack of All Games Australia. The new offices were followed up by Funsoft Nordic (Oslo, Copenhagen and Stockholm), which was acquired by Take-Two Interactive in March 1999 and subsequently renamed Jack of All Games Scandinavia. An office in Munich, Germany, was opened on July 1, 1999. Triad Distributors and Global Star Software, respectively a software distributor and a budget-range game publisher, both of which were founded in 1993 by Craig McGauley and Damian Cristiani, and operated under the same management team and from the same facilities in Concord, Ontario, were acquired by Take-Two Interactive in September 1999 and combined into Jack of All Games Canada. In October 1999, Take-Two Interactive acquired Italian publisher CD Verte, which became Jack of All Games Italy. In November 2002, the company secured a North American distribution deal with NewKidCo.

On September 9, 2008, Take-Two Interactive announced that, effective immediately, all Jack of All Games operations, including all employees and their West Chester office lease, would be outsourced to Ditan, the distribution arm of Cinram.

In October 2008, Robert Alexander, the president of Jack of All Games at the time of its acquisition, filed a complaint with the United States District Court for the District of Nevada against Take-Two Interactive executives Paul Eibler and Richard Roedel, who Alexander alleged had implemented a scheme that procedurally lowered his compensation as a key employee for the company. According to Alexander, the company owed him "a $240,000 salary with guaranteed 20% raises for three years, a $25,000 monthly expense allowance, a $0.50 royalty on each game passed through his distribution chain, and a large chunk of Take-Two stock", due to which was a seeking a total of $50 million in damages for breach of contract.

On December 21, 2009, Take-Interactive announced that they had agreed to sell Jack of All Games to Synnex for $43.25 million. According to Ben Feder, chief executive officer for the company the time, Take-Two Interactive wanted to shift their focus to their "core business strategy"—video game publishing. The acquisition closed on February 26, 2010, and Jack of All Games was effectively merged into Synnex' New Age Electronics division.
