= Outdoor Life: Sportsman's Challenge =

2004 video game

- Developer: Cat Daddy Games
- Publisher: Take-Two Interactive
- Platform: Microsoft Windows
- Release: October 5, 2004
- Genre: Business simulation game
- Mode: Single-player

Outdoor Life: Sportsman's Challenge is a business simulation game developed by Cat Daddy Games and published by Take-Two Interactive in 2004. In Outdoor Life, the player must build a park in one of several locations without going bankrupt.

== Gameplay ==
=== Gameplay Modes ===
Outdoor Life features two distinct modes of play: instant action and challenge. Instant action allows the player to choose from one of twelve possible park locations, all of which provide different challenges and opportunities to the player. Upon choosing one of the twelve locations, the player is then granted $25,000 and can build the park as much as they wish before officially deciding to open it. The challenge mode features many of the same gameplay features as instant action, however, the main difference is that there is a more pointed focus in terms of there being a specific objective along with certain other limitations such as a requirement to complete said objective within a certain limited time frame. In all, there are 12 available challenges, grouped in three sections of four, based on difficulty: beginner, intermediate, and advanced.

=== Buildings ===
There are five categories of buildings which the player can build from: lodge, food and entertainment, construction and expansion, shops, and administration and safety. Lodge includes the buildings where guests stay while visiting the park as well as the park's bathroom facilities; this includes lodges, cabins, and campsites as well as the washroom for guests' bathroom needs. Food and entertainment comprises the places where guests can get food, drink, and fun and includes bars and pubs, ATV and boat rentals, and park tours. Construction and expansion is mainly the different buildings involved in the infrastructure of the player's park and includes construction buildings for clearing out land and building larger buildings, a maintenance building for maintaining the park's different structures, a groundskeeper building for keeping the park clean, and a trail building which allows the player to build hiking trails for park guests. Shops provide guests with everything they might need during their stay in the park and includes everything from gun and bow and arrow shops to hunter and fisherman supply shops to general stores and meat lockers. Administration and safety includes a range of buildings relating to the management of the park including the tags and licensing building where guests can buy needed tags, the ranger station and fire tower to control forest fires, the conservation center to manage wildlife populations, the gun and trail safety building to properly train guests, and the first aid and seek and rescue buildings to find and treat injured guests.

=== Guests and Staff ===
Once the player decides to open the park, they will be prompted with a screen which will allow them to allocate as many funds as they deem fit to advertise to different groups that they wish to attract to their park. Following this, the player officially begins the process of booking the guests who will then stay in the park for seven game days. The six types of guests, each of which are fairly self-explanatory, that one can attract to their park are: fishermen, fowl hunters, small game hunters, medium game hunters, big game hunters, and sightseers. In addition to guests, the player must hire a range of different people to ensure the park operates successfully. The seven types of employees that the player can hire are: maintenance workers, groundskeepers, rangers, game wardens, search and rescue workers, tour guides, and safety guides. The maintenance worker maintains the buildings in the park, the groundskeeper ensures that the park is kept clean, the ranger puts out forest fires, the game warden cracks down on poaching which is essential to prevent overexploitation of animals (it is possible to manually buy animals but this is quite expensive), the search and rescue worker heals injured guests, the tour guide leads tours on park trails, and the safety guide teaches guests how to be more safe.

== Reception ==
The game received decidedly mixed reviews, on its release. Game Zone argued that it was "truly a niche game...There is just too much to know about the delicate ecosystem with wildlife and hunter's needs." IGN added that the screens were confusing and it was never elucidated how the decisions made ultimately effect the game world. Overall, the general consensus was that the concepts of the game were solid, but were too complicated and difficult to understand and the game generally lacked polish. One important thing to consider is that both Take-Two Interactive and Cat Daddy were making quite a few tycoon based games at the time this game was developed and so this likely effected the game's final quality. Spanish PC Life magazine gave a rating of six out of ten. Strana Igr called it a good game with great graphics and translation.
