= UFC: Sudden Impact =

2004 video game

- Cover art, featuring late UFC Hall of Famer Mask being hit by Phil Baroni
- Developer: Opus
- Publishers: WW: Global Star; JP: Marvelous Entertainment
- Director: Ryota Hayashi
- Producers: Taka Suzuki; Takeshi Shimizu
- Designer: Takashi Urushihara
- Composer: Jun Enoki
- Platform: PlayStation 2
- Release: NA: April 20, 2004; JP: April 22, 2004; EU: May 21, 2004
- Genres: Versus fighting, Sports
- Modes: Single-player; Offline multiplayer

UFC: Sudden Impact, known in Japan as UFC 2004, is a mixed martial arts video game featuring Ultimate Fighting Championship properties and fighters developed by Opus and published by Global Star. It was released in 2004 for the PlayStation 2. It is the fourth UFC game released and the second and last on the PlayStation 2.

== Gameplay ==
=== Fighting and combat basics ===
The gameplay in Sudden Impact is very similar to that of the previous entries in the series. Each fighter possess a fighting style that varies between Boxing, Karate, Kung-Fu, Kempo, Muay Thai, Ninjitsu, Sambo, Submission, Sumo, Pro Wrestling, Kickboxing, Wrestling, Brazilian Jiu-Jitsu, and more. Each of the four face buttons on the controller specifically controls one of the fighter's limbs. By hitting two buttons at once, the player can perform a takedown, a grappling move, a submission move or other similar technique. An addition made to Sudden Impact's gameplay is an added focus on fence positioning. When backing an opponent into the cage that surrounds the Octagon ring, attempting a grapple maneuver will put the player into one of several different possible positions, including a standing face-off as well as a special ground-mount, where the bottom fighter's head is literally pressed against the cage. The overall gameplay is also slightly faster in comparison to the previous games. Fights are announced by Bruce Buffer and refereed by "Big" John McCarthy.

=== Arcade and Versus ===
In Arcade mode, the player choose a fighter and fights against CPU controlled opponents for an unlimited number of fights. On Versus, up to two players fight against each other.

=== Story Mode ===
In Story Mode, the player can create a custom mixed martial artist. The player starts as a street fighter who is found by an MMA trainer. The trainer sets the player on the path of making it to the UFC within three years. The player then chooses one dojo out of eight, each with their own fighting styles. Each aspect of the training requires the player to perform a specific challenge, such as landing three left punches or taking an opponent down twice in a match, and more. Winning challenges earns stat points and new moves. At the end of each month, the player is presented with an evaluation challenge, which varies between hitting a punching bag in a timing-based minigame or a simulation of the created fighter sparring against another recruit or fighter.

In December of each year, the player take part in an amateur Open Weight UFC-style tournament against a number of generic characters. The mode ends after three years of training are completed and the player successfully reaches the UFC. Additionally, graduating to the UFC level means that the created fighter will be available in the remainder of the game's modes.

=== Champion Road ===
In Champion Road, the player picks a fighter and must win four fights before having a title match. On winning, the player receives a Silver Belt. If the player choose the same fighter again, Champion Road will become Legend Mode and it is needed to win nine matches before receiving a title shot and winning the Gold Belt. On these modes, the player will only fight against fighters in the same weight class, and it is necessary to win titles to unlock certain characters in that class.

=== Tournament ===
In Tournament mode, the player can compete in an eight-man elimination tournament that mirrors the early UFC events. The player has to win two matches before reaching the final and win the tournament.

== Reception ==
Reception

Aggregate score
Aggregator	Score
Metacritic	54/100

Review scores
Publication	Score
Computer Games Magazine	1/4
Electronic Gaming Monthly	4.83/10
Famitsu	28/40
Game Informer	6.5/10
GamePro	3/5
GameRevolution	D+
GameSpot	6/10
GameSpy	3/5
GameZone	7/10
Official U.S. PlayStation Magazine	2/5

The game received "mixed" reviews, a bit more than the UFC games before it, according to the review aggregation website Metacritic. In Japan, Famitsu gave it a score of one six, two sevens, and one eight for a total of 28 out of 40.

== See also ==
- List of fighting games
