= Jump 'n Bump =

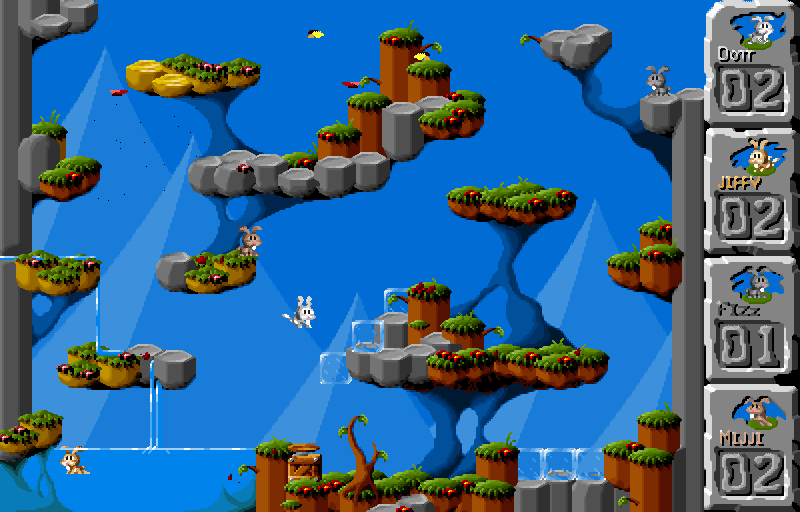
- Developer: Brainchild Design
- Publisher: Brainchild Design
- Platforms: MS-DOS, Windows, Linux, Mac OS X, FreeBSD, GP32, BeOS, PlayStation 2, Xbox, RISC OS
- Release: 1998
- Genre: Platform
- Mode: Multiplayer

Jump 'n Bump is a 1998 freeware (or emailware) and open-source MS-DOS platform multiplayer video game by Brainchild Design.

== Gameplay ==
Jump 'n Bump has no plot, other than that it involves up to four rabbits in multiplayer deathmatch: Dott, Jiffy, Fizz, and Mijji, trying to hop onto each other's heads to squish each other and score a point, while sending gibs flying everywhere. The rabbits are controlled by players on the same computer, using the keyboard, mouse, and/or joystick.

== Development ==
Jump 'n Bump was written in C and Assembly language by Brainchild Design in 1998. The graphics were made with Deluxe Paint 2 and PaintShop Pro 5. The Mod music was made with FastTracker 2. Although the players' scores are tracked, the game continues indefinitely until it is ended by the players.

In 1999 the game with its source code was released as Emailware. The game has since been ported to a number of other operating systems and platforms, with the release of a SDL version.

Brainchild Design has since become inactive. Their website refers to Bitbliss Studios for more games.

== Reception ==
Jump 'n Bump was mentioned as one of the earliest "instant kill games" when Samurai Gunn was compared to it in 2013. The N++ developers cited in 2014 Jump 'n Bump as inspiration for the Deathmatch mode in their game.

Due to the popularity and source code availability the game was ported to newer systems and platforms like Windows, Android, PlayStation 2, Wii and several others.

== See also ==
- Super Mario War
- List of open-source video games
