= JetFighter V: Homeland Protector =

2003 combat flight simulator video game

- Developer(s): InterActive Vision
- Publisher(s): Global Star Software
- Platform(s): Microsoft Windows
- Release: October 21, 2003

Jetfighter V: Homeland Protector is a combat flight simulator video game developed by Polish studio Interactive Vision and published by Global Star Software in 2003.

== Development ==
The game was first announced on July 9, 2003.

== Reception ==
Reception

Aggregate score
Aggregator	Score
Metacritic	56/100

Review score
Publication	Score
PC Gamer (US)	54/100
