= Jetpack (video game) =

1993 video game

- Developer: Adam Pedersen (Adept Software)
- Publisher: Software Creations
- Platform: MS-DOS
- Release: 1993
- Genre: Platform
- Modes: Single-player, multiplayer

Jetpack is a platform game available as freeware, developed by American studio Adept Software and originally published as shareware by Software Creations in 1993. The object of the levels is to collect all of the green emeralds scattered around the level while avoiding obstacles and enemies. Once accomplished, a door opens which the player must go through in order to advance to the next level. There is a single player, and a local multiplayer mode. The multiplayer mode supports up to eight players, where players take turns on the same machine.

== Gameplay ==
The player is aided in his quest by a jetpack and a phase shifter, which allows tunnelling through certain walls. The environments, which usually consist of mazes of bricks, also feature vines, gold, ladders, ice, boxes, pillars, and conveyor belts. Other obstacles include jagged rocks, force fields, teleport pads, and indestructible bricks. In order to keep his jetpack running, the player has to collect fuel, by means of single/double tanks or fuel grids.

The level editor with tile-select menu open

The game includes a level editor. Numerous levels have been published on Adept Software's website. The registered game features 100 pre-built levels. The developers also released a hintbook containing screenshots and a short piece of advice for every level.

== Release ==
Jetpack was released in several variations, including a Christmas version with completely different levels, where the player became Santa and ran around leaving presents at Christmas trees instead of collecting emeralds. The Christmas version was almost exactly the same, but with different levels and a few more festive sprites. There was also a version designed for children.

== Legacy ==
A sequel, Jetpack 2, was announced in early 2008. After being in development for years, it was released in June 2017.
