= Master of the Skies: The Red Ace =

2000 video game

- Developer(s): Fiendish Games
- Publisher(s): Small Rockets
- Platform(s): Windows
- Release: April 30, 2000
- Genre(s): Vehicle simulation game, action
- Mode(s): Single-player

Master of the Skies: The Red Ace (also called Hunt for the Red Baron) is a World War I dogfighting game marketed by Small Rockets. This game is currently only distributed via the internet.

== History ==
This game was originally developed by Fiendish Games, but the company soon became bankrupt and was not able to sell the game any more. Small Rockets resumed the distribution of the game, besides releasing a sequel called Red Ace Squadron in 2001.

== Gameplay ==
The gameplay is based on World War I with the player taking the role of flying one of the earliest Allied combat aircraft in history. The player has to complete missions like fighting enemy aircraft, destroying tanks and AA cannons, bombing factories, saving fellow pilots etc. As the player progresses through levels, he is given higher ranks from Corporal to Colonel. There are a total of 25 missions set in three different areas: France, Belgium and Africa. There are four aircraft available to fly which the computer automatically selects for the player. The player is equipped with machine guns and either rockets or bombs. In the final mission, the player finally manages to track the Red Baron, engages him in combat, and emerges as the victor. As soon as the last mission is completed, the player gets access to numerous cheat codes.

== Reception ==
The game obtained a good critical and customer reception owing to its graphics and storyline. PC Gamer (UK Magazine) gave the game an 83/100 rating while Lake's Digital Arts gave an 8/10 rating. IGN PC praised the game for its then innovative use of digital distribution, and made the following good comment on the game: It's fast as lightning, ... and fun -- just like real flying!
