= Sudoku Fever =

2006 video game

- Developer: puzzle.tv
- Publisher: Global Star Software
- Platform: Game Boy Advance
- Release: 8 February 2006
- Genre: Puzzle
- Mode: Single-player

Sudoku Fever (also titled Global Star Sudoku Fever) is a 2006 sudoku puzzle video game developed by puzzle.tv and published by Global Star Software, a publishing wing of Take-Two Interactive. Upon release, the game received mixed reviews, with praise for the game's puzzles, but critiques of its visual presentation and lack of additional features.

== Gameplay ==
Gameplay screenshot

Sudoku Fever is a handheld iteration of sudoku, which is a puzzle where players enter numbers from 1 to 9 on a nine-by-nine grid, subdivided into three-by-three subgrids. The objective of the game is to fill in the digits so each row, column, and subgrid correctly contains each number from 1 to 9 without repeating. Sudoku Fever also offers sudoku puzzles at varying difficulty levels (Classic, Eight, Mini and Junior) with different-sized grids, including 9-by-9, 8-by-8, 6-by-6 and 4-by-4, and puzzles with symbols instead of numbers. It also contains a Sudoku Solver mode, in which players can input the sudoku puzzles they find elsewhere for a solution.

== Reception ==
Reception

Review scores
Publication	Score
AllGame	3/5
GameZone	7.5/10
Jeuxvideo.com	11/20
Nintendo Power	4/10

Despite enjoying the puzzles, several critics considered Sudoku Fever had limited features and a poor visual presentation. GameZone appreciated the "elegant" design of the puzzles and felt it offered some gameplay choices and difficulty options, but considered the game's presentation was "average and somewhat uninteresting" and the overall package was "straightforward". Scott Alan Mariott of Allgame felt Sudoku Fever had a "barebones" presentation, critiquing its "ugly-looking backgrounds" and bland audio, stating "the interface, options and puzzles are great, it's just a shame the rest of the package isn't as slickly produced". Describing the game as overall "underwhelming", Nintendo Power critiqued the game's "bland presentation and dearth of play modes". Jeuxvideo stated they did not see the advantage of playing sudoku on a handheld console compared to pen and paper, finding "nothing particularly surprising" and viewing the graphics to be "austere" and "sorely lacking in color and vibrancy".
