= JetFighter: The Adventure =

1988 video game

- Publisher(s): Velocity Development
- Platform(s): MS-DOS
- Release: 1988
- Genre(s): Combat flight simulator

JetFighter: The Adventure is a 1988 video game published by Velocity Development for MS-DOS.

== Gameplay ==
JetFighter: The Adventure is a game in which a modern air combat simulator has 32 missions as well as training missions.

== Reception ==
Daniel Hockman reviewed the game for Computer Gaming World, and stated that "Although this first offering from Velocity shows a few rough edges, it is a very, very good product. The blazing fast state of the art animation is unsurpassed. Should your Defense Department approve the acquisition of this weapon system? Affirmative!"
