= Global Star Software =

American video game publisher

- Type: Subsidiary
- Industry: Video games
- Founded: 1993; 33 years ago in Mississauga, Ontario
- Founder: Craig McGauley; Damien Cristiani
- Defunct: 2007
- Fate: Absorbed into 2K Games and renamed to 2K Play
- Successor: 2K Games; 2K Play
- Headquarters: New York City, New York, US
- Parent: Triad Distributors (1993-1999); Take-Two Interactive (1999-2007)

Global Star Software was an American video game publisher that was originally a Canadian video game publisher that was formed in 1993 by Triad Distributors. It was sold to Take-Two Interactive in 1999, briefly escalating into an AAA game publisher after Gotham Games shuttered in 2003 before the formation of 2K in 2005, before being retired in 2007 in favor of the 2K label.

== History ==
=== Early years ===
The company was originally founded in 1993 as a Canadian video game publisher by Craig McGauley and Damien Cristiani and it was based in Mississauga, Ontario, primarily to publish video games, alongside Triad Distributors, a company that was formed around the same time.

The company intends to publish educational software and action games around the time as a unit of Triad Distributors, alongside the HealthWare lifestyle software.

In 1998, the company intended to sell Triad Distributors, along with to Games Trader, Inc., but the deal collapsed after an attempt to close the deal was never materialized.

=== Sale to Take Two Interactive ===
In 1999, the company, along with its parent company Triad Distributors, was sold to Take-Two Interactive and became part of Jack of All Games' Canadian operations. Although controlled by Take-Two, the company remained intact and published games using its own logo as a publishing label. The company later started publishing games for the Linux and Palm platforms. In 2000, the company announced the release of Siege of Avalon.

In 2002 Global Star Software launched its Global ProBiz lineup of over a dozen business and utility products. Global Star also continued its efforts in the PDA software market, spearheading new initiatives such as multi-platform releases for both Palm and Pocket PC devices.

By the end of 2002, Global Star was reorganized and became a division of Take-Two's Jack of All Games' Canadian operations along with Triad Distributors. Shortly thereafter, Take-Two announced that Global Star's products would henceforth be sold exclusively through their Jack of All Games' sales force to strengthen the company's position in the value-priced product category.

In 2003, the company gained major attention when the company announced their budget title Airport Tycoon 2, a sequel of its own title Airport Tycoon. It became a major hit.

=== Move to New York City ===
In mid-2003, Global Star Software was reorganized and all distribution operations were consolidated operationally into the new company located within the Take-Two corporate facilities in New York City, moving it out of Canada. In late 2003, the company took over the publishing functions from the defunct game label of Take-Two, Gotham Games due to an internal reorganization.

The company also started publishing console games around the same time and its status briefly became that of an AAA mainstream publisher alongside its Rockstar Games label. In 2003, Take-Two acquired Cat Daddy Games and it was integrated into the Global Star Software label.

Also that year, Take-Two Interactive acquired TDK Mediactive and became Take-Two Licensing, and the publishing business of Take-Two Licensing was merged into Global Star Software later on. After the acquisition, Take-Two released a TDK-inherited title, UFC: Sudden Impact, under the Global Star Software label, under Take-Two's inherited deal with UFC from TDK Mediactive. Also, the company released Robotech: Invasion in 2004 for Xbox and PlayStation 2, using the Robotech license it inherited from TDK Mediactive.

In 2004, Global Star's profile was increased when Take-Two Interactive signed a deal with Sega and ESPN to publish the 2K line of sports video games under the Global Star Software label, most notably the line of NBA 2K, NHL 2K and NFL 2K video games. The company later published the AAA game title Conflict: Vietnam in North America in 2004. On September 9, 2004, Global Star Software took over the publishing operations of Gathering of Developers. In late 2004, the company had acquired Indie Built and it was integrated into Global Star.

=== Emergence of 2K and demise of company ===
In 2005, Take-Two Interactive launched another publishing label, 2K Games, and took over the function Global Star briefly had for mainstream AAA gaming, leaving Global Star down to just family-friendly, budget-priced and casual games. This came after 2K Games had acquired Visual Concepts, and the Indie Built brand has been transferred to 2K.

In early 2006, the company released Sudoku Fever for the Game Boy Advance. In 2006, the company announced a licensing deal with Endemol, to release video games based on the Deal or No Deal game show for the PC. In 2007, the company announced the release of Carnival Games, developed by Take Two's Cat Daddy Games studio, for the Wii.

In 2007, the company was fully absorbed into 2K, and Global Star Software was renamed to 2K Play. This came after Take-Two Interactive had signed a deal with Nickelodeon to release games based on Dora the Explorer and Go, Diego, Go!.
