= List of PlayStation Portable games =

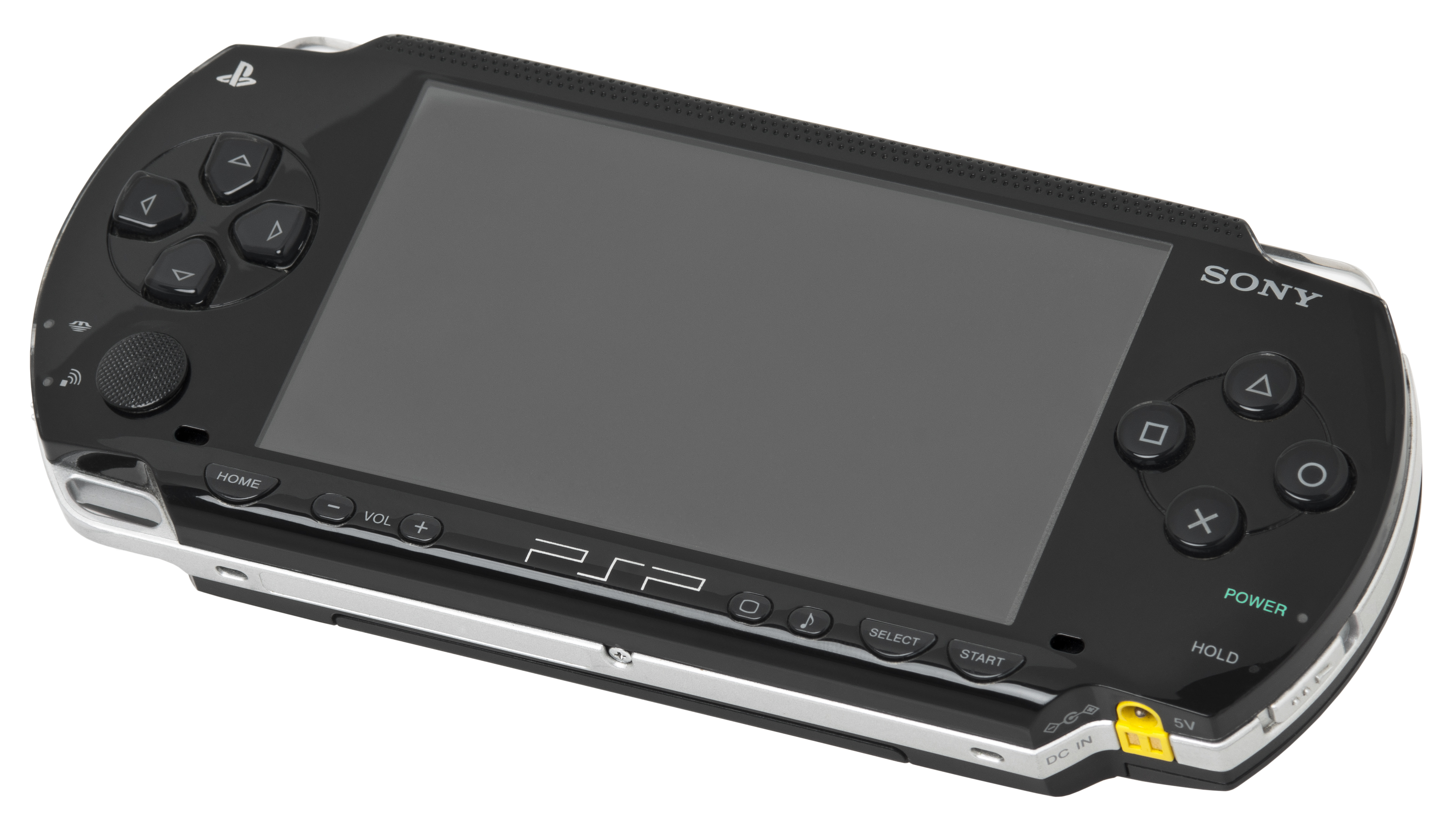
The PSP-1000 model

Top box banner

This is a list of games for the Sony PlayStation Portable handheld console. It does not include PSOne classics, PS minis, or NEOGEO Station. Games have been released in several regions around the world; North America (NA), Japan (JP), Europe (EU), and Australia (AUS).

The games show the date the game was first released in that region.

Notes:

- Some games have multiple publishers, varying by region. In these cases, the publishers are ordered by release date for their respective regions.
- Alternate English titles are listed underneath the main title.

There are currently 1912 games on this list.

== Released ==
Title	North America	Europe	Asia/Japan	Australia	Developer	Publisher
-8 (Minus 8)	Unreleased	Unreleased	January 23, 2014	Unreleased	Otomate; Rejet	Idea Factory
.hack//Link	Unreleased	Unreleased	March 4, 2010	Unreleased	CyberConnect2	Namco Bandai Games
0 Ji no Kane to Cinderella: Halloween Wedding	Unreleased	Unreleased	May 23, 2013	Unreleased	QuinRose	QuinRose
1/2 summer+	Unreleased	Unreleased	July 18, 2013	Unreleased	ALcot Honey Comb	Alchemist
101-in-1 Megamix	September 20, 2010	September 22, 2010	Unreleased	Unreleased	Ivolgamus	Nordcurrent
11eyes: Crossover	Unreleased	Unreleased	January 28, 2010	Unreleased	Lass	5pb.
12 Ji no Kane to Cinderella: Halloween Wedding	Unreleased	Unreleased	February 23, 2012	Unreleased	QuinRose	QuinRose
12Riven: The Psi-Climinal of Integral	Unreleased	Unreleased	April 16, 2009	Unreleased	CyberFront	CyberFront
2006 FIFA World Cup	May 22, 2006	May 19, 2006	June 1, 2006	May 19, 2006	Exient Entertainment	EA Sports
2010 FIFA World Cup South Africa	April 27, 2010	April 30, 2010	Unreleased	April 29, 2010	HB Studios	EA Sports
24 Ji no Kane to Cinderella: Halloween Wedding	Unreleased	Unreleased	September 20, 2012	Unreleased	QuinRose	QuinRose
300: March to Glory	February 27, 2007	March 30, 2007	Unreleased	April 13, 2007	Collision Studios	Warner Bros. Interactive Entertainment
The 3rd Birthday	March 29, 2011	April 1, 2011	December 22, 2010	April 14, 2011	HexaDrive	Square Enix
428: Fuusa Sareta Shibuya	Unreleased	Unreleased	September 17, 2009	Unreleased	Spike Chunsoft	Sega
50 Cent: Bulletproof G-Unit Edition	August 29, 2006	October 27, 2006	Unreleased	September 21, 2006	High Voltage Software	Vivendi Games
7 Wonders of the Ancient World	April 23, 2007	April 25, 2008	Unreleased	Unreleased	Hot Lava Games	MumboJumbo
7th Dragon 2020	Unreleased	Unreleased	November 23, 2011	Unreleased	Imageepoch	Sega
7th Dragon 2020-II	Unreleased	Unreleased	April 18, 2013	Unreleased	Imageepoch	Sega
77 (Sevens): Beyond the Milky Way	Unreleased	Unreleased	December 22, 2010	Unreleased	Whirlpool	Piacci
Abunai: Koi no Sousashitsu	Unreleased	Unreleased	May 31, 2012	Unreleased	GignoSystem Japan	QuinRose
Akuseru Wārudo -Gin'yoku no Kakusei-	Unreleased	Unreleased	September 13, 2012	Unreleased	Banpresto	Namco Bandai Games
Akuseru Wārudo -Kasoku no Chōten-	Unreleased	October 23, 2006	January 31, 2013	Unreleased	Banpresto	Namco Bandai Games
Ace Combat X: Skies of Deception	October 23, 2006	November 8, 2006	October 26, 2006	November 16, 2006	Namco Bandai Games; Access Games	Namco Bandai Games^{NA/JP} Sony Computer Entertainment^{PAL}
Ace Combat: Joint Assault	August 31, 2010	September 24, 2010	August 26, 2010	September 23, 2010	Project Aces; Access Games	Namco Bandai Games
Aces of War	Unreleased	March 23, 2007	December 22, 2005	Unreleased	Taito	Taito^{JP} 505 Games^{PAL}
Activision Hits Remixed	November 8, 2006	February 9, 2007	Unreleased	February 14, 2007	Digital Eclipse	Activision
Adventures to Go!	October 27, 2009	February 26, 2010	Unreleased	Unreleased	Global A Entertainment	Natsume Inc.
Adventure Player	Unreleased	Unreleased	June 30, 2005	Unreleased	FromSoftware	FromSoftware
Aedis Eclipse: Generation of Chaos	April 24, 2007	March 30, 2011	May 25, 2006	Unreleased	Idea Factory	Idea Factory^{JP} NIS America^{NA} Ghostlight^{PAL}
AFL Challenge	Unreleased	Unreleased	Unreleased	September 10, 2009	Wicked Witch Software	Tru Blu Entertainment; Sony Computer Entertainment
After Burner: Black Falcon	March 21, 2007	March 30, 2007	Unreleased	April 12, 2007	Planet Moon Studios	Sega
Agarest Senki Marriage	Unreleased	Unreleased	July 19, 2012	Unreleased	Felistella; Idea Factory; Red Entertainment	Compile Heart
AI Igo	Unreleased	Unreleased	December 22, 2004	Unreleased	Marvelous Entertainment	Marvelous Entertainment
AI Mahjong	Unreleased	Unreleased	December 22, 2004	Unreleased	Marvelous Entertainment	Marvelous Entertainment
AI Shogi	Unreleased	Unreleased	January 20, 2005	Unreleased	Marvelous Entertainment	Marvelous Entertainment
Ailu de Puzzle	Unreleased	Unreleased	July 19, 2012	Unreleased	Natsume Atari	Capcom
Air	Unreleased	Unreleased	November 22, 2007	Unreleased	Key	Prototype
Air Conflicts: Aces of World War II	April 14, 2009	Unreleased	Unreleased	Unreleased	Cowboy Rodeo	Graffiti Entertainment
Akaneiro ni Somaru Saka: Portable	Unreleased	Unreleased	December 17, 2009	Unreleased	Feng	GN Software
Akatsuki no Amaneka to Aoi Kyojin	Unreleased	Unreleased	March 11, 2010	Unreleased	Kogado Studio	CyberFront
Akatsuki no Goei Trinity	Unreleased	Unreleased	September 20, 2012	Unreleased	Syangrila	Mages
Akaya Akashiya Ayakashino	Unreleased	Unreleased	February 13, 2014	Unreleased	HaccaWorks*	Noctiluca
AKB1/48: Idol to Guam de Koishitara	Unreleased	Unreleased	October 6, 2011	Unreleased	Artdink	Bandai Namco Games
AKB1/48: Idol to Koishitara...	Unreleased	Unreleased	December 23, 2010	Unreleased	Artdink	Bandai Namco Games
AKB1/149: Renai Sousenkyo	Unreleased	Unreleased	December 20, 2012	Unreleased	Artdink	Bandai Namco Games
Akiba's Trip	Unreleased	Unreleased	May 19, 2011	Unreleased	Acquire	Acquire
Akiba's Trip Plus (Note: Update for Akiba's Trip.)	Unreleased	Unreleased	June 14, 2012	Unreleased	Acquire	Acquire
Akudaikan Manyuuki	Unreleased	Unreleased	November 30, 2006	Unreleased	Global A	Global A
Akudaikan Manyuuki: Seigi no Yaiba	Unreleased	Unreleased	February 22, 2007	Unreleased	Global A	Global A
The Akuma Hunters: Exorsister	Unreleased	Unreleased	December 23, 2009	Unreleased	Tamsoft	D3 Publisher
Alien Syndrome	July 24, 2007	September 7, 2007	Unreleased	September 13, 2007	Totally Games	Sega
Aliens vs. Predator: Requiem	November 13, 2007	November 30, 2007	Unreleased	December 6, 2007	Rebellion Developments	Vivendi Games
All Kamen Rider: Rider Generation 2	Unreleased	Unreleased	August 2, 2012	Unreleased	Namco Bandai Games	Namco Bandai Games
Amagōshi no Yakata Portable: Ichiyanagi Nagomu, Saisho no Junan	Unreleased	Unreleased	September 17, 2009	Unreleased	FOG Inc.	Nippon Ichi Software
Amatsu Misora ni! Kumo no Hatate ni	Unreleased	Unreleased	February 16, 2012	Unreleased	Clochette	Prototype
Amnesia	Unreleased	Unreleased	August 11, 2011	Unreleased	Idea Factory	Idea Factory
Amnesia: Crowd	Unreleased	Unreleased	April 18, 2013	Unreleased	Idea Factory	Idea Factory
Amnesia: Later	Unreleased	Unreleased	March 15, 2012	Unreleased	Idea Factory	Idea Factory
Anata o Yurusanai	Unreleased	Unreleased	November 15, 2007	Unreleased	Zener Works; Cavia Inc.	AQ Interactive
Angelique Maren no Roku Kishi	Unreleased	Unreleased	November 17, 2011	Unreleased	Ruby Party	Idea Factory
Angelique Retour	Unreleased	Unreleased	December 17, 2015	Unreleased	Ruby Party	Koei Tecmo Games
Ano Hi Mita Hana no Namae o Bokutachi wa Mada Shiranai	Unreleased	Unreleased	August 30, 2012	Unreleased	Guyzware	5pb
Another Century's Episode Portable	Unreleased	Unreleased	January 13, 2011	Unreleased	FromSoftware	Namco Bandai Games
Antiphona no Seikahime: Tenshi no Gakufu Op.A	Unreleased	Unreleased	October 22, 2009	Unreleased	O-TWO inc.	Nippon Ichi Software
Ao no Exorcist: Genkoku no Labyrinth	Unreleased	Unreleased	April 26, 2012	Unreleased	Bandai Namco Games	Bandai Namco Games
Aoi Sora no Neosphere: Nanoca Flanka Hatsumei Koubouki 2	Unreleased	Unreleased	August 9, 2012	Unreleased	CyberFront	CyberFront
Aoi Umi no Tristia Portable: Nanoca Flanka Hatsumei Koubouki	Unreleased	Unreleased	August 9, 2012	Unreleased	CyberFront	CyberFront
Ape Academy 2	Unreleased	September 29, 2006	December 15, 2005	October 19, 2006	Shift	Sony Computer Entertainment
Ape Escape Academy; Ape Academy (PAL)	January 17, 2006	September 1, 2005	December 30, 2004	September 1, 2005	Shift	Sony Computer Entertainment
Ape Escape: On the Loose; Ape Escape P (PAL)	March 24, 2005	May 5, 2006	March 17, 2005	May 5, 2006	Japan Studio	Sony Computer Entertainment
Ape Quest	January 10, 2008	May 1, 2008	March 19, 2009	May 1, 2008	Shift	Sony Computer Entertainment
Arabians Doubt	Unreleased	Unreleased	January 30, 2014	Unreleased	QuinRose	QuinRose
Arabians Lost	Unreleased	Unreleased	June 28, 2012	Unreleased	QuinRose	QuinRose
Arcana Famiglia	Unreleased	Unreleased	October 27, 2011	Unreleased	HuneX	Comfort
Arcana Famiglia 2	Unreleased	Unreleased	November 14, 2013	Unreleased	HuneX	Comfort
Arcana Famiglia: Festa Regalo!	Unreleased	Unreleased	December 13, 2012	Unreleased	HuneX	Comfort
Arcana Famiglia: Vascello Phantasma no Majutsushi	Unreleased	Unreleased	June 21, 2012	Unreleased	HuneX	Comfort
Archer Maclean's Mercury	April 6, 2005	September 1, 2005	August 4, 2005	September 21, 2005	Awesome Studios	Ignition Entertainment
Arcobaleno! Portable	Unreleased	Unreleased	January 28, 2010	Unreleased	Design Factory; Otomate	Idea Factory
Are You Alice?	Unreleased	Unreleased	April 7, 2011	Unreleased	Otomate	Idea Factory
Armen Noir Portable	Unreleased	Unreleased	April 12, 2012	Unreleased	Design Factory; Otomate	Idea Factory
Armored Core: Formula Front	December 15, 2005	March 3, 2006	December 12, 2004	February 9, 2006	FromSoftware	FromSoftware^{JP} Agetec^{NA} 505 Games^{PAL}
Armored Core: Last Raven Portable	May 3, 2010	July 14, 2010	March 4, 2010	Unreleased	FromSoftware	FromSoftware
Armored Core: Silent Line Portable	February 4, 2010	June 15, 2010	November 19, 2009	Unreleased	FromSoftware	FromSoftware
Armored Core 3 Portable	October 22, 2009	May 19, 2010	July 30, 2009	Unreleased	FromSoftware	FromSoftware
Arms' Heart	Unreleased	Unreleased	November 25, 2010	Unreleased	Hamster Corporation	Hamster Corporation
Army of Two: The 40th Day	January 12, 2010	January 15, 2010	June 24, 2010	January 14, 2010	Buzz Monkey	Electronic Arts
Arthur and the Invisibles	Unreleased	January 9, 2007	Unreleased	February 2, 2007	Étranges Libellules	Atari
Asaki, Yumemishi	Unreleased	Unreleased	April 28, 2011	Unreleased	QuinRose	QuinRose
Asphalt: Urban GT 2	Unreleased	March 30, 2007	Unreleased	March 22, 2007	Virtuos; Game Source	Gameloft
Assassin's Creed: Bloodlines	November 17, 2009	November 20, 2009	December 23, 2009	November 19, 2009	Griptonite Games	Ubisoft
Asterix & Obelix XXL 2 - Mission: Wifix	Unreleased	November 17, 2006	Unreleased	Unreleased	Tate Interactive	Atari
Astro Boy: The Video Game	October 14, 2009	October 22, 2009	October 8, 2009	October 23, 2009	High Voltage Software	D3 Publisher
Astonishia Story	June 27, 2006	June 30, 2006	September 28, 2006^{KOR} September 28, 2006^{JP}	June 23, 2006	Compile Heart	Sonnori^{KOR} Ubisoft^{NA/PAL} Sega^{JP}
Atari Classics Evolved	December 19, 2007	Unreleased	Unreleased	March 7, 2008	Stainless Games	Atari
ATV Offroad Fury Pro	October 26, 2006	June 20, 2008	Unreleased	June 26, 2008	Climax Racing	Sony Computer Entertainment
ATV Offroad Fury: Blazin' Trails	April 19, 2005	February 10, 2006	Unreleased	Unreleased	Climax Racing; Climax LA	Sony Computer Entertainment^{NA} SouthPeak Interactive^{PAL}
Audition Portable	Unreleased	Unreleased	June 4, 2007^{KOR}	Unreleased	T3 Entertainment	T3 Entertainment
Auditorium	January 4, 2011	January 4, 2011	Unreleased	Unreleased	Cipher Prime	Zoo Games
Avatar: The Last Airbender; Avatar: The Legend of Aang (PAL)	October 10, 2006	February 9, 2007	Unreleased	February 8, 2007	Tose	THQ
Ayakashibito -Gen'you Ibunroku- Portable	Unreleased	Unreleased	March 19, 2009	Unreleased	propeller	Dimple Entertainment
B's LOG Party	Unreleased	Unreleased	May 20, 2010	Unreleased	Design Factory	Idea Factory
B-Boy	September 23, 2008	September 29, 2006	Unreleased	October 12, 2006	FreeStyleGames	Sony Computer Entertainment^{PAL} Evolved Games^{NA}
Baka to Test to Shōkanjū Portable	Unreleased	Unreleased	December 13, 2012	Unreleased	Kadokawa Corporation	Kadokawa Corporation
Bakemonogatari Portable	Unreleased	Unreleased	August 23, 2012	Unreleased	Namco Bandai Games	Namco Bandai Games
Bakugan: Defenders of the Core	October 26, 2010	October 29, 2010	Unreleased	Unreleased	Now Production	Activision
Bakumatsu * Ishinden	Unreleased	Unreleased	June 25, 2010	Unreleased	Acquire	Sony Computer Entertainment
Bakumatsu Rock	Unreleased	Unreleased	February 27, 2014	Unreleased	Marvelous AQL	Marvelous AQL
Bakumatsu Rock: Ultra Soul (Note: Update for Bakumatsu Rock.)	Unreleased	Unreleased	September 25, 2014	Unreleased	Marvelous AQL	Marvelous AQL
Bamboo Blade: Sorekara no Chousen	Unreleased	Unreleased	May 28, 2009	Unreleased	Gadget Soft	Gadget Soft
Bara no Ki ni Bara no Hanasaku	Unreleased	Unreleased	December 22, 2010	Unreleased	Cyc Rosé	QuinRose
Battle Dodge Ball 3	Unreleased	Unreleased	February 26, 2013	Unreleased	Namco Bandai Games	Namco Bandai Games
Battle Robot Damashii	Unreleased	Unreleased	February 14, 2013	Unreleased	Namco Bandai Games	Namco Bandai Games
Battle Spirits: Hero's Soul	Unreleased	Unreleased	March 11, 2010	Unreleased	Namco Bandai Games	Namco Bandai Games
Battle Spirits: Kiseki no Hasha	Unreleased	Unreleased	November 12, 2009	Unreleased	Dimps	Namco Bandai Games
BattleZone	November 6, 2006	February 9, 2007	Unreleased	November 24, 2006	Paradigm Entertainment	Atari
Beats	December 6, 2007	November 20, 2007	Unreleased	Unreleased	London Studio	Sony Computer Entertainment
Bejeweled 2	June 28, 2010	June 28, 2010	Unreleased	June 28, 2010	PopCap Games	Sony Online Entertainment
Ben 10: Alien Force	October 28, 2008	February 16, 2009	Unreleased	November 20, 2008	Monkey Bar Games	D3 Publisher
Ben 10 Alien Force: Vilgax Attacks	October 27, 2009	February 12, 2010	Unreleased	November 12, 2009	Papaya Studio	D3 Publisher
Ben 10: Protector of Earth	October 30, 2007	November 9, 2007	Unreleased	November 9, 2007	High Voltage Software	D3 Publisher
Ben 10 Ultimate Alien: Cosmic Destruction	October 5, 2010	January 11, 2011	Unreleased	January 10, 2011	Papaya Studio	D3 Publisher
Beowulf: The Game	December 4, 2007	December 14, 2007	Unreleased	December 13, 2007	Virtuos	Ubisoft
Beta Bloc	December 2, 2009	June 29, 2007	April 6, 2006	November 24, 2009	Tamsoft	D3 Publisher^{JP} Essential Games^{EU/NA} Namco Bandai Games^{AUS}
Beyond the Future Fix: The Time Arrow	Unreleased	Unreleased	December 8, 2011	Unreleased	5pb.	5pb.
The Bigs	June 26, 2007	Unreleased	Unreleased	Unreleased	Blue Castle Games	2K Sports
The Bigs 2	July 7, 2009	Unreleased	Unreleased	Unreleased	Blue Castle Games	2K Sports
Biz Taiken Series: Kigyoudou	Unreleased	Unreleased	March 9, 2006	Unreleased	Kokuyo	Kokuyo
Black Code	Unreleased	Unreleased	June 26, 2014	Unreleased	QuinRose	QuinRose
Black Robinia	Unreleased	Unreleased	February 24, 2011	Unreleased	Broccoli	Broccoli
Black Rock Shooter: The Game	April 23, 2013^{US}	April 25, 2013	August 25, 2011	Unreleased	Imageepoch	Imageepoch^{JP} NIS America^{US/EU}
Black Wolves Saga: Last Hope	Unreleased	Unreleased	December 20, 2012	Unreleased	Rejet	Idea Factory
Blade Dancer: Lineage of Light	July 18, 2006	February 9, 2007	March 2, 2006	Unreleased	Hitmaker	Nippon Ichi Software
BlazBlue: Calamity Trigger Portable	March 10, 2010	October 29, 2010	February 25, 2010	Unreleased	Arc System Works	Arc System Works / Aksys Games
BlazBlue: Continuum Shift II	May 31, 2011	November 4, 2011	March 31, 2011	Unreleased	Arc System Works	Arc System Works / Aksys Games
BlazBlue: Continuum Shift Extend (Note: Update for BlazBlue: Continuum Shift II.)	Unreleased	Unreleased	May 31, 2012	Unreleased	Arc System Works	Arc System Works
Blaze Union: Story to Reach the Future	Unreleased	Unreleased	May 27, 2010	Unreleased	Sting	Atlus
Blazing Souls: Accelate	October 18, 2010	May 30, 2012	July 23, 2009	Unreleased	Idea Factory	Aksys Games
Bleach: Heat the Soul	Unreleased	Unreleased	March 24, 2005	Unreleased	Eighting	SCEI
Bleach: Heat the Soul 2	Unreleased	Unreleased	September 1, 2005	Unreleased	Eighting	SCEI
Bleach: Heat the Soul 3	Unreleased	Unreleased	July 20, 2006	Unreleased	Eighting	SCEI
Bleach: Heat the Soul 4	Unreleased	Unreleased	May 24, 2007	Unreleased	Eighting	SCEI
Bleach: Heat the Soul 5	Unreleased	Unreleased	May 15, 2008	Unreleased	Eighting	SCEI
Bleach: Heat the Soul 6	Unreleased	Unreleased	May 14, 2009	Unreleased	Eighting	SCEI
Bleach: Heat the Soul 7	Unreleased	Unreleased	September 2, 2010	Unreleased	Eighting	SCEI
Bleach: Soul Carnival	Unreleased	Unreleased	October 23, 2008	Unreleased	Eighting	SCEI
Bleach: Soul Carnival 2	Unreleased	Unreleased	December 10, 2009	Unreleased	Eighting	SCEI
Bliss Island	Unreleased	December 8, 2006	Unreleased	Unreleased	PomPom Games	Codemasters
Blitz: Overtime	December 12, 2006	Unreleased	Unreleased	Unreleased	Midway Games	Midway Games
Blokus Portable: Steambot Championship	March 3, 2008	October 3, 2008	September 21, 2006	Unreleased	Irem	Irem / Majesco
Blood+: Final Piece	Unreleased	Unreleased	September 7, 2006	Unreleased	SCEI	Sony Entertainment
Blood Bowl	April 13, 2010	September 18, 2009	Unreleased	Unreleased	Cyanide	Irem / Majesco
Blood: The Last Vampire	Unreleased	Unreleased	January 26, 2006	Unreleased	SCEI	Sony Entertainment
Blue Roses: Yousei to Aoi Hitomi no Senshitachi	Unreleased	Unreleased	September 16, 2010	Unreleased	Namco Bandai Games	Namco Bandai Games
Boku no Natsuyasumi 4: Seitouchi Shounen Tanteidan, Boku to Himitsu no Chizu	Unreleased	Unreleased	July 2, 2009	Unreleased	SCEI	SCEI
Boku no Natsuyasumi Portable	Unreleased	Unreleased	June 29, 2006	Unreleased	SCEI	SCEI
Boku no Natsuyasumi Portable 2: Nazo Nazo Shimai to Chinbotsusen no Himitsu	Unreleased	Unreleased	June 24, 2010	Unreleased	SCEI	SCEI
Boku wa Kimidake o Mitsumeru	Unreleased	Unreleased	December 22, 2011	Unreleased	Hopemoon	Hopemoon
Boku wa Kuukou Kanseikan: Airport Hero Kankuu	Unreleased	Unreleased	December 9, 2010	Unreleased	Sonic Powered	Sonic Powered
Boku wa Kuukou Kanseikan: Airport Hero Naha	Unreleased	Unreleased	September 28, 2006	Unreleased	Electronic Arts	Electronic Arts
Boku wa Kuukou Kanseikan: Airport Hero Narita	Unreleased	Unreleased	June 15, 2006	Unreleased	Electronic Arts	Electronic Arts
Boku wa Kuukou Kanseikan: Airport Hero Shinchitose	Unreleased	Unreleased	February 22, 2007	Unreleased	Electronic Arts	Electronic Arts
Boku wa Tomodachi ga Sukunai Portable	Unreleased	Unreleased	February 23, 2012	Unreleased	Bandai Namco Games	Bandai Namco Games
Bomberman	September 12, 2006	February 9, 2007	July 20, 2006	February 2007	Hudson Soft	Hudson Soft / Konami
Bomberman Land	January 29, 2008	March 14, 2008	February 7, 2008	March 20, 2008	Hudson Soft	Hudson Soft
Bomberman: Bakufuu Sentai Bombermen	Unreleased	Unreleased	March 9, 2006	Unreleased	SCEI	SCEI
Bomberman: Panic Bomber	Unreleased	Unreleased	June 23, 2006	Unreleased	Hudson	Hudson
Bounty Hounds	September 13, 2006	Unreleased	September 21, 2006	Unreleased	XPEC Entertainment	Namco Bandai Games
Boxer's Road 2: The Real	Unreleased	Unreleased	September 28, 2006	Unreleased	Ertain	Ertain
Brain Challenge	December 4, 2008	December 11, 2008	February 5, 2009	December 11, 2008	Gameloft	Gameloft
Brandish: The Dark Revenant	January 13, 2015	April 16, 2015	March 19, 2009	Unreleased	Nihon Falcom	Nihon Falcom / Xseed Games / Marvelous Entertainment
Brave: A Warrior's Tale	August 3, 2009	Unreleased	Unreleased	Unreleased	Collision Studios	Evolved Games
Brave Story: New Traveler	July 31, 2007	Unreleased	July 6, 2006	Unreleased	Game Republic	SCEI / Xseed Games
Breath of Fire III	February 9, 2016	February 10, 2006	August 25, 2005	Unreleased	Capcom	Capcom
Brian Lara 2007 Pressure Play; Ricky Ponting 2007 Pressure Play	Unreleased	August 31, 2007	Unreleased	October 4, 2007	Codemasters	Codemasters
Brooktown High	May 22, 2007	Unreleased	Unreleased	Unreleased	Backbone Entertainment	Konami
Brothers in Arms: D-Day	December 5, 2006	December 8, 2006	Unreleased	November 7, 2006	Ubisoft	Ubisoft
Brothers Conflict: Brillant Blue	Unreleased	Unreleased	September 12, 2013	Unreleased	Idea Factory	Idea Factory
Brothers Conflict: Passion Pink	Unreleased	Unreleased	May 17, 2012	Unreleased	Idea Factory	Idea Factory
Brunswick Pro Bowling	August 21, 2007	September 21, 2007	Unreleased	September 27, 2007	Point of View, Inc.	Crave Entertainment
Bubble Bobble Evolution	December 19, 2006	September 29, 2006	August 31, 2006	Unreleased	Opus	Codemasters
Buji Rock Festival	Unreleased	Unreleased	April 20, 2011	Unreleased	SCEJ	SCEJ
Bullet Butlers	Unreleased	Unreleased	January 26, 2012	Unreleased	Boost On	Boost On
Bunmei Kaika: Aoiza Ibunroku	Unreleased	Unreleased	August 18, 2011	Unreleased	HuneX	FuRyu
Bunmei Kaika: Aoiza Ibunroku Saien (Note: Update for Bunmei Kaika: Aoiza Ibunroku.)	Unreleased	Unreleased	May 17, 2012	Unreleased	HuneX	FuRyu
Burnout Dominator	March 6, 2007	April 27, 2007	September 20, 2007	April 26, 2007	Criterion Games	Electronic Arts
Burnout Legends	September 13, 2005	September 16, 2005	October 20, 2005	September 2005	Criterion Games	Electronic Arts
Burst Error: Eve the First	Unreleased	Unreleased	March 25, 2010	Unreleased	Criterion Games	Electronic Arts
Busou Shinki: Battle Masters	Unreleased	Unreleased	July 15, 2010	Unreleased	Pyramid	Konami
Busou Shinki: Battle Masters Mk.2 (Note: Update for Busou Shinki: Battle Masters.)	Unreleased	Unreleased	September 22, 2011	Unreleased	Konami	Konami
Bust-A-Move Deluxe; Bust-A-Move Ghost	April 4, 2006	March 31, 2006	March 23, 2006	March 30, 2006	Taito	Taito / 505 Games / Majesco
Buzz!: Brain Bender	Unreleased	November 28, 2008	Unreleased	Unreleased	Relentless Software	SCEE
Buzz!: Brain of the UK; Buzz!: Brain of OZ	Unreleased	February 13, 2009	Unreleased	March 26, 2009	Relentless Software	SCEE
Buzz!: Master Quiz	September 23, 2008	July 25, 2008	Unreleased	July 31, 2008	Relentless Software	SCEE / SCEA
Buzz!: Quiz World	Unreleased	December 18, 2009	Unreleased	Unreleased	Curve Studios	SCEE
Buzz!: The Ultimate Music Quiz	Unreleased	January 14, 2011	Unreleased	Unreleased	Relentless Software	SCEE
Cabela's African Safari	October 17, 2006	Unreleased	Unreleased	Unreleased	Activision Value	Activision Value
Cabela's Dangerous Hunts: Ultimate Challenge	April 4, 2006	Unreleased	Unreleased	March 21, 2007	Fun Labs	Activision
Cabela's Legendary Adventures	September 9, 2008	Unreleased	Unreleased	Unreleased	Activision	Activision
Cabela's North American Adventures	September 14, 2010	Unreleased	Unreleased	Unreleased	Activision	Activision
Cake Mania: Baker's Challenge	October 23, 2008	Unreleased	Unreleased	Unreleased	Coresoft	Destineer
Call of Duty: Roads to Victory	March 13, 2007	March 30, 2007	Unreleased	March 30, 2007	Amaze Entertainment	Activision
Canvas 3: Nanairo no Kiseki	Unreleased	Unreleased	April 22, 2010	Unreleased	F&C	GN Software
Capcom Classics Collection Reloaded	October 24, 2006	November 10, 2006	September 7, 2006	November 16, 2006	Capcom	Capcom
Capcom Classics Collection Remixed	March 22, 2006	July 21, 2006	Unreleased	Unreleased	Digital Eclipse	Capcom
Capcom Puzzle World	February 6, 2007	July 13, 2007	Unreleased	July 11, 2007	Capcom	Capcom
Carnage Heart EXA	Unreleased	Unreleased	October 28, 2010	Unreleased	Artdink	Artdink
Carnage Heart Portable	Unreleased	Unreleased	August 3, 2006	Unreleased	Artdink	Genki
Carol Vorderman's Sudoku	March 6, 2007	August 25, 2006	Unreleased	Unreleased	Empire Interactive	Eidos Interactive
Cars	June 6, 2006	July 14, 2006	July 6, 2006	Unreleased	Locomotive Games	THQ
Cars 2: The Video Game	November 8, 2011	October 26, 2011	Unreleased	November 3, 2011	Disney Interactive Studios	Sony Computer Entertainment
Cars Race-O-Rama	October 12, 2009	October 30, 2009	Unreleased	October 29, 2009	Tantalus Media	THQ
Castle Rustle	Unreleased	February 16, 2011	Unreleased	Unreleased	Game Factory Interactive	Game Factory Interactive
Castlevania: The Dracula X Chronicles	October 23, 2007	February 15, 2008	November 8, 2007	April 9, 2008	Konami	Konami
Chameleon; Kameleon	May 5, 2008	November 10, 2006	January 19, 2006	Unreleased	Starfish	Tommo / 505 Games / UFO
Championship Manager	Unreleased	December 6, 2005	Unreleased	Unreleased	Gusto Games	Eidos Interactive
Championship Manager 2006	Unreleased	April 7, 2006	Unreleased	Unreleased	Beautiful Game Studios	Eidos Interactive
Championship Manager 2007	Unreleased	March 16, 2007	Unreleased	April 13, 2007	Beautiful Game Studios	Eidos Interactive
Chandragupta: Warrior Prince	Unreleased	September 27, 2009	Unreleased	Unreleased	Immersive Games	SCEE
Chaos;Head Love Chu*Chu	Unreleased	Unreleased	January 27, 2011	Unreleased	5pb. / Nitroplus	5pb.
Chaos;Head Noah	Unreleased	Unreleased	June 24, 2010	Unreleased	5pb. / Nitroplus	5pb.
Cherry Blossom	Unreleased	Unreleased	December 25, 2008	Unreleased	Takuyo	Takuyo
Chessmaster: The Art of Learning	February 12, 2008	April 11, 2008	Unreleased	March 2008	Ubisoft	Ubisoft
Chikyuu Boueigun 2 Portable	Unreleased	Unreleased	April 7, 2011	Unreleased	Sandlot	D3 Publisher
Chili Con Carnage	February 27, 2007	February 16, 2007	Unreleased	February 23, 2007	Deadline Games	Eidos Interactive
Cho Aniki Zero	March 25, 2010	Unreleased	March 19, 2009	Unreleased	extreme Co., Ltd.	Aksys Games
Chou no Doku: Hana no Kusari - Taishou Tsuyakoi	Unreleased	Unreleased	January 16, 2014	Unreleased	Prototype	Prototype
Chronostacia	Unreleased	Unreleased	April 24, 2014	Unreleased	Idea Factory	Idea Factory
Chuugen no Hasha: Sangoku Shouseiden	Unreleased	Unreleased	February 9, 2006	Unreleased	Namco	Namco
Chuukana Janshi Tenhoo Painyan Remix	Unreleased	Unreleased	June 28, 2007	Unreleased	Jaleco Entertainment	Jaleco Entertainment
CID The Dummy	July 7, 2009	April 17, 2009	Unreleased	Unreleased	Twelve Interactive	Oxygen Games
Cladun: This is an RPG	September 20, 2010	November 17, 2010	February 18, 2010	Unreleased	Nippon Ichi Software	Nippon Ichi Software
ClaDun x2(Classic Dungeon X2)	August 30, 2011	September 21, 2011	March 24, 2011	Unreleased	Nippon Ichi Software	Nippon Ichi Software
Clannad	Unreleased	Unreleased	May 29, 2008	Unreleased	Visual Arts	Prototype
Clannad: Mitsumi Mamoru Sakamichi de - Gekan	Unreleased	Unreleased	July 15, 2010	Unreleased	Prototype	Prototype
Clannad: Mitsumi Mamoru Sakamichi de - Joukan	Unreleased	Unreleased	June 3, 2010	Unreleased	Prototype	Prototype
Class of Heroes	June 9, 2009	Unreleased	June 26, 2008	Unreleased	Zerodiv	Acquire / Atlus
Class of Heroes 2	June 4, 2013	Unreleased	June 25, 2009	Unreleased	Acquire	Gaijinworks
Cloudy with a Chance of Meatballs	September 18, 2009	September 11, 2009	Unreleased	November 19, 2009	Ubisoft	Ubisoft
Clock Zero! Shuuen no Ichibyou Portable	Unreleased	Unreleased	October 13, 2011	Unreleased	Idea Factory	Idea Factory
Clover no Kuni no Alice	Unreleased	Unreleased	March 31, 2011	Unreleased	QuinRose	QuinRose
code_18	Unreleased	Unreleased	September 29, 2011	Unreleased	CyberFront	CyberFront
Code Geass: Lelouch of the Rebellion: Lost Colors	Unreleased	Unreleased	March 27, 2008	Unreleased	Crafts & Meister	Bandai Namco Games
Code Lyoko: Quest for Infinity	July 21, 2008	September 26, 2008	Unreleased	Unreleased	Neko Entertainment	The Game Factory
Coded Arms	July 6, 2005	September 9, 2005	June 23, 2005	Unreleased	Konami	Konami
Coded Arms: Contagion	September 18, 2007	March 14, 2008	September 27, 2007	April 9, 2008	Creat Studios	Konami
Coded Soul: Uketsugareshi Idea	Unreleased	Unreleased	February 7, 2008	Unreleased	Gaia	SCEI
Colin McRae Rally 2005	Unreleased	September 1, 2005	June 14, 2007	Unreleased	Six By Nine	Codemasters
Comic Party Portable	Unreleased	Unreleased	December 29, 2005	Unreleased	Aqua Plus	Aqua Plus
The Con	October 18, 2005	March 30, 2007	February 23, 2006	Unreleased	SCEA	SCEA / Ertain / SouthPeak Games / SCEE
Conception: Ore no Kodomo wo Undekure!	Unreleased	Unreleased	April 26, 2012	Unreleased	Chime	Spike Chunsoft
Confidential Money: 300-Hi de 3000-Man Dol Kasegu Houhou	Unreleased	Unreleased	October 4, 2012	Unreleased	Idea Factory	Idea Factory
The Konbini Portable	Unreleased	Unreleased	July 8, 2010	Unreleased	Hamster Corporation	Hamster Corporation
Corpse Party: Blood Covered Repeated Fear	November 22, 2011	December 14, 2011	August 12, 2010	Unreleased	Team GrisGris / 5pb.	5pb. / Xseed Games
Corpse Party: Book of Shadows	January 15, 2013	January 23, 2013	September 1, 2011	Unreleased	Team GrisGris / 5pb.	5pb.
Corpse Party The Anthology: Sachiko's Game of Love Hysteric Birthday 2U	Unreleased	Unreleased	August 2, 2012	Unreleased	5pb.	5pb.
Cover Girl	Unreleased	October 22, 2009	Unreleased	Unreleased	Ubisoft	Ubisoft
Crash of the Titans	October 16, 2007	November 23, 2007	Unreleased	November 22, 2007	SuperVillain Studios	Sierra Entertainment
Crash Tag Team Racing	November 10, 2005	November 25, 2005	December 1, 2005	Unreleased	Radical Entertainment	Vivendi Games
Crash: Mind over Mutant	October 21, 2008	October 31, 2008	Unreleased	October 29, 2008	Radical Entertainment	Activision
Crazy Taxi: Fare Wars	August 7, 2007	September 28, 2007	August 14, 2008	September 27, 2007	Sniper Studios / Black Hole Entertainment	Sega
Cream Stew mo Minagara Iroiro Gochagocha Ittemasu Kedomo... Warai no Tamago L Size	Unreleased	Unreleased	March 23, 2006	Unreleased	Hudson	Hudson
Creature Defense	September 5, 2010	September 3, 2012	September 30, 2010	Unreleased	Hudson Soft	Hudson Soft
Criminal Girls: Invite Only	Unreleased	Unreleased	November 18, 2010	Unreleased	Image Epoch	Nippon Ichi Software
Crimson Empire: Circumstances to Serve a Noble	Unreleased	Unreleased	August 25, 2011	Unreleased	QuinRose	QuinRose
Crimson Gem Saga	May 26, 2009	Unreleased	October 23, 2008	Unreleased	Matrix Software	Atlus
Crimson Room Reverse	Unreleased	Unreleased	December 18, 2008	Unreleased	Takagism Inc.	Success
Crisis Core: Final Fantasy VII	March 25, 2008	June 20, 2008	September 13, 2007	June 19, 2008	Square Enix	Square Enix
Cross Channel: To All People	Unreleased	Unreleased	February 25, 2010	Unreleased	CyberFront	CyberFront
Crush	May 29, 2007	May 25, 2007	Unreleased	May 31, 2007	Zoë Mode	Sega
Crystal Defenders	September 29, 2010	September 29, 2010	September 29, 2010	September 29, 2010	Square Enix	Square Enix
Crystal Mines	Unreleased	January 12, 2011	Unreleased	January 12, 2011	Torus Games	Home Entertainment Suppliers
Cube; Cube: 3D Puzzle Mayhem	April 30, 2007	July 20, 2007	June 28, 2007	Unreleased	Metia Interactive	D3 Publisher
Custom Drive	Unreleased	Unreleased	August 30, 2012	Unreleased	D3 Publisher	D3 Publisher
D.C. Girls Symphony Pocket	Unreleased	Unreleased	June 24, 2010	Unreleased	Idea Factory	Idea Factory
D.C. III: Da Capo III Plus	Unreleased	Unreleased	February 28, 2013	Unreleased	Kadokawa Games	Kadokawa Games
Da Capo I& II Plus Situation Portable	Unreleased	Unreleased	October 28, 2010	Unreleased	Kadokawa Games	Kadokawa Games
Dai-2-Ji Super Robot Taisen Z Hakai-hen	Unreleased	Unreleased	April 14, 2011	Unreleased	B.B. Studio	Bandai Namco Games
Dai-2-Ji Super Robot Taisen Z Saisei-hen	Unreleased	Unreleased	April 5, 2012	Unreleased	B.B. Studio	Bandai Namco Games
Daikoukai Jidai IV: Rota Nova	Unreleased	Unreleased	March 23, 2006	Unreleased	Koei	Koei
Daikuugun	Unreleased	Unreleased	December 10, 2009	Unreleased	Global A	Global A
Daisenryaku Perfect: Senjou no Hasha	Unreleased	Unreleased	June 24, 2010	Unreleased	SystemSoft	SystemSoft
Daisenryaku Portable	Unreleased	Unreleased	December 22, 2005	Unreleased	Genki	Genki
Daisenryaku Portable 2	Unreleased	Unreleased	December 14, 2006	Unreleased	Genki	Genki
Daisenryaku VII: Exceed	Unreleased	Unreleased	May 22, 2008	Unreleased	SystemSoft	SystemSoft
Daisenryaku: Dai Toua Kouboushi - Dainijisekaitaisen Boppatsu - Suujiku Sentai Rengougun Zensekaisen	Unreleased	Unreleased	July 31, 2014	Unreleased	SystemSoft	SystemSoft
Daisenryaku: Dai Toua Kouboushi - Tora Tora Tora Ware Kishuu Ni Seikou Seri	Unreleased	Unreleased	September 25, 2008	Unreleased	SystemSoft	SystemSoft
Daito Giken Koushiki Pachi-Slot Simulator: Hihouden - Fuujirareta Megami Portable	Unreleased	Unreleased	February 24, 2011	Unreleased	Paon Corporation	Paon Corporation
Daito Giken Koushiki Pachi-Slot Simulator: Ossu! Banchou Portable	Unreleased	Unreleased	March 2, 2006	Unreleased	Daito	Daito
Daito Giken Koushiki Pachi-Slot Simulator: Ossu! Misao + Maguro Densetsu Portable	Unreleased	Unreleased	July 1, 2010	Unreleased	SystemSoft	SystemSoft
Daito Giken Koushiki Pachi-Slot Simulator: Yoshimune Portable	Unreleased	Unreleased	June 8, 2006	Unreleased	Daito	Daito
Daiya no Kuni no Alice: Wonderful Mirror World	Unreleased	Unreleased	July 25, 2013	Unreleased	QuinRose	QuinRose
Daiya no Kuni no Alice: Wonderful Wonder World	Unreleased	Unreleased	December 20, 2012	Unreleased	QuinRose	QuinRose
Danball Senki	Unreleased	Unreleased	June 16, 2011	Unreleased	Level 5	Level 5
Danball Senki Boost (Note: Update for Danball Senki.)	Unreleased	Unreleased	November 23, 2011	Unreleased	Level 5	Level 5
Danball Senki W	Unreleased	Unreleased	October 18, 2012	Unreleased	Level-5	Level-5
Danganronpa: Trigger Happy Havoc	Unreleased	Unreleased	November 25, 2010	Unreleased	Spike	Spike
Dango Sanshimai	Unreleased	Unreleased	April 20, 2011	Unreleased	SCEJ	SCEJ
Dante's Inferno	March 1, 2010	February 26, 2010	March 18, 2010	February 25, 2010	Artificial Mind and Movement	Electronic Arts
Danzai no Maria: La Campanella	Unreleased	Unreleased	May 31, 2012	Unreleased	Karin Entertainment	Karin Entertainment
Darius Burst	Unreleased	Unreleased	December 24, 2009	Unreleased	Pyramid	Taito
Darkstalkers Chronicle: The Chaos Tower	March 24, 2005	September 1, 2005	December 12, 2004	Unreleased	Capcom	Capcom
Dave Mirra BMX Challenge	November 2, 2006	June 15, 2007	Unreleased	August 9, 2007	Left Field Productions	Crave Entertainment
Daxter	March 14, 2006	April 13, 2006	Unreleased	April 28, 2006	Ready at Dawn	SCEA / SCEE
Dead End: Orchestral Manoeuvres in the Dead End	Unreleased	Unreleased	September 29, 2011	Unreleased	Alchemist	Alchemist
Dead Head Fred	August 28, 2007	October 26, 2007	March 27, 2008	November 2, 2007	Vicious Cycle Software	D3 Publisher
Dead or Alive Paradise	March 30, 2010	April 1, 2010	April 2, 2010	Unreleased	Team Ninja	Tecmo Koei
Dead to Rights: Reckoning	June 28, 2005	February 3, 2006	Unreleased	Unreleased	Namco	Namco
Dear Drops Distortion	Unreleased	Unreleased	March 10, 2011	Unreleased	CyberFront	CyberFront
Death Connection Portable	Unreleased	Unreleased	February 3, 2011	Unreleased	Idea Factory	Idea Factory
Death Jr.	August 16, 2005	February 10, 2006	Unreleased	Unreleased	Backbone Entertainment	Konami
Death Jr. II: Root of Evil	October 31, 2006	April 27, 2007	Unreleased	May 4, 2007	Backbone Entertainment	Konami
Def Jam Fight for NY: The Takeover	August 10, 2006	September 1, 2006	Unreleased	Unreleased	AKI Corporation	Electronic Arts
Demo Koushin	Unreleased	Unreleased	April 20, 2011	Unreleased	SCEJ	SCEJ
Dengeki no Pilot: Tenkuu no Kizuna	Unreleased	Unreleased	January 28, 2010	Unreleased	Best Media	Best Media
Densetsu no Yuusha no Densetsu: Legendary Saga	Unreleased	Unreleased	February 18, 2010	Unreleased	Kadokawa	Kadokawa
Densha de Go! Pocket Toukaidousen Hen	Unreleased	Unreleased	July 27, 2006	Unreleased	Taito	Taito
Densha de Go! Pocket: Chuuousen Hen	Unreleased	Unreleased	January 19, 2006	Unreleased	Taito	Taito
Densha de Go! Osaka Kanjousen Hen	Unreleased	Unreleased	March 30, 2006	Unreleased	Taito	Taito
Densha de Go! Pocket: Yamanotesen Hen	Unreleased	Unreleased	September 29, 2005	Unreleased	Taito	Taito
Derby Stallion P	Unreleased	Unreleased	July 27, 2006	Unreleased	Enterbrain	Enterbrain
Derby Time	Unreleased	Unreleased	April 21, 2005	Unreleased	SCEI	SCEI
Derby Time 2006	Unreleased	Unreleased	March 2, 2006	Unreleased	SCEI	SCEI
Desert Kingdom Portable	Unreleased	Unreleased	February 21, 2013	Unreleased	Idea Factory	Idea Factory
Desi Adda: Games of India	Unreleased	February 5, 2010	Unreleased	Unreleased	Gameshastra Inc.	Gameshastra Inc.
Despicable Me: The Game	July 6, 2010	October 1, 2010	Unreleased	Unreleased	Vicious Cycle Software	D3 Publisher
Diabolik Lovers	Unreleased	Unreleased	October 11, 2012	Unreleased	Otomate	Idea Factory
Diabolik Lovers: More, Blood	Unreleased	Unreleased	October 24, 2013	Unreleased	Otomate	Otomate
Diabolik: The Original Sin	Unreleased	August 28, 2009	Unreleased	Unreleased	Artematica	Black Bean Games
Dice Dice Fantasia	Unreleased	Unreleased	December 17, 2009	Unreleased	Broccoli	Broccoli
Dies irae: Amantes amentes	Unreleased	Unreleased	June 28, 2012	Unreleased	Views	Views
Digimon Adventure	Unreleased	Unreleased	January 17, 2013	Unreleased	Prope	Namco Bandai Games
Digimon World Re:Digitize	Unreleased	Unreleased	July 19, 2012	Unreleased	Tri-Crescendo	Namco Bandai Games
Diner Dash: Sizzle & Serve	May 22, 2007	May 4, 2007	Unreleased	May 11, 2007	PlayFirst	Eidos Interactive
DiRT 2	September 8, 2009	September 11, 2009	November 5, 2009	Unreleased	Codemasters	Codemasters
Disgaea: Afternoon of Darkness	October 30, 2007	December 14, 2007	November 28, 2006	December 20, 2007	Nippon Ichi Software	Nippon Ichi Software
Disgaea 2: Dark Hero Days	September 8, 2009	February 5, 2010	March 26, 2009	February 18, 2010	Nippon Ichi Software	Nippon Ichi Software
Disgaea Infinite	June 8, 2010	November 17, 2010	November 1, 2009	Unreleased	Nippon Ichi Software	Nippon Ichi Software
Dissidia 012 Final Fantasy	March 22, 2011	March 25, 2011	March 3, 2011	March 25, 2011	Square Enix 1st Production Department	Square Enix
Dissidia Final Fantasy	August 25, 2009	September 4, 2009	November 1, 2009	December 18, 2008	Square Enix	Square Enix
DJ Max Fever	January 27, 2009	Unreleased	Unreleased	Unreleased	Pentavision	PM Studios
DJ Max Portable	Unreleased	Unreleased	January 20, 2006	Unreleased	Pentavision	PM Studios
DJ Max Portable 2	Unreleased	Unreleased	February 23, 2007	Unreleased	Pentavision	PM Studios
DJMax Portable 3	October 14, 2010	Unreleased	February 17, 2011	Unreleased	Pentavision	CyberFront / PM Studios
DJ Max Portable Hot Tunes	Unreleased	Unreleased	June 12, 2010	Unreleased	Pentavision	PM Studios
DJMax Portable: Black Square	October 14, 2010	Unreleased	February 17, 2011	Unreleased	Pentavision	CyberFront / PM Studios
DJ Max Portable: Clazziquai Edition	Unreleased	Unreleased	October 16, 2008	Unreleased	Pentavision	PM Studios
The Dog: Happy Life	Unreleased	Unreleased	April 27, 2006	Unreleased	Yuke's	Yuke's
DokiSui: DokiDoki Suikoden	Unreleased	Unreleased	May 12, 2011	Unreleased	Silicon Studio	Irem
The Doko Demo Gal Mahjong	Unreleased	Unreleased	October 26, 2006	Unreleased	HuneX	D3 Publisher
Doko Demo Issho	Unreleased	Unreleased	December 12, 2004	Unreleased	Sony Computer Entertainment	Sony Computer Entertainment
Doko Demo Issho: Let's Gakkou!	Unreleased	Unreleased	June 12, 2006	Unreleased	SCEI	SCEI
The Doko Demo Kanji Quiz - Challenge! Kanji Kentei 2006	Unreleased	Unreleased	August 24, 2006	Unreleased	Vingt-et-un Systems	D3 Publisher
The Doko Demo Suiri	Unreleased	Unreleased	April 27, 2006	Unreleased	Tomcat System	D3 Publisher
Donkey Xote	Unreleased	November 14, 2008	Unreleased	Unreleased	Revistronic	V.2 Play
DoraSlot: Bakuenchi! Kyoujin no Hoshi II	Unreleased	Unreleased	July 28, 2005	Unreleased	Dorart	Dorart
DoraSlot: Hana Hana Matsuri Da!!	Unreleased	Unreleased	June 25, 2009	Unreleased	Dorart	Dorart
DoraSlot: Oki-Slot-Ou! Pioneer 12	Unreleased	Unreleased	February 23, 2006	Unreleased	Dorart	Dorart
DoraSlot: Shuyaku wa Zenigata	Unreleased	Unreleased	April 28, 2005	Unreleased	Dorart	Dorart
Dot Defense	Unreleased	Unreleased	September 22, 2010	Unreleased	System Prisma	System Prisma
Double Cast	Unreleased	Unreleased	July 28, 2005	Unreleased	Sugar & Rockets	SCEI
Downstream Panic!	February 5, 2008	Unreleased	Unreleased	April 11, 2008	EKO Software	Eko System
Dragon Ball Z: Shin Budokai	March 7, 2006	May 25, 2006	April 20, 2006	Unreleased	Dimps	Atari
Dragon Ball Z: Shin Budokai - Another Road; Dragon Ball Z: Shin Budokai 2	March 20, 2007	June 22, 2007	June 6, 2007	June 29, 2007	Dimps	Atari
Dragon Quest & Final Fantasy in Itadaki Street Portable	Unreleased	Unreleased	May 25, 2006	Unreleased	Think Garage	Square Enix
Dragonball Evolution	April 8, 2009	April 17, 2009	March 19, 2009	Unreleased	Dimps	Namco Bandai Games
Dragon Ball Z: Tenkaichi Tag Team	October 19, 2010	October 22, 2010	September 30, 2010	October 28, 2010	Spike	Bandai Namco Games
Dragon Dance	Unreleased	Unreleased	February 26, 2009	Unreleased	Spike	Spike
Dragon's Lair	March 28, 2011	April 18, 2012	Unreleased	April 18, 2012	United Coders	Digital Leisure
Dragoneer's Aria	August 21, 2007	February 15, 2008	August 23, 2007	February 21, 2008	Hitmaker	NIS / Koei
Dream C Club Portable	Unreleased	Unreleased	October 28, 2010	Unreleased	Hitmaker	NIS / Koei
Driver 76	May 8, 2007	May 11, 2007	Unreleased	Unreleased	Sumo Digital	Ubisoft
DT Carnage	April 21, 2009	Unreleased	Unreleased	Unreleased	Axis Entertainment	Agetec
Dunamis 15	Unreleased	Unreleased	July 26, 2012	Unreleased	5pb	5pb
Dungeon Explorer: Warriors of Ancient Arts	February 15, 2008	March 28, 2008	Unreleased	November 15, 2007	Hudson Soft	Hudson Soft
Dungeon Maker: Hunting Ground	June 19, 2007	Unreleased	September 28, 2006	Unreleased	Global A Entertainment	Xseed Games
Dungeon Maker II: The Hidden War	December 9, 2008	Unreleased	December 6, 2007	Unreleased	Global A Entertainment	UFO Interactive Games
Dungeon Siege: Throne of Agony	October 30, 2006	February 2, 2007	Unreleased	February 2, 2007	SuperVillain Studios	2K Games
Dungeon Travelers 2: Ouritsu Tokoshan to Manono no Fuuin	Unreleased	Unreleased	March 28, 2013	Unreleased	Aqua Plus	Aqua Plus
Dungeons & Dragons Tactics	August 14, 2007	September 14, 2007	Unreleased	August 24, 2007	Kuju Entertainment	Atari
Durarara!! 3-way Standoff	Unreleased	Unreleased	September 22, 2010	Unreleased	Kadokawa Games	ASCII Media Works
Durarara!! 3way Standoff: Alley (Note: Update for Durarara!! 3-way Standoff.)	Unreleased	Unreleased	August 25, 2011	Unreleased	Kadokawa Games	ASCII Media Works
Dynasty Warriors	March 24, 2005	September 1, 2005	December 16, 2004	October 7, 2005	Omega Force	Koei
Dynasty Warriors Vol. 2	October 24, 2006	November 17, 2006	March 23, 2006	November 30, 2006	Omega Force	Koei
Dynasty Warriors: Strikeforce	April 28, 2009	May 1, 2009	February 26, 2009	May 7, 2009	Omega Force	Koei
E'tude Prologue: Yureugoku Kokoro no Katachi Portable	Unreleased	Unreleased	June 28, 2007	Unreleased	Takuyo	Takuyo
EA Replay	November 14, 2006	March 16, 2007	Unreleased	Unreleased	EA Canada	Electronic Arts
Earth Saver Plus: Inseki Bakuha Daisakusen	Unreleased	Unreleased	April 15, 2010	Unreleased	Tom Create	Tom Create
EbiKore+ Amagami	Unreleased	Unreleased	March 31, 2011	Unreleased	Enterbrain	Kadokawa Games
Echochrome	May 1, 2008	July 4, 2008	March 19, 2008	July 17, 2008	Japan Studio	SCEI / SCEA / SCEE
Echoshift	February 25, 2010	February 25, 2010	November 1, 2009	Unreleased	Artoon	SCEI / SCEA / SCEE
Eien no Aselia: Kono Daichi no Hate de	Unreleased	Unreleased	March 8, 2012	Unreleased	Xuse	CyberFront
Eikoku Tantei Mysteria	Unreleased	Unreleased	March 7, 2013	Unreleased	Karin Entertainment	Karin Entertainment
Elkrone no Atelier: Dear for Otomate	Unreleased	Unreleased	April 12, 2012	Unreleased	Otomate	Idea Factory
Elminage Gothic: Ritual of Darkness and Ulm Zakir	Unreleased	Unreleased	May 24, 2012	Unreleased	Starfish-SD	Starfish-SD
Elminage Ibun: Ame no Mihashira	Unreleased	Unreleased	September 13, 2012	Unreleased	Starfish-SD	Starfish-SD
Elminage II: Sousei no Megami to Unmei no Daichi	Unreleased	Unreleased	October 29, 2009	Unreleased	Opera House	Opera House
Elminage III: Ankoku no Shito to Taiyou no Kyuuden	Unreleased	Unreleased	August 4, 2011	Unreleased	Opera House	Starfish SD
Elminage Original	November 20, 2012	Unreleased	May 19, 2011	Unreleased	Starfish-SD	Starfish-SD
End of Serenity	June 24, 2014	August 27, 2014	October 29, 2013	August 27, 2014	WorldWide Software	WorldWide Software
Enkaku Sōsa: Shinjitsu he no 23 Nichikan	Unreleased	Unreleased	February 5, 2009	Unreleased	Media.Vision	SCEI
Enkeltbillet	Unreleased	Unreleased	July 31, 2014	Unreleased	Otomate	Idea Factory
Entaku no Seito: The Eternal Legend	Unreleased	Unreleased	October 4, 2012	Unreleased	Experience Inc.	Kadokawa
Eternal Etude: Canvas 4	Unreleased	Unreleased	November 23, 2011	Unreleased	GN Software	GN Software
Koukyoushihen Eureka Seven	Unreleased	Unreleased	April 6, 2006	Unreleased	Bandai Namco Games	Bandai Namco Games
Eragon	November 14, 2006	November 24, 2006	Unreleased	Unreleased	Amaze Entertainment	Vivendi Games
Evangelion Shin Gekijoban: 3nd Impact	Unreleased	Unreleased	September 29, 2011	Unreleased	Bandai Namco Games	Bandai Namco Games
Evangelion Jo	Unreleased	Unreleased	June 4, 2009	Unreleased	Bandai Namco Games	Bandai Namco Games
Ever17: The Out of Infinity Premium Edition	Unreleased	Unreleased	March 12, 2009	Unreleased	CyberFront	CyberFront
Every Extend Extra	November 7, 2006	February 9, 2007	Unreleased	August 3, 2006	Q Entertainment	Namco Bandai Games / Buena Vista Games
Everybody's Golf Portable; Hot Shots Golf: Open Tee	May 3, 2005	September 1, 2005	December 12, 2004	Unreleased	Clap Hanz	SCEI / SCEA / SCEE
Everybody's Golf Portable 2 Hot Shots Golf: Open Tee 2	June 3, 2008	June 6, 2008	December 6, 2007	Unreleased	Clap Hanz	SCEI / SCEA / SCEE
Everybody's Tennis Portable; Hot Shots Tennis: Get a Grip	June 29, 2010	April 30, 2010	February 25, 2010	Unreleased	Clap Hanz	SCEI / SCEA / SCEE
Everyday Shooter	December 4, 2008	January 22, 2009	June 1, 2009	Unreleased	Backbone Entertainment	SCEA
Exit	February 14, 2006	March 31, 2006	December 15, 2005	March 30, 2006	Taito	Taito / Ubisoft
Exit 2	Unreleased	March 23, 2007	Unreleased	September 7, 2006	Taito	Taito / 505 Games
The Eye of Judgment: Legends; The Eye of Judgment: Shintaku no Wizard	March 10, 2010	March 11, 2010	March 4, 2010	Unreleased	SCEI	SCEI / SCEE / SCEA
EyePet	November 2, 2010	November 19, 2010	Unreleased	Unreleased	Taito	Taito / 505 Games
EyePet Adventures	Unreleased	November 11, 2011	Unreleased	November 17, 2011	SCEE London Studio	SCEE
Eyeshield 21: Portable Edition	Unreleased	Unreleased	March 2, 2006	Unreleased	WinkySoft	Konami
F1 2009	November 16, 2009	November 20, 2009	Unreleased	Unreleased	Sumo Digital	Codemasters
F1 Grand Prix	Unreleased	September 1, 2005	September 22, 2005	Unreleased	Studio Liverpool	SCEE / SCEI
Fading Shadows	July 3, 2008	March 7, 2008	July 6, 2011	Unreleased	Ivolgamus	Agetec
FairlyLife: MiracleDays	Unreleased	Unreleased	February 25, 2010	Unreleased	Piacci	Piacci
Fairy Tail: Portable Guild	Unreleased	Unreleased	June 3, 2010	Unreleased	Konami	Konami
Fairy Tail: Portable Guild 2	Unreleased	Unreleased	March 10, 2011	Unreleased	Konami	Konami
Fairy Tail: Zeref Awakens	Unreleased	Unreleased	March 22, 2012	Unreleased	Konami	Konami
Family Guy Video Game!	October 17, 2006	December 1, 2006	Unreleased	Unreleased	High Voltage Software	2K Games
The Fast and the Furious, 2006	April 24, 2007	October 26, 2007	Unreleased	March 2008	Eutechnyx	Namco Bandai Games
Fate/Extra	November 21, 2011	May 4, 2012	July 22, 2010	Unreleased	Image Epoch	Marvelous Entertainment / Aksys Games
Fate/Extra CCC	Unreleased	Unreleased	March 28, 2013	Unreleased	Image Epoch	Marvelous AQL
Fat Princess: Fistful of Cake	May 4, 2010	March 12, 2010	Unreleased	March 11, 2010	SuperVillain Studios	Sony Computer Entertainment
Fate/Tiger Colosseum	Unreleased	Unreleased	September 13, 2007	Unreleased	Cavia Inc.	Capcom
Fate/Tiger Colosseum Upper	Unreleased	Unreleased	August 28, 2008	Unreleased	Cavia Inc.	Capcom
Fate/Unlimited Codes	September 3, 2009	Unreleased	June 18, 2009	Unreleased	Eighting	Capcom
Field Commander	May 23, 2006	July 28, 2006	Unreleased	July 22, 2006	Sony Online Entertainment	Sony Online Entertainment
FIFA 06	October 11, 2005	October 21, 2005	Unreleased	December 22, 2005	EA Canada	EA Sports
FIFA 07	October 17, 2006	September 29, 2006	September 25, 2006	January 18, 2007	EA Canada	EA Sports
FIFA 08	October 8, 2007	September 28, 2007	Unreleased	September 27, 2007	EA Canada	EA Sports
FIFA 09	October 13, 2008	October 3, 2008	Unreleased	December 8, 2008	EA Canada	EA Sports
FIFA 10	October 20, 2009	October 2, 2009	Unreleased	October 22, 2009	EA Canada	EA Sports
FIFA 11	September 28, 2010	September 30, 2010	September 30, 2010	September 30, 2010	EA Canada	EA Sports
FIFA 12	September 27, 2011	September 30, 2011	October 22, 2011	September 29, 2011	EA Canada	EA Sports
FIFA 13	September 25, 2012	September 28, 2012	October 18, 2012	September 27, 2012	EA Sports	EA Sports
FIFA 14	Unreleased	Unreleased	October 17, 2013	September 26, 2013	EA Sports	EA Sports
FIFA Soccer	April 25, 2005	Unreleased	Unreleased	Unreleased	EA Canada	EA Sports
FIFA Street 2	February 28, 2006	March 3, 2006	March 3, 2006	Unreleased	EA Canada	EA Sports BIG
Fight Night Round 3	February 20, 2006	March 9, 2006	Unreleased	March 17, 2006	Team Fusion	EA Sports
Final Armada	Unreleased	August 17, 2007	Unreleased	Unreleased	I-Imagine	Virgin Play
Fight Ippatsu! Juden-Chan!! CC	Unreleased	Unreleased	May 27, 2010	Unreleased	Russel	Russel
Final Approach 2: 1st Priority Portable	Unreleased	Unreleased	April 30, 2009	Unreleased	Princess Soft	Princess Soft
Final Fantasy	June 26, 2007	February 8, 2008	Unreleased	April 19, 2007	Square Enix	Square Enix
Final Fantasy II	July 24, 2007	February 8, 2008	June 7, 2007	February 28, 2008	Square Enix	Square Enix
Final Fantasy III	September 25, 2012	Unreleased	September 20, 2012	Unreleased	Square Enix	Square Enix
Final Fantasy IV: The Complete Collection	April 19, 2011	April 21, 2011	March 24, 2011	Unreleased	Square Enix	Square Enix
Final Fantasy Tactics: The War of the Lions	October 9, 2007	October 5, 2007	May 10, 2007	October 8, 2007	Square Enix	Square Enix
Final Fantasy Type-0	Unreleased	Unreleased	October 27, 2011	Unreleased	Square Enix 1st Production Department	Square Enix
Finder Love: Hara Fumina - Futari no Futari de...	Unreleased	Unreleased	June 29, 2006	Unreleased	Capcom	Capcom
Finder Love: Hoshino Aki - Nangoku Trouble Rendezvous	Unreleased	Unreleased	June 29, 2006	Unreleased	Capcom	Capcom
Finder Love: Kudou Risa - First Shoot wa Kimi to	Unreleased	Unreleased	June 29, 2006	Unreleased	Capcom	Capcom
Fired Up	Unreleased	September 1, 2005	Unreleased	Unreleased	London Studio	SCEE
Flash Motor Karen	Unreleased	Unreleased	February 18, 2010	Unreleased	Hopemoon	Hopemoon
FlatOut: Head On	April 4, 2008	March 14, 2008	Unreleased	Unreleased	Six By Nine	Empire Interactive
flOw	March 6, 2008	April 24, 2008	April 24, 2008	April 24, 2008	SuperVillain Studios	SCEA
Flowars	Unreleased	Unreleased	December 30, 2005	Unreleased	MBO	MBO
Flowers	Unreleased	Unreleased	October 9, 2014	Unreleased	Prototype	Prototype
Flowers: Natsu-Hen	Unreleased	Unreleased	October 22, 2015	Unreleased	Prototype	Prototype
Football Manager Handheld	Unreleased	April 13, 2006	Unreleased	Unreleased	Sports Interactive	Sega
Football Manager Handheld 2007	Unreleased	December 1, 2006	Unreleased	Unreleased	Sports Interactive	Sega
Football Manager Handheld 2008	Unreleased	November 30, 2007	Unreleased	November 29, 2007	Sports Interactive	Sega
Football Manager Handheld 2009	Unreleased	November 14, 2008	Unreleased	November 13, 2008	Sports Interactive	Sega
Football Manager Handheld 2010	Unreleased	October 30, 2009	Unreleased	October 22, 2009	Sports Interactive	Sega
Football Manager Handheld 2011	Unreleased	November 26, 2010	Unreleased	November 26, 2010	Sports Interactive	Sega
Football Manager Handheld 2012	Unreleased	October 28, 2011	Unreleased	November 9, 2011	Sports Interactive	Sega Europe
Football Manager Handheld 2013	Unreleased	November 30, 2012	Unreleased	Unreleased	Sports Interactive	Sega Europe
For Symphony: With All One's Heart Portable	Unreleased	Unreleased	July 26, 2007	Unreleased	Takuyo	Takuyo
Ford Bold Moves Street Racing	October 17, 2006	November 10, 2006	Unreleased	March 29, 2007	Razorworks	Eidos / Xplosiv
Ford Racing: Off Road; Off Road	September 23, 2008	March 20, 2008	Unreleased	Unreleased	Razorworks	Empire Interactive
Formula One 06	Unreleased	July 28, 2006	December 28, 2006	Unreleased	Studio Liverpool	SCEE / SCEI
Frantix	September 19, 2005	December 2, 2005	February 23, 2006	Unreleased	Killer Game	Sony Platform Publishing / SOE / Ubisoft
Freak Out: Extreme Freeride	Unreleased	October 26, 2007	Unreleased	May 2007	ColdWood Interactive	JoWooD Productions
Free Running	Unreleased	April 20, 2007	April 5, 2007	Unreleased	Core Design	Eidos Interactive
Frogger: Helmet Chaos	September 29, 2005	February 17, 2006	Unreleased	Unreleased	Konami	Konami
From Russia With Love	April 3, 2006	April 13, 2006	May 11, 2006	Unreleased	Rebellion Developments	Electronic Arts
Frontier Gate	Unreleased	Unreleased	December 22, 2011	Unreleased	tri-Ace	Konami
Frontier Gate Boost+ (Note: Update for Frontier Gate.)	Unreleased	Unreleased	March 14, 2013	Unreleased	tri-Ace	Konami
Fukufuku no Shima	Unreleased	Unreleased	November 10, 2005	Unreleased	MuuMuu	SCEE / SCEI
Full Auto 2: Battlelines	March 20, 2007	March 30, 2007	Unreleased	March 29, 2007	Deep Fried Entertainment	Sega
Fushigi no Dungeon: Fuurai no Shiren 3 Portable	Unreleased	Unreleased	January 28, 2010	Unreleased	Spike	Spike
Fushigi no Dungeon: Fuurai no Shiren 4 Plus - Kami no Hitomi to Akuma no Heso	Unreleased	Unreleased	October 18, 2012	Unreleased	Spike Chunsoft	Spike Chunsoft
Fushigi no Kuni no Bouken Sakaba Portable	Unreleased	Unreleased	July 12, 2011	Unreleased	RideonJapan, Inc.	RideonJapan, Inc.
Fushigi Yuugi: Genbu Kaiden Gaiden - Kagami no Miko	Unreleased	Unreleased	September 28, 2006	Unreleased	Spike	Spike
Fuuun Shinsengumi Bakumatsuden Portable	Unreleased	Unreleased	December 10, 2009	Unreleased	FromSoftware	FromSoftware
G-Force	July 21, 2009	July 31, 2009	Unreleased	Unreleased	Eurocom	Disney Interactive Studios
G.I. Joe: The Rise of Cobra	August 4, 2009	August 14, 2009	Unreleased	Unreleased	Electronic Arts	Electronic Arts
GA - Geijutsuka Art Design Class: Slapstick Wonder Land	Unreleased	Unreleased	July 29, 2010	Unreleased	Russel	Russel
GachiTora! Abarenbou Kyoushi in High School	Unreleased	Unreleased	April 21, 2011	Unreleased	Spike	Spike
Gaku * Ou: The Royal Seven Stars + Meteor	Unreleased	Unreleased	March 28, 2013	Unreleased	Alchemist	Alchemist
Gakuen Heaven 2: Double Scramble	Unreleased	Unreleased	April 23, 2015	Unreleased	Prototype	Prototype
Gakuen Heaven: Boy's Love Scramble!	Unreleased	Unreleased	November 26, 2009	Unreleased	Prototype	Prototype
Gakuen Heaven: Okawari! Boy's Love Attack	Unreleased	Unreleased	February 10, 2011	Unreleased	Prototype	Prototype
Gakuen Hetalia Portable	Unreleased	Unreleased	March 24, 2011	Unreleased	Otomate	Idea Factory
Gakuen K: Wonderful School Days	Unreleased	Unreleased	October 30, 2014	Unreleased	Otomate	Idea Factory
Gallery Fake	Unreleased	Unreleased	September 29, 2005	Unreleased	Bandai	Bandai
Game demo, Papa no lukoto o Kikinasai!	Unreleased	Unreleased	April 26, 2012	Unreleased	Bandai Namco Games	Bandai Namco Games
Gangs of London	October 3, 2006	September 1, 2006	Unreleased	September 7, 2006	Team Soho	SCEE / SCEA
Garnet Cradle Portable: Kagi no Himiko	Unreleased	Unreleased	April 7, 2011	Unreleased	Otomate	Idea Factory
Gekiatsu!! Pachi Game Tamashi Vol.1: CR Evangelion - Shinjitsu no Tsubasa	Unreleased	Unreleased	June 9, 2011	Unreleased	Fields	Fields
Gekka Ryouran Romance	Unreleased	Unreleased	September 15, 2011	Unreleased	Idea Factory	Idea Factory
Gendai Daisenryaku: Isshoku Sokuhatsu - Gunji Balance Houkai	Unreleased	Unreleased	August 27, 2009	Unreleased	SystemSoft	SystemSoft
Generation of Chaos; New Demon World: GOCIV Another Side	February 28, 2006	September 14, 2007	March 31, 2005	September 27, 2007	Idea Factory	Nippon Ichi Software
Generation of Chaos: Pandora's Reflection; Generation of Chaos 6	February 19, 2013	February 20, 2013	June 28, 2012	Unreleased	Super Sting	Idea Factory / Nippon Ichi Software
Genroh	Unreleased	Unreleased	August 30, 2012	Unreleased	Idea Factory	Idea Factory
Gensō Suikoden I & II	Unreleased	Unreleased	February 23, 2006	Unreleased	Konami	Konami
Gensō Suikoden: Tsumugareshi Hyakunen no Toki	Unreleased	Unreleased	February 9, 2012	Unreleased	Konami	Konami
Geronimo Stilton in the Kingdom of Fantasy	July 16, 2013	November 4, 2011	November 3, 2011	Unreleased	Virtual Toys	SCEE
Geronimo Stilton: Return to the Kingdom of Fantasy	July 16, 2013	October 31, 2012	Unreleased	Unreleased	Virtual Toys	SCEE
Geten no Hana	Unreleased	Unreleased	March 28, 2013	Unreleased	Koei Tecmo Games	Koei Tecmo Games
Geten no Hana: Yume Akari	Unreleased	Unreleased	February 27, 2014	Unreleased	Koei Tecmo Games	Koei Tecmo Games
Getsuei no Kusari: Kouran Moratorium	Unreleased	Unreleased	December 19, 2013	Unreleased	Takuyo	Takuyo
Getsuei no Kusari: Sakuran Paranoia	Unreleased	Unreleased	April 18, 2013	Unreleased	Takuyo	Takuyo
Ghost in the Shell: Stand Alone Complex	October 26, 2005	October 21, 2005	September 15, 2005	Unreleased	G-artists	SCEI / Atari / Bandai
Ghost Rider	February 13, 2007	February 23, 2007	Unreleased	February 16, 2007	Climax Group	2K Games
Ghostbusters: The Video Game	October 30, 2009	November 6, 2009	Unreleased	November 12, 2009	Terminal Reality	Atari
Gift: Prism	Unreleased	Unreleased	February 2, 2012	Unreleased	Moonstone	CyberFront
Ginga Ojousama Densetsu Collection	Unreleased	Unreleased	July 31, 2008	Unreleased	Hudson Soft	Hudson Soft
Ginsei Igo Portable	Unreleased	Unreleased	May 20, 2010	Unreleased	SilverStar	SilverStar
Ginsei Shogi Portable	Unreleased	Unreleased	February 18, 2010	Unreleased	SilverStar	SilverStar
Ginsei Shogi Portable: Fuuun Ryuuko Raiden	Unreleased	Unreleased	August 4, 2011	Unreleased	SilverStar	SilverStar
Ginsei Tsume Shogi Portable	Unreleased	Unreleased	July 6, 2011	Unreleased	SilverStar	SilverStar
Gintama no Sugoroku	Unreleased	Unreleased	January 24, 2013	Unreleased	Namco Bandai Games	Namco Bandai Games
Gitaroo Man Lives!	November 14, 2006	September 29, 2006	June 8, 2006	Unreleased	iNiS	Koei
Gladiator Begins	September 13, 2010	May 27, 2011	January 14, 2010	Unreleased	Goshow	Aksys Games
Glass Heart Princess	Unreleased	Unreleased	December 20, 2012	Unreleased	Otomate	Idea Factory
Glass Heart Princess Platinum	Unreleased	Unreleased	November 7, 2013	Unreleased	Otomate	Idea Factory
Glorace: Phantastic Carnival	Unreleased	Unreleased	May 2, 2005	Unreleased	SCEA	SCEA
Gloria Union: Twin Fates in Blue Ocean	Unreleased	Unreleased	June 23, 2011	Unreleased	Sting Entertainment	Atlus
Go! Sudoku	March 21, 2006	December 2, 2005	April 27, 2006	Unreleased	Sumo Digital	Ubisoft
Go! Puzzle	November 20, 2007	November 20, 2007	Unreleased	February 7, 2008	Zoonami Ltd.	SCEA
God Eater	Unreleased	Unreleased	February 4, 2010	Unreleased	Shift/ Namco Bandai	Bandai Namco Games
God Eater 2	Unreleased	Unreleased	November 14, 2013	Unreleased	Shift/ Namco Bandai	Bandai Namco Games
Gods Eater Burst (Note: Update for God Eater.)	March 15, 2011	March 18, 2011	October 28, 2010	Unreleased	Shift/ Namco Bandai	D3 Publisher
Goku Makai-Mura Kai (Note: Update for Ultimate Ghosts'n Goblins.)	Unreleased	Unreleased	August 2, 2007	Unreleased	TOSE	Capcom
God of War: Chains of Olympus	March 4, 2008	March 28, 2008	March 27, 2008	July 10, 2008	Ready at Dawn	SCEA / SCEE / SCEI
God of War: Ghost of Sparta	November 2, 2010	November 3, 2010	November 11, 2010	November 4, 2010	Ready at Dawn	SCEA / SCEE / SCEI
The Godfather: Mob Wars	September 19, 2006	September 22, 2006	Unreleased	September 21, 2006	Page 44 Studios	Electronic Arts
The Golden Compass	December 4, 2007	December 14, 2007	Unreleased	December 20, 2007	Shiny Entertainment	Sega
Gradius Collection	June 6, 2006	September 15, 2006	February 9, 2006	October 6, 2006	Konami	Konami
Gran Turismo	October 1, 2009	October 1, 2009	October 1, 2009	October 1, 2009	Polyphony Digital	SCEA / SCEE / SCEI
Grand Knights History	Unreleased	Unreleased	September 11, 2011	Unreleased	Vanillaware	Marvelous Entertainment
Grand Theft Auto: Chinatown Wars	October 20, 2009	October 23, 2009	March 11, 2010	October 28, 2009	Rockstar Leeds / Rockstar North	Rockstar Games
Grand Theft Auto: Liberty City Stories	October 24, 2005	October 28, 2005	July 26, 2007	December 2, 2005	Rockstar Leeds / Rockstar North	Rockstar Games / Capcom
Grand Theft Auto: Vice City Stories	October 31, 2006	November 3, 2006	December 6, 2007	November 10, 2006	Rockstar Leeds / Rockstar North	Rockstar Games / Capcom
Gravity Crash	July 20, 2010	July 21, 2010	August 26, 2010	July 21, 2010	Zoonami Ltd.	SCEA
Great Battle Fullblast	Unreleased	Unreleased	March 1, 2012	Unreleased	Inti-Creates	Namco Bandai Games
Gretzky NHL	March 24, 2005	Unreleased	Unreleased	Unreleased	989 Studios	SCEA
Gretzky NHL 2006	October 4, 2005	Unreleased	Unreleased	Unreleased	989 Studios	SCEA
Grim the Bounty Hunter	Unreleased	Unreleased	July 26, 2012	Unreleased	QuinRose	QuinRose
GripShift	September 12, 2005	November 18, 2005	February 23, 2006	Unreleased	Sidhe Interactive	Sony Platform Publishing
Grisara no Kajitsu: Le Fruit de la Grisara	Unreleased	Unreleased	February 21, 2013	Unreleased	Prototype	Prototype
Grisara no Meikyuu: Le Labyrinthe de la Grisara	Unreleased	Unreleased	October 30, 2014	Unreleased	Prototype	Prototype
Grisara no Rakuen: Le Eden de la Grisara	Unreleased	Unreleased	December 11, 2014	Unreleased	Prototype	Prototype
Groovin' Blocks	July 12, 2010	Unreleased	Unreleased	Unreleased	Zoonami Ltd.	SCEA
Growlanser	Unreleased	Unreleased	May 14, 2009	Unreleased	Career Soft	Atlus
Growlanser IV: Wayfarer of Time	July 31, 2012	Unreleased	June 18, 2011	Unreleased	Career Soft	Atlus
GTI Club Supermini Festa!	April 22, 2010	Unreleased	February 25, 2010	Unreleased	Konami	Konami
Guilty Gear Judgement	September 5, 2006	August 3, 2007	August 24, 2006	August 23, 2007	Arc System Works	Arc System Works / Majesco
Guilty Gear XX#Reload	Unreleased	Unreleased	September 29, 2005	Unreleased	Arc System Works	Arc System Works / Aksys Games
Guilty Gear XX Accent Core Plus (Note: Update for Guilty Gear XX#Reload.)	April 7, 2009	May 20, 2011	July 24, 2008	Unreleased	Arc System Works	Arc System Works / Aksys Games
Gundam Assault Survive	Unreleased	Unreleased	March 18, 2010	Unreleased	Bec	Bandai Namco Games
Gundam Battle Chronicle	Unreleased	Unreleased	October 4, 2007	Unreleased	Artdink	Bandai Namco Games
Gundam Battle Royale	Unreleased	Unreleased	October 5, 2006	Unreleased	Artdink	Bandai Namco Games
Gundam Battle Tactics	Unreleased	Unreleased	September 22, 2005	Unreleased	Artdink	Bandai Namco Games
Gundam Battle Universe	Unreleased	Unreleased	July 17, 2008	Unreleased	Bandai Namco Games	Bandai Namco Games
Gundam Memories Tatakai no Kioku	Unreleased	Unreleased	June 23, 2011	Unreleased	Bandai Namco Games	Bandai Namco Games
Gundam Seed: Rengou vs. Z.A.F.T. Portable	Unreleased	Unreleased	April 5, 2007	Unreleased	Capcom	Capcom
Gun Showdown	October 10, 2006	November 13, 2006	Unreleased	November 15, 2006	Neversoft	Activision
Gungnir	June 12, 2012	Unreleased	May 19, 2011	Unreleased	Sting Entertainment	Atlus
Gunpey	November 17, 2006	March 30, 2007	January 11, 2007	April 13, 2007	Q Entertainment	Namco Bandai Games / Atari
Gurumin: A Monstrous Adventure	February 12, 2007	Unreleased	June 29, 2006	Unreleased	Nihon Falcom	Falcom / Mastiff / 505 Games
Hagane no Renkinjutsushi: Fullmetal Alchemist - Yakusoku no Hi e	Unreleased	Unreleased	May 20, 2010	Unreleased	Crafts & Meister	Bandai Namco Games
Hagane no Renkinjutsushi: Senaka o Takuseshimono	Unreleased	Unreleased	July 1, 2010	Unreleased	Crafts & Meister	Bandai Namco Games
Hajime no Ippo Portable: Victorious Spirits	Unreleased	Unreleased	December 20, 2007	Unreleased	ESP Software	Grandprix Inc.
Hakuisei Renai Shoukougun	Unreleased	Unreleased	September 29, 2011	Unreleased	Kogado Studio	CyberFront
Hakuisei Renai Shoukougun: RE:Therapy (Note: Update for Hakuisei Renai Shoukougun.)	Unreleased	Unreleased	June 28, 2012	Unreleased	CyberFront	CyberFront
Hakuoki: Warriors of the Shinsengumi	February 19, 2013	Unreleased	March 22, 2012	Unreleased	Idea Factory	Idea Factory / Aksys Games
Hakuoki: Demon of the Fleeting Blossom	February 14, 2012	Unreleased	August 27, 2009	Unreleased	Idea Factory	Idea Factory / Aksys Games
Hakuoki: Reimeiroku Portable	Unreleased	Unreleased	July 28, 2011	Unreleased	Idea Factory	Idea Factory
Hakuoki: Yugiroku	Unreleased	Unreleased	May 13, 2010	Unreleased	Idea Factory	Idea Factory
Hakuoki: Yugiroku Ni - Matsuri Hayashi to Taishitachi	Unreleased	Unreleased	October 18, 2012	Unreleased	Idea Factory	Idea Factory
Hakuoki: Zuisoroku Portable	Unreleased	Unreleased	August 26, 2010	Unreleased	Idea Factory	Idea Factory
Half-Minute Hero	October 13, 2009	February 19, 2010	May 28, 2009	April 8, 2010	Opus	Marvelous Entertainment / Xseed Games
Hammerin' Hero	April 7, 2009	March 26, 2010	May 15, 2008	Unreleased	Irem	Atlus
Hana to Otome ni Shukufuku o: Harukaze no Okurimono Portable	Unreleased	Unreleased	October 27, 2011	Unreleased	Boost On	Boost On
Hanakisou	Unreleased	Unreleased	August 12, 2010	Unreleased	Prototype	Prototype
Hanaoni: Koisomeru Meru - Eikyuu no Shirushi	Unreleased	Unreleased	March 17, 2011	Unreleased	Otomate	Idea Factory
Hanaoni: Yume no Tsudzuki	Unreleased	Unreleased	March 22, 2012	Unreleased	Otomate	Idea Factory
Hanasaku Manimani	Unreleased	Unreleased	November 21, 2013	Unreleased	5pb	5pb
Hanayaka Nari, Waga Ichizoku	Unreleased	Unreleased	July 1, 2010	Unreleased	Vingt-et-un Systems	Idea Factory
Hanayaka Nari, Waga Ichizoku: Kinema Mosaic	Unreleased	Unreleased	December 8, 2011	Unreleased	Vingt-et-un Systems	Idea Factory
Hanayaka Nari, Waga Ichizoku: Tasogare Polarstar	Unreleased	Unreleased	July 11, 2013	Unreleased	Otomate	Idea Factory
Hannah Montana: Rock Out the Show	August 4, 2009	October 23, 2009	Unreleased	November 12, 2009	Page 44 Studios	Disney Interactive Studios
Hannspree Ten Kate Honda: SBK Superbike World Championship	March 18, 2008	June 29, 2007	Unreleased	Unreleased	Milestone srl	Valcon Games
Harakuju Tantei Gakuen: Steel Wood	Unreleased	Unreleased	April 22, 2010	Unreleased	Idea Factory	Idea Factory
Hard Rock Casino	April 24, 2007	February 29, 2008	Unreleased	January 24, 2008	FarSight Studios	Crave Entertainment
Harry Potter and the Goblet of Fire	November 15, 2005	November 18, 2005	Unreleased	Unreleased	Electronic Arts	Electronic Arts
Harry Potter and the Half-Blood Prince	June 30, 2009	July 3, 2009	Unreleased	July 2, 2009	EA Bright Light	Electronic Arts
Harry Potter and the Order of the Phoenix	June 25, 2007	June 29, 2007	Unreleased	June 28, 2007	Electronic Arts	Electronic Arts
Harukanaru Toki no Naka de 2	Unreleased	Unreleased	June 30, 2005	Unreleased	Ruby Party	Koei
Harukanaru Toki no Naka de 3 - with Izayoiki Aizouban	Unreleased	Unreleased	March 19, 2009	Unreleased	Koei	Koei
Harukanaru Toki no Naka de 3 - Unmei no Labyrinth Aizouban	Unreleased	Unreleased	October 22, 2009	Unreleased	Koei	Koei
Harukanaru Toki no Naka de 4: Aizouban	Unreleased	Unreleased	December 22, 2010	Unreleased	Koei Tecmo Games	Koei Tecmo Games
Harukanaru Toki no Naka de 5	Unreleased	Unreleased	February 24, 2011	Unreleased	Koei Tecmo Games	Koei Tecmo Games
Harukanaru Toki no Naka de 5: Kazahanaki	Unreleased	Unreleased	February 23, 2012	Unreleased	Koei Tecmo Games	Koei Tecmo Games
Harukanaru Toki no Naka de 6	Unreleased	Unreleased	March 12, 2015	Unreleased	Koei Tecmo Games	Koei Tecmo Games
Harukanaru Toki no Naka de: Hachiyoushou	Unreleased	Unreleased	February 14, 2013	Unreleased	Koei Tecmo Games	Koei Tecmo Games
Harukanaru Toki no Naka de: Iroetebako	Unreleased	Unreleased	April 7, 2005	Unreleased	Ruby Party	Koei
Harvest Moon: Boy & Girl	July 31, 2007	Unreleased	November 23, 2005	Unreleased	Marvelous Entertainment	Natsume Inc.
Harvest Moon: Hero of Leaf Valley	April 26, 2010	Unreleased	March 19, 2009	Unreleased	Marvelous Entertainment	Natsume Inc.
Harvey Birdman: Attorney at Law	January 8, 2008	Unreleased	Unreleased	Unreleased	High Voltage Software	Capcom
HatsuKare * Renai Debut Sengen!	Unreleased	Unreleased	Unreleased	April 4, 2013	FuRyu	FuRyu
Hatsune Miku: Project DIVA	Unreleased	Unreleased	July 2, 2009	Unreleased	[[Sega|: Sega; Crypton Future Media; Dingo Inc.; ]]	Sega
Hatsune Miku: Project DIVA 2nd	Unreleased	Unreleased	July 29, 2010	Unreleased	[[Dingo Inc.|: Sega; Crypton Future Media; Dingo Inc.; ]]	Sega
Hatsune Miku: Project DIVA Extend (Note: Update for Hatsune Miku: Project DIVA 2nd.)	Unreleased	Unreleased	November 10, 2011	Unreleased	Sega; Crypton Future Media; Dingo Inc.	Sega
Hatsune Miku: Project DIVA - Tsuika Gakkyokushuu Deluxe Pack 1 - Miku Uta, Okawari (Note: DLC for Hatsune Miku: Project DIVA. An additional song and edit-data pack, also containing a bonus mini-game.)	Unreleased	Unreleased	March 25, 2010	Unreleased	Sega	Sega
Hatsune Miku: Project DIVA - Tsuika Gakkyokushuu Deluxe Pack 2 - Motto Okawari, Rin-Ren Luka (Note: DLC for Hatsune Miku: Project DIVA. An additional song and edit-data pack, also containing a bonus mini-game.)	Unreleased	Unreleased	July 1, 2010	Unreleased	Sega	Sega
Hayarigami 2 Portable: Keishichou Kaii Jiken File	Unreleased	Unreleased	August 7, 2008	Unreleased	Nippon Ichi Software	Nippon Ichi Software
Hayarigami 3: Keishichou Kaii Jiken File	Unreleased	Unreleased	August 6, 2009	Unreleased	Nippon Ichi Software	Nippon Ichi Software
Hayarigami Portable: Keishichou Kaii Jiken File	Unreleased	Unreleased	December 15, 2005	Unreleased	Nippon Ichi Software	Nippon Ichi Software
Hayate no Gotoku! Nightmare Paradise	Unreleased	Unreleased	March 26, 2009	Unreleased	HuneX	Konami
Heart no Kuni no Alice: Anniversary Ver.: Wonderful Wonder World (Note: Update for Heart no Kuni no Alice: Wonderful Wonder World.)	Unreleased	Unreleased	July 28, 2011	Unreleased	QuinRose	QuinRose
Heart no Kuni no Alice: Wonderful Wonder World	Unreleased	Unreleased	July 30, 2009	Unreleased	QuinRose	QuinRose
Heart no Kuni no Alice: Wonderful Twin World	Unreleased	Unreleased	May 29, 2014	Unreleased	QuinRose	QuinRose
Heatseeker	May 8, 2007	May 25, 2007	Unreleased	June 1, 2007	Halfbrick	Codemasters
Heaven's Will	Unreleased	Unreleased	October 26, 2006	Unreleased	QuinRose	QuinRose
Hellboy: The Science of Evil	June 24, 2008	August 15, 2008	Unreleased	August 22, 2008	Krome Studios	Konami
Hello Kitty to Issho! Block Crash 123!!	Unreleased	Unreleased	July 15, 2010	Unreleased	Dorart	Dorart
Hello Kitty: Puzzle Party	Unreleased	February 19, 2010	May 28, 2009	Unreleased	Dorart	Ubisoft
Hentai Ouji to Warawanai Neko.	Unreleased	Unreleased	October 31, 2013	Unreleased	guyzware	C-Territory
Heroes Phantasia	Unreleased	Unreleased	January 19, 2012	Unreleased	Namco Bandai Games	Namco Bandai Games
Heroes' VS	Unreleased	Unreleased	February 7, 2013	Unreleased	Namco Bandai Games	Namco Bandai Games
Hexyz Force	June 2, 2010	Unreleased	November 12, 2009	Unreleased	Sting Entertainment	Atlus
Hilton Garden Inn: Ultimate Team Play	January 2009	Unreleased	Unreleased	Unreleased	Virtual Heroes	Virtual Heroes
Higanjima	Unreleased	Unreleased	April 28, 2005	Unreleased	Now Production	Now Production
Higurashi Daybreak Portable	Unreleased	Unreleased	November 27, 2008	Unreleased	Cavia	Alchemist
Higurashi Daybreak Portable Mega Edition (Note: Update for Higurashi Daybreak Portable.)	Unreleased	Unreleased	November 26, 2009	Unreleased	Cavia	Alchemist
Higurashi no Naku Koro ni Jan	Unreleased	Unreleased	November 12, 2009	Unreleased	SIMS	AQ Interactive
Hiiro no Kakera Portable	Unreleased	Unreleased	December 18, 2008	Unreleased	Otomate	Idea Factory
Hiiro no Kakera: Shin Tamayori Hime Denshou Portable	Unreleased	Unreleased	September 30, 2010	Unreleased	Idea Factory	Idea Factory
Hiiro no Kakera: Shin Tamayorihime Denshou - Piece of Future	Unreleased	Unreleased	July 14, 2011	Unreleased	Idea Factory	Idea Factory
Himawari no Kyoukai to Nagai Natsuyasumi: Extra Vacation	Unreleased	Unreleased	November 28, 2013	Unreleased	Kero Makura	Kero Makura
Himawari: Pebble in the Sky Portable	Unreleased	Unreleased	April 22, 2010	Unreleased	Kadokawa Games	Kadokawa Games
Himehibi: New Princess Days!! Zoku! Ni-Gakku Portable	Unreleased	Unreleased	February 25, 2010	Unreleased	Takuyo	Takuyo
Himehibi: Princess Days Portable	Unreleased	Unreleased	July 17, 2008	Unreleased	Takuyo	Takuyo
Hisshou Pachinko * Pachi-Slot Kouryaku Series Portable Vol. 2: CR Evangelion - Hajimari no Fukuin	Unreleased	Unreleased	November 18, 2010	Unreleased	D3 Publisher	D3 Publisher
Hisshou Pachinko * Pachi-Slot Kouryaku Series Portable Vol. 1: Shinseiki Evangelion Tamashii no Kiseki	Unreleased	Unreleased	June 3, 2010	Unreleased	D3 Publisher	D3 Publisher
The History Channel: Great Battles of Rome	Unreleased	June 15, 2007	Unreleased	Unreleased	Slitherine Strategies	Black Bean Games
Holy Invasion Of Privacy, Badman! What Did I Do To Deserve This?	July 16, 2009	October 9, 2009	December 6, 2007	Unreleased	Acquire	Nippon Ichi Software
The Hohei 2: Senyuu yo, Saki ni Ike	Unreleased	Unreleased	July 30, 2009	Unreleased	D3 Publisher	D3 Publisher
Hitsuji Kunnara Kiss Shite Ageru *	Unreleased	Unreleased	March 19, 2009	Unreleased	CyberFront	CyberFront
Hiyoko Kantei	Unreleased	Unreleased	April 20, 2011	Unreleased	SCEJ	SCEJ
Hoard	March 21, 2011	June 1, 2011	Unreleased	June 1, 2011	Big Sandwich Games	Big Sandwich Games
Hokuto no Ken: Raoh Gaiden - Ten no Haoh	Unreleased	Unreleased	January 22, 2009	Unreleased	Interchannel	Interchannel
Honkaku Yonin-uchi Pro Mahjong: Mahjong-Ou Portable	Unreleased	Unreleased	April 13, 2006	Unreleased	Taito	Taito
Honki de Manabu LEC de Goukakuru: Hishou Boki 3-Kyuu Portable (Note: Primarily an application, though it includes mini-games)	Unreleased	Unreleased	January 21, 2010	Unreleased	Square Enix	Square Enix
Hoshigari Empusa Portable	Unreleased	Unreleased	April 23, 2009	Unreleased	Takuyo	Takuyo
Hoshiiro no Okurimono Portable	Unreleased	Unreleased	November 27, 2008	Unreleased	Takuyo	Takuyo
Hoshiiro * Planet: One Small Step For...	Unreleased	Unreleased	March 10, 2011	Unreleased	CyberFront	CyberFront
Hot Brain	June 18, 2007	June 29, 2007	Unreleased	June 5, 2007	Midway San Diego	Midway Games
Hot Pixel	October 2, 2007	June 22, 2007	Unreleased	June 29, 2007	zSlide	Atari
Hot Shots Shorties; Minna no Sukkiri; Everybody's Stress Buster	January 3, 2011	December 22, 2010	October 1, 2009	Unreleased	Clap Hanz	SCEI / SCEA / SCEE
Hot Wheels Ultimate Racing	July 2, 2007	August 24, 2007	Unreleased	September 27, 2007	Raylight Studios	DSI / Oxygen Games
Houkago Colorful * Step: Bunkabu!	Unreleased	Unreleased	April 10, 2014	Unreleased	honeybee+	honeybee+
Houkago Colorful * Step: Undoubu!	Unreleased	Unreleased	January 9, 2014	Unreleased	honeybee+	honeybee+
Hunter X Hunter Wonder Adventure	Unreleased	Unreleased	September 20, 2012	Unreleased	Namco Bandai Games	Namco Bandai Games
The Hustle: Detroit Streets	October 25, 2005	March 9, 2007	Unreleased	June 7, 2007	Blade Interactive	Activision
Hyakki Yakou: Kaidan Romance	Unreleased	Unreleased	October 25, 2012	Unreleased	QuinRose	QuinRose
Hyakki Monogatari: Kaidan Romance	Unreleased	Unreleased	September 26, 2013	Unreleased	QuinRose	QuinRose
I.Q. Mania	Unreleased	Unreleased	March 9, 2006	Unreleased	SCEI	SCEI
I am an Air Traffic Controller Airport Hero Tokyo; Boku wa Koukuu Kanseikan: Airport Hero Haneda	October 30, 2012	Unreleased	October 7, 2010	Unreleased	Electronic Arts	Electronic Arts
Idol Janshi Suchi-Pai III Remix	Unreleased	Unreleased	July 26, 2007	Unreleased	Jaleco Entertainment	Jaleco Entertainment
Idol Janshi Suchi-Pai IV Portable	Unreleased	Unreleased	August 12, 2010	Unreleased	CyberFront	CyberFront
The Idolm@aster SP: Missing Moon	Unreleased	Unreleased	February 19, 2009	Unreleased	Bandai Namco Games	Bandai Namco Games
The Idolm@aster SP: Perfect Sun	Unreleased	Unreleased	February 19, 2009	Unreleased	Bandai Namco Games	Bandai Namco Games
The Idolm@aster SP: Wandering Star	Unreleased	Unreleased	February 19, 2009	Unreleased	Bandai Namco Games	Bandai Namco Games
The Idolm@aster: Shiny Festa - Funky Note	Unreleased	Unreleased	October 25, 2012	Unreleased	Namco	Bandai Namco Games
The Idolm@aster: Shiny Festa - Groovy Tune	Unreleased	Unreleased	October 25, 2012	Unreleased	Namco	Bandai Namco Games
The Idolm@aster: Shiny Festa - Honey Sound	Unreleased	Unreleased	October 25, 2012	Unreleased	Namco	Bandai Namco Games
Ikki Tousen: Eloquent Fist	Unreleased	Unreleased	October 2, 2008	Unreleased	Marvelous Entertainment	Marvelous Entertainment
Ikki Tousen: Xross Impact	Unreleased	Unreleased	April 28, 2010	Unreleased	Marvelous Entertainment	Marvelous Entertainment
IL-2 Sturmovik: Birds of Prey	September 10, 2009	September 4, 2009	Unreleased	September 9, 2009	SME Dynamic Systems	505 Games
Imagine Champion Rider	Unreleased	September 4, 2009	Unreleased	Unreleased	Ubisoft	Ubisoft
Impossible Mission	Unreleased	August 31, 2007	Unreleased	June 21, 2007	Epyx	Studio 3
Indiana Jones and the Staff of Kings	June 9, 2009	June 12, 2009	Unreleased	June 19, 2009	LucasArts	LucasArts
Infected	November 15, 2005	September 29, 2006	Unreleased	Unreleased	Planet Moon Studios	Majesco
Initial D: Street Stage	Unreleased	Unreleased	February 23, 2006	Unreleased	TOSE	Epyx
Innocent Life: A Futuristic Harvest Moon	May 15, 2007	May 18, 2007	April 27, 2006	March 22, 2006	ArtePiazza	Marvelous / Red Ant / Natsume Inc. / Rising Star
Infinite Loop: Kojjou ga Miseta Yume	Unreleased	Unreleased	July 24, 2008	Unreleased	Nippon Ichi Software	Nippon Ichi Software
International Athletics	Unreleased	August 1, 2008	Unreleased	August 7, 2008	TOSE	Sega
International Cricket Captain III	Unreleased	November 16, 2007	Unreleased	Unreleased	Empire Interactive	Empire Interactive
Invizimals	October 12, 2010	November 13, 2009	Unreleased	Unreleased	Novarama	SCEE
Invizimals: Hidden Challenges	Unreleased	January 29, 2014	Unreleased	Unreleased	Novarama	SCEE
Invizimals: Shadow Zone	October 25, 2011	November 12, 2010	Unreleased	Unreleased	Novarama	SCEE
Invizimals: The Lost Tribes	September 23, 2014	November 4, 2011	Unreleased	Unreleased	Novarama	SCEE
Iron Man	May 2, 2008	May 9, 2008	Unreleased	May 15, 2008	Artificial Mind and Movement	Sega
Iron Man 2	May 4, 2010	April 30, 2010	Unreleased	Unreleased	High Voltage Software	Sega
Ishin Renka: Ryouma Gaiden	Unreleased	Unreleased	December 25, 2010	Unreleased	D3 Publisher	D3 Publisher
Issho ni Gohan. Portable	Unreleased	Unreleased	January 24, 2013	Unreleased	Idea Factory	Idea Factory
Isshou Asoberu Todai Shogi: Sakidzume Shogi Dojo	Unreleased	Unreleased	April 19, 2007	Unreleased	NCS	NCS
Itsuka Kono Te ga Kegareru Toki ni: Spectral Force Legacy	Unreleased	Unreleased	November 26, 2009	Unreleased	Neverland	Idea Factory
Itsuka Tenma no Kuro Usagi Portable	Unreleased	Unreleased	December 22, 2011	Unreleased	Kadokawa Games	Kadokawa Games
Itsumono Table 5	Unreleased	Unreleased	September 2, 2010	Unreleased	Kadokawa	Kadokawa
Iza, Shutshjin! Koisen Dai-ni-maku - Echigo-Hen	Unreleased	Unreleased	February 27, 2014	Unreleased	Asgard	Asgard
Iza, Shutshjin! Koisen Dai-ni-maku - Kai-Hen	Unreleased	Unreleased	February 27, 2014	Unreleased	Asgard	Asgard
Iza, Shutshjin! Koisen	Unreleased	Unreleased	May 26, 2011	Unreleased	QuinRose	QuinRose
J.League Pro Soccer Club o Tsukurou! 6: Pride of J	Unreleased	Unreleased	November 12, 2009	Unreleased	Sega	Sega
J.League Pro Soccer Club o Tsukurou! 7 Euro Plus	Unreleased	Unreleased	August 4, 2011	Unreleased	Sega	Sega
J.League Pro Soccer Club o Tsukurou! 8 Euro Plus	Unreleased	Unreleased	October 17, 2013	Unreleased	Sega	Sega
Jackass: The Game	September 27, 2007	November 23, 2007	Unreleased	April 3, 2008	Sidhe Interactive	Red Mile Entertainment
Jak and Daxter: The Lost Frontier	November 3, 2009	November 20, 2009	November 19, 2009	November 19, 2009	High Impact Games	SCEA / SCEE / SCEI
James Cameron's Avatar: The Game	December 8, 2009	December 11, 2009	Unreleased	Unreleased	Ubisoft Montreal	Ubisoft / Lightstorm Entertainment / 20th Century Fox Games
Jan Sangoku Musou	Unreleased	Unreleased	September 28, 2006	Unreleased	Koei Tecmo Games	Koei Tecmo Games
Jansei Gakuen Chrono * Magic	Unreleased	Unreleased	April 18, 2013	Unreleased	Boost On	Boost On
Jansei Gakuen Chrono * Star	Unreleased	Unreleased	May 30, 2013	Unreleased	Boost On	Boost On
Jeanne d'Arc	August 21, 2007	Unreleased	November 22, 2006	Unreleased	Level-5	SCEI / SCEA
Jet de Go! Pocket: Let's Go By Airliner	Unreleased	Unreleased	December 15, 2005	Unreleased	Taito	Taito
Jewelic Nightmare	Unreleased	Unreleased	December 26, 2013	Unreleased	Idea Factory	Idea Factory
Jigoku 1000 bon no Knock	Unreleased	Unreleased	April 20, 2011	Unreleased	SCEJ	SCEJ
Jikandia: The Timeless Land	March 15, 2011	Unreleased	July 8, 2010	Unreleased	Opus	Aksys Games
Jikkyou Powerful Pro Yakyuu 2010	Unreleased	Unreleased	July 15, 2010	Unreleased	Konami	Konami
Jikkyou Powerful Pro Yakyuu 2011	Unreleased	Unreleased	July 14, 2011	Unreleased	Konami	Konami
Jikkyou Powerful Pro Yakyuu 2011 Ketteiban (Note: Update for Jikkyou Powerful Pro Yakyuu 2011.)	Unreleased	Unreleased	December 22, 2011	Unreleased	Konami	Konami
Jikkyou Powerful Pro Yakyuu 2012	Unreleased	Unreleased	July 19, 2012	Unreleased	Konami	Konami
Jikkyou Powerful Pro Yakyuu 2012 Ketteiban (Note: Update for Jikkyou Powerful Pro Yakyuu 2012.)	Unreleased	Unreleased	December 13, 2012	Unreleased	Konami	Konami
Jikkyou Powerful Pro Yakyuu 2013	Unreleased	Unreleased	October 24, 2013	Unreleased	Konami	Konami
Jikkyou Powerful Pro Yakyuu Portable	Unreleased	Unreleased	April 1, 2006	Unreleased	Konami	Konami
Jikkyou Powerful Pro Yakyuu Portable 2	Unreleased	Unreleased	April 5, 2007	Unreleased	Konami	Konami
Jikkyou Powerful Pro Yakyuu Portable 3	Unreleased	Unreleased	May 29, 2008	Unreleased	Konami	Konami
Jikkyou Powerful Pro Yakyuu Portable 4	Unreleased	Unreleased	September 17, 2009	Unreleased	Konami	Konami
Jissen Pachi-Slot Hisshouhou! Hokuto no Ken Portable	Unreleased	Unreleased	June 30, 2005	Unreleased	Sammy Studios	Sammy Studios
Jissen Pachi-Slot Hisshouhou! Hokuto no Ken SE Portable	Unreleased	Unreleased	August 10, 2006	Unreleased	Sammy Studios	Sammy Studios
Jissen Pachi-Slot Hisshouhou! Portable: Aladdin II Evolution	Unreleased	Unreleased	March 30, 2006	Unreleased	Sega	Sega
Jitsuroku Oniyome Nikki	Unreleased	Unreleased	February 23, 2006	Unreleased	AQ Interactive	AQ Interactive
Jitsuwa Kaidan: Shinmimi Bukuro - Ichi no Shou	Unreleased	Unreleased	July 28, 2005	Unreleased	Metro	Metro
Joker no Kuni no Alice	Unreleased	Unreleased	October 27, 2011	Unreleased	QuinRose	QuinRose
Judie no Atelier: Grammad no Renkinjutsushi - Toraware no Mamoribito	Unreleased	Unreleased	April 8, 2010	Unreleased	Gust	Gust
Jufun	Unreleased	Unreleased	April 20, 2011	Unreleased	SCEJ	SCEJ
Jugyouchuu	Unreleased	Unreleased	April 20, 2011	Unreleased	SCEJ	SCEJ
Jui: Dr. Touma Joutarou	Unreleased	Unreleased	February 23, 2006	Unreleased	Taito	Taito
Juiced: Eliminator	June 28, 2006	July 28, 2006	Unreleased	May 24, 2007	Juice Games	THQ
Juiced 2: Hot Import Nights	October 8, 2007	October 9, 2007	Unreleased	October 25, 2007	Juice Games	THQ
Jukugon	Unreleased	Unreleased	July 13, 2006	Unreleased	Sega	Sega
Jungle Party	Unreleased	November 19, 2010	Unreleased	Unreleased	Magenta Software	SCEE
Justice League Heroes	November 22, 2006	December 8, 2006	Unreleased	December 22, 2006	Snowblind Studios	Warner Bros. / Eidos Interactive
Juujigen Rippoutai Sypher Portable	Unreleased	Unreleased	August 27, 2009	Unreleased	Abel Software	Views
Juusei to Diamond	Unreleased	Unreleased	June 18, 2009	Unreleased	Sony Computer Entertainment	Sony Computer Entertainment
Jyuzaengi: Engetsu Sangokuden	Unreleased	Unreleased	May 24, 2012	Unreleased	Idea Factory	Idea Factory
Jyuzaengi: Engetsu Sangokuden 2	Unreleased	Unreleased	April 17, 2014	Unreleased	Idea Factory	Idea Factory
K-On! Houkago Live!!	Unreleased	Unreleased	September 30, 2010	Unreleased	Sega	Sega
Kaeru Batake de Tsukamaete Portable	Unreleased	Unreleased	November 11, 2010	Unreleased	Takuyo	Takuyo
Kaeru Batake de Tsukamaete Portable: Natsu Senbokuryou Sansen Portable	Unreleased	Unreleased	June 16, 2011	Unreleased	Takuyo	Takuyo
Kaitou Apricot Portable	Unreleased	Unreleased	October 25, 2007	Unreleased	Takuyo	Takuyo
Kaitou Tenshi Twin Angel: Toki to Sekai no Meikyuu	Unreleased	Unreleased	August 25, 2011	Unreleased	Alchemist	Alchemist
Kaleidoeve	Unreleased	Unreleased	January 22, 2015	Unreleased	HuneX	estciel
Kamaitachi no Yoru 2	Unreleased	Unreleased	May 25, 2006	Unreleased	ChunSoft	ChunSoft
Kamen no Maid Guy: Boyoyon Battle Royale	Unreleased	Unreleased	February 26, 2009	Unreleased	Gadget Soft	Gadget Soft
Kamen Rider Climax Heroes Fourze	Unreleased	Unreleased	December 1, 2011	Unreleased	Eighting	Bandai Namco Games
Kamen Rider: Climax Heroes OOO	Unreleased	Unreleased	December 2, 2010	Unreleased	Eighting	Namco Bandai Games
Kamen Rider Chou Climax Heroes	Unreleased	Unreleased	November 29, 2012	Unreleased	Eighting	Namco Bandai Games
Kami Naru Kimi to	Unreleased	Unreleased	October 20, 2011	Unreleased	Idea Factory	Idea Factory
Kamigami no Asobi	Unreleased	Unreleased	October 24, 2013	Unreleased	Broccoli	Broccoli
Kamigami no Asobi InFinite	Unreleased	Unreleased	April 21, 2016	Unreleased	Broccoli	Broccoli
Kamisama to Koi Gokoro	Unreleased	Unreleased	May 31, 2012	Unreleased	Takuyo	Takuyo
Kana: Imouto	Unreleased	Unreleased	October 7, 2010	Unreleased	CyberFront	CyberFront
Kannou Mukashi Banashi Portable	Unreleased	Unreleased	January 19, 2012	Unreleased	Idea Factory	Idea Factory
Kano*Yan: Kanojo ga Yanjattara Dousuru no?	Unreleased	Unreleased	November 1, 2012	Unreleased	System Prisma	System Prisma
Kanon	Unreleased	Unreleased	February 15, 2007	Unreleased	Prototype	Prototype
Kanuchi: Futatsu no Tsubasa	Unreleased	Unreleased	December 16, 2010	Unreleased	Idea Factory	Idea Factory
Kao Challengers	March 29, 2006	October 28, 2005	Unreleased	Unreleased	Tate Interactive	Atari SA
Karate Life	Unreleased	Unreleased	April 20, 2011	Unreleased	SCEJ	SCEJ
Katekyoo Hitman Reborn! Battle Arena	Unreleased	Unreleased	September 18, 2008	Unreleased	Ancient	Marvelous Entertainment
Katekyoo Hitman Reborn! Battle Arena 2 Spirits Burst	Unreleased	Unreleased	September 17, 2008	Unreleased	Ancient	Marvelous Entertainment
Katekyoo Hitman Reborn! Kizuna no Tag Battle	Unreleased	Unreleased	February 25, 2010	Unreleased	Ancient	Marvelous Entertainment
Kawashima Ryuuta Kyouju Kanshuu Nouryoku Trainer Portable	Unreleased	Unreleased	October 20, 2005	Unreleased	Sega	Sega
Kawashima Ryuuta Kyouju Kanshuu Nouryoku Trainer Portable 2	Unreleased	Unreleased	May 25, 2006	Unreleased	Sega	Sega
Kazoku Keikaku	Unreleased	Unreleased	August 12, 2010	Unreleased	CyberFront	CyberFront
Kazook	Unreleased	October 20, 2006	Unreleased	Unreleased	Monte Cristo	Xplosiv
Ken to Mahou to Gakuen Mono. 3	Unreleased	Unreleased	October 7, 2010	Unreleased	Acquire	Acquire
Ken to Mahou to Gakuen Mono. Final: Shinnyusei wa Ohimesama	Unreleased	Unreleased	October 13, 2011	Unreleased	Acquire	Acquire
Kenka Bancho: Badass Rumble	November 10, 2009	Unreleased	November 27, 2008	Unreleased	Spike	Atlus / Spike
Kenka Bancho 4: Ichinen Sensou	Unreleased	Unreleased	February 25, 2010	Unreleased	Spike Chunsoft	Spike Chunsoft
Kenka Bancho 5: Otoko no Housoku	Unreleased	Unreleased	January 27, 2011	Unreleased	Spike Chunsoft	Spike Chunsoft
Kenka Bancho Bros. Tokyo Battle Royale	Unreleased	Unreleased	June 21, 2012	Unreleased	Spike Chunsoft	Spike Chunsoft
Kenka Bancho Portable	Unreleased	Unreleased	October 29, 2009	Unreleased	Spike Chunsoft	Spike Chunsoft
Kidou Senshi Gundam AGE: Cosmic Drive	Unreleased	Unreleased	August 30, 2012	Unreleased	Level 5	Bandai Namco Games
Kidou Senshi Gundam AGE: Universe Accel	Unreleased	Unreleased	August 30, 2012	Unreleased	Level 5	Bandai Namco Games
Kidou Senshi Gundam: Ghiren no Yabou - Axis no Kyoui	Unreleased	Unreleased	February 7, 2008	Unreleased	Bandai Namco Games	Bandai Namco Games
Kidou Senshi Gundam: Ghiren no Yabou - Axis no Kyoui V (Note: Update for Kidou Senshi Gundam: Ghiren no Yabou - Axis no Kyoui.)	Unreleased	Unreleased	February 12, 2009	Unreleased	Bandai Namco Games	Bandai Namco Games
Kidou Senshi Gundam: Ghiren no Yabou - Zeon no Keifu	Unreleased	Unreleased	August 11, 2005	Unreleased	Bandai Namco Games	Bandai Namco Games
Kidou Senshi Gundam: Gundam vs. Gundam	Unreleased	Unreleased	November 20, 2008	Unreleased	Banpresto	Bandai Namco Games
Kidou Senshi Gundam: Gundam vs. Gundam NEXT PLUS	Unreleased	Unreleased	December 3, 2009	Unreleased	Capcom	Bandai Namco Games
Kidou Senshi Gundam: Mokuba no Kiseki	Unreleased	Unreleased	January 26, 2012	Unreleased	Bandai Namco Games	Bandai Namco Games
Kidou Senshi Gundam: Senjou no Kizuna Portable	Unreleased	Unreleased	March 26, 2009	Unreleased	Bandai Namco Games	Bandai Namco Games
Kidou Senshi Gundam: Shin Gihren no Yabou	Unreleased	Unreleased	August 25, 2011	Unreleased	Bandai Namco Games	Bandai Namco Games
Killzone: Liberation	October 31, 2006	November 3, 2006	Unreleased	November 8, 2006	Guerrilla Games	SCEA / SCEE
Kimi ga Aruji de Shitsuji ga Ore de: Otsukae Nikki Portable	Unreleased	Unreleased	November 29, 2012	Unreleased	Minato Station	Minato Station
Kimikare: Shingakki	Unreleased	Unreleased	July 19, 2012	Unreleased	Winlight	Idea Factory
King of Clubs	Unreleased	March 20, 2008	Unreleased	January 17, 2008	Oxygen Studios	Oxygen Games
The King of Fighters Collection: The Orochi Saga	October 28, 2008	February 27, 2009	June 24, 2010	Unreleased	SNK Playmore	SNK Playmore
King of Pool	April 8, 2010	June 28, 2009	February 23, 2012	Unreleased	Ivolgamus	Nordcurrent
King's Field: Additional I	Unreleased	Unreleased	July 20, 2006	Unreleased	From Software	From Software
King's Field: Additional II	Unreleased	Unreleased	August 24, 2006	Unreleased	From Software	From Software
Kingdom Hearts Birth by Sleep	September 7, 2010	September 10, 2010	January 9, 2010	September 10, 2010	Square Enix Product Development Division 5	Square Enix
Kingdom of Paradise	November 15, 2005	March 24, 2006	July 21, 2005	Unreleased	Climax Entertainment	SCEI / SCEA / SCEE
Kingdom: Ikki Tousen no Tsurugi	Unreleased	Unreleased	November 25, 2010	Unreleased	Konami	Konami
Kiniro no Corda 2 Forte Encore	Unreleased	Unreleased	August 20, 2009	Unreleased	Koei	Koei
Kiniro no Corda 2 f	Unreleased	Unreleased	February 26, 2009	Unreleased	Koei	Koei
Kiniro no Corda 3	Unreleased	Unreleased	February 25, 2010	Unreleased	Koei	Koei
Kiniro no Corda 3: Another Sky feat. Amane Gakuen	Unreleased	Unreleased	September 25, 2014	Unreleased	Koei	Koei
Kiniro no Corda 3: Another Sky feat. Jinnan	Unreleased	Unreleased	January 23, 2014	Unreleased	Koei	Koei
Kiniro no Corda 3: Another Sky feat. Shiseikan	Unreleased	Unreleased	March 27, 2014	Unreleased	Koei	Koei
Kiniro no Corda 3: Full Voice Special (Note: Update for Kiniro no Corda 3.)	Unreleased	Unreleased	September 19, 2013	Unreleased	Koei	Koei
Kinnikuman: Muscle Generations	Unreleased	Unreleased	February 23, 2006	Unreleased	Bandai	Aki Corp.
Kinoko or Die 2	Unreleased	Unreleased	April 22, 2010	Unreleased	SCEI	SCEI
Kisaragi Gold * Star: Nonstop Go Go!!	Unreleased	Unreleased	September 5, 2013	Unreleased	Saga Planets	Piacci
Kisetsu o Dakishimete	Unreleased	Unreleased	July 28, 2005	Unreleased	SCEI	SCEI
Kisou Ryouhei Gunhound EX	Unreleased	Unreleased	January 31, 2013	Unreleased	Dracue	G.Rev
Knights in the Nightmare	November 5, 2010	Unreleased	April 22, 2010	Unreleased	Sting Entertainment	Atlus
Koezaru wa Akai Hana: Taiga wa Mirai o Tsugumu	Unreleased	Unreleased	March 20, 2014	Unreleased	Operetta	dramatic create
Koi Sentai Love & Peace the P.S.P: Power Zenkai! Special Youso Tenkomori de Portable Ka Daisakusen de Aru!	Unreleased	Unreleased	August 30, 2012	Unreleased	Broccoli	Broccoli
Koi to Senkyo to Chocolate Portable	Unreleased	Unreleased	September 27, 2012	Unreleased	Kadokawa	Kadokawa
Koi wa Rule ni Shibararenai!	Unreleased	Unreleased	November 29, 2012	Unreleased	Vridge	Kadokawa
Koibana Days	Unreleased	Unreleased	June 20, 2013	Unreleased	Otomate	Idea Factory
Koisuru Otome to Shugo no Tate Portable	Unreleased	Unreleased	July 29, 2010	Unreleased	Axl	Alchemist
Kokoro Connect: Yochi Random	Unreleased	Unreleased	November 22, 2012	Unreleased	AI	Bandai Namco Games
Konneko: Keep a Memory Green	Unreleased	Unreleased	December 8, 2011	Unreleased	Regista	CyberFront
Kono Aozora ni Yakusoku o - Tenohira no Rakuen	Unreleased	Unreleased	June 25, 2009	Unreleased	TGL	TGL
Kono Bushitsu wa Kitaku Shinai Bu ga Senkyo Shimashita. Portable: Gakuen Dog Ear Hen	Unreleased	Unreleased	October 25, 2012	Unreleased	Boost On	Boost On
Kono Bushitsu wa Kitaku Shinai Bu ga Senkyo Shimashita. Portable: Gakuen Summer Wars Hen	Unreleased	Unreleased	August 2, 2012	Unreleased	Boost On	Boost On
Koori no Bohyou: Ichiyanagi Nagomu, 3-dome no Junan	Unreleased	Unreleased	February 25, 2010	Unreleased	Fog	Nippon Ichi Software
Korokoro Kollon	Unreleased	Unreleased	June 20, 2006	Unreleased	505 Games	CyberFront
Kotoba no Puzzle: Mojipittan	Unreleased	Unreleased	December 16, 2004	Unreleased	Namco	Namco
Kud Wafter Converted Edition	Unreleased	Unreleased	May 9, 2013	Unreleased	Key	Prototype
Kuon no Kizuna: Sairin Mikotonori Portable	Unreleased	Unreleased	November 17, 2011	Unreleased	GN Software	GN Software
Kurogane no Linebarrels	Unreleased	Unreleased	October 8, 2009	Unreleased	Hudson Soft	Hudson Soft
Kurohyō: Ryū ga Gotoku Shinshō	Unreleased	Unreleased	September 22, 2010	Unreleased	Ryu Ga Gotoku Studio, syn Sophia	Sega
Kurohyō 2: Ryu ga Gotoku Ashura hen	Unreleased	Unreleased	March 22, 2012	Unreleased	syn Sophia	Sega
Kuroko no Basuke: Kiseki no Game	Unreleased	Unreleased	August 9, 2012	Unreleased	Bandai Namco Games	Bandai Namco Games
Kuroyukihime: Snow Black	Unreleased	Unreleased	April 24, 2014	Unreleased	QuinRose	QuinRose
Kuroyukihime: Snow Magic	Unreleased	Unreleased	December 4, 2014	Unreleased	QuinRose	QuinRose
Kurulin Fusion	December 10, 2009	Unreleased	Unreleased	Unreleased	Tozai Games	MTO USA
Kusaimon 2	Unreleased	Unreleased	April 22, 2010	Unreleased	SCEI	SCEI
Kyoukai Senjou no Horizon Portable	Unreleased	Unreleased	April 25, 2013	Unreleased	Tenky	Kadokawa
L no Kisetsu: Double Pocket	Unreleased	Unreleased	November 26, 2009	Unreleased	5pb	5pb
L.G.S. Shinsetsu Houshinengi	Unreleased	Unreleased	August 9, 2012	Unreleased	Idea Factory	Idea Factory
La Corda d'Oro	Unreleased	Unreleased	November 10, 2005	Unreleased	Koei	Koei
La Pucelle: Ragnarok	Unreleased	Unreleased	November 26, 2009	Unreleased	Nippon Ichi Software	Nippon Ichi Software
Lanfeust of Troy	Unreleased	May 7, 2008	Unreleased	Unreleased	Atari	Atari
Last Escort: Club Katze	Unreleased	Unreleased	February 18, 2010	Unreleased	Mobile & Gamestudio	D3 Publisher
Last Ranker	Unreleased	Unreleased	July 15, 2010	Unreleased	Imagepooch	Capcom
The Legend of Heroes: A Tear of Vermillion	November 15, 2005	Unreleased	June 2, 2005	Unreleased	Nihon Falcom	Bandai
The Legend of Heroes II: Prophecy of the Moonlight Witch	June 20, 2006	Unreleased	December 16, 2004	Unreleased	Nihon Falcom	Namco Bandai Games
The Legend of Heroes III: Song of the Ocean	January 23, 2007	Unreleased	January 12, 2006	Unreleased	Nihon Falcom	Namco Bandai Games
The Legend of Heroes: Trails from Zero	Unreleased	Unreleased	September 30, 2010	Unreleased	Nihon Falcom	Nihon Falcom
The Legend of Heroes: Trails in the Sky	March 29, 2011	November 4, 2011	October 28, 2006	Unreleased	Nihon Falcom	Nihon Falcom / Xseed Games
The Legend of Heroes: Trails in the Sky SC	October 29, 2015	November 10, 2015	September 27, 2007	November 10, 2015	Nihon Falcom	Nihon Falcom / Xseed Games
The Legend of Heroes: Trails in the Sky the 3rd	Unreleased	Unreleased	July 24, 2008	Unreleased	Nihon Falcom	Nihon Falcom
The Legend of Heroes: Trails to Azure	Unreleased	Unreleased	September 29, 2011	Unreleased	Nihon Falcom	Nihon Falcom
The Legend of Nayuta: Boundless Trails	Unreleased	Unreleased	July 26, 2012	Unreleased	Nihon Falcom	Nihon Falcom
Legend of the Dragon	May 29, 2007	June 15, 2007	Unreleased	June 14, 2007	Neko Entertainment	The Game Factory
Legends of War: Patton's Campaign	January 4, 2011	October 20, 2010	Unreleased	January 5, 2016	Enigma Software Productions	Enigma Software Productions
Lego Batman: The Video Game	September 23, 2008	October 10, 2008	Unreleased	October 15, 2008	Traveller's Tales	Warner Bros. Interactive Entertainment
Lego Indiana Jones: The Original Adventures	June 3, 2008	June 13, 2008	Unreleased	June 4, 2008	Traveller's Tales	LucasArts
Lego Indiana Jones 2: The Adventure Continues	November 17, 2009	November 20, 2009	Unreleased	November 25, 2009	Traveller's Tales	LucasArts
Lego Harry Potter: Years 1–4	June 29, 2010	June 25, 2010	Unreleased	June 29, 2010	Traveller's Tales	Warner Bros. Interactive Entertainment
Lego Harry Potter: Years 5–7	November 11, 2011	November 18, 2011	Unreleased	November 30, 2011	Traveller's Tales	Warner Bros. Interactive Entertainment
Lego Pirates Of The Caribbean	May 10, 2011	May 13, 2011	Unreleased	May 19, 2011	Traveller's Tales	Disney Interactive Studios
Lego Star Wars II: The Original Trilogy	September 12, 2006	November 10, 2006	Unreleased	September 15, 2006	Traveller's Tales	LucasArts
Lego Star Wars III: The Clone Wars	March 22, 2011	March 25, 2011	Unreleased	March 30, 2011	Traveller's Tales	LucasArts
Lemmings	May 23, 2006	March 10, 2006	March 9, 2006	October 19, 2006	Team17	SCEI / SCEE / SCEA
Like Life Every Hour	Unreleased	Unreleased	October 1, 2009	Unreleased	HuneX	GN Software
Lisa to Issho ni Tairiku Oudan: A-Ressha de Ikou	Unreleased	Unreleased	June 22, 2006	Unreleased	Artdink	Idea Factory
Little Aid Portable	Unreleased	Unreleased	May 17, 2007	Unreleased	Takuyo	Takuyo
LittleBigPlanet	November 17, 2009	November 20, 2009	November 19, 2009	December 3, 2009	Cambridge Studio	SCEE
Little Britain: The Video Game	Unreleased	September 21, 2007	Unreleased	October 4, 2007	Revolution Studios	Blast! Entertainment
Littlewitch Parfait: Kuroneko Mahouten Monogatari	Unreleased	Unreleased	March 22, 2012	Unreleased	Kodago Studio	CyberFront
Little Busters! Converted Edition	Unreleased	Unreleased	November 25, 2010	Unreleased	Prototype	Prototype
LocoRoco	September 5, 2006	June 23, 2006	July 13, 2006	2006	Japan Studio	SCEE / SCEI / SCEA
LocoRoco 2	February 10, 2009	November 21, 2008	December 4, 2008	November 27, 2008	Japan Studio	SCEE / SCEI / SCEA
LocoRoco Midnight Carnival	October 29, 2009	October 29, 2009	November 1, 2009	2006	Japan Studio	SCEE / SCEI / SCEA
Lord of Apocalypse (Note: Update for Lord of Arcana. A reworked version of the earlier game; the PSP and Vita editions have the same content.)	Unreleased	Unreleased	December 17, 2011	Unreleased	Access Games	Square Enix
Lord of Arcana	January 25, 2011	February 4, 2011	October 14, 2010	Unreleased	Access Games	Square Enix
The Lord of the Rings: Aragorn's Quest	September 14, 2010	October 29, 2010	Unreleased	October 27, 2010	TT Fusion	Warner Bros. Interactive Entertainment
The Lord of the Rings: Tactics	November 8, 2005	December 2, 2005	Unreleased	Unreleased	Amaze Entertainment	Electronic Arts
Lost Heroes	Unreleased	Unreleased	September 6, 2012	Unreleased	Bandai Namco Games	Bandai Namco Games
L@ve Once	Unreleased	Unreleased	September 30, 2010	Unreleased	Maid meets Cat	Maid meets Cat
Love@Wan-Jong	Unreleased	Unreleased	April 3, 2012	Unreleased	Happinet	Happinet
Lucian Bee's Evil Violet	Unreleased	Unreleased	October 28, 2010	Unreleased	5pb	5pb
Lucian Bee's Justice Yellow	Unreleased	Unreleased	October 28, 2010	Unreleased	5pb	5pb
Lucian Bee's Resurrection Supernova	Unreleased	Unreleased	October 28, 2010	Unreleased	5pb	5pb
Lucky * Star: Net Idol Meister	Unreleased	Unreleased	December 23, 2009	Unreleased	Vridge	Kadowa
Lucky * Star: Ryouou Gakuen Outousai Portable	Unreleased	Unreleased	December 22, 2010	Unreleased	Vridge	Kadowa
Lumines	March 24, 2005	September 1, 2005	December 12, 2004	Unreleased	Q Entertainment	Ubisoft
Lumines II	November 6, 2006	November 17, 2006	February 15, 2007	Unreleased	Q Entertainment	Buena Vista Games / Q Entertainment
Lunar: Silver Star Harmony	March 2, 2010	Unreleased	November 12, 2009	Unreleased	Game ArtsStudio Alex	Xseed Games
Lup Salad Portable Matatabi: Lupupu Cube	Unreleased	Unreleased	January 28, 2010	Unreleased	Dimple Entertainment	Dimple Entertainment
Luxor: Pharaoh's Challenge	December 18, 2007	April 25, 2007	Unreleased	Unreleased	MumboJumbo	MumboJumbo
Luxor: Wrath of Set	November 17, 2006	Unreleased	Unreleased	Unreleased	MumboJumbo	MumboJumbo
M.A.C.H. Modified Air Combat Heroes	February 20, 2007	March 9, 2007	January 18, 2007	Unreleased	Kuju Entertainment	Sierra Entertainment
Machi: Unmei no Kousaten: Tokubetsuhen	Unreleased	Unreleased	July 30, 2006	Unreleased	Chunsoft	Chunsoft
Machi-Ing Maker 3 x Tousouchuu	Unreleased	Unreleased	January 28, 2010	Unreleased	Indi Software Co., Ltd.	D3 Publisher
Macross Ace Frontier	Unreleased	Unreleased	October 9, 2008	Unreleased	Bandai Namco Games	Bandai Namco Games
Macross Triangle Frontier	Unreleased	Unreleased	February 3, 2011	Unreleased	Bandai Namco Games	Bandai Namco Games
Macross Ultimate Frontier	Unreleased	Unreleased	October 1, 2009	Unreleased	Bandai Namco Games	Bandai Namco Games
Madden NFL 06	September 20, 2005	December 16, 2005	Unreleased	Unreleased	EA Tiburon	EA Sports
Madden NFL 07	August 22, 2006	Unreleased	Unreleased	October 26, 2006	EA Tiburon	EA Sports
Madden NFL 08	August 14, 2007	August 24, 2007	Unreleased	August 23, 2007	EA Tiburon	EA Sports
Madden NFL 09	August 12, 2008	August 15, 2008	Unreleased	August 14, 2008	EA Tiburon	EA Sports
Madden NFL 10	August 14, 2009	August 14, 2009	Unreleased	Unreleased	EA Tiburon	EA Sports
Madden NFL 11	August 10, 2010	Unreleased	September 30, 2010	Unreleased	EA Tiburon	EA Sports
Madden NFL 12	August 30, 2011	Unreleased	Unreleased	Unreleased	EA Tiburon	EA Sports
Magical Girl Lyrical Nanoha A's Portable: The Battle of Aces	Unreleased	Unreleased	January 21, 2010	Unreleased	Namco Bandai Games	Namco Bandai Games
Magical Girl Lyrical Nanoha A's Portable: The Gears of Destiny	Unreleased	Unreleased	December 22, 2011	Unreleased	Namco Bandai Games	Namco Bandai Games
Magna Carta Portable	Unreleased	Unreleased	May 25, 2006	Unreleased	Banpresto	Banpresto
MagusTale Eternity: Seikaiju to Koisuru Mahou Tsukai	Unreleased	Unreleased	December 24, 2009	Unreleased	HuneX	GN Software
The Mahjong	Unreleased	Unreleased	August 5, 2010	Unreleased	Yuki	D3 Publisher
Mahjong Fight Club	Unreleased	Unreleased	December 12, 2004	Unreleased	Konami	Konami
Mahjong Fight Club: Zenkoku Taisen Ban (Note: Update for Mahjong Fight Club.)	Unreleased	Unreleased	December 7, 2006	Unreleased	Konami	Konami
Mahjong Haoh Battle Royale II	Unreleased	Unreleased	January 14, 2010	Unreleased	NCS	NCS
Mahjong Haoh Portable: Dankyuu Battle	Unreleased	Unreleased	December 6, 2007	Unreleased	NCS	NCS
Mahjong Haoh Portable: Jansou Battle	Unreleased	Unreleased	November 30, 2006	Unreleased	NCS	NCS
Mahjong Taikai	Unreleased	Unreleased	December 22, 2004	Unreleased	Koei	Koei
Mahou Shoujo Lyrical Nanoha A's Portable: DL Magazine - Digital Nanoha (Note: Primarily a digital magazine and application, though it includes the brick-breaking mini-game Bind Breaker.)	Unreleased	Unreleased	February 16, 2010	Unreleased	Bandai Namco Games	Bandai Namco Games
Mahoutsukai to Goshujin-sama: New Ground	Unreleased	Unreleased	November 23, 2011	Unreleased	QuinRose	QuinRose
Mai-Hime Bakuretsu! Fuuka Gakuen Gekitoushi?!	Unreleased	Unreleased	February 23, 2006	Unreleased	Marvelous Entertainment	Marvelous Entertainment
Mai-Hime Senretsu! Shin Fuuka Gakuen Gekitoushi!!	Unreleased	Unreleased	April 27, 2006	Unreleased	Sunrise Interactive	Sunrise Interactive
Maid * Paradise: Mokushise! Maid Number One!	Unreleased	Unreleased	November 2, 2011	Unreleased	Spike	Spike
Major League Baseball 2K6	April 13, 2006	Unreleased	Unreleased	Unreleased	Visual Concepts	2K Sports
Major League Baseball 2K7	February 26, 2007	Unreleased	Unreleased	Unreleased	Kush Games	2K Sports
Major League Baseball 2K8	March 3, 2008	Unreleased	Unreleased	Unreleased	Kush Games	2K Sports
Major League Baseball 2K9	March 24, 2009	Unreleased	July 9, 2009	Unreleased	2K Sports	2K Sports
Major League Baseball 2K10	March 2, 2010	Unreleased	August 26, 2010	Unreleased	Visual Concepts	2K Sports
Major League Baseball 2K11	March 8, 2011	Unreleased	May 12, 2011	Unreleased	2K China	2K Sports
Major League Baseball 2K12	March 6, 2012	Unreleased	April 26, 2012	Unreleased	Visual Concepts	2K Sports
Majo-Ou	Unreleased	Unreleased	July 31, 2014	Unreleased	QuinRose	QuinRose
Makiwari 2	Unreleased	Unreleased	April 22, 2010	Unreleased	SCEI	SCEI
Mana Khemia: Student Alliance	March 10, 2009	March 27, 2009	September 25, 2008	Unreleased	Gust Corporation	Nippon Ichi Software
Mana Khemia 2: Ochita Gakuen to Renkinjutsushi Tachi Portable+	Unreleased	Unreleased	October 1, 2010	Unreleased	Gust Corporation	Nippon Ichi Software
Manhunt 2	October 29, 2007	October 31, 2008	Unreleased	Unreleased	Rockstar Leeds	Rockstar Games
Maou	Unreleased	Unreleased	April 22, 2010	Unreleased	SCEI	SCEI
Marriage Royale: Prism Story	Unreleased	Unreleased	April 28, 2010	Unreleased	ASCII Media Works	ASCII Media Works
Marvel Nemesis: Rise of the Imperfects	October 4, 2005	October 28, 2005	Unreleased	Unreleased	EA Canada	Electronic Arts
Marvel Super Hero Squad	October 20, 2009	October 23, 2009	Unreleased	June 24, 2010	Blue Tongue Entertainment / Mass Media	THQ
Marvel Trading Card Game	February 2, 2007	June 8, 2007	Unreleased	July 6, 2007	Vicious Cycle Software	Konami
Marvel: Ultimate Alliance	October 24, 2006	December 1, 2006	Unreleased	December 6, 2006	Vicarious Visions	Activision
Marvel: Ultimate Alliance 2	September 22, 2009	November 6, 2009	Unreleased	Unreleased	Savage Entertainment	Activision
Mashiro Iro Symphony: *mutsu-no-hana	Unreleased	Unreleased	June 30, 2011	Unreleased	Comfort	Comfort
Me & My Katamari	March 21, 2006	May 12, 2006	December 22, 2005	2006	Namco	Namco
Medal of Honor: Heroes	October 20, 2006	November 24, 2006	February 8, 2007	November 9, 2006	EA Canada	Electronic Arts
Medal of Honor: Heroes 2	November 13, 2007	November 30, 2007	February 14, 2008	November 29, 2007	EA Canada	Electronic Arts
Medical 91 for Portable	Unreleased	Unreleased	June 12, 2008	Unreleased	Takuyo	Takuyo
MediEvil: Resurrection	September 13, 2005	September 1, 2005	Unreleased	Unreleased	SCE Studio Cambridge	SCEE / SCEA
Mega Man Maverick Hunter X	January 31, 2006	March 3, 2006	December 15, 2005	Unreleased	Capcom	Capcom
Mega Man Powered Up	March 14, 2006	March 24, 2006	March 2, 2006	Unreleased	Capcom	Capcom
Megami no Etsubo	Unreleased	Unreleased	March 30, 2006	Unreleased	Ertain	Ertain
Megamind: The Blue Defender	November 2, 2010	November 26, 2010	Unreleased	Unreleased	Tantalus Media	THQ
Megpoid the Music #	Unreleased	Unreleased	March 28, 2013	Unreleased	ParaPhray	ParaPhray
Meiji Tokyo Renka	Unreleased	Unreleased	September 26, 2013	Unreleased	HuneX	Broccoli
Meiji Tokyo Renka: Twilight Kiss	Unreleased	Unreleased	April 23, 2015	Unreleased	HuneX	Broccoli
Meitantei Conan: Kakokara no Zensou Kyoku	Unreleased	Unreleased	April 19, 2012	Unreleased	Bandai Namco Games	Bandai Namco Games
Memories Off	Unreleased	Unreleased	May 29, 2008	Unreleased	CyberFront	CyberFront
Memories Off #5: Encore	Unreleased	Unreleased	September 17, 2009	Unreleased	5pb	5pb
Memories Off #5: Togireta Film	Unreleased	Unreleased	January 29, 2009	Unreleased	5pb	5pb
Memories Off 2nd	Unreleased	Unreleased	May 29, 2008	Unreleased	5pb	CyberFront
Memories Off 6: Next Relation	Unreleased	Unreleased	October 14, 2010	Unreleased	5pb	5pb
Memories Off 6: T-Wave	Unreleased	Unreleased	May 28, 2009	Unreleased	5pb	5pb
Memories Off: AfterRain	Unreleased	Unreleased	June 25, 2009	Unreleased	5pb	5pb
Memories Off: Sorekara	Unreleased	Unreleased	August 14, 2008	Unreleased	5pb	5pb
Memories Off: Sorekara Again	Unreleased	Unreleased	September 17, 2009	Unreleased	5pb	5pb
Memories Off: Yubikiri no Kioku	Unreleased	Unreleased	May 26, 2011	Unreleased	5pb	5pb
Mercury Meltdown	October 3, 2006	October 6, 2006	August 24, 2006	September 28, 2006	Ignition Banbury	Ignition Entertainment
Mermaid Gothic	Unreleased	Unreleased	November 20, 2014	Unreleased	QuinRose	QuinRose
Meta Juice	Unreleased	Unreleased	February 28, 2006	Unreleased	Cinepix	Cinepix
Metal Fight Beyblade Portable: Chouzetsu Tensei! Vulcan Horuseus	Unreleased	Unreleased	October 27, 2010	Unreleased	Takara Tomy	Takara Tomy
Metal Gear Acid	March 24, 2005	September 1, 2005	December 16, 2004	Unreleased	KCEJ	Konami
Metal Gear Acid 2	March 21, 2006	May 19, 2006	December 8, 2005	Unreleased	Kojima Productions	Konami
Metal Gear Solid: Digital Graphic Novel (Note: Primarily an interactive graphic novel, though it includes the Memory Map logic puzzle, in which players connect related information collected from comic panels to unlock additional information and artwork.)	June 13, 2006	September 22, 2006	September 21, 2006	May 2008	Kojima Productions	Konami
Metal Gear Solid: Portable Ops	December 5, 2006	May 25, 2007	December 21, 2006	May 15, 2007	Kojima Productions	Konami
Metal Gear Solid: Portable Ops Plus (Note: Stand-alone expansion for Metal Gear Solid: Portable Ops.)	November 13, 2007	March 28, 2008	September 20, 2007	April 11, 2008	Kojima Productions	Konami
Metal Gear Solid: Peace Walker	June 8, 2010	June 18, 2010	April 29, 2010	June 17, 2010	Kojima Productions	Konami
Metal Slug Anthology	February 20, 2007	February 9, 2007	February 22, 2007	April 26, 2007	Terminal Reality	Atari / SNK Playmore
Metal Slug XX	February 23, 2010	June 25, 2010	December 23, 2009	Unreleased	SNK Playmore	Ignition Entertainment
Miami Vice: The Game	July 18, 2006	July 21, 2006	August 31, 2006	Unreleased	Rebellion Developments	Sierra Entertainment
Michael Jackson: The Experience	November 23, 2010	November 26, 2010	Unreleased	Unreleased	Triumph International	Ubisoft
Micro Machines V4	June 27, 2006	June 30, 2006	Unreleased	Unreleased	Supersonic Software	Codemasters
Midnight Club 3: DUB Edition	June 27, 2005	September 1, 2005	Unreleased	Unreleased	Rockstar Leeds	Rockstar Games
Midnight Club: L.A. Remix	October 20, 2008	October 24, 2008	February 5, 2009	October 24, 2008	Rockstar London	Rockstar Games
Midway Arcade Treasures: Extended Play	December 13, 2005	February 24, 2006	Unreleased	Unreleased	Digital Eclipse	Midway Games
Military History: Commander - Europe at War	December 6, 2010	March 20, 2009	Unreleased	Unreleased	Slitherine Strategies	Slitherine Strategies
Mimana Iyar Chronicle	March 30, 2010	Unreleased	February 26, 2009	Unreleased	Kogado Studio	Aksys Games
Mind Quiz	October 31, 2006	November 17, 2006	Unreleased	November 16, 2006	Sega	Ubisoft
Minna no Golf Jou Vol.1	Unreleased	Unreleased	May 31, 2007	Unreleased	Sony Computer Entertainment	Sony Computer Entertainment
Minna no Golf Jou Vol.2	Unreleased	Unreleased	August 2, 2007	Unreleased	Sony Computer Entertainment	Sony Computer Entertainment
Minna no Golf Jou Vol.3	Unreleased	Unreleased	October 4, 2007	Unreleased	Sony Computer Entertainment	Sony Computer Entertainment
Minna no Golf Jou Vol.4	Unreleased	Unreleased	November 8, 2007	Unreleased	Sony Computer Entertainment	Sony Computer Entertainment
Minna No Golf Jou: Ball Hiroi	Unreleased	Unreleased	April 20, 2011	Unreleased	SCEJ	SCEJ
Minna no Golf Portable: Coca-Cola Special Edition	Unreleased	Unreleased	June 1, 2005	Unreleased	Sony Computer Entertainment	Sony Computer Entertainment
Mirai Nikki: 13-ninme no Nikki Shoyuusha	Unreleased	Unreleased	January 28, 2010	Unreleased	Kadokawa	Kadokawa
Mirai Nikki: 13-ninme no Nikki Shoyuusha Re-Write (Note: Update for Mirai Nikki: 13-ninme no Nikki Shoyuusha.)	Unreleased	Unreleased	April 26, 2012	Unreleased	Kadokawa	Kadokawa
Misshitsu no Sacrifice	Unreleased	Unreleased	February 4, 2010	Unreleased	Intense	D3 Publisher
Misshitsu no Sacrifice Jitka: Aru Heisa Shisetsu kara no Dasshutsu	Unreleased	Unreleased	October 21, 2010	Unreleased	Intense	D3 Publisher
Misshitsu no Sacrifice: Miki High Tension Night	Unreleased	Unreleased	April 21, 2011	Unreleased	Intense	D3 Publisher
Missing Parts the Tantei Stories Complete	Unreleased	Unreleased	November 29, 2012	Unreleased	Fog	Nippon Ichi Software
Mite Kiite Nou de Kanjite Crossword Tengoku	Unreleased	Unreleased	January 25, 2007	Unreleased	Sega	Sega
Miyako	Unreleased	Unreleased	November 25, 2010	Unreleased	Sanctuary	Idea Factory
Miyako: Awayuki no Utage	Unreleased	Unreleased	April 19, 2012	Unreleased	Sanctuary	Idea Factory
Mizu no Senritsu Portable	Unreleased	Unreleased	December 24, 2009	Unreleased	Kid	CyberFront
Mizu no Senritsu Portable 2: Hi no Kioku	Unreleased	Unreleased	February 25, 2010	Unreleased	CyberFront	CyberFront
MLB	April 12, 2005	Unreleased	Unreleased	Unreleased	989 Studios	SCEA
MLB 06: The Show	March 28, 2006	Unreleased	Unreleased	Unreleased	San Diego Studio	SCEA
MLB 07: The Show	February 27, 2007	Unreleased	Unreleased	Unreleased	San Diego Studio	SCEA
MLB 08: The Show	March 4, 2008	Unreleased	Unreleased	Unreleased	San Diego Studio	SCEA
MLB 09: The Show	March 3, 2009	Unreleased	Unreleased	Unreleased	San Diego Studio	SCEA
MLB 10: The Show	March 2, 2010	Unreleased	Unreleased	Unreleased	San Diego Studio	SCEA
MLB 11: The Show	March 8, 2011	Unreleased	Unreleased	Unreleased	San Diego Studio	SCEA
Mobile Train Simulator + Densha de GO! Tokyo Kyuukou Hen	Unreleased	Unreleased	February 17, 2005	Unreleased	Ongakukan	Ongakukan
Mobile Train Simulator: Keisei - Toei Asakusa - Keikyuusen	Unreleased	Unreleased	February 23, 2006	Unreleased	Ongakukan	Ongakukan
ModNation Racers	May 25, 2010	May 19, 2010	July 29, 2010	May 19, 2010	San Diego Studio	Sony Computer Entertainment
Moe Moe 2-Ji Daisenryaku 2	Unreleased	Unreleased	February 4, 2010	Unreleased	SystemSoft	SystemSoft
Moe Moe 2-ji Daisenryaku Deluxe	Unreleased	Unreleased	November 27, 2008	Unreleased	SystemSoft	SystemSoft
Moe Moe Daisensou * Gendaiban+	Unreleased	Unreleased	September 1, 2011	Unreleased	SystemSoft	SystemSoft
Moegaku @ Portable	Unreleased	Unreleased	September 14, 2006	Unreleased	Studio Sagittarius	Idea Factory
Moeru Mahjong: Moejong!	Unreleased	Unreleased	October 23, 2008	Unreleased	Hudson Soft	Hudson Soft
Momotarou Dentetsu Tag Match: Yuujou - Doryoku - Shouri no Maki!	Unreleased	Unreleased	July 15, 2010	Unreleased	Hudson Soft	Hudson Soft
Monochrome	Unreleased	Unreleased	April 8, 2010	Unreleased	Kid	CyberFront
Monster Bass	November 25, 2011	Unreleased	Unreleased	Unreleased	Magical Company (Mahou)	SCEA
Monster Hunter Freedom	May 23, 2006	May 12, 2006	December 1, 2005	May 26, 2006	Capcom	Capcom
Monster Hunter Freedom 2	August 28, 2007	September 7, 2007	February 22, 2007	September 12, 2007	Capcom	Capcom
Monster Hunter Portable 3	Unreleased	Unreleased	December 1, 2010	Unreleased	Capcom Production Studio 1	Capcom
Monster Hunter Freedom Unite (Note: Update for Monster Hunter Freedom 2.)	June 22, 2009	June 26, 2009	March 27, 2008	June 25, 2009	Capcom	Capcom
Monster Hunter Diary: Poka Poka Airu Village	Unreleased	Unreleased	August 26, 2010	Unreleased	FromSoftware	Capcom
Monster Hunter Diary Poka Poka Airu Village G (Note: Update for Monster Hunter Diary: Poka Poka Airu Village.)	Unreleased	Unreleased	August 26, 2010	Unreleased	FromSoftware	Capcom
Monster Jam: Urban Assault	October 28, 2008	March 13, 2009	Unreleased	Unreleased	Torus Games	Activision
Monster Jam: Path of Destruction	November 8, 2010	Unreleased	Unreleased	Unreleased	Torus Games	Activision
Monster Kingdom: Jewel Summoner	February 19, 2007	Unreleased	February 23, 2006	Unreleased	Gaia	Atlus
Mortal Kombat: Unchained	November 15, 2006	November 24, 2006	Unreleased	November 9, 2006	JGI Entertainment	Midway Games
Mother Goose no Himitsu no Yakata	Unreleased	Unreleased	June 23, 2011	Unreleased	QuinRose	QuinRose
Mother Goose no Himitsu no Yakata: Blue Label	Unreleased	Unreleased	November 17, 2011	Unreleased	QuinRose	QuinRose
MotoGP	September 26, 2006	October 26, 2006	August 24, 2006	Unreleased	Namco Bandai Games	Namco Bandai Games
MotorStorm: Arctic Edge	September 29, 2009	September 18, 2009	September 17, 2009	November 1, 2009	Bigbig Studios	SCEE / SCEA
Motto Nee, Chanto Shiyou yo! +Plus	Unreleased	Unreleased	May 29, 2014	Unreleased	Candy Soft	NetRevo
Motto Nuga-Cel!	Unreleased	Unreleased	May 20, 2010	Unreleased	Lupinus	Idea Factory
Moujuutsukai to Oujisama Portable	Unreleased	Unreleased	June 30, 2011	Unreleased	Otomate	Idea Factory
Moujuutsukai to Oujisama: Snow Bride Portable	Unreleased	Unreleased	February 23, 2012	Unreleased	Otomate	Idea Factory
MTX Mototrax	June 28, 2006	February 9, 2007	Unreleased	Unreleased	Left Field Productions	Activision
Musketeer: Le Sang des Chevaliers	Unreleased	Unreleased	July 7, 2011	Unreleased	Otomate	Idea Factory
Muso Toro	Unreleased	Unreleased	March 19, 2009	Unreleased	FOG	Nippon Ichi Software
Musou Orochi 2: Special	Unreleased	Unreleased	July 19, 2012	Unreleased	Omega Force	Koei
MVP Baseball	May 18, 2005	Unreleased	Unreleased	Unreleased	EA Canada	Electronic Arts
MX vs. ATV: On the Edge	February 27, 2006	March 17, 2006	Unreleased	Unreleased	Rainbow Studios	THQ
MX vs. ATV: Reflex	December 1, 2009	February 5, 2010	Unreleased	December 17, 2009	Rainbow Studios	THQ
MX vs. ATV: Untamed	December 17, 2007	March 7, 2008	Unreleased	March 13, 2008	Rainbow Studios	THQ
My Spanish Coach	October 7, 2008	Unreleased	Unreleased	Unreleased	Sensory Sweep Studios	Ubisoft
My Merry May with be	Unreleased	Unreleased	March 25, 2010	Unreleased	CyberFront	CyberFront
The My Taxi!	Unreleased	Unreleased	February 22, 2007	Unreleased	Tamsoft	D3 Publisher
Myst	July 19, 2009	October 13, 2006	June 15, 2006	Unreleased	Hoplite Research	Midway Games
The Mystery Team	Unreleased	December 1, 2011	Unreleased	Unreleased	Tonika Games	SCEE
Mystereet Portable	Unreleased	Unreleased	April 24, 2008	Unreleased	Views	Views
Mystic Chronicles	July 16, 2013	January 29, 2014	September 4, 2012	Unreleased	Hit-Point Co., Ltd.	Natsume Inc.
Mytran Wars	October 26, 2009	April 17, 2009	Unreleased	Unreleased	StormRegion	Deep Silver
N+	August 26, 2008	Unreleased	Unreleased	Unreleased	SilverBirch Studios	Atari
Namco Museum Battle Collection	August 23, 2005	December 9, 2005	February 23, 2006	Unreleased	Namco	Namco
Nana: Subete wa Daimaou no Omichibiki!?	Unreleased	Unreleased	July 6, 2006	Unreleased	Konami	Konami
Nanatama: Chronicle of Dungeon Maker	Unreleased	Unreleased	February 23, 2009	Unreleased	Global A Entertainment	Global A Entertainment
Nanodiver	Unreleased	Unreleased	September 1, 2011	Unreleased	Premium Agency	Takara Tomy
Napoleon Dynamite: The Game	October 23, 2007	Unreleased	Unreleased	Unreleased	7 Studios	Crave Entertainment
Naraku no Shiro Portable	Unreleased	Unreleased	December 17, 2009	Unreleased	Fog	Nippon Ichi Software
Narcissus: Moshimo Ashita ga Aru Nara	Unreleased	Unreleased	June 24, 2010	Unreleased	Regista	Kadokawa
Narisokonai Eiyuutan: Taiyou to Tsuki no Monogatari	Unreleased	Unreleased	July 23, 2009	Unreleased	Irem	Irem
Naruto Shippuden - Kizuna Drive	March 22, 2011	March 25, 2011	July 15, 2010	March 31, 2011	Namco Bandai Games	Namco Bandai Games
Naruto Shippuden: Legends: Akatsuki Rising	October 6, 2009	September 24, 2009	Unreleased	October 2, 2009	Racjin	Namco Bandai Games
Naruto: Ultimate Ninja Heroes	October 18, 2011	November 11, 2011	October 18, 2011	November 24, 2011	Namco Bandai Games	Namco Bandai Games
Naruto: Ultimate Ninja Heroes 2: The Phantom Fortress	June 24, 2008	July 11, 2008	March 30, 2006	August 7, 2008	CyberConnect2	Namco Bandai Games
Naruto Shippuden: Ultimate Ninja Heroes 3	May 11, 2010	May 14, 2010	December 10, 2009	May 20, 2010	CyberConnect2	Namco Bandai Games
Naruto Shippuden: Ultimate Ninja Impact	October 18, 2011	May 20, 2010	May 20, 2010	May 20, 2010	CyberConnect2	Namco Bandai Games
NASCAR	September 6, 2006	October 6, 2006	Unreleased	Unreleased	EA Tiburon	EA Sports
Natsuzora no Monologue Portable	Unreleased	Unreleased	March 20, 2013	Unreleased	Otomate	Idea Factory
Naval Ops: Warship Gunner 2	Unreleased	Unreleased	November 12, 2009	Unreleased	Koei	Koei
NBA	March 24, 2005	Unreleased	Unreleased	Unreleased	989 Studios	SCEA
NBA 06	October 4, 2005	Unreleased	Unreleased	Unreleased	San Diego Studio	SCEA
NBA 07	September 25, 2006	Unreleased	Unreleased	Unreleased	San Diego Studio	SCEA
NBA 08	October 12, 2007	Unreleased	Unreleased	Unreleased	San Diego Studio	SCEA
NBA 09: The Inside	October 7, 2008	Unreleased	Unreleased	Unreleased	San Diego Studio	SCEA
NBA 10: The Inside	October 6, 2009	Unreleased	Unreleased	Unreleased	San Diego Studio	SCEA
NBA 2K10	October 6, 2009	October 30, 2009	October 15, 2009	October 23, 2009	Visual Concepts	2K Sports
NBA 2K11	October 5, 2010	October 8, 2010	October 14, 2010	Unreleased	Visual Concepts	2K Sports
NBA 2K12	October 4, 2011	October 7, 2011	October 27, 2011	October 7, 2011	Visual Concepts	2K Sports
NBA 2K13	October 2, 2012	October 5, 2012	November 1, 2012	October 5, 2012	Visual Concepts	2K Sports
NBA Ballers: Rebound	May 9, 2006	September 29, 2006	Unreleased	September 28, 2006	Backbone Entertainment	Midway Games
NBA Live 06	October 4, 2005	October 20, 2005	December 15, 2005	Unreleased	EA Canada	EA Sports
NBA Live 07	September 25, 2006	October 6, 2006	December 21, 2006	October 6, 2006	EA Canada	EA Sports
NBA Live 08	October 1, 2007	December 7, 2007	November 8, 2007	December 6, 2007	EA Canada	EA Sports
NBA Live 09	October 7, 2008	October 10, 2008	October 23, 2008	October 9, 2008	EA Canada	EA Sports
NBA Live 10	October 6, 2009	October 9, 2009	November 5, 2009	October 15, 2009	EA Canada	EA Sports
NBA Street Showdown	April 27, 2005	September 1, 2005	September 29, 2005	Unreleased	EA Canada	EA Sports BIG
NCAA Football 07	July 18, 2006	Unreleased	Unreleased	Unreleased	EA Tiburon	EA Sports
NCAA Football 09	July 15, 2008	Unreleased	Unreleased	Unreleased	EA Canada	EA Sports
NCAA Football 10	July 14, 2009	Unreleased	Unreleased	Unreleased	EA Tiburon	EA Sports
Need for Speed: Carbon – Own the City	October 31, 2006	November 3, 2006	December 21, 2006	November 9, 2006	EA Black Box	Electronic Arts
Need for Speed: Most Wanted: 5-1-0	November 15, 2005	November 25, 2005	December 22, 2005	Unreleased	EA Black Box	Electronic Arts
Need for Speed: ProStreet	February 18, 2008	February 22, 2008	March 19, 2008	February 28, 2008	EA Black Box	Electronic Arts
Need for Speed: Shift	September 15, 2009	September 18, 2009	November 12, 2009	September 24, 2009	EA Bright Light	Electronic Arts
Need for Speed: Undercover	November 17, 2008	November 21, 2008	December 18, 2008	November 20, 2008	EA Black Box	Electronic Arts
Need for Speed: Underground Rivals	March 24, 2005	September 1, 2005	February 24, 2005	Unreleased	EA Black Box	Electronic Arts
Nendoroid Generations	Unreleased	Unreleased	February 23, 2012	Unreleased	Namco Bandai Games	Namco Bandai Games
Neo Angelique Special	Unreleased	Unreleased	September 20, 2008	Unreleased	Koei Tecmo Games	Koei Tecmo Games
Neo Geo Heroes: Ultimate Shooting	December 6, 2010	December 8, 2010	July 29, 2010	Unreleased	Moss	SNK Playmore
Neopets: Petpet Adventures: The Wand of Wishing	March 14, 2006	Unreleased	Unreleased	Unreleased	Santa Monica Studio	SCEA
Never 7: The End of Infinity	Unreleased	Unreleased	March 12, 2009	Unreleased	CyberFront	CyberFront
Neverland Card Battles	October 27, 2008	Unreleased	October 30, 2008	Unreleased	Idea Factory	Yuke's
NFL Street 2: Unleashed	March 24, 2005	September 1, 2005	Unreleased	Unreleased	EA Canada	EA Sports BIG
NFL Street 3	November 14, 2006	Unreleased	Unreleased	Unreleased	EA Tiburon	EA Sports BIG
NHL 07	September 12, 2006	September 22, 2006	Unreleased	October 20, 2006	EA Canada	Electronic Arts
NHRA Drag Racing: Countdown to the Championship	August 27, 2007	Unreleased	Unreleased	Unreleased	Pipeworks Software	THQ
Nichijou: Uchuujin	Unreleased	Unreleased	July 28, 2011	Unreleased	Kadokawa	Kadokawa
Nikoli no Sudoku +2 Dai-Is-Shuu: Sudoku - Nurikabe - Heyawake	Unreleased	Unreleased	November 25, 2010	Unreleased	Hamster	Hamster
Nikoli no Sudoku +3 Dai-Ni-Shuu: Sudoku - Kakuro - Bijutsukan - Hitori ni Shitekure	Unreleased	Unreleased	January 13, 2011	Unreleased	Hamster	Hamster
Nikoli no Sudoku +3 Dai-San-Shuu: Sudoku - Slither Link - Masyu - Yajilin	Unreleased	Unreleased	March 10, 2011	Unreleased	Hamster	Hamster
Nikoli no Sudoku +3 Dai-Yon-Shuu: Sudoku - Number Link - Shikaku ni Kire - Hashi o Kakero	Unreleased	Unreleased	June 9, 2011	Unreleased	Hamster	Hamster
Ninja Katsugeki: Tenchu Kurenai Portable	Unreleased	Unreleased	January 28, 2010	Unreleased	From Software	From Software
Ninja Katsugeki: Tenchu San Portable	Unreleased	Unreleased	August 27, 2009	Unreleased	From Software	From Software
Ninki Pro Wrestler	Unreleased	Unreleased	April 20, 2011	Unreleased	SCEJ	SCEJ
Nippon no Asoko de	Unreleased	Unreleased	May 1, 2008	Unreleased	SCEI	SCEI
Nise no Chigiri	Unreleased	Unreleased	August 26, 2010	Unreleased	Otomate	Idea Factory
Nise no Chigiri: Omoide no Saki e	Unreleased	Unreleased	July 21, 2011	Unreleased	Otomate	Idea Factory
Nishimura Kyoutarou Travel Mystery: Akugyaku no Kisetsu Tokyo Nanki Shirahama Renzoku Satsujin Jiken	Unreleased	Unreleased	June 4, 2009	Unreleased	Marvelous Entertainment	Marvelous Entertainment
No Fate! Only the Power of Will	Unreleased	Unreleased	February 25, 2010	Unreleased	Alchemist	Alchemist
No Gravity: The Plague of Mind	February 26, 2009	March 5, 2009	Unreleased	Unreleased	Realtech VR	Anozor
No Heroes Allowed! Yuusha no Kuse ni Namaikida: 3D	November 1, 2010	November 3, 2010	March 11, 2010	Unreleased	Acquire	SCEA
Nobunaga no Yabou: Reppuuden; Nobunaga no Yabou: Reppuuden with Power Up Kit	Unreleased	Unreleased	March 16, 2006	Unreleased	Koei	Koei
Nobunaga no Yabou: Shouseiroku	Unreleased	Unreleased	December 22, 2005	Unreleased	Koei	Koei
Nobunaga no Yabou: Soutenroku	Unreleased	Unreleased	August 4, 2011	Unreleased	Koei	Koei
Nobunaga no Yabou: Tenshouki	Unreleased	Unreleased	September 1, 2005	Unreleased	Koei	Koei
Nogizaka Haruka no Himitsu: Doujinshi Hajimemashita	Unreleased	Unreleased	October 28, 2010	Unreleased	ASCII Media Works	ASCII Media Works
Norn9: Norn + Nonette	Unreleased	Unreleased	May 30, 2013	Unreleased	Otomate	Idea Factory
Nou ni Kaikan: Aha Taiken	Unreleased	Unreleased	June 22, 2006	Unreleased	Sega	Sega
Nou ni Kaikan: Minna de Aha Taiken!	Unreleased	Unreleased	November 30, 2006	Unreleased	Sega	Sega
Nozomi Kanaetamae: Daydream Reconstruct	Unreleased	Unreleased	August 21, 2012	Unreleased	Vallel	Hopemoon
Numblast; Qruton	November 5, 2009	July 2, 2009	June 18, 2009	July 2, 2009	SCEI	SCEI
Numpla 10000-Mon	Unreleased	Unreleased	April 10, 2008	Unreleased	Blackjack	Success
Magic Sudoku; Numpla & Oekaki Puzzle	Unreleased	May 23, 2008	August 10, 2006	Unreleased	Blackjack	Success
O*G*A Onigokko Royale: Hunter wa Kotou de Koiosuru	Unreleased	Unreleased	July 18, 2013	Unreleased	Idea Factory	Idea Factory
Obscure: The Aftermath	October 13, 2009	October 9, 2009	Unreleased	October 22, 2009	Hydravision Entertainment	Ignition Entertainment
Okashi na Shima no Peter Pan: Sweet Never Land	Unreleased	Unreleased	October 6, 2011	Unreleased	QuinRose	QuinRose
Omerta: Chinmoku no Okite - The Legacy	Unreleased	Unreleased	November 20, 2014	Unreleased	Karin Chatnoir Omega	Karin Entertainment
Omochabako no Kuni no Alice: Wonderful Wonder World	Unreleased	Unreleased	December 22, 2011	Unreleased	QuinRose	QuinRose
Omoi no Kakera: Close To	Unreleased	Unreleased	December 22, 2011	Unreleased	CyberFront	CyberFront
Omoide ni Kawaru-Kimi: Memories Off	Unreleased	Unreleased	August 14, 2008	Unreleased	5pb	CyberFront
One Piece : Romance Dawn	Unreleased	Unreleased	December 20, 2012	Unreleased	Namco Bandai Games	Namco Bandai Games
Onechanbara Special	Unreleased	Unreleased	March 31, 2011	Unreleased	Tamsoft	D3 Publisher
Onigokko! Portable	Unreleased	Unreleased	June 27, 2013	Unreleased	Alcot	Alchemist
Online Chess Kingdoms	November 28, 2006	February 9, 2007	Unreleased	February 2007	Konami	Konami
Onore no Shinzuru Michi o Yuke	Unreleased	Unreleased	June 11, 2009	Unreleased	Silicon Studio	From Software
Ooedo Senryoubako	Unreleased	Unreleased	February 23, 2006	Unreleased	Taito	Taito
Ookami Kakushi	Unreleased	Unreleased	August 20, 2009	Unreleased	Konami	Konami
Open Season	September 19, 2006	October 6, 2006	Unreleased	Unreleased	Ubisoft Montreal	Ubisoft
Ore ni Hatarakette Iwaretemo	Unreleased	Unreleased	April 24, 2012	Unreleased	e-smile	e-smile
Ore ni Hatarakette Iwaretemo Otsu (Note: Update for Ore ni Hatarakette Iwaretemo.)	Unreleased	Unreleased	April 24, 2013	Unreleased	e-smile	e-smile
Ore no Dungeon	Unreleased	Unreleased	November 30, 2006	Unreleased	Climax Entertainment	Sega
Ore no Imoto ga Konna ni Kawaii Wake ga Nai Portable	Unreleased	Unreleased	January 27, 2011	Unreleased	Bandai Namco Games	Bandai Namco Games
Ore no Imoto ga Konna ni Kawaii Wake ga Nai Portable ga Tsuzuku Wake ga Nai	Unreleased	Unreleased	May 17, 2012	Unreleased	Bandai Namco Games	Bandai Namco Games
Ore no Kanojo no Uraomote: Pure Sweet Heart	Unreleased	Unreleased	December 19, 2013	Unreleased	Aries	Alchemist
Ore no Shikabane wo Koete Yuke	Unreleased	Unreleased	November 10, 2011	Unreleased	Alfa System	SCEI
Ore wa Shoujo Mangaka	Unreleased	Unreleased	February 23, 2013	Unreleased	Giza10	Giza10
Oretachi no Sabage Portable	Unreleased	Unreleased	October 25, 2008	Unreleased	Best Media	Best Media
Oretachi no Sabage Versus	Unreleased	Unreleased	August 5, 2010	Unreleased	Best Media	Best Media
Othello	Unreleased	Unreleased	March 25, 2010	Unreleased	Arc System Works	Arc System Works
Otome wa Boku ni Koishiteru Portable	Unreleased	Unreleased	April 29, 2010	Unreleased	Alchemist	Alchemist
Otome wa Boku ni Koishiteru Portable: Futari no Elder	Unreleased	Unreleased	April 28, 2011	Unreleased	Alchemist	Alchemist
Otometeki Koi Kakumei * Love Revo! Portable	Unreleased	Unreleased	May 20, 2010	Unreleased	HuneX	Idea Factory
Otometeki Koi Kakumei * Love Revo!! 100 kg Kara Hajimaru Koi Monogatari (Note: Update for Otometeki Koi Kakumei * Love Revo! Portable.)	Unreleased	Unreleased	January 17, 2013	Unreleased	HuneX	Idea Factory
Ouka Sengoku Portable	Unreleased	Unreleased	July 5, 2012	Unreleased	Apricot	Alchemist
Oumagatoki: Kaidan Romance	Unreleased	Unreleased	March 29, 2012	Unreleased	QuinRose	QuinRose
OutRun 2006: Coast 2 Coast	April 25, 2006	March 31, 2006	Unreleased	April 6, 2006	Sumo Digital	Sega
Over the Hedge: Hammy Goes Nuts!	November 21, 2006	February 16, 2007	Unreleased	Unreleased	Amaze Entertainment	Activision
P-Kara	Unreleased	Unreleased	December 14, 2006	Unreleased	Sony Computer Entertainment	Sony Computer Entertainment
Pac-Man World 3	December 6, 2005	June 2, 2006	Unreleased	Unreleased	Blitz Games	Namco
Pac-Man World Rally	August 22, 2006	August 24, 2007	Unreleased	Unreleased	Smart Bomb Interactive	Namco Bandai Games
Pachinka Mania P: CR Tekkenden Tough	Unreleased	Unreleased	September 16, 2010	Unreleased	Dorart	Dorart
PachiPara Slot + Pachi-Slot Daiku no Gen-San: Ikuze! Honoo no Gen-Matsuri-Hen	Unreleased	Unreleased	January 24, 2013	Unreleased	Irem	Irem
PachiPara Slot: Pachi-Slot Super Umi Monogatari in Okinawa	Unreleased	Unreleased	May 26, 2011	Unreleased	Irem	Irem
PangYa: Fantasy Golf	June 23, 2009	Unreleased	April 16, 2009	Unreleased	Ntreev Soft	Takara Tomy
Panic Palette Portable	Unreleased	Unreleased	August 31, 2008	Unreleased	Takuyo	Takuyo
PaRappa the Rapper	July 17, 2007	July 6, 2007	December 7, 2006	August 9, 2007	SCE Studios Japan	SCEI / SCEE / SCEA
Parodius Portable	Unreleased	Unreleased	January 25, 2007	Unreleased	Konami	Konami
Pastel Chime Continue	Unreleased	Unreleased	December 9, 2010	Unreleased	Alice Soft	5pb
Patapon	February 26, 2008	February 22, 2008	December 20, 2007	February 28, 2008	SCE Studios Japan	SCEI / SCEE / SCEA
Patapon 2	May 5, 2009	March 6, 2009	November 27, 2008	March 6, 2009	SCE Studios Japan	SCEI / SCEE / SCEA
Patapon 3	April 12, 2011	April 15, 2011	April 28, 2011	Unreleased	Pyramid/ Sony	Sony
Patchwork Heroes; Hyakumanton no Bara Bara	March 17, 2010	March 18, 2008	February 18, 2010	Unreleased	Acquire	SCEI / SCEE / SCEA
Patlabor: Come Back Mini-Pato	Unreleased	Unreleased	November 2, 2005	Unreleased	Bandai	Bandai
Payout Poker & Casino	August 15, 2006	Unreleased	Unreleased	Unreleased	Bits Studios	Namco Bandai Games
PDC World Championship Darts 2008	June 16, 2009	September 26, 2008	Unreleased	Unreleased	Oxygen Studios	Oxygen Games
Peggle	November 15, 2010	Unreleased	Unreleased	Unreleased	PopCap	PopCap
Peter Jackson's King Kong: The Official Game of the Movie	December 20, 2005	December 16, 2005	Unreleased	December 20, 2005	Phoenix Studio	Ubisoft
Petz Hamsterz Bunch	October 27, 2009	June 19, 2009	December 18, 2008	Unreleased	Ubisoft	Ubisoft
Petz: Dogz Family	October 27, 2009	Unreleased	Unreleased	Unreleased	Ubisoft	Ubisoft
Petz: My Puppy Family	Unreleased	June 19, 2009	Unreleased	September 1, 2010	Ubisoft	Ubisoft
Petz: Saddle Club	October 27, 2009	Unreleased	Unreleased	Unreleased	Ubisoft	Ubisoft
Phantasy Star Portable	March 3, 2009	April 17, 2009	July 31, 2008	April 16, 2009	Alfa System	Sega
Phantasy Star Portable 2	September 14, 2010	September 17, 2010	December 3, 2009	September 16, 2010	Alfa System	Sega
Phantasy Star Portable 2 Infinity (Note: Update for Phantasy Star Portable 2.)	Unreleased	Unreleased	February 24, 2011	Unreleased	Alfa System	Sega
Phantom Brave: The Hermuda Triangle	March 8, 2011	March 9, 2011	October 28, 2010	Unreleased	Nippon Ichi Software	NIS America
Phantom Kingdom Portable	Unreleased	Unreleased	October 6, 2011	Unreleased	Nippon Ichi Software	Nippon Ichi Software
Phase Shift: Threats Beyond the Network	Unreleased	Unreleased	Unreleased	November 25, 2013	Dark Potato Studios	Dark Potato Studios
Phase-D: Akaki no Shou	Unreleased	Unreleased	April 26, 2012	Unreleased	Boost On	Boost On
Phase-D: Aohana no Shou	Unreleased	Unreleased	January 26, 2012	Unreleased	Boost On	Boost On
Phase-D: Kurosei no Shou	Unreleased	Unreleased	March 29, 2012	Unreleased	Boost On	Boost On
Phase-D: Shirokage no Shou	Unreleased	Unreleased	February 23, 2012	Unreleased	Boost On	Boost On
Phi Brain: Kizuna no Puzzle	Unreleased	Unreleased	May 31, 2012	Unreleased	Arc System Works	Arc System Works
Phineas and Ferb: Across the 2nd Dimension	November 27, 2012	October 31, 2012	Unreleased	Unreleased	Virtual Toys	Disney Interactive Studios
Photo Kano	Unreleased	Unreleased	February 2, 2012	Unreleased	Dingo Inc.	Kadokawa Games
Pia Carrot e Youkoso!! 4: Natsu no Kioku	Unreleased	Unreleased	October 25, 2012	Unreleased	GN Software	GN Software
Pia Carrot e Youkoso!! G.P. Gakuen Princess Portable	Unreleased	Unreleased	June 25, 2009	Unreleased	HuneX	GN Software
Pilot Academy	Unreleased	October 27, 2006	September 7, 2006	October 2006	Kuju Entertainment	Marvelous / Rising Star
Pimp My Ride	April 3, 2007	December 7, 2007	Unreleased	April 26, 2007	Eutechnyx	Activision
Pinball	Unreleased	Unreleased	September 29, 2005	Unreleased	Hudson Soft	Hudson Soft
Pinball Hall of Fame: The Gottlieb Collection	December 6, 2005	February 10, 2006	Unreleased	Unreleased	FarSight Studios	Crave Entertainment
Pinball Hall of Fame: The Williams Collection	February 26, 2008	August 14, 2009	Unreleased	Unreleased	FarSight Studios	Crave Entertainment
Pinball Heroes	November 12, 2009	Unreleased	Unreleased	Unreleased	San Diego Studio	SCEA
Pinball Heroes: Fat Princess (Note: DLC for Pinball Heroes. Also included in Pinball Heroes: Bundle 2.)	May 25, 2010	Unreleased	Unreleased	Unreleased	San Diego Studio	SCEA
Pinball Heroes: High Velocity Bowling (Note: DLC for Pinball Heroes.)	November 12, 2009	Unreleased	Unreleased	Unreleased	San Diego Studio	SCEA
Pinball Heroes: Hot Shots Golf (Note: DLC for Pinball Heroes.)	November 12, 2009	Unreleased	Unreleased	Unreleased	San Diego Studio	SCEA
Pinball Heroes: ModNation Racers (Note: DLC for Pinball Heroes. Also included in Pinball Heroes: Bundle 2.)	May 25, 2010	Unreleased	Unreleased	Unreleased	San Diego Studio	SCEA
Pinball Heroes: MotorStorm (Note: DLC for Pinball Heroes. Also included in Pinball Heroes: Bundle 2.)	May 25, 2010	Unreleased	Unreleased	Unreleased	San Diego Studio	SCEA
Pinball Heroes: PAIN (Note: DLC for Pinball Heroes.)	November 12, 2009	Unreleased	Unreleased	Unreleased	San Diego Studio	SCEA
Pinball Heroes: Uncharted: Drake's Fortune (Note: DLC for Pinball Heroes.)	November 12, 2009	Unreleased	Unreleased	Unreleased	San Diego Studio	SCEA
Pinball Heroes: WipEout HD Fury (Note: DLC for Pinball Heroes. Also included in Pinball Heroes: Bundle 2.)	May 25, 2010	Unreleased	Unreleased	Unreleased	San Diego Studio	SCEA
Pipe Mania	September 26, 2008	September 26, 2008	Unreleased	Unreleased	Empire Interactive	Empire Interactive
Pirates of the Caribbean: At World's End	May 22, 2007	May 25, 2007	Unreleased	May 24, 2007	Eurocom	Disney Interactive Studios
Pirates of the Caribbean: Dead Man's Chest	June 27, 2006	July 7, 2006	August 24, 2006	Unreleased	Griptonite Games	Buena Vista Games
PixelJunk Monsters Deluxe	April 27, 2010	Unreleased	Unreleased	Unreleased	Q-Games	Q-Games / SCEA / SCEE
Piyotama	Unreleased	Unreleased	July 26, 2010	Unreleased	SCE Japan Studio	SCEA
Planetarian: Chiisana Hoshi no Yume	Unreleased	Unreleased	September 28, 2009	Unreleased	Prototype	Prototype
Platypus	November 17, 2006	November 2006	Unreleased	Unreleased	Idigicon	MumboJumbo
PlayChapas: Football Edition	Unreleased	September 18, 2008	Unreleased	Unreleased	SCEE	SCEE
PlayEnglish	Unreleased	June 24, 2010	Unreleased	Unreleased	Tonika Games	SCEE
Plus Plumb 2 Again Portable	Unreleased	Unreleased	November 16, 2006	Unreleased	Takuyo	Takuyo
Pocket Pool	April 18, 2007	Unreleased	Unreleased	Unreleased	HyperDevbox Japan	Eidos / Conspiracy
Pocket Racers	November 14, 2006	September 15, 2006	Unreleased	Unreleased	Konami	Konami
Pool Hall Pro	June 14, 2011	Unreleased	Unreleased	Unreleased	Icon Games	Playlogic
Pop'n Music Portable	Unreleased	Unreleased	February 4, 2010	Unreleased	Konami	Konami
Pop'n Music Portable 2	Unreleased	Unreleased	November 23, 2011	Unreleased	Konami	Konami
PoPoLoCrois	November 29, 2005	June 16, 2006	February 10, 2005	Unreleased	SCEI	Agetec
Portable Island: Te no Hira no Resort	Unreleased	Unreleased	July 20, 2006	Unreleased	Bandai Namco Games	Bandai Namco Games
Power Pro Success Legends	Unreleased	Unreleased	February 25, 2010	Unreleased	Konami	Konami
Power Stone Collection	October 31, 2006	October 20, 2006	November 30, 2006	October 25, 2006	Capcom	Capcom
PQ: Practical Intelligence Quotient	January 10, 2006	July 14, 2006	May 26, 2005	Unreleased	Now Production	D3 Publisher
PQ2: Practical Intelligence Quotient 2	June 18, 2007	August 3, 2007	December 21, 2006	Unreleased	Now Production	D3 Publisher
Pri-Pia: Prince Pia Carrot	Unreleased	Unreleased	October 23, 2014	Unreleased	dramatic create	dramatic create
Pri-Saga! Portable	Unreleased	Unreleased	October 29, 2009	Unreleased	Abel Software	Abel Software
Prince of Persia: Revelations	December 6, 2005	December 16, 2005	Unreleased	Unreleased	Pipeworks Software	Ubisoft
Prince of Persia: Rival Swords	April 3, 2007	April 5, 2007	Unreleased	April 5, 2007	Pipeworks Software	Ubisoft
Prince Of Persia: The Forgotten Sands	May 18, 2010	May 20, 2010	Unreleased	Unreleased	Ubisoft Quebec	Ubisoft
Princess Arthur	Unreleased	Unreleased	March 28, 2013	Unreleased	Otomate	Idea Factory
Princess Crown	Unreleased	Unreleased	September 22, 2005	Unreleased	Atlus	Atlus
Princess Evangile Portable	Unreleased	Unreleased	April 12, 2012	Unreleased	Moonstone	CyberFront
Princess Frontier Portable	Unreleased	Unreleased	April 7, 2011	Unreleased	Alchemist	Alchemist
Princess Maker 4 Portable	Unreleased	Unreleased	October 12, 2006	Unreleased	Jinx	Jinx
Princess Maker 5 Portable	Unreleased	Unreleased	September 25, 2008	Unreleased	CyberFront	CyberFront
Prinny: Can I Really Be the Hero?	February 17, 2009	June 26, 2009	November 20, 2008	July 16, 2009	Nippon Ichi Software	Nippon Ichi Software
Prinny 2: Dawn of Operation Panties, Dood!	January 11, 2011	December 15, 2010	March 25, 2010	Unreleased	Nippon Ichi Software	Nippon Ichi Software
Pro Bull Riders: Out of the Chute	November 25, 2008	Unreleased	Unreleased	Unreleased	D2C Games	Crave
Pro Cycling Manager 2007	Unreleased	July 6, 2007	Unreleased	Unreleased	Cyanide	Focus Home Interactive
Pro Cycling Manager 2008	Unreleased	June 2008	Unreleased	Unreleased	Cyanide	Focus Home Interactive
Pro Cycling Manager 2009	Unreleased	July 10, 2009	Unreleased	Unreleased	Cyanide	Focus Home Interactive
Pro Cycling Manager 2010	Unreleased	July 9, 2010	Unreleased	Unreleased	Cyanide	Focus Home Interactive
Pro Evolution Soccer 5 World Soccer Winning Eleven 9	February 7, 2006	November 25, 2005	September 15, 2005	Unreleased	Konami	Konami
Pro Evolution Soccer 6 Pro Evolution Soccer 2007	February 6, 2007	December 1, 2006	December 14, 2006	December 8, 2006	Konami	Konami
Pro Evolution Soccer 2008	March 11, 2008	February 29, 2008	January 24, 2008	March 7, 2008	Konami	Konami
Pro Evolution Soccer 2009	November 11, 2008	November 7, 2008	January 29, 2009	November 20, 2008	Konami	Konami
Pro Evolution Soccer 2010	November 10, 2009	November 6, 2009	December 10, 2009	November 26, 2009	Konami	Konami
Pro Evolution Soccer 2011	November 2, 2010	October 29, 2010	November 18, 2010	November 8, 2010	Konami	Konami
Pro Evolution Soccer 2012	November 8, 2011	October 28, 2011	November 3, 2011	November 17, 2011	Konami	Konami
Pro Evolution Soccer 2013	November 6, 2012	October 26, 2012	November 1, 2012	Unreleased	Konami	Konami
Pro Evolution Soccer 2014	March 10, 2014	November 8, 2013	November 14, 2013	Unreleased	Konami	Konami
Pro Yakyuu Spirits 2010	April 1, 2010	Unreleased	Unreleased	Unreleased	Konami	Konami
Pro Yakyuu Spirits 2011	April 14, 2011	Unreleased	Unreleased	Unreleased	Konami	Konami
Pro Yakyuu Spirits 2012	March 29, 2012	Unreleased	Unreleased	Unreleased	Konami	Konami
Pro Yakyuu Spirits 2013	March 20, 2013	Unreleased	Unreleased	Unreleased	Konami	Konami
Pro Yakyuu Spirits 2014	March 20, 2014	Unreleased	Unreleased	Unreleased	Konami	Konami
Project Cerberus	Unreleased	Unreleased	August 26, 2010	Unreleased	Kaga Create	MileStone Inc.
ProStroke Golf: World Tour 2007	March 8, 2007	October 27, 2006	Unreleased	December 7, 2006	Gusto Games	Oxygen Games
Puella Magi Madoka Magica Portable	Unreleased	Unreleased	March 15, 2012	Unreleased	Namco Bandai Games	Namco Bandai Games
Pump It Up Zero Portable	Unreleased	Unreleased	October 15, 2007	Unreleased	Andamiro U.S.A. Corp.	Studio9
Pump It Up: EXCEED Portable	Unreleased	Unreleased	November 30, 2006	Unreleased	Andamiro U.S.A. Corp.	Studio9
Pursuit Force	March 7, 2006	November 18, 2005	March 2, 2006	Unreleased	Bigbig Studios	SCEE / Spike / SCEA
Pursuit Force: Extreme Justice	January 29, 2008	December 7, 2007	Unreleased	December 13, 2007	Bigbig Studios	SCEE / SCEA
Puyo Puyo 7	Unreleased	Unreleased	November 26, 2009	Unreleased	Sonic Team	Sega
Puyo Puyo Fever	Unreleased	May 19, 2006	December 24, 2004	Unreleased	Sonic Team	Sega
Puyo Puyo Fever 2	Unreleased	Unreleased	November 24, 2005	Unreleased	Sonic Team	Sega
Puyo Puyo! 15th Anniversary	Unreleased	Unreleased	March 21, 2007	Unreleased	Sonic Team	Sega
Puyo Puyo!! 20th Anniversary	Unreleased	Unreleased	December 15, 2011	Unreleased	Sonic Team	Sega
Puzzle Bobble Pocket	Unreleased	Unreleased	December 22, 2004	Unreleased	Taito	Taito
Puzzle Challenge: Crosswords and More	June 9, 2006	Unreleased	Unreleased	Unreleased	Crave Entertainment	Crave Entertainment
Puzzle Chronicles	January 28, 2010	February 26, 2010	Unreleased	Unreleased	Konami	Konami
Puzzle Guzzle	February 26, 2008	December 2, 2008	July 19, 2007	Unreleased	Agetec	Agetec
Puzzle Quest: Challenge of the Warlords	March 20, 2007	March 16, 2007	September 27, 2007	Unreleased	Infinite Interactive	D3 Publisher
Puzzle Scape	June 18, 2007	Unreleased	Unreleased	Unreleased	Farmind	Got Game Entertainment
Puzzler Collection	Unreleased	August 1, 2008	Unreleased	August 7, 2008	Destination Software	Ubisoft
PW: Project Witch	Unreleased	Unreleased	July 23, 2009	Unreleased	HuneX	GungHo
Qix++	Unreleased	Unreleased	February 25, 2010	Unreleased	Taito	Taito
Queen's Blade: Spiral Chaos	Unreleased	Unreleased	December 17, 2009	Unreleased	Namco Bandai Games	Namco Bandai Games
Queen's Gate: Spiral Chaos	Unreleased	Unreleased	July 28, 2011	Unreleased	Namco Bandai Games	Namco Bandai Games
Quiz Kidou Senshi Gundam: Toi Senshi DX	Unreleased	Unreleased	July 13, 2006	Unreleased	Bandai Namco Games	Bandai Namco Games
R-15 Portable	Unreleased	Unreleased	October 27, 2011	Unreleased	Kadokawa	Kadokawa
R-Type Command	May 6, 2008	September 26, 2008	September 20, 2007	Unreleased	Irem	Atlus
R-Type Tactics II: Operation Bitter Chocolate	Unreleased	Unreleased	December 10, 2009	Unreleased	Irem	Atlus
R.U.R.U.R.: Petit Prince	Unreleased	Unreleased	May 22, 2010	Unreleased	Views	Views
Race Driver 2006 (Note: Update for TOCA Race Driver 2: The Ultimate Racing Simulator. An expanded North American release of the earlier PSP game.)	June 6, 2006	Unreleased	Unreleased	Unreleased	Sumo Digital	Codemasters
Ragnarok Tactics	November 6, 2012	Unreleased	October 27, 2011	Unreleased	Apollo Soft	GungHo Online Entertainment
Rain Wonder Trip	Unreleased	Unreleased	July 6, 2006	Unreleased	iNiS	Bandai Namco Games
Rainbow Islands Evolution	January 24, 2008	March 23, 2007	February 8, 2007	March 29, 2007	Marvelous Entertainment	Marvelous / Majesco / Red Ant / Ignition
Rakuen Danshi	Unreleased	Unreleased	May 23, 2013	Unreleased	Takuyo	Takuyo
Ranshima Monogatari Rare Land Story: Shoujo no Yakujou	Unreleased	Unreleased	July 23, 2009	Unreleased	Arc System Works	Arc System Works
Rapala Pro Bass Fishing 2010	September 27, 2010	September 28, 2010	Unreleased	Unreleased	Fun Labs	Activision
Rapala Trophies	September 1, 2006	Unreleased	Unreleased	Unreleased	Sand Grain Studios	Activision
Ratatouille	June 26, 2007	September 28, 2007	Unreleased	August 29, 2007	Locomotive Games	THQ
Ratchet & Clank: Size Matters	February 13, 2007	May 11, 2007	June 28, 2007	May 24, 2007	High Impact Games	SCEA / SCEE / SCEI
Real Madrid: The Game	Unreleased	May 1, 2009	Unreleased	Unreleased	Atomic Planet Entertainment	V.2 Play
Real Rode Portable	Unreleased	Unreleased	April 22, 2010	Unreleased	HuneX	Kadokawa
Rebellions: Secret Game 2nd Stage	Unreleased	Unreleased	March 28, 2013	Unreleased	Yeti	Yeti
The Red Star	March 17, 2010	January 5, 2011	Unreleased	Unreleased	Archangel Studios	XS Games
Reel Fishing: The Great Outdoors	November 6, 2006	November 24, 2006	September 28, 2006	Unreleased	Natsume Inc.	Marvelous Entertainment / Natsume Inc.
Remember 11: The Age of Infinity	Unreleased	Unreleased	April 16, 2009	Unreleased	CyberFront	CyberFront
Renai 0 Kilometer Portable	Unreleased	Unreleased	January 31, 2013	Unreleased	Alchemist	Alchemist
Renai Banchou: Inochi Meishi, Koiseyo Otome! Love is Power!!!	Unreleased	Unreleased	November 11, 2010	Unreleased	Idea Factory	Idea Factory
Renai Banchou 2: Midnight Lesson!!	Unreleased	Unreleased	January 26, 2012	Unreleased	Idea Factory	Idea Factory
Rengoku: The Tower of Purgatory	April 26, 2005	February 10, 2006	January 27, 2005	Unreleased	Neverland	Konami / Hudson Soft
Rengoku II: The Stairway to Heaven	September 12, 2006	October 20, 2006	April 27, 2006	December 8, 2006	Neverland	Konami / Hudson Soft
Retro City Rampage DX	July 19, 2016	July 27, 2016	Unreleased	July 27, 2016	Vblank Entertainment	Vblank Entertainment
Resistance: Retribution	March 17, 2009	March 20, 2009	March 12, 2009	March 26, 2009	Bend Studio	SCEI / SCEA / SCEE
Rewrite	Unreleased	Unreleased	April 17, 2014	Unreleased	Key	Prototype
Rezel Cross	Unreleased	Unreleased	September 6, 2007	Unreleased	SIMS	SCEJ
Ridge Racer	March 24, 2005	September 1, 2005	December 12, 2004	Unreleased	Namco	Namco / SCEE
Ridge Racer 2	Unreleased	October 13, 2006	September 14, 2006	October 19, 2006	Namco	Namco / SCEE
Riviera: The Promised Land	July 11, 2007	April 4, 2008	November 22, 2006	May 8, 2008	Sting Entertainment	Atlus; Sting Entertainment; 505 Games
Ro-Kyu-Bu!	Unreleased	Unreleased	October 27, 2011	Unreleased	Kadokawa	Kadokawa
Ro-Kyu-Bu! Himitsu no Otoshimono	Unreleased	Unreleased	June 20, 2013	Unreleased	Kadokawa	Kadokawa
Rock Band Unplugged	June 9, 2009	June 19, 2009	Unreleased	Unreleased	Backbone Entertainment	Electronic Arts
Rocky Balboa	March 13, 2007	January 26, 2007	Unreleased	January 25, 2007	Ubisoft	Ubisoft
RockMan DASH: Hagane no Boukenshin	Unreleased	Unreleased	August 4, 2005	Unreleased	Capcom	Capcom
RockMan DASH 2: Episode 2 Ooinaru Isan	Unreleased	Unreleased	September 8, 2005	Unreleased	Capcom	Capcom
Romeo & Juliet	Unreleased	Unreleased	March 27, 2014	Unreleased	QuinRose	QuinRose
Romeo VS Juliet	Unreleased	Unreleased	August 22, 2013	Unreleased	QuinRose	QuinRose
Routes Portable	Unreleased	Unreleased	January 25, 2007	Unreleased	Aqua Plus	Aqua Plus
Rugby League Challenge	Unreleased	Unreleased	Unreleased	September 10, 2009	Wicked Witch Software	SCEE
Rurouni Kenshin: Meiji Kenkaku Romantan Kansei	Unreleased	Unreleased	August 30, 2012	Unreleased	Natsume Atari	Bandai Namco Games
Rurouni Kenshin: Meiji Kenkaku Romantan Saisen	Unreleased	Unreleased	March 10, 2011	Unreleased	Natsume Atari	Bandai Namco Games
Rush	October 30, 2006	November 17, 2006	Unreleased	Unreleased	Midway Studios - Newcastle	Midway Games
Ryu-koku	Unreleased	Unreleased	October 13, 2011	Unreleased	KID	CyberFront
S.Y.K Renshouden Portable	Unreleased	Unreleased	April 21, 2011	Unreleased	Otomate	Idea Factory
S.Y.K Shinsetsu Saiyuuki Portable	Unreleased	Unreleased	July 29, 2010	Unreleased	Otomate	Idea Factory
Saigo no Yakusoku no Monogatari	Unreleased	Unreleased	April 28, 2011	Unreleased	Imageepoch	Imageepoch
Saihate no Ima Portable	Unreleased	Unreleased	July 26, 2012	Unreleased	Xuse	CyberFront
Saikyou Shogi Bonanza	Unreleased	Unreleased	December 18, 2008	Unreleased	Success	Success
Saikyou Toudai Shogi Deluxe	Unreleased	Unreleased	August 20, 2009	Unreleased	NCS	NCS
Saikyou Toudai Shogi Portable	Unreleased	Unreleased	December 22, 2005	Unreleased	Mycom	Mycom
Saint Seiya Omega: Ultimate Cosmos	Unreleased	Unreleased	November 29, 2012	Unreleased	Namco Bandai Games	Namco Bandai Games
Saikyou Toudai Shogi Portable	Unreleased	Unreleased	July 28, 2011	Unreleased	Giga	Alchemist
Saki Portable	Unreleased	Unreleased	March 25, 2010	Unreleased	Alchemist	Alchemist
Saki: Achiga-Hen Episode of Side-A Portable	Unreleased	Unreleased	August 29, 2013	Unreleased	Alchemist	Alchemist
Sakura Sakura: Haru Urara	Unreleased	Unreleased	August 26, 2010	Unreleased	GN Software	GN Software
Sakura Taisen 1 & 2	Unreleased	Unreleased	March 9, 2006	Unreleased	Sega	Sega
Sakura-Sou no Pet na Kanojo	Unreleased	Unreleased	February 14, 2013	Unreleased	Kadokawa	Kadokawa
Salamander Portable	Unreleased	Unreleased	January 25, 2007	Unreleased	M2	Konami
Sampaguita	Unreleased	Unreleased	July 28, 2005	Unreleased	SCEI	SCEI
Samurai Dou Portable	Unreleased	Unreleased	September 18, 2008	Unreleased	Spike	Spike
Samurai Dou 2 Portable	Unreleased	Unreleased	September 3, 2009	Unreleased	Spike	Spike
Samurai Shodown Anthology	March 24, 2009	March 27, 2009	Unreleased	Unreleased	SNK Playmore	SNK Playmore
Samurai Warriors: State of War	March 7, 2006	March 24, 2006	December 8, 2005	March 30, 2006	Omega Force	Koei
San Goku Shi IX with Power-Up Kit	Unreleased	Unreleased	March 10, 2011	Unreleased	Koei Tecmo	Koei Tecmo
San Goku Shi V	Unreleased	Unreleased	April 1, 2005	Unreleased	Koei	Koei
San Goku Shi VI	Unreleased	Unreleased	October 6, 2005	Unreleased	Koei	Koei
San Goku Shi VII	Unreleased	Unreleased	March 21, 2007	Unreleased	Koei	Koei
San Goku Shi VIII	Unreleased	Unreleased	March 21, 2007	Unreleased	Koei	Koei
Sangoku Hime 2: Tenka Hatou - Shishi no Keishousha	Unreleased	Unreleased	April 11, 2013	Unreleased	SystemSoft Alpha	SystemSoft Alpha
Sangoku Hime: Sangoku Ransei - Haruten no Saihai	Unreleased	Unreleased	December 22, 2011	Unreleased	SystemSoft Alpha	SystemSoft Alpha
Sangoku Rensenki: Otome no Heihou!	Unreleased	Unreleased	July 26, 2012	Unreleased	Prototype	Prototype
Sangoku Rensenki: Otome no Heihou! Omoide Gaeshi-CS Edition	Unreleased	Unreleased	February 4, 2016	Unreleased	Prototype	Prototype
Saru Get You: Pipo Saru Racer	Unreleased	Unreleased	December 7, 2006	Unreleased	SCEI	SCEI
Saru Get You: SaruSaru Daisakusen	Unreleased	Unreleased	July 26, 2007	Unreleased	h.a.n.d. Inc.	SCEI
Satomi Hakkenden: Hachitama no Ki	Unreleased	Unreleased	February 27, 2014	Unreleased	QuinRose	QuinRose
Satomi Hakkenden: Hamaji Himenoki	Unreleased	Unreleased	September 25, 2014	Unreleased	QuinRose	QuinRose
Satomi Hakkenden: Murasamemaru no Ki	Unreleased	Unreleased	January 22, 2015	Unreleased	QuinRose	QuinRose
Savage Moon: The Hera Campaign	Unreleased	Unreleased	December 22, 2009	Unreleased	FluffyLogic	SCEA
Scared Rider Xechs I+FD Portable	Unreleased	Unreleased	April 26, 2012	Unreleased	RED Entertainment	RED Entertainment
SBK-08: Superbike World Championship	March 17, 2009	August 1, 2008	Unreleased	June 26, 2008	Milestone srl	Black Bean Games / Conspiracy
SBK-09: Superbike World Championship	Unreleased	May 29, 2009	Unreleased	June 25, 2009	Milestone srl	Black Bean Games / Conspiracy
Scarface: Money. Power. Respect.	October 8, 2006	November 17, 2006	Unreleased	November 2006	FarSight Studios	Vivendi Games
School Rumble: Anesan Jiken Desu!	Unreleased	Unreleased	July 7, 2005	Unreleased	Kid	Bandai
School Wars	Unreleased	Unreleased	November 29, 2012	Unreleased	QuinRose	QuinRose
School Wars: Sotsugyou Sensen	Unreleased	Unreleased	June 27, 2013	Unreleased	QuinRose	QuinRose
Scooby-Doo! Who's Watching Who?	October 16, 2006	November 17, 2006	Unreleased	November 23, 2006	Savage Entertainment	THQ
Scrabble	March 17, 2009	Unreleased	Unreleased	Unreleased	Electronic Arts	Electronic Arts
SD Gundam G Generation Overworld	Unreleased	Unreleased	September 27, 2012	Unreleased	Bandai Namco Games	Bandai Namco Games
SD Gundam G Generation Portable	Unreleased	Unreleased	August 3, 2006	Unreleased	Tom Create	Bandai Namco Games
SD Gundam G Generation World	Unreleased	Unreleased	February 24, 2011	Unreleased	Bandai Namco Games	Bandai Namco Games
Second Novel: Kanojo no Natsu, 15-Bun no Kioku	Unreleased	Unreleased	July 29, 2010	Unreleased	Nippon Ichi Software	Nippon Ichi Software
Secret Agent Clank	June 17, 2008	July 11, 2008	November 20, 2008	July 17, 2008	High Impact Games	SCEA
Secret Game: Killer Queen Portable	Unreleased	Unreleased	May 27, 2010	Unreleased	Yeti	Yeti
Secret of Evangelion Portable	Unreleased	Unreleased	June 28, 2007	Unreleased	CyberFront	CyberFront
The Secret Saturdays: Beasts of the 5th Sun	October 20, 2009	November 20, 2009	Unreleased	Unreleased	High Voltage Software	D3 Publisher
Sega Genesis Collection	November 16, 2006	February 2, 2007	Unreleased	February 8, 2007	Backbone Entertainment	Sega
Sega Rally Revo	October 9, 2007	September 28, 2007	January 31, 2008	September 27, 2007	Bugbear Entertainment	Sega
Seinaru Kana: Orichalcum no Na no Motoni	Unreleased	Unreleased	April 19, 2012	Unreleased	Xuse	CyberFront
Seishun Hajimemashita!	Unreleased	Unreleased	October 31, 2013	Unreleased	honeybee+	honeybee+
Seitokai no Ichizon Lv. 2 Portable	Unreleased	Unreleased	December 29, 2013	Unreleased	Kadokawa	Kadokawa
Sekai De Ichiban NG na Koi: Full House	Unreleased	Unreleased	July 28, 2011	Unreleased	Boost On	Boost On
Sekai wa Atashi de Mawatteru: Hikari to Yami no Princess	Unreleased	Unreleased	July 9, 2009	Unreleased	Global A	Global A
Sengoku Basara: Battle Heroes	Unreleased	Unreleased	April 9, 2009	Unreleased	Access Games	Capcom
Sengoku Basara: Chronicle Heroes	Unreleased	Unreleased	July 21, 2011	Unreleased	Access Games	Capcom
Sengoku Cannon: Sengoku Ace Episode III	Unreleased	Unreleased	July 25, 2005	Unreleased	Psikyo	X-Nauts
Sengoku Efuda Yuugi: Hototogisu Ran	Unreleased	Unreleased	November 13, 2008	Unreleased	Irem	Irem
Sengoku Efuda Yuugi: Hototogisu Tairan	Unreleased	Unreleased	September 9, 2010	Unreleased	Irem	Irem
Sengoku Hime 2 Arashi: Hyakubana, Senran Tatsukaze no Gotoku	Unreleased	Unreleased	December 2, 2010	Unreleased	Unicorn-A	SystemSoft Alpha
Sengoku Hime 3: Tenka o Kirisaku Hikari to Kage	Unreleased	Unreleased	March 29, 2012	Unreleased	Unicorn-A	SystemSoft Alpha
Sengoku Hime 4: Souha Hyakkei, Hana Mamoru Chikai	Unreleased	Unreleased	January 23, 2014	Unreleased	Unicorn-A	SystemSoft Alpha
Sengoku Hime: Senran ni Mau Otometachi	Unreleased	Unreleased	November 12, 2009	Unreleased	Yeti	Yeti
Sengoku Musou 3 Z Special	Unreleased	Unreleased	February 16, 2012	Unreleased	Omega Force	Tecmo Koei
Sengoku Tenka Touitsu	Unreleased	Unreleased	March 26, 2009	Unreleased	SystemSoft	SystemSoft
Senritsu no Stratus	Unreleased	Unreleased	October 20, 2011	Unreleased	NUDE MAKER, Y.K.	Konami
The Sensha	Unreleased	Unreleased	March 30, 2006	Unreleased	D3 Publisher	D3 Publisher
Shanghai	Unreleased	Unreleased	March 23, 2006	Unreleased	SunSoft	SunSoft
Sharin no Kuni, Himawari no Shoujo	Unreleased	Unreleased	February 23, 2012	Unreleased	Akabee Soft 2	5pb
Shaun White Snowboarding	November 16, 2008	November 14, 2008	February 5, 2009	November 13, 2008	Ubisoft Montreal	Ubisoft
Shadow of Destiny	January 26, 2010	Unreleased	October 1, 2009	Unreleased	Konami	Konami
Shepherd's Crossing	May 11, 2010	Unreleased	May 28, 2009	Unreleased	Success	Graffiti Entertainment
Shichida Shiki Training: Unou Tanren Portable	Unreleased	Unreleased	August 24, 2006	Unreleased	Interchannel	Interchannel
Shiei no Sona-Nyl Refrain: What a Beautiful Memories	Unreleased	Unreleased	February 27, 2014	Unreleased	Liar Soft	Liar Soft
Shin Hisui no Shizuku: Hiiro no Kakera 2 Portable	Unreleased	Unreleased	August 19, 2010	Unreleased	Otomate	Idea Factory
Shin Ken to Mahou to Gakuen Mono.: Toki no Gakuen	Unreleased	Unreleased	July 19, 2012	Unreleased	Zerodiv	Acquire
Shin Koihime Musou: Otome Ryouran * Sangokushi Engi - Shu-Hen	Unreleased	Unreleased	November 25, 2010	Unreleased	Rain Entertainment	Yeti
Shin Koihime Musou: Otome Ryouran * Sangokushi Engi - Wei-Hen	Unreleased	Unreleased	October 28, 2010	Unreleased	Rain Entertainment	Yeti
Shin Koihime Musou: Otome Ryouran * Sangokushi Engi - Wu-Hen	Unreleased	Unreleased	September 22, 2010	Unreleased	Rain Entertainment	Yeti
Shin Master of Monsters Final EX	Unreleased	Unreleased	August 19, 2010	Unreleased	SystemSoft	SystemSoft
Shin Megami Tensei: Devil Summoner	Unreleased	Unreleased	December 22, 2005	Unreleased	INT; Atlus	Atlus
Shin Megami Tensei: Persona	September 22, 2009	August 11, 2010	April 29, 2009	August 11, 2010	Atlus	Atlus
Shin Megami Tensei: Persona 2 Batsu	Unreleased	Unreleased	May 17, 2012	Unreleased	Atlus	Atlus
Shin Megami Tensei: Persona 2 Innocent sin	September 20, 2011	November 4, 2011	April 14, 2011	Unreleased	Atlus	Atlus
Shin Megami Tensei: Persona 3	July 6, 2010	April 28, 2011	November 1, 2009	Unreleased	Atlus	Atlus
Shin Sangoku Musou 5 Empires (Note: Stand-alone expansion for Shin Sangoku Musou 5 (Dynasty Warriors 6).)	Unreleased	Unreleased	January 21, 2010	Unreleased	Koei	Koei
Shin Sangoku Musou 5 Special	Unreleased	Unreleased	October 22, 2009	Unreleased	Omega Force	Koei
Shin Sangoku Musou 6 Special	Unreleased	Unreleased	August 25, 2011	Unreleased	Omega Force	Koei
Shin Sangoku Musou: Multi Raid 2	Unreleased	Unreleased	March 11, 2010	Unreleased	Koei	Koei
Shinigami Kagyou: Kaidan Romance	Unreleased	Unreleased	March 28, 2013	Unreleased	QuinRose	QuinRose
Shinigami Shogyou: Kaidan Romance	Unreleased	Unreleased	November 14, 2013	Unreleased	QuinRose	QuinRose
Shinigami to Shoujo	Unreleased	Unreleased	July 28, 2011	Unreleased	Takuyo	Takuyo
Shining Ark	Unreleased	Unreleased	February 28, 2013	Unreleased	Media Vision	Sega
Shining Blade	Unreleased	Unreleased	March 15, 2012	Unreleased	Sega	Sega
Shining Hearts	Unreleased	Unreleased	December 16, 2010	Unreleased	Sega	Sega
Shinkyouku Soukai Polyphonica: 0-4 Wa Full Pack	Unreleased	Unreleased	June 26, 2008	Unreleased	Visual Arts	Prototype
Shinkyouku Soukai Polyphonica: After School	Unreleased	Unreleased	February 17, 2011	Unreleased	Visual Arts	Prototype
Shinobi, Koi Utsutsu	Unreleased	Unreleased	January 30, 2014	Unreleased	Otomate	Idea Factory
Shinobido: Tales of the Ninja	Unreleased	February 9, 2007	October 26, 2006	Unreleased	Acquire	Spike
Shinseiki Evangelion 2: Tsukurareshi Sekai - Another Cases	Unreleased	Unreleased	April 27, 2006	Unreleased	Alfa System	Bandai Namco Games
Shinseiki Evangelion: Battle Orchestra Portable	Unreleased	Unreleased	July 30, 2009	Unreleased	Headlock	Broccoli
Shinseiki Evangelion: Koutetsu no Girlfriend 2nd Portable	Unreleased	Unreleased	June 11, 2009	Unreleased	Headlock	Broccoli
Shinseiki Evangelion: Koutetsu no Girlfriend Tokubetsu-Hen Portable	Unreleased	Unreleased	April 9, 2009	Unreleased	CyberFront	CyberFront
Shinseiki GPX Cyber Formula VS	Unreleased	Unreleased	July 10, 2008	Unreleased	Sunrise Interactive	Sunrise Interactive
Shinsouban Clover no Kuni no Alice: Wonderful Wonder World (Note: Update for Clover no Kuni no Alice.)	Unreleased	Unreleased	December 18, 2014	Unreleased	QuinRose	QuinRose
Shinsouban Heart no Kuni no Alice: Wonderful Wonder World (Note: Update for Heart no Kuni no Alice: Wonderful Wonder World.)	Unreleased	Unreleased	October 31, 2013	Unreleased	QuinRose	QuinRose
Shirahana no Ori: Hiiro no Kakera 4	Unreleased	Unreleased	September 20, 2012	Unreleased	Otomate	Idea Factory
Shirahana no Ori: Hiiro no Kakera 4 - Shiki no Uta	Unreleased	Unreleased	September 5, 2013	Unreleased	Otomate	Idea Factory
Shiratsuyu no Kai	Unreleased	Unreleased	August 1, 2013	Unreleased	Otomate	Idea Factory
Shirogane no Cal to Soukuu no Joou	Unreleased	Unreleased	October 13, 2011	Unreleased	Kogado Studio	CyberFront
Shirokuma Belles Stars: Happy Holidays!	Unreleased	Unreleased	July 26, 2012	Unreleased	Boost On	Boost On
The Shogi	Unreleased	Unreleased	August 5, 2010	Unreleased	Yuki	D3 Publisher
Shogi ga Tsuyokunaru: Gekishi - Jouseki Dojo	Unreleased	Unreleased	August 9, 2007	Unreleased	NCS	NCS
Shogi World Champion: Gekisashi Portable	Unreleased	Unreleased	April 15, 2010	Unreleased	Mainichi Communications	Mainichi Communications
Shrek Smash n' Crash Racing	December 12, 2006	February 16, 2007	Unreleased	March 14, 2007	Torus Games	Activision
Shrek the Third	June 5, 2007	July 20, 2007	Unreleased	July 24, 2007	Amaze Entertainment	Activision
Shukufuku no Campanella Portable	Unreleased	Unreleased	September 30, 2010	Unreleased	Windmill Oasis	Kadokawa
Shutsugeki!! Otometachi no Senjou 2: Ikusabana no Kizuna	Unreleased	Unreleased	June 30, 2011	Unreleased	SystemSoft	SystemSoft
Shuukan Toro Station	Unreleased	Unreleased	November 11, 2009	Unreleased	SCEI	SCEI
Sid Meier's Pirates!	January 22, 2007	March 9, 2007	Unreleased	March 16, 2007	Full Fat	2K Games
Silent Hill: Origins	November 6, 2007	November 16, 2007	December 6, 2007	November 30, 2007	Climax Studios	Konami
Silent Hill: Shattered Memories	January 19, 2010	February 26, 2010	March 25, 2010	April 26, 2010	Climax Studios	Konami
Silverfall	Unreleased	August 3, 2007	Unreleased	Unreleased	Monte Cristo	Monte Cristo
The Simpsons Game	November 5, 2007	November 9, 2007	Unreleased	November 15, 2007	Rebellion Developments	Electronic Arts
The Sims 2	December 7, 2005	January 13, 2006	February 9, 2006	Unreleased	Maxis	Electronic Arts
The Sims 2: Castaway	October 22, 2007	November 2, 2007	Unreleased	November 1, 2007	Maxis	Electronic Arts
The Sims 2: Pets	December 14, 2006	December 15, 2006	January 18, 2007	December 14, 2006	Maxis	Electronic Arts
Skate Park City	Unreleased	July 4, 2008	Unreleased	Unreleased	Midas Interactive Entertainment	Midas Interactive Entertainment
Slotter Mania P: Mach Go Go Go III	Unreleased	Unreleased	January 6, 2011	Unreleased	Dorart	Dorart
Slotter Mania P: SanSan HanaHana & SanSan Oasis	Unreleased	Unreleased	October 21, 2010	Unreleased	Dorart	Dorart
Slotter Mania P: Tetsuya Shinjuku vs Ueno	Unreleased	Unreleased	February 18, 2010	Unreleased	Dorart	Dorart
Smart Bomb	May 10, 2005	Unreleased	June 16, 2005	Unreleased	Core Design	Eidos Interactive
Smash Court Tennis 3	July 16, 2007	June 1, 2007	June 21, 2007	May 31, 2007	Namco	Namco Bandai Games
SNK Arcade Classics 0	Unreleased	Unreleased	April 21, 2011	Unreleased	SNK Playmore	SNK Playmore
SNK Arcade Classics Vol. 1	May 5, 2008	October 17, 2008	May 21, 2009	Unreleased	SNK Playmore	SNK Playmore
Snoopy vs. the Red Baron	October 24, 2006	Unreleased	Unreleased	Unreleased	Smart Bomb Interactive	Namco Bandai Games
Snow Bound Land	Unreleased	Unreleased	November 21, 2013	Unreleased	Design Factory	Idea Factory
Snow Portable	Unreleased	Unreleased	August 16, 2007	Unreleased	HuneX	Prototype
So-Ra-No-Wo-To: Otome no Gojuusou	Unreleased	Unreleased	May 27, 2007	Unreleased	Compile Heart	Compile Heart
SOCOM U.S. Navy SEALs: Fireteam Bravo	November 8, 2005	April 21, 2006	Unreleased	April 26, 2006	Zipper Interactive	SCEA / SCEE
SOCOM U.S. Navy SEALs: Fireteam Bravo 2	November 7, 2006	June 15, 2007	Unreleased	June 27, 2007	Zipper Interactive	SCEA / SCEE
SOCOM U.S. Navy SEALs: Fireteam Bravo 3	February 16, 2010	February 19, 2010	February 11, 2010	February 25, 2010	Slant Six Games	SCEA / SCEE
SOCOM U.S. Navy SEALs: Tactical Strike	November 23, 2007	December 7, 2007	Unreleased	February 28, 2008	Slant Six Games	SCEA / SCEE
Solomon's Ring: Kaze no Shou	Unreleased	Unreleased	December 20, 2012	Unreleased	PlanPeace	PlanPeace
Sol Trigger	Unreleased	Unreleased	October 4, 2012	Unreleased	Imageepoch	Imageepoch
Soldier Collection	Unreleased	Unreleased	September 25, 2008	Unreleased	Hudson Soft	Hudson Soft
Solfege: Sweet Harmony	Unreleased	Unreleased	December 18, 2008	Unreleased	HuneX	GungHo
Solomon's Ring: Chi no Shou	Unreleased	Unreleased	June 27, 2013	Unreleased	PlanPeace	PlanPeace
Solomon's Ring: Hi no Shou	Unreleased	Unreleased	December 20, 2012	Unreleased	PlanPeace	PlanPeace
Solomon's Ring: Mizu no Shou	Unreleased	Unreleased	April 25, 2013	Unreleased	PlanPeace	PlanPeace
Sonic Rivals	November 16, 2006	December 1, 2006	Unreleased	December 7, 2006	Backbone Entertainment / Sega Studios USA	Sega
Sonic Rivals 2	November 13, 2007	December 7, 2007	Unreleased	December 6, 2007	Backbone Entertainment / Sega Studios USA	Sega
Sora no Otoshimono: DokiDoki Summer Vacation	Unreleased	Unreleased	March 25, 2010	Unreleased	Kadokawa	Kadokawa
Sora o Aogite Kumo Takaku Portable	Unreleased	Unreleased	March 7, 2013	Unreleased	CyberFront	CyberFront
Sorairo Portable	Unreleased	Unreleased	September 6, 2012	Unreleased	CyberFront	CyberFront
Sorayume Portable	Unreleased	Unreleased	May 28, 2009	Unreleased	Takuyo	Takuyo
Soreyuke! BurunyanMan Portable	Unreleased	Unreleased	August 2, 2012	Unreleased	Alchemist	Alchemist
Soukoku no Kusabi: Hiiro no Kakera 3 - Asu e no Tobira	Unreleased	Unreleased	May 31, 2012	Unreleased	Design Factory	Idea Factory
Soukoku no Kusabi: Hiiro no Kakera 3 Portable	Unreleased	Unreleased	April 15, 2010	Unreleased	Idea Factory	Idea Factory
Soukyuu no Fafner: Dead Aggressor	Unreleased	Unreleased	January 27, 2005	Unreleased	Artdink	Bandai
Soulcalibur: Broken Destiny	September 1, 2009	September 4, 2009	August 27, 2009	September 3, 2009	Namco Bandai Games	Namco Bandai Games
Soul Eater: Battle Resonance	Unreleased	Unreleased	January 29, 2009	Unreleased	Namco Bandai Games	Namco Bandai Games
Space Invaders Evolution	Unreleased	November 3, 2006	September 22, 2005	Unreleased	Marvelous Entertainment	Marvelous / Atari / Rising Star
Space Invaders Extreme	June 17, 2008	July 4, 2008	July 30, 2009	Unreleased	Taito	Square Enix
Space Invaders Pocket	Unreleased	Unreleased	May 12, 2005	Unreleased	Taito	Taito
Spectral Souls: Resurrection of the Ethereal Empires	September 26, 2006	Unreleased	October 27, 2005	Unreleased	Idea Factory	Nippon Ichi Software
Spectral vs. Generation	Unreleased	March 30, 2007	October 26, 2006	Unreleased	Idea Factory	Idea Factory / Midas
Spelling Challenges and More!	September 25, 2007	Unreleased	Unreleased	Unreleased	Supersonic Software	Crave Entertainment
Spider-Man 2	March 24, 2005	September 1, 2005	October 26, 2006	Unreleased	Vicarious Visions	Activision
Spider-Man 3	October 16, 2007	November 2, 2007	Unreleased	December 4, 2007	Vicarious Visions	Activision
Spider-Man: Friend or Foe	October 2, 2007	November 2, 2007	Unreleased	October 31, 2007	Artificial Mind and Movement	Activision
Spider-Man: Web of Shadows	October 21, 2008	October 24, 2008	Unreleased	Unreleased	Shaba Games	Activision
Spinout	Unreleased	March 20, 2008	Unreleased	Unreleased	Icon Games	Ghostlight
Split/Second	November 16, 2010	November 19, 2010	April 28, 2011	2011	Black Rock Studio	Disney Interactive Studios
SpongeBob SquarePants: The Yellow Avenger	March 6, 2006	April 13, 2006	Unreleased	Unreleased	Tantalus Media	THQ
SpongeBob's Truth or Square	October 26, 2009	November 13, 2009	Unreleased	Unreleased	Barking Lizards Technologies	THQ
SSX on Tour	October 11, 2005	October 28, 2005	November 24, 2005	Unreleased	EA Canada	EA Sports BIG
Stacked with Daniel Negreanu	October 6, 2006	Unreleased	Unreleased	February 16, 2007	5000 ft	Myelin Media
Star Driver: Kagayaki no Takuto - Ginga Bishounen Densetsu	Unreleased	Unreleased	March 3, 2011	Unreleased	Crafts & Meister	Bandai Namco Games
Star Ocean: First Departure	October 21, 2008	October 24, 2008	December 27, 2007	October 24, 2008	Tose	Square Enix
Star Ocean: Second Evolution	January 19, 2009	February 13, 2009	April 2, 2008	February 12, 2009	Tose	Square Enix
Star Soldier	Unreleased	Unreleased	July 21, 2005	Unreleased	Hudson Soft	Hudson Soft
Star Trek: Tactical Assault	November 14, 2006	December 1, 2006	Unreleased	December 7, 2006	Quicksilver Software	Bethesda Softworks
Star Wars: Battlefront II	October 31, 2005	November 1, 2005	April 6, 2006	Unreleased	Pandemic Studios	LucasArts
Star Wars Battlefront: Elite Squadron	November 3, 2009	November 6, 2009	Unreleased	November 12, 2009	Rebellion Developments (PSP), N-Space (DS)	LucasArts
Star Wars Battlefront: Renegade Squadron	October 9, 2007	October 12, 2007	Unreleased	October 10, 2007	Rebellion Developments	LucasArts
Star Wars: Lethal Alliance	December 7, 2006	December 8, 2006	Unreleased	December 7, 2006	Ubisoft Montreal	Ubisoft
Star Wars: The Clone Wars - Republic Heroes	October 6, 2009	October 9, 2009	Unreleased	October 6, 2009	LucasArts	LucasArts
Star Wars: The Force Unleashed	September 16, 2008	September 19, 2008	Unreleased	September 17, 2008	Krome Studios	LucasArts
Starry * Sky: After Autumn Portable	Unreleased	Unreleased	June 27, 2013	Unreleased	honeybee+	honeybee+
Starry * Sky: After Spring Portable	Unreleased	Unreleased	December 27, 2012	Unreleased	honeybee+	honeybee+
Starry * Sky: After Summer Portable	Unreleased	Unreleased	March 28, 2013	Unreleased	honeybee+	honeybee+
Starry * Sky: After Winter Portable	Unreleased	Unreleased	September 26, 2013	Unreleased	honeybee+	honeybee+
Starry * Sky: In Autumn - Portable	Unreleased	Unreleased	December 22, 2010	Unreleased	honeybee+	Asgard
Starry * Sky: In Spring - Portable	Unreleased	Unreleased	June 24, 2010	Unreleased	honeybee+	Asgard
Starry * Sky: In Summer - Portable	Unreleased	Unreleased	September 30, 2010	Unreleased	honeybee+	Asgard
Starry * Sky: In Winter - Portable	Unreleased	Unreleased	April 28, 2011	Unreleased	honeybee+	Asgard
StateShift	Unreleased	June 8, 2007	Unreleased	Unreleased	Midas Interactive Entertainment	Midas Interactive Entertainment
Stellar * Theater Portable	Unreleased	Unreleased	February 28, 2013	Unreleased	CyberFront	CyberFront
Steambot Chronicles: Battle Tournament	June 30, 2009	Unreleased	July 10, 2008	Unreleased	Irem	Atlus
Steel Horizon	July 2, 2007	September 28, 2007	Unreleased	Unreleased	Konami	Konami
Steins;Gate	Unreleased	Unreleased	June 23, 2011	Unreleased	5pb. / Nitroplus	Kadokawa Shoten
Steins;Gate: Hiyoku Renri no Darling	Unreleased	Unreleased	April 26, 2012	Unreleased	5pb. / Nitroplus	5pb.
Storm Lover	Unreleased	Unreleased	August 5, 2010	Unreleased	Vridge	D3 Publisher
Storm Lover Kai!! (Note: Update for Storm Lover.)	Unreleased	Unreleased	June 7, 2012	Unreleased	Vridge	D3 Publisher
Storm Lover Natsukoi!!	Unreleased	Unreleased	August 4, 2011	Unreleased	Vridge	D3 Publisher
StormLover 2nd	Unreleased	Unreleased	June 20, 2013	Unreleased	Vridge	D3 Publisher
Street Cricket Champions	Unreleased	November 10, 2010	Unreleased	Unreleased	Trine Games	SCEA
Street Cricket Champions 2	Unreleased	September 29, 2012	Unreleased	Unreleased	Trine Games	SCEA
Street Fighter Alpha 3 Max	February 7, 2006	March 10, 2006	January 19, 2006	2006	Capcom	Capcom
Street Riders	Unreleased	March 11, 2006	Unreleased	March 31, 2006	Ubisoft	Ubisoft
Street Supremacy	February 28, 2006	September 29, 2006	April 21, 2005	Unreleased	Genki	Genki / Konami
StreetKix: Freestyle	January 7, 2014	Unreleased	Unreleased	Unreleased	Ilusis Interactive Graphics	Hoplite Research
Strike Witches: Hakugin no Tsubasa	Unreleased	Unreleased	June 28, 2012	Unreleased	CyberFront	CyberFront
Strikers 1945 Plus	July 30, 2009	July 30, 2009	August 6, 2009	Unreleased	Arc System Works	PM Studios Inc.
Sucre Portable	Unreleased	Unreleased	September 13, 2012	Unreleased	Giga	CyberFront
Sudoku	Unreleased	Unreleased	November 16, 2006	Unreleased	Hudson Soft	Hudson Soft
SuGirly Wish Limited	Unreleased	Unreleased	December 13, 2012	Unreleased	HookSoft	GN Software
Suigetsu Ni Portable	Unreleased	Unreleased	May 24, 2012	Unreleased	GN Software	GN Software
Suigetsu Portable	Unreleased	Unreleased	October 30, 2008	Unreleased	F&C	GN Software
Suiheisenma de Nani Mile? Original Flight	Unreleased	Unreleased	December 20, 2012	Unreleased	Alchemist	Alchemist
Summon Night 3	Unreleased	Unreleased	October 4, 2012	Unreleased	Namco Bandai Games	Namco Bandai Games
Summon Night 4	Unreleased	Unreleased	November 15, 2012	Unreleased	Namco Bandai Games	Namco Bandai Games
Summon Night 5	December 15, 2015	Unreleased	May 16, 2013	Unreleased	Namco Bandai Games	Namco Bandai Games
Sunday VS Magazine Shuuketsu! Choujou Daikessen	Unreleased	Unreleased	March 26, 2009	Unreleased	Konami	Konami
Super Collapse 3	September 18, 2007	Unreleased	Unreleased	Unreleased	GameHouse	MumboJumbo
Super Dangan Ronpa 2: Sayonara Zetsubou Gakuen	Unreleased	Unreleased	July 26, 2012	Unreleased	Spike Chunsoft	Spike Chunsoft
Super Fruit Fall •Super Fruit Fall Deluxe Edition (Note: Also released under the title Super Fruit Fall Deluxe Edition.)	Unreleased	August 10, 2007	Unreleased	Unreleased	Studio 3	Studio 3
Super Hind	Unreleased	September 9, 2008	Unreleased	Unreleased	Mountain Sheep	V.2 Play
Super Monkey Ball Adventure	August 29, 2006	June 30, 2006	Unreleased	Unreleased	Traveller's Tales	Sega
Super Pocket Tennis	December 3, 2009	June 8, 2007	February 23, 2006	January 22, 2009	HuneX	D3 Publisher
Super Robot Taisen A Portable	Unreleased	Unreleased	June 19, 2008	Unreleased	Banpresto	Namco Bandai Games
Super Robot Taisen MX Portable	Unreleased	Unreleased	December 29, 2005	Unreleased	Banpresto	Banpresto
Super Robot Taisen OE: Operation Extend	Unreleased	Unreleased	July 18, 2013	Unreleased	sazanami	Namco Bandai Games
Super Robot Taisen OG Saga: Masou Kishin - The Lord of Elemental	Unreleased	Unreleased	July 25, 2013	Unreleased	Namco Bandai Games	Namco Bandai Games
Super Robot Taisen OG Saga: Masou Kishin II: Revelation of Evil God	Unreleased	Unreleased	January 12, 2012	Unreleased	Namco Bandai Games	Namco Bandai Games
Super Stardust Portable; Star Strike Portable	December 4, 2008	November 25, 2008	December 18, 2008	November 25, 2008	SCEA	SCEI / SCEA / SCEE
Surf's Up	May 30, 2007	August 3, 2007	Unreleased	August 30, 2007	Ubisoft Montreal	Ubisoft
Susume Tactics! Susume! Mamore! Tatakae!	March 7, 2012	Unreleased	April 12, 2010	Unreleased	RIZ Inc.	TOSE
Suto*Mani: Strobe * Mania	Unreleased	Unreleased	November 23, 2011	Unreleased	D3 Publisher	D3 Publisher
Suzukaze no Melt: Days in the Sanctuary	Unreleased	Unreleased	August 23, 2012	Unreleased	GungHo	Piacci
Suzumiya Haruhi no Tsuisou	Unreleased	Unreleased	May 12, 2011	Unreleased	Bandai Namco Games	Bandai Namco Games
Suzumiya Haruhi no Yakusoku	Unreleased	Unreleased	December 27, 2007	Unreleased	Bandai Namco Games	Bandai Namco Games
Suzumiya Haruhi-Chan no Mahjong	Unreleased	Unreleased	July 7, 2011	Unreleased	Kadokawa	Kadokawa
Suzunone Seven! Portable	Unreleased	Unreleased	January 30, 2014	Unreleased	Clochette	Alchemist
SWAT: Target Liberty	October 16, 2007	October 26, 2007	October 25, 2007	Unreleased	3G Studios	Sierra Entertainment
Sweet Fuse: At Your Side; Bakudan * Handan	August 27, 2013	August 28, 2013	June 14, 2012	August 28, 2013	RIZ Inc.	TOSE
Sword Art Online: Infinity Moment	Unreleased	Unreleased	March 14, 2013	Unreleased	Namco Bandai Games	Namco Bandai Games
Syphon Filter: Combat Ops (Note: Stand-alone expansion of the multiplayer modes of Syphon Filter: Dark Mirror and Syphon Filter: Logan's Shadow.)	November 20, 2007	January 24, 2008	Unreleased	Unreleased	Bend Studio	SCEA / SCEE
Syphon Filter: Dark Mirror	March 14, 2006	September 29, 2006	Unreleased	September 7, 2006	Bend Studio	SCEA / SCEE
Syphon Filter: Logan's Shadow	October 2, 2007	November 30, 2007	December 6, 2007	Unreleased	Bend Studio	SCEA / SCEE
T.A.C. Heroes: Big Red One	April 30, 2013	Unreleased	Unreleased	Unreleased	Storm City Games	Hoplite Research
The Table Game	Unreleased	Unreleased	December 29, 2005	Unreleased	Yuki	Yuki
Tactics Ogre: Let Us Cling Together	February 15, 2011	February 25, 2011	November 11, 2010	Unreleased	Square Enix	Square Enix
Taiheiyou no Arashi: Senkan Yamato, Akatsuki ni Shutsugekisu	Unreleased	Unreleased	January 31, 2008	Unreleased	SystemSoft	SystemSoft
Taiko no Tatsujin Portable	Unreleased	Unreleased	August 4, 2005	Unreleased	Namco	Namco
Taiko no Tatsujin Portable 2	Unreleased	Unreleased	September 7, 2006	Unreleased	Namco	Namco
Taiko no Tatsujin Portable DX	Unreleased	Unreleased	July 14, 2011	Unreleased	Bandai Namco Games	Bandai Namco Games
Taikou Risshiden IV	Unreleased	Unreleased	August 31, 2006	Unreleased	Koei	Koei
Taikou Risshiden V	Unreleased	Unreleased	September 17, 2009	Unreleased	Koei	Koei
Taisen Chess	Unreleased	Unreleased	August 31, 2010	Unreleased	Best Media	Best Media
Taisen Chinchirorin	Unreleased	Unreleased	February 3, 2011	Unreleased	Best Media	Best Media
Taisen Gindan Shooting	Unreleased	Unreleased	January 6, 2011	Unreleased	Best Media	Best Media
Taisen Obake Choice	Unreleased	Unreleased	July 6, 2011	Unreleased	Best Media	Best Media
Taisen Reversi	Unreleased	Unreleased	February 19, 2010	Unreleased	Best Media	Best Media
Taisen Sensuikan Sweeper	Unreleased	Unreleased	February 10, 2011	Unreleased	Best Media	Best Media
Taisen Shogi	Unreleased	Unreleased	July 28, 2010	Unreleased	Best Media	Best Media
Taisen Youkai Doubt	Unreleased	Unreleased	January 10, 2012	Unreleased	Best Media	Best Media
Taisho Yakyuu Musume: Otometachi no Seishun Nikki	Unreleased	Unreleased	October 29, 2009	Unreleased	Suzak	Suzak
Taishou Kitan	Unreleased	Unreleased	December 19, 2013	Unreleased	QuinRose	QuinRose
Taishou Kitan: Koto no Hazakura	Unreleased	Unreleased	October 30, 2014	Unreleased	QuinRose	QuinRose
Taishou Mebiusline Portable	Unreleased	Unreleased	February 27, 2014	Unreleased	dramatic create	dramatic create
Taito Legends Power-Up	May 17, 2007	October 6, 2006	Unreleased	November 9, 2006	Empire Oxford	Empire Interactive / Destineer
Taito Memories Pocket	Unreleased	Unreleased	January 5, 2006	Unreleased	Taito	Taito
Takuyo Mix Box: First Anniversary	Unreleased	Unreleased	July 29, 2010	Unreleased	Takuyo	Takuyo
Tales of Destiny 2	Unreleased	Unreleased	February 15, 2007	Unreleased	Bandai Namco Games	Bandai Namco Games
Tales of Eternia	Unreleased	February 10, 2006	March 3, 2005	February 9, 2006	Namco	Namco
Tales of Rebirth	Unreleased	Unreleased	March 19, 2008	Unreleased	Bandai Namco Games	Bandai Namco Games
Tales of the Heroes: Twin Brave	Unreleased	Unreleased	February 23, 2012	Unreleased	Namco Bandai Games	Namco Bandai Games
Tales of the World: Radiant Mythology	July 17, 2007	September 7, 2007	December 21, 2006	September 6, 2007	Alfa System	Namco Bandai Games
Tales of the World: Radiant Mythology 2	Unreleased	Unreleased	January 29, 2009	Unreleased	Alfa System	Namco Bandai Games
Tales of the World: Radiant Mythology 3	Unreleased	Unreleased	February 10, 2011	Unreleased	Alfa System	Namco Bandai Games
Tales of VS.	Unreleased	Unreleased	August 6, 2009	Unreleased	Namco Tales Studio/Matrix Software	Namco Bandai Games
Tales of Phantasia: Full Voice Edition	Unreleased	Unreleased	March 3, 2005	Unreleased	Namco	Namco
Tales of Phantasia: Narikiri Dungeon X	Unreleased	Unreleased	August 5, 2010	Unreleased	Bandai Namco Games	Bandai Namco Games
Talkman Euro (Note: Primarily a language-learning and translation application, though it includes the unlockable mini-games Double Squash and Piko Poko.)	Unreleased	Unreleased	June 16, 2006	Unreleased	SCEI	SCEI
TalkMan Shiki: Shabe Lingual Eikaiwa for Kids! (Note: Primarily an English-learning application, though it includes mini-games alongside its 750 practice questions.)	Unreleased	Unreleased	June 28, 2007	Unreleased	SCEI	SCEI
Tamayura: Mitama Okuri no Uta	Unreleased	Unreleased	December 15, 2011	Unreleased	CyberFront	CyberFront
Tantei Jinguuji Saburou: Hai to Diamond	Unreleased	Unreleased	September 17, 2009	Unreleased	CyberFront	CyberFront
Tantei Opera Milky Holmes	Unreleased	Unreleased	December 16, 2010	Unreleased	BushiRoad	CyberFront
Tantei Opera Milky Holmes 1.5 Dai-1-Wa: Kessei, Milky Holmes! (Note: Update for Tantei Opera Milky Holmes. An expanded, revised episodic re-release.)	Unreleased	Unreleased	August 25, 2011	Unreleased	BushiRoad	CyberFront
Tantei Opera Milky Holmes 1.5 Dai-2-Wa: Chuukagai no Ougonkyou	Unreleased	Unreleased	September 29, 2011	Unreleased	BushiRoad	CyberFront
Tantei Opera Milky Holmes 1.5 Dai-3-Wa: Norowareshi Maken	Unreleased	Unreleased	October 27, 2011	Unreleased	BushiRoad	CyberFront
Tantei Opera Milky Holmes 1.5 Dai-4-Wa: Adam no Namida	Unreleased	Unreleased	November 24, 2011	Unreleased	BushiRoad	CyberFront
Tantei Opera Milky Holmes 1.5 Dai-5-Wa: Joou Kara no Sasoi	Unreleased	Unreleased	December 22, 2011	Unreleased	BushiRoad	CyberFront
Tantei Opera Milky Holmes 1.5 Dai-6-Wa: Behind the Mask	Unreleased	Unreleased	August 8, 2012	Unreleased	BushiRoad	CyberFront
Tantei Opera Milky Holmes 2	Unreleased	Unreleased	August 23, 2012	Unreleased	BushiRoad	CyberFront
Tanteibu 3-Maki	Unreleased	Unreleased	October 27, 2011	Unreleased	Boost On	Boost On
Tanteibu: The Detective - Angou to Misshitsu to Kaijin to	Unreleased	Unreleased	September 29, 2011	Unreleased	Boost On	Boost On
Tanteibu: The Detective Club - Shissou to Hangeki to Daidanen	Unreleased	Unreleased	November 24, 2011	Unreleased	Boost On	Boost On
Tanteibu: The Detective Club - Tantei to Yuurei to Kaitou to	Unreleased	Unreleased	August 25, 2011	Unreleased	Boost On	Boost On
Tasogare no Sinsemillas Portable	Unreleased	Unreleased	January 17, 2013	Unreleased	Boost On	Boost On
Tasogaredoki: Kaidan Romance	Unreleased	Unreleased	January 31, 2013	Unreleased	Boost On	Boost On
Te to Te Try On! Tropical	Unreleased	Unreleased	March 29, 2012	Unreleased	WillPlus	Boost On
Tears to Tiara Gaiden: Avalon no Nazo Portable	Unreleased	Unreleased	December 16, 2010	Unreleased	Aqua Plus	Aqua Plus
Tears to Tiara: Kakan no Daichi Portable	Unreleased	Unreleased	November 25, 2010	Unreleased	Aqua Plus	Aqua Plus
Tegami Bachi: Koroko Tsumugu Mono e	Unreleased	Unreleased	March 4, 2010	Unreleased	Konami	Konami
Tekken: Dark Resurrection	July 25, 2006	September 15, 2006	July 6, 2006	September 21, 2006	Namco Bandai Games	Namco Bandai Games
Tekken 6	November 24, 2009	December 11, 2009	January 14, 2010	December 17, 2009	Namco Bandai Games	Namco Bandai Games
Telly Addicts	Unreleased	December 7, 2007	Unreleased	Unreleased	Ubisoft	Ubisoft
Tenchu: Shadow Assassins	March 24, 2009	April 3, 2009	February 12, 2009	April 4, 2009	Acquire	Ubisoft
Tenchu: Time of the Assassins	Unreleased	June 23, 2006	July 28, 2005	Unreleased	K2 LLC	FromSoftware / Sega
Tenchi no Mon 2: Busouden	Unreleased	Unreleased	October 19, 2006	Unreleased	Climax Entertainment	SCEI
Tenchou no Igo	Unreleased	Unreleased	October 28, 2010	Unreleased	NCS	NCS
Tengai Makyou Collection	Unreleased	Unreleased	July 31, 2008	Unreleased	NCS	NCS
Tengai Makyou: Dai-Yon no Mokushiroku	Unreleased	Unreleased	July 13, 2006	Unreleased	Hudson Soft	Hudson Soft
Tenjin Ranman: Happy GO Lucky!!	Unreleased	Unreleased	March 25, 2010	Unreleased	Russel	Russel
Test Drive Unlimited	March 21, 2007	March 30, 2007	Unreleased	April 27, 2007	Melbourne House	Atari
Thexder NEO	October 1, 2009	October 1, 2009	October 1, 2009	October 1, 2009	Square Enix	Square Enix
Thrillville	November 21, 2006	February 9, 2007	Unreleased	February 2, 2007	Frontier Developments	LucasArts
Thrillville: Off the Rails	October 9, 2007	Unreleased	October 19, 2007	October 17, 2007	Frontier Developments	LucasArts
Tiger & Bunny : Heroes Day	Unreleased	Unreleased	March 20, 2013	Unreleased	D3 Publisher	D3 Publisher
Tiger & Bunny: On Air Jack	Unreleased	Unreleased	September 20, 2012	Unreleased	Namco Bandai Games	Namco Bandai Games
Tiger Woods PGA Tour	March 24, 2005	October 7, 2005	August 25, 2005	Unreleased	EA Canada	EA Sports
Tiger Woods PGA Tour 06	September 26, 2005	September 26, 2005	February 16, 2006	Unreleased	EA Canada	EA Sports
Tiger Woods PGA Tour 07	October 10, 2006	September 22, 2006	February 16, 2007	Unreleased	EA Canada	EA Sports
Tiger Woods PGA Tour 08	August 28, 2007	October 5, 2007	Unreleased	October 4, 2007	EA Tiburon	EA Sports
Tiger Woods PGA Tour 09	August 26, 2008	August 29, 2008	Unreleased	August 28, 2008	EA Tiburon	EA Sports
Tiger Woods PGA Tour 10	June 8, 2009	July 3, 2009	Unreleased	July 2, 2009	EA Tiburon	EA Sports
Time Travelers	Unreleased	Unreleased	July 19, 2012	Unreleased	Level-5	Level-5
Tir-nan-og: Yuukyuu no Jin	Unreleased	Unreleased	April 29, 2009	Unreleased	SystemSoft	SystemSoft
TMNT	March 20, 2007	March 23, 2007	Unreleased	March 22, 2007	Ubisoft Montreal	Ubisoft
TNA Impact!: Cross the Line	June 29, 2010	June 18, 2010	Unreleased	Unreleased	Midway Studios Los Angeles/Point of View, Inc.	Midway Games
TNT Racers	February 14, 2011	February 16, 2011	Unreleased	Unreleased	Keen Games	DTP Entertainment
To Heart 2 Portable	Unreleased	Unreleased	July 30, 2009	Unreleased	Aquaplus	Aquaplus
To Heart 2: Dungeon Travelers	Unreleased	Unreleased	June 30, 2011	Unreleased	Aquaplus	Aquaplus
To Heart Portable	Unreleased	Unreleased	October 27, 2011	Unreleased	Leaf	Aquaplus
To Love-Ru Trouble: Doki Doki! Rinkaigakkou-Hen	Unreleased	Unreleased	October 2, 2008	Unreleased	Marvelous Entertainment	Marvelous Entertainment
Toaru Kagaku no Chou Denjihou	Unreleased	Unreleased	December 8, 2011	Unreleased	Kadokawa Games	ASCII Media Works
Toaru Majutsu no Index	Unreleased	Unreleased	January 27, 2011	Unreleased	Kadokawa Games	ASCII Media Works
Toaru Majutsu to Kagaku no Ensemble	Unreleased	Unreleased	February 21, 2013	Unreleased	Banpresto, Guyzware	Namco Bandai Games
Tobidase! Trouble Hanafuda Douchuuki	Unreleased	Unreleased	April 19, 2007	Unreleased	Kadokawa	Kadokawa
TOCA Race Driver 2: The Ultimate Racing Simulator	Unreleased	September 1, 2005	December 14, 2006	Unreleased	Sumo Digital	Codemasters
TOCA Race Driver 3 Challenge	Unreleased	February 16, 2007	Unreleased	February 22, 2007	Codemasters	Codemasters
Togainu no Chi: True Blood Portable	Unreleased	Unreleased	December 23, 2010	Unreleased	Kadokawa	Kadokawa
Toki no Kizuna: Hanayui Tsuzuri	Unreleased	Unreleased	July 25, 2013	Unreleased	Otomate	Idea Factory
Toki no Kizuna: Sekigahara Kitan	Unreleased	Unreleased	July 19, 2012	Unreleased	Otomate	Idea Factory
Tokimeki Memorial 4	Unreleased	Unreleased	December 3, 2009	Unreleased	Konami	Konami
Tokimeki Memorial Girl's Side Premium: 3rd Story	Unreleased	Unreleased	March 15, 2012	Unreleased	Konami	Konami
Tokimeki Memorial: Forever With You	Unreleased	Unreleased	March 9, 2006	Unreleased	Konami	Konami
Tokobot	December 5, 2005	April 7, 2006	December 15, 2005	Unreleased	Tecmo	Tecmo
Tokyo Mono Harashi: Karasu no Mori Gakuen Kitan	Unreleased	Unreleased	April 22, 2010	Unreleased	Atlus	Atlus
Tokyo Yamanote Boys Portable: Dark Cherry Disc	Unreleased	Unreleased	February 21, 2013	Unreleased	Rejet	5pb
Tokyo Yamanote Boys Portable: Honey Milk Disc	Unreleased	Unreleased	December 20, 2012	Unreleased	Rejet	5pb
Tokyo Yamanote Boys Portable: Super Mint Disk	Unreleased	Unreleased	January 24, 2013	Unreleased	Rejet	5pb
Tom Clancy's EndWar	November 4, 2008	November 14, 2008	Unreleased	November 7, 2008	Ubisoft Shanghai	Ubisoft
Tom Clancy's Ghost Recon Advanced Warfighter 2	August 23, 2007	August 24, 2007	Unreleased	August 23, 2007	High Voltage Software	Ubisoft
Tom Clancy's Ghost Recon Predator	Unreleased	October 1, 2010	October 7, 2010	Unreleased	Virtuos Games	Ubisoft
Tom Clancy's Rainbow Six: Vegas	June 12, 2007	June 29, 2007	Unreleased	June 28, 2007	Ubisoft Montreal	Ubisoft
Tom Clancy's Splinter Cell: Essentials	March 21, 2006	April 7, 2006	Unreleased	April 6, 2006	Ubisoft Montreal	Ubisoft
Tomb Raider: Anniversary	August 9, 2007	October 26, 2007	March 27, 2008	November 2, 2007	Crystal Dynamics	Eidos Interactive
Tomb Raider: Legend	June 21, 2006	June 9, 2006	December 7, 2006	November 17, 2006	Buzz Monkey Software	Eidos Interactive
Tomoyo After: It's a Wonderful Life - CS Edition	Unreleased	Unreleased	March 19, 2009	Unreleased	Visual Arts	Prototype
Tony Hawk's Project 8	November 21, 2006	June 8, 2007	Unreleased	March 8, 2007	Page 44 Studios	Activision
Tony Hawk's Underground 2: Remix	March 24, 2005	September 1, 2005	Unreleased	Unreleased	Shaba Games	Activision
Toradora! Portable	Unreleased	Unreleased	April 30, 2009	Unreleased	Guyzware	Namco Bandai Games
Toriko: Gourmet Survival	Unreleased	Unreleased	August 4, 2011	Unreleased	Namco Bandai Games	Namco Bandai Games
Toriko: Gourmet Survival 2	Unreleased	Unreleased	July 5, 2012	Unreleased	Namco Bandai Games	Namco Bandai Games
Toudai Shogi: Meijinsen Dojo	Unreleased	Unreleased	October 28, 2010	Unreleased	NCS	NCS
Toukiden	Unreleased	Unreleased	June 27, 2013	Unreleased	Omega Force	Koei Tecmo Games
Toukiden: Kiwami (Note: Update for Toukiden.)	Unreleased	Unreleased	August 28, 2014	Unreleased	Koei Tecmo Games	Koei Tecmo Games
Toy Story 3	June 15, 2010	July 16, 2010	Unreleased	Unreleased	Asobo Studio	Disney Interactive Studios
Transformers: The Game	June 19, 2007	July 20, 2007	Unreleased	July 18, 2007	Savage Entertainment	Activision
Transformers: Revenge of the Fallen	June 23, 2009	June 26, 2009	Unreleased	Unreleased	Savage Entertainment	Activision
Trick x Logic: Season 1	Unreleased	Unreleased	July 22, 2010	Unreleased	ChunSoft	SCEI
Trick x Logic: Season 2	Unreleased	Unreleased	September 16, 2010	Unreleased	ChunSoft	SCEI
Tron: Evolution	Unreleased	November 26, 2010	Unreleased	Unreleased	Propaganda Games	Disney Interactive
Tsugi no Giseisha o Oshirase Shimasu: Houkaisuru Sekai ni Shinigami to	Unreleased	Unreleased	February 9, 2012	Unreleased	Boost On	Boost On
Tsugi no Giseisha o Oshirase Shimasu: Kimi to Ko no Hateru Kotonai Kurayami o	Unreleased	Unreleased	October 6, 2011	Unreleased	Boost On	Boost On
Tsugi no Giseisha o Oshirase Shimasu: Shi to Zetsubou o Norikoete	Unreleased	Unreleased	December 8, 2011	Unreleased	Boost On	Boost On
Tsuku Monogatari	Unreleased	Unreleased	January 27, 2011	Unreleased	FuRyu	FuRyu
Tsuyo Kiss 2 Portable	Unreleased	Unreleased	October 28, 2010	Unreleased	NetRevo	NetRevo
Tsuyo Kiss 3 Gakki Portable	Unreleased	Unreleased	May 31, 2012	Unreleased	NetRevo	NetRevo
Twelve: Sengoku Fengshenden	Unreleased	Unreleased	August 25, 2005	Unreleased	Tenky	Konami
TwinBee Portable	Unreleased	Unreleased	January 25, 2007	Unreleased	M2	Konami
Twinkle * Crusaders GoGo!	Unreleased	Unreleased	September 30, 2010	Unreleased	ASCII Media Works	ASCII Media Works
Twisted Metal: Head-On	March 24, 2005	November 4, 2005	Unreleased	Unreleased	Incognito Entertainment	SCEA / SCEE
UEFA Champions League 2006-2007	March 20, 2007	March 23, 2007	Unreleased	Unreleased	EA Canada	EA Sports
UEFA Euro 2008	May 19, 2008	April 18, 2008	Unreleased	April 17, 2008	EA Canada	EA Sports
UFC Undisputed 2010	September 7, 2010	Unreleased	Unreleased	September 9, 2010	Yuke's	THQ
Ultimate Block Party	December 13, 2005	February 24, 2006	December 16, 2004	Unreleased	Magicpot	Conspiracy Entertainment
Ultimate Board Game Collection	May 1, 2007	May 2, 2008	Unreleased	Unreleased	Jack of All Games	Valcon Games
Ultimate Ghosts'n Goblins	August 29, 2006	September 8, 2006	August 13, 2006	September 14, 2006	Capcom	Capcom
Ultraman All-Star Chronicle	Unreleased	Unreleased	March 7, 2013	Unreleased	Banpresto	Banpresto
Ultraman Fighting Evolution 0	Unreleased	Unreleased	July 20, 2006	Unreleased	Banpresto	Banpresto
Umezawa Yukari no Yasashii Igo	Unreleased	Unreleased	October 9, 2008	Unreleased	NCS	NCS
Umihara Kawase Portable	Unreleased	Unreleased	March 27, 2008	Unreleased	Rocket Studio	Marvelous Entertainment
Umineko no Naku Koro ni Portable 1	Unreleased	Unreleased	October 20, 2011	Unreleased	Alchemist	Alchemist
Umineko no Naku Koro ni Portable 2	Unreleased	Unreleased	November 17, 2011	Unreleased	Alchemist	Alchemist
Unbound Saga	July 16, 2009	July 30, 2009	Unreleased	Unreleased	Vogster Entertainment	Vogster Entertainment
Undead Knights	September 29, 2009	February 26, 2010	October 15, 2009	March 4, 2010	Tecmo	Tecmo
Uno	April 21, 2010	April 22, 2010	April 30, 2010	Unreleased	Gameloft	Gameloft
Untold Legends: Brotherhood of the Blade	March 24, 2005	September 1, 2005	March 23, 2006	Unreleased	Sony Online Entertainment	Sony Online Entertainment
Untold Legends: The Warrior's Code	March 28, 2006	June 30, 2006	October 26, 2006	September 14, 2006	Sony Online Entertainment	Sony Online Entertainment
Unchained Blades EXXiV	Unreleased	Unreleased	November 29, 2012	Unreleased	FuRyu	FuRyu
Unchained Blades	June 26, 2012	Unreleased	July 14, 2011	Unreleased	Zerodiv	Idea Factory / Xseed Games
UnENDing BloodyCall	Unreleased	Unreleased	June 28, 2012	Unreleased	Zerodiv	Idea Factory
The Unou Drill	Unreleased	Unreleased	March 23, 2006	Unreleased	Zerodiv	Idea Factory
Up	May 26, 2009	October 2, 2009	Unreleased	Unreleased	Asobo Studio	THQ
Urakata Hakuouki	Unreleased	Unreleased	June 27, 2013	Unreleased	Zerodiv	Idea Factory
Urakata Hakuouki: Akatsuki no Shirabe	Unreleased	Unreleased	August 7, 2014	Unreleased	Zerodiv	Idea Factory
Utawarerumono Portable	Unreleased	Unreleased	May 28, 2009	Unreleased	Aqua Plus	Aqua Plus
Uta no☆Prince-Sama	Unreleased	Unreleased	June 24, 2010	Unreleased	Broccoli	Broccoli
Uta no☆Prince-Sama: Amazing Aria	Unreleased	Unreleased	February 23, 2012	Unreleased	Broccoli	Broccoli
Uta no☆Prince-Sama: Debut	Unreleased	Unreleased	May 24, 2012	Unreleased	Broccoli	Broccoli
Uta no☆Prince-Sama: All Star	Unreleased	Unreleased	May 24, 2012	Unreleased	Broccoli	Broccoli
Uta no☆Prince-Sama: All Star After Secret	Unreleased	Unreleased	March 12, 2015	Unreleased	Broccoli	Broccoli
Uta no☆Prince-Sama: Music	Unreleased	Unreleased	November 24, 2011	Unreleased	Broccoli	Broccoli
Uta no☆Prince-Sama: Music 2	Unreleased	Unreleased	September 5, 2013	Unreleased	Broccoli	Broccoli
Uta no☆Prince-Sama: Repeat (Note: Update for Uta no☆Prince-Sama.)	Unreleased	Unreleased	February 10, 2011	Unreleased	Broccoli	Broccoli
Uta no☆Prince-Sama: Sweet Serenade	Unreleased	Unreleased	February 10, 2011	Unreleased	Broccoli	Broccoli
Valhalla Knights	April 17, 2007	September 30, 2007	August 31, 2006	August 30, 2007	K2 LLC	Marvelous Entertainment / Xseed Games
Valhalla Knights 2	October 1, 2008	June 27, 2009	May 29, 2008	June 18, 2009	K2 LLC	Marvelous Entertainment / Xseed Games
Valhalla Knights 2: Battle Stance (Note: Update for Valhalla Knights 2.)	January 21, 2010	September 1, 2010	June 25, 2009	Unreleased	K2 LLC	XSEED Games
Valkyrie Profile: Lenneth	July 18, 2006	April 27, 2006	March 2, 2006	May 3, 2007	Tose	Square Enix
Valkyria Chronicles II	August 30, 2010	September 3, 2010	January 21, 2010	September 2, 2010	Sega	Sega
Valkyria Chronicles III	Unreleased	Unreleased	January 27, 2011	Unreleased	Media.Vision	Sega
Valkyria Chronicles III Extra Edition (Note: Update for Valkyria Chronicles III.)	Unreleased	Unreleased	November 23, 2011	Unreleased	Media.Vision	Sega
Vantage Master Portable	Unreleased	Unreleased	April 24, 2008	Unreleased	HuneX	D3 Publisher
Venus & Braves: Majo to Megami to Horobi no Yogen	Unreleased	Unreleased	January 20, 2011	Unreleased	Bandai Namco Games	Bandai Namco Games
Vertigo	March 15, 2011	Unreleased	Unreleased	Unreleased	Icon Games	Icon Games
Viewtiful Joe: Red Hot Rumble	March 22, 2006	May 26, 2006	March 23, 2006	Unreleased	Clover Studio	Capcom
Viorate no Atelier: Gramnad no Renkinjutsushi 2 - Gunjou no Omoide	Unreleased	Unreleased	February 3, 2011	Unreleased	Gust	Gust
Virtua Tennis 3	March 26, 2007	March 30, 2007	Unreleased	March 29, 2007	Sumo Digital	Sega
Virtua Tennis: World Tour	October 7, 2005	September 1, 2005	January 26, 2006	Unreleased	Sumo Digital	Sega
Vitamin R	Unreleased	Unreleased	August 8, 2013	Unreleased	D3 Publisher	D3 Publisher
Vitamin X: Detective B6	Unreleased	Unreleased	February 9, 2012	Unreleased	HuneX	D3 Publisher
Vitamin X Evolution Plus	Unreleased	Unreleased	September 9, 2010	Unreleased	HuneX	D3 Publisher
Vitamin X to Z	Unreleased	Unreleased	February 24, 2011	Unreleased	HuneX	D3 Publisher
Vitamin Z Graduation	Unreleased	Unreleased	January 31, 2013	Unreleased	D3 Publisher	D3 Publisher
Vitamin Z Revolution	Unreleased	Unreleased	March 25, 2010	Unreleased	HuneX	D3 Publisher
Voodoo Dice	May 26, 2010	May 26, 2010	Unreleased	Unreleased	Exkee	Ubisoft
Vulcanus	Unreleased	Unreleased	November 16, 2006	Unreleased	Zeppeto	Compile Heart
Walpurgis no Uta	Unreleased	Unreleased	December 23, 2015	Unreleased	Prototype	Prototype
WALL-E	June 24, 2008	July 4, 2008	Unreleased	September 4, 2008	Asobo Studio / Savage Entertainment	THQ
Wand of Fortune Portable	Unreleased	Unreleased	June 10, 2010	Unreleased	Design Factory	Idea Factory
Wand of Fortune: Mirai e no Prologue Portable	Unreleased	Unreleased	December 2, 2010	Unreleased	Design Factory	Idea Factory
Wand of Fortune 2 FD: Kimi ni Sasageru Epilogue	Unreleased	Unreleased	November 22, 2012	Unreleased	Idea Factory	Idea Factory
Wand of Fortune 2: Jikuu ni Shizumu Mokushiroku	Unreleased	Unreleased	September 29, 2011	Unreleased	Idea Factory	Idea Factory
Wangan Midnight Portable	Unreleased	Unreleased	September 27, 2007	Unreleased	Genki	Genki
Warhammer 40,000: Squad Command	November 12, 2007	November 23, 2007	Unreleased	November 29, 2007	RedLynx	THQ
Warhammer: Battle for Atluma	November 14, 2006	Unreleased	Unreleased	Unreleased	JV Games	Namco Bandai Games
The Warriors	February 12, 2007	February 23, 2007	Unreleased	February 23, 2007	Rockstar Leeds	Rockstar Games
Warriors of the Lost Empire	December 13, 2007	February 1, 2008	January 25, 2007	Unreleased	Goshow	UFO Interactive Games
Warriors Orochi	March 25, 2008	March 28, 2008	February 21, 2008	March 27, 2008	Omega Force	Koei
Warriors Orochi 2	August 25, 2009	September 4, 2009	November 27, 2008	September 3, 2009	Omega Force	Koei
We Love Juggler	Unreleased	Unreleased	March 18, 2010	Unreleased	Kita Denshi	Kita Denshi
Weiss Schwarz Portable: Boost Weiss	Unreleased	Unreleased	November 23, 2011	Unreleased	Namco Bandai Games	Namco Bandai Games
Weiss Schwarz Portable: Boost Schwarz	Unreleased	Unreleased	November 23, 2011	Unreleased	Namco Bandai Games	Namco Bandai Games
What Did I Do To Deserve This, My Lord? 2	April 29, 2010	May 7, 2010	October 16, 2008	Unreleased	Acquire	Nippon Ichi
White Breath: Perfect Edition	Unreleased	Unreleased	September 2, 2010	Unreleased	GN Software	GN Software
White Knight Chronicles: Origins	Unreleased	June 10, 2011	February 3, 2011	Unreleased	Matrix Software	SCEI
Who Wants to Be a Millionaire: Party Edition	Unreleased	December 1, 2006	Unreleased	Unreleased	Eidos Interactive	Eidos Interactive
Wild Arms XF	March 11, 2008	November 28, 2008	August 9, 2007	Unreleased	Media.Vision	SCEI / Xseed Games
Will O' Wisp Portable	Unreleased	Unreleased	March 26, 2009	Unreleased	Idea Factory	Idea Factory
Winning Post 6 2006	Unreleased	Unreleased	August 24, 2006	Unreleased	Koei	Koei
Winning Post 6 2008 (Note: Update for Winning Post 6 2006.)	Unreleased	Unreleased	June 26, 2008	Unreleased	Koei	Koei
Winning Post 7 2009	Unreleased	Unreleased	October 1, 2009	Unreleased	Koei	Koei
Winning Post 7 2010 (Note: Update for Winning Post 7 2009.)	Unreleased	Unreleased	September 22, 2010	Unreleased	Koei Tecmo Games	Koei Tecmo Games
Winning Post 7 2012 (Note: Update for Winning Post 7 2009.)	Unreleased	Unreleased	March 15, 2012	Unreleased	Koei Tecmo Games	Koei Tecmo Games
Winning Post 7 2013 (Note: Update for Winning Post 7 2009.)	Unreleased	Unreleased	March 14, 2013	Unreleased	Koei Tecmo Games	Koei Tecmo Games
Winx Club: Join the Club	May 7, 2007	May 25, 2007	Unreleased	December 15, 2006	n-Space	Konami
Wizardry Empire III	Unreleased	Unreleased	January 18, 2007	Unreleased	Starfish SD	Starfish SD
Wipeout Pulse	February 12, 2008	December 14, 2007	Unreleased	December 13, 2007	Studio Liverpool	SCEE / SCEA
Wipeout Pure	March 24, 2005	September 1, 2005	April 7, 2005	September 1, 2005	Studio Liverpool	SCEA / SCEI / SCEE
World Championship Cards	May 30, 2008	Unreleased	Unreleased	Unreleased	Crave Entertainment	Crave Entertainment
World Championship Poker 2: Featuring Howard Lederer	December 11, 2005	October 19, 2007	Unreleased	Unreleased	Crave Entertainment	Crave Entertainment
World Championship Poker: Featuring Howard Lederer "All In"	September 5, 2006	Unreleased	March 13, 2008	Unreleased	Point of View, Inc.	Crave Entertainment
World of Pool	Unreleased	August 31, 2007	Unreleased	Unreleased	Icon Games	Ghostlight
World Neverland 2-in-1 Portable	Unreleased	Unreleased	June 26, 2008	Unreleased	fonfun	fonfun
World Neverland: Kukuria Oukoku Monogatari	Unreleased	Unreleased	March 20, 2013	Unreleased	Althi	Althi
World Neverland: Naruru Oukoku Monogatari	Unreleased	Unreleased	June 14, 2012	Unreleased	Althi	Althi
World Poker Tour	April 17, 2006	June 2, 2006	Unreleased	April 7, 2006	Coresoft	2K Sports
World Series of Poker	September 15, 2005	February 24, 2006	Unreleased	Unreleased	Left Field Productions	Activision
World Series of Poker 2008: Battle for the Bracelets	November 6, 2007	December 14, 2007	Unreleased	December 12, 2007	Left Field Productions	Activision
World Series of Poker: Tournament of Champions	September 21, 2006	February 9, 2007	Unreleased	December 13, 2006	Left Field Productions	Activision
World Snooker Challenge 2005	Unreleased	September 1, 2005	Unreleased	Unreleased	Blade Interactive	Sega
World Snooker Challenge 2007	Unreleased	January 12, 2007	Unreleased	February 15, 2007	Blade Interactive	Sega
World Soccer Winning Eleven 2010: Aoki Samurai no Chousen (Note: Update for Pro Evolution Soccer 2010.)	Unreleased	Unreleased	May 20, 2010	Unreleased	Konami	Konami
World Soccer Winning Eleven 2014: Aoki Samurai no Chousen (Note: Update for Pro Evolution Soccer 2014.)	Unreleased	Unreleased	May 22, 2014	Unreleased	Konami	Konami
World Tour Soccer: Challenge Edition; World Tour Soccer	March 24, 2005	September 1, 2005	Unreleased	Unreleased	London Studio	SCEA
World Tour Soccer 06; World Tour Soccer 2	June 27, 2006	June 23, 2006	Unreleased	Unreleased	London Studio	SCEA
Worms: Battle Islands	October 22, 2010	November 24, 2010	Unreleased	November 24, 2010	Team17	Team17
Worms: Open Warfare	March 22, 2006	March 24, 2006	Unreleased	Unreleased	Team17	THQ
Worms: Open Warfare 2	September 4, 2007	August 31, 2007	Unreleased	August 30, 2007	Team17	THQ
WRC: World Rally Championship	April 18, 2008	November 18, 2005	March 9, 2006	Unreleased	Traveller's Tales	Namco Bandai Games
WTF: Work Time Fun	October 17, 2006	Unreleased	December 22, 2005	Unreleased	Japan Studio	D3 Publisher
WWE All Stars	March 29, 2011	April 1, 2011	Unreleased	March 31, 2011	THQ	THQ
WWE SmackDown! vs. Raw 2006	December 13, 2005	December 16, 2005	October 12, 2006	Unreleased	Yuke's	THQ
WWE SmackDown vs. Raw 2007	December 6, 2006	December 15, 2006	February 22, 2007	December 23, 2006	Yuke's	THQ
WWE SmackDown vs. Raw 2008	November 13, 2007	November 9, 2007	Unreleased	November 22, 2007	Yuke's	THQ
WWE SmackDown vs. Raw 2009	November 9, 2008	November 7, 2008	Unreleased	November 6, 2008	Yuke's	THQ
WWE SmackDown vs. Raw 2010	October 20, 2009	October 20, 2009	Unreleased	October 22, 2009	Yuke's	THQ
WWE SmackDown vs. Raw 2011	October 26, 2010	Unreleased	Unreleased	October 28, 2010	Yuke's	THQ
WWII: Battle Over The Pacific	Unreleased	May 9, 2008	Unreleased	May 24, 2008	Midas Interactive Entertainment	Midas Interactive Entertainment
XI Coliseum	Unreleased	Unreleased	March 9, 2006	Unreleased	Shift	SCEI
X-Men Legends II: Rise of Apocalypse	October 18, 2005	November 25, 2005	Unreleased	Unreleased	Vicarious Visions	Activision
X-Men Origins: Wolverine	May 1, 2009	May 1, 2009	Unreleased	April 29, 2009	Raven Software	Activision
Xiaolin Showdown	November 14, 2006	June 29, 2007	Unreleased	March 2007	Bottlerocket Entertainment	Konami
Xyanide Resurrection	Unreleased	August 31, 2007	December 27, 2007	Unreleased	Playlogic Game Factory	Playlogic Entertainment
Yamikara no Izanai: Tenebrae I	Unreleased	Unreleased	August 30, 2012	Unreleased	Boost On	Boost On
Yamada Yuusuke World Puzzle: Bokura no 48 Jikan Sensou	Unreleased	Unreleased	November 26, 2009	Unreleased	Kadokawa	Kadokawa
Yamamura Misa Suspense: Kyoto Kurama Sansou Satsujin Jiken	Unreleased	Unreleased	September 3, 2009	Unreleased	Marvelous Entertainment	Marvelous Entertainment
Yamasa Digi Portable: Matsuri no Tatsujin - Win-Chan no Natsumatsuri	Unreleased	Unreleased	August 10, 2006	Unreleased	Piacci	Piacci
Yaneura no Kanojo	Unreleased	Unreleased	December 20, 2012	Unreleased	Piacci	Piacci
Yarudora Portable: Yukiwari no Hana	Unreleased	Unreleased	July 28, 2005	Unreleased	Sony Computer Entertainment	Sony Computer Entertainment
Yoake Mae Yori Ruriiro na Portable	Unreleased	Unreleased	February 25, 2010	Unreleased	eterire	eterire
Yoiyo Mori no Hime	Unreleased	Unreleased	March 26, 2015	Unreleased	eterire	eterire
Your Diary+	Unreleased	Unreleased	November 28, 2013	Unreleased	Cube	Alchemist
Your Memories Off: Girl's Style	Unreleased	Unreleased	February 26, 2009	Unreleased	5pb	5pb
Yggdra Union	September 16, 2008	Unreleased	January 24, 2008	Unreleased	Sting Entertainment	Atlus; Sting Entertainment; 505 Games
Ys Seven	August 17, 2010	Unreleased	September 17, 2009	Unreleased	Nihon Falcom	Nihon Falcom / Xseed Games
Ys: The Ark of Napishtim	February 28, 2006	September 29, 2006	January 19, 2006	October 6, 2006	Nihon Falcom	Nihon Falcom / Konami
Ys: The Oath in Felghana	November 2, 2010	Unreleased	April 22, 2010	Unreleased	Nihon Falcom	Nihon Falcom / Xseed Games
Ys I & II Chronicles	February 21, 2011	Unreleased	July 16, 2009	Unreleased	Nihon Falcom	Nihon Falcom / XSEED Games
Ys vs. Trails in the Sky	Unreleased	Unreleased	July 29, 2010	Unreleased	Nihon Falcom	Nihon Falcom
Yu-Gi-Oh! 5D's: Tag Force 4	November 18, 2009	January 22, 2010	September 17, 2009	Unreleased	Konami	Konami
Yu-Gi-Oh! 5D's: Tag Force 5	October 26, 2010	November 26, 2010	September 16, 2010	Unreleased	Konami	Konami
Yu-Gi-Oh! 5D's: Tag Force 6	Unreleased	Unreleased	September 22, 2011	Unreleased	Konami	Konami
Yu-Gi-Oh! Arc-V Tag Force Special	Unreleased	Unreleased	January 22, 2015	Unreleased	Konami	Konami
Yu-Gi-Oh! Duel Monsters GX: Tag Force; Yu-Gi-Oh! GX: Tag Force	November 14, 2006	March 2, 2007	September 14, 2006	October 12, 2007	Konami	Konami
Yu-Gi-Oh! Duel Monsters GX: Tag Force 2 Yu-Gi-Oh! GX: Tag Force 2	September 18, 2007	December 7, 2007	September 27, 2007	Unreleased	Konami	Konami
Yu-Gi-Oh! Duel Monsters GX: Tag Force 3 Yu-Gi-Oh! GX: Tag Force 3	Unreleased	November 28, 2008	November 27, 2008	February 12, 2009	Konami	Konami
Yukiwari no Hana	Unreleased	Unreleased	July 28, 2005	Unreleased	SCEI	SCEI
Yuusha 30 Second	Unreleased	Unreleased	August 4, 2011	Unreleased	Marvelous Entertainment	Marvelous Entertainment
Zendoku	Unreleased	April 20, 2007	May 18, 2007	Unreleased	Zoonami	Eidos Interactive
Zero Pilot: Daisanji Sekai Taisen 1946	Unreleased	Unreleased	November 13, 2008	Unreleased	Marionette	Global A
Zero Shiki Kanjou Sentouki Ni	Unreleased	Unreleased	January 10, 2008	Unreleased	Global A	Global A
Zettai Meikyuu Grimm: Nanatsu no Kagi to Rakuen no Otome	Unreleased	Unreleased	April 28, 2010	Unreleased	Karin Entertainment	Karin Entertainment
Zettai Zetsumei Toshi 3	Unreleased	Unreleased	April 23, 2009	Unreleased	Irem	Irem
Z.H.P. Unlosing Ranger VS. Darkdeath Evilman	October 26, 2010	Unreleased	March 11, 2010	Unreleased	Nippon Ichi	Nippon Ichi
Zill O'll Infinite Plus	Unreleased	Unreleased	January 22, 2009	Unreleased	Koei	Koei
Zodiac	Unreleased	Unreleased	April 1, 2010	Unreleased	Hopemoon	Hopemoon
Zoku Susume! Mamore! Tatakae!	Unreleased	Unreleased	April 12, 2011	Unreleased	RIZ Inc.	RIZ Inc.
Zuma	August 23, 2010	Unreleased	Unreleased	Unreleased	PopCap	PopCap
Zwei: The Arges Adventure	Unreleased	Unreleased	December 11, 2008	Unreleased	Nihon Falcom	Nihon Falcom

== Applications ==
Title	North America	Europe	Japan	Australia	Developer	Publisher
Azumanga Daioh 1	Unreleased	Unreleased	December 21, 2015	Unreleased	King Records	King Records
Beaterator	September 29, 2009	October 2, 2009	Unreleased	October 2, 2009	Rockstar Leeds	Rockstar Games
Bijin Tokei Portable	Unreleased	Unreleased	August 10, 2010	Unreleased	HuneX	HuneX
Chotto Shot	Unreleased	Unreleased	November 2, 2006	Unreleased	SCEI	SCEI
The Cryptics	June 12, 2008	June 12, 2008	Unreleased	Unreleased	D2C Games	D2C Games
The Legend of Heroes: Trails in the Sky Material Collection Portable	Unreleased	Unreleased	December 20, 2007	Unreleased	Nihon Falcom	Nihon Falcom
Final Fantasy VII: Advent Children	April 25, 2006	April 24, 2006	September 14, 2005	Unreleased	Square Enix	Square Enix
GO! Edit	Unreleased	2007	Unreleased	Unreleased	NavNGo	SCEE
Go!Cam	Unreleased	May 15, 2007	Unreleased	Unreleased	NavNGo	SCEE
Go!Explore	Unreleased	July 25, 2008	Unreleased	Unreleased	NavNGo	SCEE
Go!Messenger	Unreleased	February 29, 2008	Unreleased	Unreleased	NavNGo	SCEE
Hand Dic	Unreleased	Unreleased	December 1, 2005	Unreleased	SCEA	SCEA Korea
Honki de Manabu LEC de Goukakuru: Takuchi Tatemono Torihiki Shuninsha Portable	Unreleased	Unreleased	January 21, 2010	Unreleased	Square Enix	Square Enix
Just English	Unreleased	Unreleased	June 16, 2006	Unreleased	Winglish	Winglish
Kanji Trainer Portable	Unreleased	Unreleased	December 14, 2006	Unreleased	Sega	Sega
Keibatsuu Portable	Unreleased	Unreleased	May 15, 2008	Unreleased	NCS	NCS
Keibatsuu Portable 2: JRA Koushiki Data 23 Nenbun Shuuroku	Unreleased	Unreleased	April 16, 2009	Unreleased	NCS	NCS
Kikuite Oboeru Eitango: Arc no Kikutan Advanced	Unreleased	Unreleased	April 23, 2009	Unreleased	Success	Success
Kikuite Oboeru Eitango: Arc no Kikutan Basic	Unreleased	Unreleased	April 23, 2009	Unreleased	Success	Success
Kikuite Oboeru Eitango: Arc no Kikutan Entry	Unreleased	Unreleased	April 23, 2009	Unreleased	Success	Success
Maplus Portable Navi 3: 2011 Nendohan	Unreleased	Unreleased	October 13, 2011	Unreleased	Edia Co.	Edia Co.
Maplus: Portable Navi	Unreleased	Unreleased	December 14, 2006	Unreleased	Edia Co.	Edia Co.
Maplus: Portable Navi 2	Unreleased	Unreleased	December 20, 2007	Unreleased	Edia Co.	Edia Co.
Maplus: Portable Navi 3	Unreleased	Unreleased	October 19, 2009	Unreleased	Edia Co.	Edia Co.
Maru Goukaku + NextRev: Kihon Jouhou Gijutsusha Shiken Portable	Unreleased	Unreleased	May 30, 2013	Unreleased	Media5	Media5
Maru Goukaku + NextRev: Sharoushi Shiken Portable	Unreleased	Unreleased	May 30, 2013	Unreleased	Media5	Media5
Maru Goukaku + NextRev: Takken Shikken Portable	Unreleased	Unreleased	May 30, 2013	Unreleased	Media5	Media5
Maru Goukaku: Shikaku Dasshu! Care Manager Shiken Portable	Unreleased	Unreleased	May 31, 2012	Unreleased	Media5	Media5
Maru Goukaku: Shikaku Dasshu! Chuushoukigyou Shindanshi Shiken 1 Portable	Unreleased	Unreleased	January 26, 2012	Unreleased	Media5	Media5
Maru Goukaku: Shikaku Dasshu! Chuushoukigyou Shindanshi Shiken 2 Portable	Unreleased	Unreleased	January 26, 2012	Unreleased	Media5	Media5
Maru Goukaku: Shikaku Dasshu! FP Financial Planning Ginou Kentei Shiken 2-Kyuu Portable	Unreleased	Unreleased	November 23, 2011	Unreleased	Media5	Media5
Maru Goukaku: Shikaku Dasshu! FP Financial Planning Ginou Kentei Shiken 3-Kyuu Portable	Unreleased	Unreleased	November 23, 2011	Unreleased	Media5	Media5
Maru Goukaku: Shikaku Dasshu! IT Passport Shiken Portable	Unreleased	Unreleased	September 1, 2011	Unreleased	Media5	Media5
Maru Goukaku: Shikaku Dasshu! Kihon Jouhou Gijutsusha Shiken Portable	Unreleased	Unreleased	September 8, 2011	Unreleased	Media5	Media5
Maru Goukaku: Shikaku Dasshu! Ouyou Jouhou Gijutsusha Shiken Portable	Unreleased	Unreleased	September 8, 2011	Unreleased	Media5	Media5
Maru Goukaku: Shikaku Dasshu! Sharoushi Shiken Portable	Unreleased	Unreleased	December 22, 2011	Unreleased	Media5	Media5
Maru Goukaku: Shikaku Dasshu! Shouken Gaimuin Shiken Portable	Unreleased	Unreleased	May 17, 2012	Unreleased	Media5	Media5
Maru Goukaku: Shikaku Dasshu! Takken Shiken Portable	Unreleased	Unreleased	February 23, 2012	Unreleased	Media5	Media5
Maru Goukaku: Shikaku Dasshu! TOEIC Test Portable	Unreleased	Unreleased	March 22, 2012	Unreleased	Media5	Media5
Me de Unou o Kitaeru: Sokudoku Jutsu Portable	Unreleased	Unreleased	June 28, 2007	Unreleased	MileStone Inc.	MileStone Inc.
Minna de Dokusho: Genji Monogatari + Chottodake Bungaku	Unreleased	Unreleased	November 5, 2009	Unreleased	Dorart	Dorart
Minna de Dokusho: Keatai Shousetsu Desu	Unreleased	Unreleased	October 23, 2008	Unreleased	Dorart	Dorart
Minna de Dokusho: Meisaku & Suiri & Kaidan & Bungaku	Unreleased	Unreleased	July 3, 2008	Unreleased	Dorart	Dorart
Minna de Dokusho: Torimonochou	Unreleased	Unreleased	November 19, 2009	Unreleased	Dorart	Dorart
Minna no Chizu	Unreleased	Unreleased	April 20, 2006	Unreleased	Zenrin	Zenrin
Minna no Chizu 2	Unreleased	Unreleased	April 26, 2007	Unreleased	Zenrin	Zenrin
Minna no Chizu 2 Chiiki-Han: Chuunichimoto-Han	Unreleased	Unreleased	August 9, 2007	Unreleased	Zenrin	Zenrin
Minna no Chizu 2 Chiiki-Han: Higashinichimoto-Han	Unreleased	Unreleased	August 9, 2007	Unreleased	Zenrin	Zenrin
Minna no Chizu 2 Chiiki-Han: Nishinippon-Hen	Unreleased	Unreleased	August 9, 2007	Unreleased	Zenrin	Zenrin
Minna no Navi	Unreleased	Unreleased	November 19, 2009	Unreleased	Zenrin	Zenrin
Minna no Shiatsu: Itami mo Tsukare mo Sukirii!	Unreleased	Unreleased	March 18, 2010	Unreleased	Dorart	Dorart
Minna to Chizu 3	Unreleased	Unreleased	April 24, 2008	Unreleased	Zenrin	Zenrin
MyStylist	Unreleased	Unreleased	February 28, 2008	Unreleased	Crispy's	SCEI
Otsuge Uranai nan desu.	Unreleased	Unreleased	December 18, 2008	Unreleased	Dorart	Dorart
Passport to Amsterdam	Unreleased	September 22, 2006	Unreleased	Unreleased	SCEE London Studio	SCEE
Passport to Barcelona	Unreleased	September 22, 2006	Unreleased	Unreleased	SCEE London Studio	SCEE
Passport to London	Unreleased	September 22, 2006	Unreleased	Unreleased	SCEE London Studio	SCEE
Passport to Paris	Unreleased	September 22, 2006	Unreleased	Unreleased	SCEE London Studio	SCEE
Passport to Prague	Unreleased	September 22, 2006	Unreleased	Unreleased	SCEE London Studio	SCEE
Passport to Rome	Unreleased	September 22, 2006	Unreleased	Unreleased	SCEE London Studio	SCEE
Planetarium Creator Ohira Takayuki Kanshuu: Home Star Portable	Unreleased	Unreleased	October 19, 2006	Unreleased	Sega	Sega
Pro Atlas Travel Guide	Unreleased	Unreleased	August 9, 2007	Unreleased	Edia Co.	Edia Co.
PSP Web Browser	2005	2005	2005	2005	SCEA	SCEA
The Silent Hill Experience	June 5, 2006	June 6, 2006	Unreleased	Unreleased	Konami	Konami
Talkman	Unreleased	Unreleased	November 17, 2005	Unreleased	SCEI	SCEI
TalkMan Shiki: Shabe Lingual Eikaiwa	Unreleased	Unreleased	January 18, 2007	Unreleased	SCEI	SCEI
TalkMan Travel	Unreleased	Unreleased	December 13, 2007	Unreleased	SCEI	SCEI
TalkMan Travel: Paris	Unreleased	Unreleased	August 7, 2008	Unreleased	SCEI	SCEI
TalkMan Travel: Rome	Unreleased	Unreleased	August 7, 2008	Unreleased	SCEI	SCEI
TalkMan Travel: Tokyo	Unreleased	Unreleased	August 7, 2008	Unreleased	SCEI	SCEIopen
Traxxpad	June 26, 2007	Unreleased	Unreleased	Unreleased	Definitive Studios	Eidos Interactive
Win-JPT Japanese Beginners	Unreleased	Unreleased	December 29, 2006	Unreleased	Studio9	Studio9
Win-TOEIC Beginners' LC	Unreleased	Unreleased	September 30, 2005	Unreleased	Studio9	Studio9
Win-TOEIC Beginners' RC	Unreleased	Unreleased	December 14, 2005	Unreleased	Studio9	Studio9
Win-TOEIC LC	Unreleased	Unreleased	November 9, 2006	Unreleased	Studio9	Studio9
Winglish	Unreleased	Unreleased	April 13, 2006	Unreleased	Studio9	Studio9
x-Radar Portable Ver. 3.00	Unreleased	Unreleased	November 24, 2010	Unreleased	Sony Marketing	Sony Marketing

== See also ==
- List of downloadable PlayStation Portable games
- List of PlayStation minis
