= DJMax Respect =

2017 rhythm video game

DJMax Respect / DJMax Respect V
- Developers: Rocky Studio; Neowiz MUCA
- Publisher: Neowiz Games
- Director: Kim Daeik (juking)
- Producer: Baek Seungcheol (BEXTER)
- Designers: Baek SeungCheol (BEXTER), Li Junseob (DumpingLIFE)
- Engine: Unity
- Platforms: PlayStation 4 PlayStation 5 Microsoft Windows; Xbox One; Xbox Series X/S
- Release: PlayStation 4: AS: July 28, 2017; JPN: November 9, 2017; WW: March 6, 2018; Microsoft Windows: WW: March 12, 2020; Xbox One and Series X/S: WW: July 7, 2022
- Genre: Music
- Modes: Single-player, multiplayer

DJMax Respect is a Korean-language rhythm game developed by Rocky Studio and Neowiz MUCA and published by Neowiz Games. It is the latest installment in the DJMax series. It was released for the PlayStation 4 in 2017, for Microsoft Windows in 2020, and Xbox One and Xbox Series X/S in 2022 as part of ID@Xbox. In Japan, the game was published by Arc System Works.

The PC port of this game, called DJMax Respect V (styled as DJMAX RESPECT/V) launched on December 19, 2019, through Steam Early Access, and was fully released on March 12, 2020. Later on, the XBOX version of RESPECT/V has been launched on July 7, 2022. It is available across consoles, the Xbox Live Windows 10 version, and the Xbox Cloud Gaming services. This also marks the first DJMax game to be released on an Xbox console.

== Features ==
A sample screenshot released at announcement.

- The base game includes 107 songs from DJMax Portable and DJMax Portable 2, along with 40 all-new songs produced for Respect. Respect V includes five more songs in the base game.
- A selection of 187 songs from past DJMax games (Trilogy, Portable Clazziquai Edition, Technika, Portable Black Square, Technika 2, Technika 3, Online [Emotional Sense], Portable 3, Technika Tune and Technika Q) are available as paid Legacy downloadable content packs, which also collectively include customization items and 9 all-new songs made for Respect.
- A selection of 49 songs has been available for Respect as paid Collaboration DLC packs, each of which also includes customization items. These packs are also made available for Respect V.
- Respect V includes a series of exclusive downloadable content packs, from Extension packs consisting of all-new songs made for Respect to Collaboration packs, amounting to over 200 songs and 40 customization items.
- A selection of songs from DJMax Ray and the Tap Sonic spin-off game series (Tap Sonic, Tap Sonic Top, Tap Sonic World Champion and Tap Sonic Bold) are periodically added to Respect V via Ladder Mode season updates.
- Between April 2019 and June 2022, the game included a first season of DLC packs from one to five, known as V EXTENSION.
- Between November 2023 and December 2025, the game included a second season of DLC packs from one to four, known as V LIBERTY.
- All background animations from previous games have been updated and remastered to support a 1080p resolution at 60 frames per second.
- The scoring system has been overhauled to reflect that of Technika 2 and Technika 3. Each song has a base score of 300,000 points for the original PS4 version and 1,000,000 points for Respect V, the maximum score that can be achieved without utilizing the score multiplier derived from the Fever system.
- Online Battle mode, in which two players can play against one another to aim for the highest scores. Each player can play different chart difficulties of the same song concurrently.
- In-game achievements have been implemented. The achievement system is used to unlock in-game content such as new songs, interface skins, online profile accessories, and artwork. Most PlayStation Network trophies, Steam achievements, and Xbox achievements for the game are tied to this system as well.

=== Removed features ===
- Certain types of Gear present in previous games, such as Max LP, Anti-Break, Shield and extended Fever multipliers, have been removed for balancing purposes in conjunction with the inclusion of online leaderboards.
- Note speed increase and lockdown with the activation of Fever has been removed.
- Auto Fever no longer has any negative effect on the score.

=== Game modes ===
DJMax Respect features 6 primary game modes.

- Arcade: The standard single-player mode in which the player selects three songs from a randomly generated list of purchased songs, including songs yet to be unlocked for the Freestyle mode.
- Freestyle: Free play mode in which the player can select any song from the list of all songs which have been unlocked for the mode. This mode features local competitive play for the first time in the series.
- Mission: A mode that requires the player to clear a predetermined set of songs with certain conditions, such as unusual effectors, meeting score and/or combo requirements, and so on.
- Online: A multiplayer mode that allows the player to compete against another player from around the world via the internet. This mode requires a PlayStation Plus subscription.
- Ranking: Allows the player to view the rankings of players from around the world. Scores are automatically submitted to the online leaderboard during normal play as long as the player is connected to the internet.
- Collection: Allows the player to customize their profile, view their lifetime stats and completed achievements, and view unlocked extras such as artwork and music videos, similar to the "Lounge Room" in Portable 3.

=== Exclusive Respect V features ===
- New redesigned SC chart for play on keyboard with 8-10 keys.
- New game modes emphasizing on the online features:
  - AIR Mode : Replacing the original PS4 version's ARCADE mode, players will be able to join sessions of continuous, random playlists, during which they can choose to play or watch an auto-play of the song, as well as leave comments for other players to read.
  - OPEN Mode : An enhancement to the original PS4 version's ONLINE mode, up to 7 players can play against each other to aim for the highest scores. Players can also set up a two-player game session with up to 6 other players, during which the loser of each game will be replaced by another player.
  - LADDER Mode : Two-player online competitive mode, where players compete against each other to climb up the tiers from Bronze to Grandmaster. Includes player tier leaderboard, pick-and-ban, and Clear Pass. The first season commenced on January 28, 2021.
  - Crossplay enabled for Steam, Xbox One, Xbox Series X and Series S, Xbox Live Windows 10/11 client and Xbox Cloud Gaming.
- New exclusive songs, including K/DA from League of Legends, Marshmello, Porter Robinson, and lots more.
- Crossover tracks from other rhythm games, including Arcaea, Cytus, Deemo, Muse Dash, CHUNITHM, and O.N.G.E.K.I.

== Development and release ==
DJMax Respect was developed by Rocky Studio, a subsidiary of Neowiz. It was directed by Baek Seungcheol, who developed the DJMax games since the first game, DJMax Online.

A Windows port titled DJMax Respect V was released as early access via Steam on 19 December 2019. A full release was launched on 12 March 2020.

== Reception ==
Reception

Aggregate score
| Aggregator | Score |
|---|---|
| Metacritic | 85/100 (PS4) |

Review scores
| Publication | Score |
|---|---|
| Destructoid | 9/10 |
| Hardcore Gamer | 4.5/5 |
| Jeuxvideo.com | 17/20 |
| Digitally Downloaded | 4/5 |
| Gamekult | 8/10 |
| Meristation | 8.5/10 |

On its release, DJMax Respect was met with "generally favorable" reviews from critics according to review aggregator website Metacritic.

The PC Steam, PC Xbox Live, and Xbox version of the game has been criticized for using XIGNCODE3, an anti-cheat software that forces games that use it to always be online, thus preventing offline play even when playing single-player.
