= Neowiz =

South Korean video game company

Neowiz Holdings Corporation
- Native name: 주식회사 네오위즈홀딩스
- Formerly: Neowiz
- Type: Public
- Traded as: KRX: 042420
- Industry: Video games
- Founded: 1997; 29 years ago
- Founder: Na Sung Kyun
- Headquarters: Seongnam, South Korea
- Key people: Na Sung Kyun (Chairman of the Board); Kim Sang Wook (CEO)
- Website: nwhcorp.com/holdings/en

Neowiz
- Native name: 네오위즈
- Formerly: Neowiz Games Corporation
- Type: Public
- Traded as: KRX: 095660
- Industry: Video games
- Founded: 2007; 19 years ago
- Headquarters: Seongnam, South Korea
- Key people: Kim Seungcheol (co-CEO); Bae Taegeun (co-CEO)
- Products: DJMax; Lies of P
- Parent: Neowiz Holdings
- Website: neowiz.com

Neowiz (Korean: 네오위즈) is a South Korean video game developer and publisher. The company was founded in 1997 by Sung Kyun Na. In 2007, a corporate restructuring resulted in the creation of Neowiz Holdings, which became the parent company overseeing various subsidiaries, including the gaming business. In 2017, the gaming division was rebranded as Neowiz. The company is best known for the DJMax series and Lies of P.

== History ==
Neowiz was founded in 1997 by 8 friends, including current Chairman of the Board Na Sung Kyun and Chang Byung Gyu, both graduates of the Korea Advanced Institute of Science and Technology. The name is a combination of the words "new" (neo) and "wizard" (wiz). The company started off as an internet content provider by developing LiveCAST, a service that delivered customizable information (e.g. news, weather, etc.) to its subscribers online. Neowiz was not able to secure enough subscribers to maintain profitability due to the lack of affordable and simple internet access. However, it was able to stay afloat by providing software development services to internet service providers in Korea and Europe.

Neowiz recognized that it was too difficult for end users to set up an internet connection and thus launched OneClick, a service allowing users to connect to the internet with one click, in April 1998. OneClick allowed users to "connect to the internet directly with one click" and users were charged according to the duration of their connection. While the product initially helped them gain widespread recognition, demand for OneClick began to decline in 2000, due to the spread of high-speed broadband internet access. In 2000, OneClick's revenue contribution was around 90%, but dropped below 12% in 2002.

Neowiz realized that with the rise of broadband internet access and the decline of OneClick's profits, it would need a new product. Therefore the company launched SayClub, an online community site with real-time communication, in July 1999. Within 3 months SayClub was able to attract 1 million users and within a year this number grew to 3 million. The service was free to use and revenue from advertisements was not able to cover the expenses. To make SayClub profitable, Neowiz thus introduced avatars in November 2000. Users could purchase clothes and accessories with money to personalize their virtual characters. This feature was an instant success and generated sales of more than $330,000 in the first month. In June 2000, Neowiz was listed on KOSDAQ.

As the market of online communities became saturated and the increasing popularity of digital cameras pushed users to portray themselves with their own photographs, Neowiz once again had to come up with a new business idea. It carried out a survey on SayClub to gather user feedback on desired new features and found out that the users wanted "more fun". Thus, Neowiz added board games to SayClub in 2002 after acquiring the game development company MCUBE in September 2001. In August 2003, it launched pmang, a new platform specifically for video games. By November of the same year, pmang was the most visited game portal in Korea, due to a large scale marketing campaign online and offline. By 2007 pmang offered 23 tabletop games, like poker and mahjong, and 16 advanced casual games and MMORPGs, with more than 30 games in development.

When CEO Sung Kyun Na came back to Neowiz after completing his military service in March 2005, he reorganized the company to focus on video games. In April 2006, Neowiz Japan, a new Japanese subsidiary, was opened and launched a game portal named Gamechu. In the same year, Neowiz also acquired the rhythm game developer Pentavision. In April 2007, the company was converted into a holding company, was renamed to Neowiz Holdings and was segmented into three entities: Neowiz Games Corporation which would focus on the development and publishing of video games, Neowiz Internet Corporation which would concentrate on the Internet business including SayClub and Neowiz Invest Corporation which would participate in both local and international investments. In July 2007, Neowiz Games Corporation was listed on KOSDAQ. In the same year, it acquired the Japanese video game developer GameOn. In March 2017, Neowiz Games Corporation was renamed to Neowiz.

Around 2015, Neowiz started developing and publishing for home consoles and Steam, but their main focus in the late 2010s and early 2020s was on smartphone games: It acquired multiple developers of smartphone games and also launched their own games on the mobile platforms. With the development of Lies of P, which started around 2020, Neowiz started to shift their focus to console and PC titles and as of 2024, more than 80% of their games are for those platforms. Co-CEO Kim Seungcheol described Lies of P as a "major pivot in the company's overall direction" that enabled them to concentrate on "building franchises that have strong intellectual property".

In November 2023, Neowiz spent $17 million to acquire a 21% stake in BLANK., a video game development studio founded by former CD Projekt Red employees.

== Games ==
Year	Title	Platform	Developer	Ref.
2007	DJMax Portable 2	PSP	Pentavision	
2008	DJMax Portable Black Square	PSP	Pentavision	
2008	DJMax Technika	Arcade	Pentavision	
2008	DJMax Trilogy	Windows	Pentavision	
2009	DJMax Fever	PSP	Pentavision	
2010	DJMax Portable 3	PSP	Pentavision	
2010	DJMax Portable Hot Tunes	PSP	Pentavision	
2010	Battlefield Online	Windows	Neowiz Games	
2010	DJMax Technika 2	Arcade	Pentavision	
2011	DJMax Technika 3	Arcade	Pentavision	
2012	DJMax Ray	iOS, Android	Pentavision	
2012	DJMax Technika Tune	PS Vita	Pentavision	
2012	London 2012: The Official Video Game	iOS, Android	Neowiz Games	
2013	DJMax Technika Q	iOS, Android	Neowiz MUCA	
2017	DJMax Respect	PS4	Neowiz MUCA	
2018	Bless Online	Windows	Neowiz Bless Studio	
2020	DJMax Respect V	Windows, Xbox One, Xbox Series X|S	Neowiz MUCA	
2020	Bless Unleashed	Windows, Xbox One, PS4	Round8	
2020	Plebby Quest: The Crusades	Windows	PiedPipers Team	
2021	Dandy Ace	Windows, macOS, Xbox One, PS4, Switch	Mad Mimic	
2021	Skul: The Hero Slayer	Windows, macOS, Linux, Xbox One, PS4, Switch, iOS, Android	SouthPAW Games	
2021	Metal Unit	Windows, Switch	JellySnow Studio	
2021	8Doors: Arum's Afterlife Adventure	Windows, Switch	Rootless Studio	
2021	Cats & Soup	Android	Hidea	
2022	Alliance of Valiant Arms	Windows	Neowiz	
2022	Aka	Windows, Switch	Cosmo Gatto	
2022	Blade Assault	Windows	Team Suneat	
2022	Unsouled	Windows, Xbox One, Xbox Series X|S, Switch	Megusta Game	
2023	Lies of P	Windows, macOS, Xbox One, Xbox Series X|S, PS4, PS5	Round8	
2023	Brown Dust II	Windows, iOS, Android	GAMFS N	
2023	SANABI	Windows, Switch	Wonder Potion	
2025	Shape of Dreams	Windows	Lizard Smoothie	
2026	Kill The Shadow	Windows	Shadowlight	
TBA	Goodbye Seoul	Windows	JINO Games	
TBA	Untitled Lies of P sequel	TBA	Nough	
TBA	Untitled video game	TBA	WolfEye Studios	
TBA	Untitled video game	TBA	ZAKAZANE	
