= DJMax Mobile =

DJMax Mobile (Korean: 디제이맥스 모바일, dijeimaegseu mobail) is a version of the DJMax rhythm action game specifically developed for mobile phones. As of 2011, two separate titles exists of the game from separate developers who licensed the DJMax brand from the Pentavision. These mobile games were available only in Korea. DJMax Mobile has two different gameplay styles. First mode is similar to DJMax Portable series where you press physical buttons at a specific time. However, if your mobile phone has a touch-screen capability you can also play the game in year 2009 version using mode, which is similar to DJMax Technika where you do very specific touch gestures to control the game. DJMax Mobile games are not considered as a part of the main game series because they weren't developed by Pentavision and quality of these games is average even when compared to other similar mobile games. Both of these games are discontinued. The spiritual successor for the DJMax Mobile series is called Tap Sonic.

== DJMax Mobile 2005 ==
DJMAX Mobile
- Developer: Freezm
- Publisher: CJ Internet
- Platform: Mobile (WIPI)
- Release: June 15, 2005
- Genre: Music video game
- Mode: Single-player

The first DJMax Mobile game was developed by Freezm and it was released by CJ Internet (which is a part of the large Korean entertainment company CJ Entertainment) on June 15, 2005. This game service is not available anymore. It supported DJMax Portable-style single-player mode and non-stop mode. Users could compare their scores using ranking lists. It runs on Korean WIPI mobile phone middleware platform.

== DJMax Mobile 2009 ==
DJMAX Mobile
- Developer: Ntreev Soft
- Publisher: Gametree
- Platform: Mobile (WIPI)
- Release: December 24, 2009
- Genre: Music video game
- Mode: Single-player

The second DJMax Mobile game was developed by Ntreev and published by Gametree. It was released on December 24, 2009. It features selection of 68 songs from DJMax Portable, Portable 2, Clazziquai Edition, Black Square and Technika. The game supports DJMax Portable's 3B, 6B and 9B button modes, and if touch-screen is present also, DJMax Technika mode will be available. The game includes Mission, Survival and Freestyle gameplay modes. Songs are stored in a MIDI format which caused some controversy among the players. The difficulty of the game is on a low level (when compared to DJMax Portable games or DJMax Online) because mobile phones it was intended for did not have enough processing power for the game. The DJMax Mobile 2009 version was written using WIPI middleware platform so that it would run on a large number of devices. The size of the game is 2012 KB. On November 1, 2010 DJMax Mobile was discontinued service.

== Tap Sonic ==
Tap Sonic
- Developer: Neowiz Internet
- Publisher: Neowiz Internet
- Platforms: iOS, Android
- Release: KOR: July 1, 2011; JP: August 29, 2011; NA: September 14, 2011
- Genre: Music video game
- Mode: Single-player

Tap Sonic (Korean: 탭소닉) is a spin-off of the DJMax series by Neowiz Internet for mobile platforms such as iOS and Android in a partnership with Pentavision. It is a music game featuring various DJMax tracks, and is updated weekly with new content including licensed music from SM and YG Entertainment, amongst other music labels. Songs are played by spending Music Points that are purchased by players. Premium songs can be purchased in a one-off transaction.

== DJMax Ray ==
DJMAX Ray
- Developer: Pentavision Studio
- Publisher: Neowiz Internet
- Platforms: iOS, Android
- Release: September 28, 2012
- Genre: Music video game
- Mode: Single-player

The third DJMax Mobile game, DJMax Ray was developed by Pentavision Studio and published by Neowiz Internet. A teaser for this game was released on August 22, 2012 on the Tap Sonic YouTube channels. The game was released for Apple iOS and Android.

== DJMax Technika Q ==
DJMAX Technika Q
- Developer: Planet Team
- Publisher: Neowiz Internet
- Platforms: iOS, Android
- Release: October 13, 2013
- Genre: Music video game
- Mode: Single-player

The fourth DJMax Mobile game, DJMax Technika Q was developed by Planet Team, the reunion of earlier Pentavision team member and published by Neowiz Internet. A teaser for this game was released in September 2013. The game was released for Apple iOS and Android with Kakao Gaming platform.
