= List of DJMax soundtracks =

Pentavision has released DJMax soundtracks featuring songs from the games in a digital and physical retail format. This is a list of these albums.

== Digital audio soundtracks ==
These soundtracks are being sold or have been sold in Korean digital music stores. After Vocal Paradigm albums others have been released as well. These albums contain various songs from the game series. Some have specific themes like concentrating only to rock or electronic genre. Portable Legacy and Portable Retro are essentially DJMax Portable original soundtrack repackaged into two separate albums which contain songs from both "L" and "R" in-game discs of DJMax Portable.

=== DJMax Portable 2 Vocal Paradigm 1 ===
Vocal Paradigm

Compilation album by Pentavision
- Released: February 5, 2007
- Genre: K-Pop

Vocal Paradigm was the first album ever released outside influence of the games on February 5, 2007. It contains nine original songs from the DJMax Portable 2 which wasn't released at the time Vocal Paradigm came out.

No.	Title	Music	Length
1.	"Another DAY" (feat. Miya)	Forte Escape	4:09
2.	"Brandnew Days"	Planetboom	2:20
3.	"Syriana" (feat. JC)	Bexter	2:06
4.	"Bye Bye Love"	3rd Coast	2:01
5.	"SQUEEZE" (feat. YU-HI)	Oriental St8	2:17
6.	"Memoirs"	Miya	4:09
7.	"Hello Pinky"	NieN	2:10
8.	"Ladymade Star" (feat. Sanch)	ESTi	2:04
9.	"Right Now" (feat. Vocal Forge)	Makou	2:09
Total length:			23:25

=== DJMax Portable Legacy ===
DJMAX Portable Legacy

Compilation album by Pentavision
- Released: February 20, 2007
- Genre: K-Pop
- Producer: V.A.

No.	Title	Music	Length
1.	"바람에게 부탁해"	Forte Escape	1:48
2.	"Ray of Illuminati"	ESTi	2:11
3.	"Luv Flow"	3rd Coast	2:11
4.	"Elastic Star"	Forte Escape	1:50
5.	"JBG"	CROOVE	2:07
6.	"Save My Dream"	Forte Escape	1:52
7.	"End of the Moonlight"	Forte Escape	1:53
8.	"Jupiter Driving"	xxdbxx	2:01
9.	"Never Say"	ND Lee	4:00
10.	"복수혈전"	ND Lee	2:58
11.	"One the Love"	xxdbxx	3:21
12.	"Extream Z4"	Forte Escape	1:40
13.	"Fever Gj"	xxdbxx	2:07
14.	"Enemy Storm"	CROOVE	2:02
15.	"Out Law"	CROOVE	2:00
16.	"FTR"	Supbaby	2:28
17.	"Light House"	xxdbxx	1:58
18.	"Long Vacation"	ESTi	2:09
19.	"Catch Me"	Forte Escape	1:48
20.	"Bright Dream"	M2U	2:01
21.	"Temptation"	S-Tro	2:12
22.	"Road of Death"	NieN	2:30
23.	"Chrono Breakers"	NieN	2:16
24.	"Memory of Beach"	M2U	2:14
25.	"Lemonade"	M2U	2:22
26.	"Relation:again (ESTi’s Remix)"	Tsukasa & ESTi
27.	"Stars in Your Eyes"	Bermei.Inazawa
28.	"Phoenix Virus"	M2U
29.	"Yellowberry"	Forte Escape
30.	"Celestial Tears"	Tsukasa
31.	"Urban Night"	Electronic Boutique
32.	"바람에게 부탁해 (Live Mix)"	Forte Escape	3:52
33.	"Out Law (Funky Jam Live Mix)"	CROOVE	3:29
34.	"Elastic Star (UK Garage Mix)"	ESTi	1:52
35.	"바람에게 부탁해 (Startingly Version)"	Forte Escape

=== DJMax Portable Retro ===
DJMAX Portable Retro

Compilation album by Pentavision
- Released: March 8, 2007
- Genre: K-Pop
- Producer: V.A.

No.	Title	Music	Length
1.	"Sunny Side (Remastered)"	Croove	3:06
2.	"Can We Talk"	Forte Escape	2:05
3.	"Futurism"	Forte Escape	1:55
4.	"Funky Chups"	Forte Escape	1:31
5.	"Oblivion"	ESTi	2:02
6.	"A.I."	Forte Escape	2:25
7.	"Masai"	Croove	2:03
8.	"Let’s Go Baby"	3rd Coast	2:06
9.	"Ya! Party!"	Forte Escape	1:39
10.	"On"	ND Lee	3:44
11.	"Kuda"	GonZo	1:45
12.	"Rock or Die"	NieN	1:45
13.	"Fear"	Supbaby	2:02
14.	"Astro Fight"	Forte Escape	1:53
15.	"아침형 인간"	ND Lee	3:51
16.	"Eternal Memory ~소녀의 꿈~"	M2U	3:25
17.	"Red"	Croove	2:06
18.	"Sin"	ESTi	1:58
19.	"Para-Q"	Forte Escape	1:34
20.	"Nb Ranger"	M2U	1:57
21.	"피아노 협주곡 1번"	WavFactory	2:01
22.	"Dreadnought"	EarBreaker	2:19
23.	"Minimal Life"	EarBreaker	2:31
24.	"Triple Zoe"	Forte Escape	2:13
25.	"Hamsin"	makou	2:24
26.	"Sunny Side (Deep’n Soul Mix)"	makou	4:29
27.	"Oblivion (Rockin’ Night Style)"	NieN	2:02
28.	"Sin The Last Scene"	ESTi	1:56
29.	"Space of Soul"	M2U
30.	"Vanish Lady"	Electronic Boutique
31.	"Damascus"	makou
32.	"Cnp"	Croove
33.	"Too Fast"	Forte Escape
34.	"Super Lovely"	EarBreaker
35.	"Blythe"	M2U
36.	"Yo! Max!"	ND Lee	5:25

=== DJMax Portable 2 Vocal Paradigm 2 ===
Vocal Paradigm 2

Compilation album by Pentavision
- Released: March 22, 2007
- Genre: K-Pop

Vocal Paradigm 2 is the second album released outside the game series. It was made available on March 22, 2007 and it contains nine songs from the DJMax Portable 2. It was released eight days before DJMax Portable 2 which was released March 30, 2007.

No.	Title	Music	Length
1.	"Your Own MIRACLE"	Ruby Tuesday	03:07
2.	"A Lie"	makou	02:16
3.	"설레임"	ND Lee	02:05
4.	"Get Out"	ND Lee	03:17
5.	"Stay With Me"	Ruby Tuesday	01:57
6.	"Feel"	DJ Mocha	02:09
7.	"Stalker"	ND Lee	02:17
8.	"Good Bye"	Ruby Tuesday	02:09
9.	"Showtime"	Ruby Tuesday	03:00

=== DJMax ROCK Tunes ===
DJMAX ROCK Tunes

Compilation album by Pentavision
- Released: October 15, 2010
- Genre: K-Pop, Rock
- Producer: V.A.

DJMax ROCK Tunes is Korea only music album which features rock songs from DJMax game series. It is one of the five albums released in conjunction to celebrate release of DJMax Portable 3.

No.	Title	Music	Length
1.	"Raise Me Up"	Planetboom	4:25
2.	"Break!"	Mr.Funky	1:55
3.	"Love Is Beautiful"	Electronic Boutique	2:12
4.	"Leave Me Alone"	NieN	2:02
5.	"Become Myself"	PIA	3:49
6.	"If"	Vanilla Unity	4:45
7.	"The Guilty"	P'sycho Remi	1:39
8.	"Keys To The World"	Planetboom	3:36
9.	"Burn It Down"	P'sycho Remi	1:49
10.	"Raise Me Up" (Acoustic Mix)	Miya	4:11

=== DJMax ANIPOP Tunes ===
DJMAX ANIPOP Tunes

Compilation album by Pentavision
- Released: October 15, 2010
- Genre: K-Pop, J-Pop
- Producer: V.A.

DJMax ANIPOP Tunes is one of the five albums released in conjunction to celebrate release of DJMax Portable 3. Anipop Tunes collects Japanese pop stylish songs from DJMax games to one record.

No.	Title	Music	Length
1.	"Say It From Your Heart"	makou	2:50
2.	"Cosmic Fantastic Lovesong"	Diny	1:50
3.	"Eternal Fantasy" (Miya Vocal Ver.)	XeoN	4:02
4.	"Puzzler"	Electronic Boutique	1:34
5.	"Sweet Dream"	Lin-G	1:51
6.	"Trip"	NieN	3:22
7.	"Put Em Up"	makou	1:24
8.	"Cozy Quilt"	Bermei.inazawa	1:40
9.	"Eternal Fantasy"	XeoN	1:44
10.	"Mellow D Fantasy"	NieN	2:14
11.	"Season" (Warm Mix)	makou	2:00
Total length:			24:31

=== DJMax ELECTRONIC Tunes ===
DJMax ELECTRONIC Tunes

Compilation album by Pentavision
- Released: October 15, 2010
- Genre: K-Pop, Techno, House, Trance
- Producer: V.A.

DJMax ELECTRONIC Tunes is one of the five albums released in conjunction to celebrate release of DJMax Portable 3. It features songs from the various electronic subgenres such as Melodic Trance and Electro house.

No.	Title	Music	Length
1.	"Funky People"	Vespers & Myagi	1:59
2.	"Beautiful Girl" (Seth Vogt Electro Vanity Remix)	DJ Keri	1:50
3.	"Everything" (Mr.Funky Disco Re-mix)	미스터 펑키	4:11
4.	"Drum Town"	Myagi	1:59
5.	"Hanz Up!"	미스터 펑키	1:53
6.	"The Rain Maker"	Paul Bazooka	2:00
7.	"Bee-u-tiful"	First Aid	4:28
8.	"Luv Is True"	3rd Coast	2:53
9.	"Dream Of Winds"	XeoN	4:01
10.	"Beyond The Future"	7 Sequence	1:42
11.	"Everything"	3rd Coast	3:52
Total length:			30:48

=== DJMax EXCLUSIVE Remixes ===
DJMAX EXCLUSIVE Remixes

Compilation album by Pentavision
- Released: October 15, 2010
- Genre: K-Pop, Techno, House
- Producer: V.A.

DJMax EXCLUSIVE Remixes is one of the five albums released in conjunction to celebrate release of DJMax Portable 3.

No.	Title	Music	Length
1.	"Nb Ranger: Nonstop Remix"	Paul Bazooka	3:39
2.	"Masai (Electro House Mix)"	Paul Bazooka	2:07
3.	"Zet (Mr.Funky Remix)"	미스터 펑키	1:58
4.	"Out Law – Reborn"	미스터 펑키	1:59
5.	"Enemy Storm (Dark Jungle Mix)"	Paul Bazooka	2:00
6.	"Desperado (Nu skool Mix)"	Paul Bazooka	2:04
7.	"Luv Flow (Funky House Mix)"	Paul Bazooka	2:06
8.	"Get Out (Hip Noodle Mix)"	DJ Eon, ND Lee	3:18
9.	"Syriana (Blast Wave Mix)"	DJ Eon, Bexter	3:47
10.	"Supersonic (Mr.Funky Remix)"	미스터 펑키	3:33
11.	"Nova (Mr.Funky Remix)"	미스터 펑키	2:05
12.	"DJMax Exclusive Mixtape"	미스터 펑키	9:54
Total length:			38:30

=== DJMax MANIAC Tunes ===
DJMAX MANIAC Tunes

Compilation album by Pentavision
- Released: October 15, 2010
- Genre: K-Pop
- Producer: V.A.

DJMax MANIAC Tunes is one of the five albums released in conjunction to celebrate release of DJMax Portable 3.

No.	Title	Music	Length
1.	"La Campanella: Nu Rave"	Cranky	1:50
2.	"D2"	First Aid	1:53
3.	"Dual Strikers (Rock Planet Mix)"	Planetboom	2:41
4.	"Thor"	XeoN	3:23
5.	"Monoxide"	Planetboom	2:20
6.	"Xlasher"	Shinji Hosoe	3:15
7.	"Gone Astray"	makou	1:58
8.	"Rage of Demon"	NieN	1:55
9.	"Airwave"	ReX	1:45
10.	"Dual Strikers"	7 Sequence	1:51
Total length:			22:51

== Physical Audio Soundtracks ==
These soundtracks have only come bundled with the collector's editions of their respective games unless noted. Exceptionally every DJMax Trilogy package comes with the soundtrack included.

- 2006 - DJMAX PORTABLE Original Sound Tracks
- 2007 - DJMAX PORTABLE 2 Audio Trinity
- 2008 - DJMAX TECHNIKA: Original Soundtrack
- 2008 - DJMAX Portable BLACK SQUARE Original Soundtrack
- 2008 - DJMAX Trilogy OST
- 2010 - DJMAX TECHNIKA 2 Original Soundtrack
- 2010 - DJMAX Portable Hot Tunes Golden OST + Piano Collection
- 2011 - DJMAX Portable 3 Original Sound Track
- 2011 - DJMAX TECHNIKA 3 ORIGINAL SOUNDTRACK
- 2012 - DJMAX TECHNIKA TUNE Original Sound Track
- 2017 - DJMAX RESPECT Original Sound Track
- 2020 - DJMAX RESPECT V Original Sound Track
