= Vanilla Unity =

South Korean rock band

- Origin: Seoul, South Korea
- Genres: Emo Rock; Indie rock
- Years active: 2004–present
- Labels: Gom Entertainment
- Members: Lee Seungju; Kim Younghoon; Lee Jeonghak; Kim Minseon; Jo Seongjoon

Vanilla Unity (Hangul: 바닐라 유니티) is a South Korean rock band. Formed in 2004, the band consists of Lee Seungju on vocals, Kim Younghoon on guitar, Lee Jeonghak on guitar, Kim Minseon on bass guitar, and Jo Seongjoon on drum.

In 2004, the same year they formed, the band won third prize at the K-rock Championship and received a special award for best new band. In 2005, they signed to the rock label Gom Entertainment. In January 2006, they released their debut album, Love.

Their song, "IF", is featured on the Music game DJMax Portable 3 and DJMax Technika 3 by the South Korean company, Pentavision. They also have a song called "Tomorrow" that was featured in the soundtrack of the kdrama Princess Hours (or Goong).

== Members ==
Name		Position
Romanized	Hangul	Position
Lee Sung Joo (Mr. Joo)	이승주	Vocals
Jimmy Jang	장지미	Guitarist
Damon Joe		Guitarist
Nicholas Yohan Duvernay (Nick)		Bassist
Kim Min Seong (Mind)	김민성	Drummer
Former Members
Lee Jeong Hak	이정학	Guitarist
Kim Young Hoon	김영훈	Guitarist
Kim Min Seon	김민선	Bassist
Jo Seong Joon	조성준	Drums

== Events ==
- Sapiens 4th Anniversary Concert

== Discography ==
=== Albums ===
- Love – (2006)
- Farewell & Tonight – (2007)
- Commonplace – (2008)
- We Are Rising – (2011)
