= Technika =

Technika, meaning technology in several Slavic languages, may refer to:

- Technika (brand), a brand of electronic products from Tesco
- Technika (publisher), a publishing house of Vilnius Gediminas Technical University
- Technika (camera), an all-metal folding field camera from Linhof
- TECHNIKA, an annual technical festival held at the Birla Institute of Technology

It may also refer to:

- DJ Max Technika, is an arcade music game published and developed by Pentavision
- DJ Max Technika 2, the sequel to DJ Max Technika
- DJ Max Technika 3, the sequel to DJ Max Technika 2
