= DJMax Technika Tune =

2012 video game

- North American cover art
- Developers: Pentavision, Neowiz Mobile
- Publishers: KOR: Pentavision; NA: Pentavision Global; JP: CyberFront
- Producer: Planetboom
- Designer: XeoN
- Platform: PlayStation Vita
- Release: KOR: 20 September 2012; HKG: 20 September 2012; JP: 27 September 2012; NA: 4 December 2012
- Genre: Music video game
- Modes: Single-player, Multiplayer

DJMax Technika Tune is a music game for the PlayStation Vita published and developed by Pentavision Studio in South Korea, and is an adaptation of the earlier DJMax Technika arcade game series. It is the 16th title in the DJMax series.

== Gameplay ==
In-game screenshot demonstrating the touchscreen interface of the rhythm game

The PlayStation Vita version features a new play style to the arcade version, utilising both the front touchscreen and rear touchpad, as well as the return of OST and M/V modes. The port is announced to have more songs than any of the earlier DJMax Portable games. The US version of the game will contain 67 individual music tracks.

=== Game Modes ===
DJMax Technika Tune introduces 4 modes for single player. The gameplay utilises a 3-note track.

Star Mixing is a beginner mode identical to the Lite Mixing mode in the original arcade version of DJMax Technika (prior to the large note patch). The game allows the player to play using the touchscreen, and the long, repeat, and chain notes do not appear in this mode. The charts in Freestyle mode are called STAR charts.

Pop Mixing is an intermediate mode identical to the Popular Mixing mode in the original arcade game. The game allows the player to play using only the touchscreen, or both the touchscreen and the rear pad; this setting can be adjusted in the options. All types of notes appear in this mode. The charts in Freestyle mode are called POP charts.

Club Mixing is an advanced mode identical to the Club Mixing mode in the DJMax Technika 2 and DJMax Technika 3 arcade games. Once the player clears all three songs of choice, a Boss Stage track will be available to play in the same manner as the arcade games. Along the game, the player is able to deplete the Groove Meter for up to one bar, and depleting the Groove Meter below the point allowed for any stage will result in a stage failure. The charts in Freestyle mode are called CLUB charts.

Freestyle Mixing is a free mode similar to the Freestyle modes in earlier games within the DJMax Portable series and DJMax Trilogy. The songs unlocked in Star Mixing/Pop Mixing/Club Mixing will appear in this mode.

== Development and release ==
DJMax Technika Tune was developed by Pentavision. It is a port of the arcade video game DJMax Technika. The developer focused on fine-tuning the touchscreen controls and reaction rate. A feature involving the camera of the PlayStation Vita was considered but abandoned to keep DJMax Technika Tune as a rhythm game.

On September 8, 2011, Pentavision announced that DJMax Technika would be adapted to the PlayStation Vita. The working title of the upcoming game was reported as DJMax Technika Vita. On April 13, 2012 the final official title was revealed to be DJMax Technika Tune, along with its release date within South Korea. On April 24, 2012, it was announced that the game would be released in North America during Q2/Q3 of 2012, alongside a new promotional trailer for the game.

== Reception ==
Reception

Aggregate scores
Aggregator	Score
GameRankings	83.33%
Metacritic	81/100

Review scores
Publication	Score
Destructoid	8/10
Electronic Gaming Monthly	8.5/10
Famitsu	28/40
Joystiq	4/5
Pocket Gamer UK	8/10

Kotaku describes Technika Tune as on par with Gravity Rush and LittleBigPlanet as one of the top performing titles on the PlayStation Vita, albeit having a relatively difficult learning curve.

Joystiq gave Technika Tune an overall rating of 4 out of 5, complimenting the game's visuals and music library. Electronic Gaming Monthly gave the game a score of 8.5, citing that although the fever mechanism is rather difficult to activate, the game overall has quality audio and video along with enjoyable gameplay.

Technika Tune was also nominated for PS Vita PSN Game of the Year 2012 on the US PlayStation Game of the Year Awards.

== See also ==
- DJMax Technika
- DJMax Portable
