= DJMax Portable Hot Tunes =

2010 video game

DJMAX Portable Hot Tunes
- Developer(s): Pentavision
- Publisher(s): Pentavision
- Designer(s): ponGlow
- Series: DJ Max
- Platform(s): PlayStation Portable
- Release: KOR: June 11, 2010
- Genre(s): Music video game
- Mode(s): Single-player Multiplayer

DJMax Portable: Hot Tunes (Korean: 디제이맥스 포터블 핫튠즈; Japanese: DJマックス ホットチューンズ) is an action-rhythm video game for the PlayStation Portable published and developed by Pentavision. It is a compilation of the DJMax Portable and DJMax Portable 2 games. The game is intended to be beginner-friendly and Pentavision stated that players who have never played the DJMax series would find it easy to play. It also has been specifically designed for a Japanese audience and precautions have been taken in avoiding translation errors. It is the second DJMax game to be formally released in Japan. Hot Tunes is the sixth installment of the DJMax series for the PlayStation Portable platform. Currently only a UMD distribution for the game is available. A total of 2000 limited edition sets was made available. Each package included a wooden case, calendar, original soundtrack and piano collection, and eight mini-posters.

== Features ==
The main menu UI was based on DJMax Portable and other features were derived from Portable 2. The game uses the opening from DJMax Portable, Ask to Wind Live Mix. The game introduced '4B Lite', an easier 4B (4-button) mode for beginners which can be compared to 2B (2-button) mode in DJMax Portable Clazziquai Edition. Alongside 4B Lite, the game includes traditional 4B, 6B, and 8B modes. The Link Disc and Album sections are both absent. The Auto-Correction feature (in which any button can be used to hit a note), introduced in Black Square and used in Fever and Trilogy, has been removed. The green 'Specialized Note' introduced in DJMax Portable Black Square and DJ Max Fever, giving bonus points when hit and stops the background music when missed, has been removed as well.

== Glitches ==
Inside MV Edition mode, there are two music videos labeled "Sunset Rider". One of them is actually the music video for "Sunny Side".

== See also ==
- DJMax - DJMax series.
- DJ Max Fever - A similar compilation version marketed towards North America.
