= DJMax Portable 3 =

2010 video game

DJMAX Portable 3
- DJMax Portable 3 North American cover art
- Developer: Pentavision
- Publishers: KOR: Pentavision; NA: PM Studios; JP: CyberFront
- Directors: Bexter; Planetboom (Sound Director)
- Producer: Croove
- Series: DJ Max
- Platform: PlayStation Portable
- Release: KOR: 14 October 2010; NA: 14 October 2010; PSN: 19 October 2010; JP: 17 February 2011
- Genre: Music video game
- Mode: Single-player Multiplayer

DJMax Portable 3 (Korean: 디제이맥스 포터블 3; abbr.: DMP3) is a music game for the PlayStation Portable published and developed by Pentavision in South Korea, and is a sequel to the earlier DJMax Portable games. DJMax Portable 3 was announced shortly after DJMax Technika 2 was announced. The official trailers from PM Studios and Pentavision quickly followed. It is the seventh installment of the game for the PlayStation Portable, and is regarded as the actual sequel to DJMax Portable 2 since Clazziquai and Black Square branched out for the METRO Project in 2008, Fever for the North American release and the Technika series globally.

== New Features ==
- Removal of autocorrect (where a single button can be bashed to complete a song) and removal of the green specialist note (which, if missed, muted the song until another specialist note was hit).
- The button modes have been renamed to XT where X refers to the number of buttons (ex: 4B is now 4T)
- A new game mode, known as "REMIX SYSTEM", involves using the analog stick and pressing the square, triangle, and circle buttons. This new mode comes in the name of X.2T, where X is the button mode. The "gear" has been enlarged.
- Network, Link Disc, Album (OST only, not MV edition), 5B, 8B, 4BFX, and 6BFX have been removed.
- Two notes introduced along with the REMIX SYSTEM: Turntable Notes are purple long notes that are played by moving the analog stick, and are based on DJ scratch and cross-fading; Sampler Notes resemble synthesizer notes or sound effects, and are played using the Square, Triangle and Circle keys when the analog stick is shifted to the left or right.
- 5 button modes – 4T, 6T (both referred to as classic modes), 3.2T, 4.2T, 6.2T.
- High-def graphics and MVs in-game
- Along with a preview sound clip of the song on the song select screen, part of the song's MV will play in the background as well.
- A new difficulty system for the new remixing modes. Instead of Normal, Hard, and Maximum like in classic modes, the remixing modes use a Turntable Set (TS), Sampler Set (SS), and Workstation Set (WS). The Sampler Set adds Sampler Notes with Turntable Notes, while the Workstation Set has parts with Sampler Notes without turntable notes.
- New system for leveling up. Every time the player levels up, they get a choice of 3 boxes. Each one contains a prize such as wallpaper, a song M/V, a character, a note, or a gear. The prizes are randomly selected. When the player picks one, all three boxes reveal what prizes they had, and the player obtains the prize that was in the box they selected. As the player levels up, the amount of potential prizes increase. For example, all the hidden songs become level up box prizes once the player reaches a certain level. When the player reaches level 99, all the prizes they did not pick are automatically unlocked.
- Mission Mode returns. Two types of missions exist. The first one is normal missions, where the player is presented with up to three songs (depending on the mission, some missions only play one or two songs), and the button mode for each song, similar to the mission modes of other games in the series. The player must fulfill the requirements of the mission during the songs to complete the mission. Completion gives out the reward displayed on the mission's icon. There are 70 normal missions. The second group of missions are known as DJ Challenges, and they resemble Achievements or Trophies from the PS3 and Xbox 360 systems respectively. They can usually be completed regardless of skill (ex: Challenge #28 is completed by failing a song 5 times). The game notifies the player when they have completed a DJ Challenge. The player then goes to the DJ Challenges list and confirms a challenge is completed and obtains the prize on its icon (which has an exclamation point on it, marking the challenge as complete). There are 30 DJ Challenges.
- A new area called Lounge. This is essentially Collection mode from the previous games, merged with MV Edition mode from Portable 2. The first screen contains the players DJ name, DJ Icon (which can be changed by pressing Triangle, but the player's options are limited to what characters they unlocked), total song count, DJ Rank (which is increased by completing missions, DJ Challenges, and song patterns), and two percentage bars. The first bar shows the percentage of missions cleared (100 in total, both Missions and DJ Challenges) and the second shows the percentage of song patterns cleared. Lounge Mode is also where players can view Play Data (records of the songs and patterns that have been cleared for each button mode), Videos (where one can see unlocked song M/Vs and miscellaneous videos), Internet Ranking (containing passwords for use with the online rankings), and Image Gallery (unlocked images that can be saved on the memory stick to be used as the PSP's wallpaper. There are a total of 80 images, two for each song. The first for each is unlocked by simply completing the song on any button mode once, the second for each is unlocked by either a random level-up reward, or a Mission/DJ Challenge reward).

== Announcement ==
PM Studios officially announced on 25 May 2010 that the game would be released in North America, and that they were aiming for a North American release within October 2010. The game will be released in both UMD and PlayStation Network Digital Download format. It is to feature more than 30 songs, various modes and options, and an unannounced new feature (which was later confirmed as the X.2T modes). There will be two different limited editions (one for the US and the other one for Korea) which includes various extras like artbooks and the original soundtrack to the game. Both of them are strictly limited to 1000 pieces. The single UMD would be limited to 6000 discs in the US. The limited edition for the US version were sold exclusively on Bemanistyle.

== Songs ==
Playable Music

- Beautiful Girl
- Become Myself
- Break
- Cosmic Fantastic Lovesong
- Desperado (N skook Mix)
- Dream of Winds
- Drum Town
- Enemy Storm (Dark Jungle Mix)
- Everything
- Funky People
- Get Out (Hip Noodle Mix)
- Gone Astray
- Hanz Up!
- IF
- Keys to the World
- La Campanella: Nu Rave
- Leave me Alone
- Love is Beautiful
- Luv Flow (Funky House Mix)
- Luv is True
- MASAI (Electro House Mix)
- Mellow D Fantasy
- NB Ranger: Nonstop Remix
- Outlaw: Reborn
- Put Em Up
- Rage of Demon
- The Rainmaker
- Raise Me Up
- Say it From Your Heart
- Season (Warm Mix)
- Sunny Side (remixed)
- Supersonic (Mr. Funky Remix)
- Sweet Dream
- Syriana (Blast Wave Mix)
- Trip
- Waiting for the Sun
- Whiteblue
- Xlasher
- Your Smile
- Zet (Mr. Funky Remix)

Background Music

- Flash Fingers (Opening Song)
- A Significant Change (Teaser)
- Diceplay (Mode Select)
- Still Alive (Result)
- Superwave (Total Result)
- moTivation (Mission)
- Gateway (Lounge)
- Midnight Express (Ending)
- Armageddon (by The Wideband Network, the ending credits song when arcade is cleared with combined accuracy of 97% or higher, not on the OST)

Cameoed Music

In Remix Mode, samples from other songs were played. Here is the list of sampled music from other titles of the DJMax series.

- Beat U Down (in Xlasher)
- BRAINSTORM (in Enemy Storm (Dark Jungle Remix))
- Cherokee (in ZET (Mr.Funky Remix))
- Colours of Sorrow (in La Campanella: Nu Rave)
- Cypher Gate (in Syriana (Blast Wave Mix) and Whiteblue)
- Get on top (in Super Sonic (Mr.Funky Remix) and Syriana (Blast Wave Mix))
- GET OUT (in Sunny Side (Remix))
- Honeymoon (in Love is Beautiful)
- I want you (in Sweet Dream)
- Ladymade Star (in Cosmic Fantastic Lovesong)
- Landscape (in Dream of Winds)
- Lovely Hands (in Raise me up)
- MASAI (in MASAI (Electro House Mix))
- NB Girls (in Break!)
- OUTLAW (in Desperado (Nu Skool Mix) and OUT LAW – Reborn)
- Secret World (in Sunny Side (Remix))
- SON OF SUN (in Rage of Demon)
- Starfish (in Keys to the world)
- Supersonic (in Enemy Storm (Dark Jungle Remix) and Keys to the World)
- Taekwonburi (in NB Ranger Nonstop Remix)
- The Last Dance (Eng ver.) (in Put Em Up)
- Y (in Say it from your heart)

== Development and release ==
DJMax Portable 3 was developed by Pentavision. It was produced by Ryu Hwiman. The developer wanted to attempt a new gameplay style to differentiate itself with the previous DJMax Portable games. The new gameplay includes the Remix Mode.

DJMax Portable 3 was released in South Korea on 14 October 2010.

== Reception ==
Greg Miller of IGN ranked DJ Max Portable 3 a 7 out of 10 stating: "I never found myself drawn to come back to DJ Max Portable 3; the stuff it bumbles makes the gameplay seem less cool. The long loads, the super-familiar setup and the awkward nature of the options and menus just didn't work for me this time around."
