= DJMax Trilogy =

2008 rhythm video game

- Developer(s): Pentavision
- Publisher(s): Neowiz Games
- Designer(s): Forte Escape
- Series: DJMax
- Platform(s): Microsoft Windows
- Release: December 24, 2008
- Genre(s): Music
- Mode(s): Single-player, multiplayer

DJMax Trilogy (Korean: 디제이맥스 트릴로지; abbreviation: DM TR) is a rhythm action game with five difficulty modes ranging from limited four-key gameplay to a challenging eight-key setup. As notes are played with perfect accuracy, a "fever gauge" will be charged. When it is fully charged, Fever can be activated. Fever acts as a multiplier to score and it varies between x2 and x5.

This game also requires a highly secured USB profile key, which is included in the packaging, to run the game. The USB stick is used to decrypt the encrypted game content while the game is running. The entire player's profile is also saved to the USB key. A DJMax Trilogy profile consists of several things like the player's high scores, progress and settings. Because of this, it is almost impossible to run DJMax Trilogy without the USB profile key.

The English translation of DJMax Trilogy has inconsistencies in naming and many mistranslated or misspelled words. For example, in some of the Mission descriptions (in Mission mode), words like "Achieve" have been misspelled as "Achive".

== Features ==
- Songs from previous DJMax games: DJMax Trilogy includes most of the songs from all previous DJMax games, along with Trilogy-exclusive songs like "Memory of Wind" and "Streetlight", for a combined total of 130 songs.
- Updates to the game include some newer songs from DJMax Clazziquai Edition, DJMax Technika, and DJMax Portable Black Square.
- The BGAs are compatible with wide-screen displays.
- Almost all BGAs are in the animation motion style of DJMax Portable and DJMax Portable 2 and are completely different from DJMax Technika, DJMax Portable Clazziquai Edition, and DJMax Portable Black Square (the BGA for Stop in Trilogy uses a BGA with characters from the Starfish BGA instead of a boy attacking robots like in Technika and Black Square).
- Massive amount of content: 1000 note patterns, 900 unlockables, various missions, 120+ songs from previous installations along with new additions.
- Network Play: Play online with players from around the world.
- Active Live Sound option allows crowd, comments and reverb voice during game play.
- Special Saving method: To play this game, you have to insert a USB profile key, which prevents copying of software and also keeps the player profiles.

== Release ==
Pentavision started to take pre-order on December 13, 2008, and revealed demo songs for the game as a promotion. Peripheral manufacturer GameMac released an official turntable controller for the game.
