= Lies of P =

2023 video game

- Developers: Neowiz; Nough (Note: Nough (a portmanteau of "not enough", rebranded itself in August 2026.)
- Publisher: Neowiz
- Director: Choi Ji-won
- Programmers: Park Kwang-suk; Bae Chang-sik
- Artists: Noh Chang-kyu; Cha Byung-jun
- Writers: David Noonan; Cory Herndon
- Composers: Oh Jung-hoo; Lee Dong-hoon; Park Dong-sub; Kim Ki-beom
- Engine: Unreal Engine 4
- Platforms: macOS; Windows; Xbox One; Xbox Series X/S; PlayStation 4; PlayStation 5; Nintendo Switch 2
- Release: macOS, Windows, Xbox One, Xbox Series X/S; September 18, 2023; PlayStation 4, PlayStation 5; September 19, 2023; Nintendo Switch 2; August 6, 2026
- Genre: Action role-playing
- Mode: Single-player

Lies of P (Note: Korean: P의 거짓; RR: P-ui geojit) is a 2023 action role-playing game developed by Neowiz and Nough (formerly Round8 Studio) and published by Neowiz. The story is loosely based on the 1883 Italian novel The Adventures of Pinocchio by Carlo Collodi, to whom it is dedicated. The game is a Soulslike set in the fictional city of Krat, inspired by the Belle Époque. The titular "P" refers to protagonist Pinocchio, whom the player controls from a third-person perspective, and is one of the automaton-like "Puppets" central to life and industry in Krat.

As P, whose freedom of will bypasses Krat's laws of robotics, the player must use melee weapons, a mechanical arm, and "Ergo" energy (serving as both XP and currency) to navigate the enemy-infested city, which is plagued by a "Frenzy" turning other Puppets deadly, using a luxurious hotel as their base of operations. Binary choices by the player affect the outcomes of sub-plots as well as the overall narrative.

Lies of P was released for macOS, PlayStation 4, PlayStation 5, Windows, Xbox One, and Xbox Series X/S in September 2023. It received favourable reviews, with praise directed at its combat, visuals, sound design, and vocal cast, though opinions on its level design and narrative were mixed. By June 2025, the game had sold over 3 million units and was nominated for several year-end accolades, including The Game Awards and the Golden Joystick Awards, appearing on numerous lists of the top video games of 2023.

A prequel expansion, Overture, was released in June 2025. A Nintendo Switch 2 version was released on August 6, 2026. A sequel is in development.

== Gameplay ==
Lies of P is an action role-playing game played from a third-person perspective. The player controls a silent puppet referred to as P, who traverses the fictional city of Krat and fights hostile puppets, factions, and citizens disfigured by the petrification disease. At the game's start, the player chooses one of three combat styles, which determines the character's attributes and initial weapons. The player uses melee weapons and Legion Arms equipped with tools that include a grappling hook. Every weapon, except for boss weapons, consists of a blade and a handle that can be upgraded and combined with other similar components. Upon combining, the weapon gains a unique ability called Fable Arts, activated when the corresponding bar is filled up. Weapon durability decreases during combat and can be increased by grindstones, which also give weapons temporary power-ups. The player can perform light and heavy attacks, as well as parry or block enemy attacks. Parrying inflicts a staggering effect on the enemy and damages their weapon. Blocking causes P to lose a small amount of health, which is partially restored after a successful counterattack.

The player acquires and upgrades weapons at Hotel Krat, which also provides access to other activities as the game progresses. Items are purchased with in-game currency called Ergo, also used to level up P by distributing it among vitality, vigor, and other attributes. The game features a skill tree that gradually unlocks with Quartz obtained after either buying it from a shop or defeating bosses and minibosses. Skills have additional slots for passive bonuses. After reaching a certain point in the story, the player can use Wishstones that grant temporary power-ups, such as increased damage and health regeneration to either P or a spectre. The player can also equip Defense Parts that increase P's defense capabilities. Before a boss fight, which usually has two phases, the player can summon a spectre to provide support. When the boss is defeated, the player receives a Rare Ergo crystal that can be exchanged for boss weapons or amulets with bonuses.

Exploring Krat, the player encounters ringing phones that pose riddles. Correct answers reward the player with Trinity Keys, which unlock locations containing gear and resources. The player can also find Cryptic Vessels, hidden locations with chests that offer various rewards, as well as collectables. Checkpoints called Stargazers are located throughout Krat and can be used to restore P's health and resources. Stargazers also serve as fast travel and respawn points. Upon respawn, P loses Ergo, which is retrievable at the place of death. However, each time P takes damage on the way back, the amount of recoverable Ergo decreases.

Lies of P features a morality system that presents the player with limited-time options: tell the truth or lie. These decisions influence the plot's development, including the ending. The player engages in conversations with non-player characters (NPCs) through a dialogue tree, uncovering additional information about the game world. Certain NPCs offer side quests that reward the player with items like new weapons and resources. P's appearance is customizable with outfits and masks found throughout the game. After completing the main story campaign, New Game Plus becomes available, allowing for replay with gear and upgrades acquired from the previous playthrough. The Overture expansion added new content, including enemies, weapons, side quests, and accessibility options, among other features.

== Synopsis ==
Much of Lies of P's story is given to the player through optional dialogue and flavor text from items; when and if players learn of specific story elements can depend on their progress, although this section summarizes the story in a more linear fashion.

=== Premise ===
Lies of P takes place in the fictional city of Krat, made prosperous by "Ergo", a resource which the Order of Alchemists used to power autonomous Puppets designed by Giuseppe Geppetto. Puppets bound by the "Covenant" to never harm humans nor lie were integrated into many aspects of life, allowing Krat to thrive. Later, a mysterious illness known as the "Petrification Disease" swept through the city, slowly blinding people before killing them. As Krat failed to contain the crisis, a sudden phenomenon, the "Puppet Frenzy" turned most Puppets murderous in spite of the Covenant, causing a massacre of the population. It is during this state of chaos that the game begins, following a puppet called "P" who Geppetto considers his son and who, unlike other Puppets, looks exactly like a Human; untouched by the Frenzy, P has free will, unbound by the Covenant and is as free to lie or kill as a Human would be.

=== Plot ===
P awakens in an abandoned train at the Krat Central Station and hears the voice of a woman named Sophia, who directs him to Hotel Krat, a safe building he subsequently uses as his base of operations as he navigates Krat, rescuing innocents whom he brings back to its safety, fighting hostile Puppets who attack him on sight, and encountering various members of the "Stalkers", the Human armed forces of Krat whose allegiances and goals largely differ from individual to individual. He is guided by Sophia, who can communicate with him remotely, and a puppet named Gemini inside a lamp carried by P.

P rescues Geppetto, and later the inventor Lorenzini Venigni, (Note: Venigni's equivalent in the novel if Mangiafuoco, whose three puppets also appear in Lies of P: Pulcinella is Venigni's dedicated stewart, Arlecchino is a recurring character with strong ties to Venigni, and Rosaura appears in Overture.) leader of Krat's mechanical industry, before reaching the cathedral to which refugees fled from the Frenzy. However, most Humans in the area are either dead or have become "Carcasses", the Disease somehow mutating them into murderous abominations instead of killing them. He later explores the Malum District, but although he encounters two friendly Stalkers, Red Fox and Black Cat, he must fight the four members of the Black Rabbit Brotherhood gang, killing the eldest and finding evidence that they collaborate with the Alchemists. (Note: The four members of the Black Rabbit Brotherhood, who carry with them a coffin, represent the four Undertaker rabbits in the novel who come to take Pinocchio to the Underworld.) P travels to Krat's opera house, as Geppetto claims that the rumored "King of Puppets" who made it their lair must be responsible for the Frenzy. The King's true appearance, like P's, is strikingly similar to a Human's. The King tries to communicate, but as P cannot understand, the two fight to the death in a duel from which P emerges as victor. He later meets Simon Manus, the leader of the Alchemists, who reveals that exposure to Ergo causes the Disease, and that the mutations are a side-effect of concoctions the Alchemists offered to the afflicted as a cure, and which, although causing most to turn into Carcasses, turn a small percentage of subjects into a super race that the Alchemists consider the next stage of Human evolution. Before leaving, Simon also explains that Ergo is the crystallized form of the human soul that forms after death. During P's further travels, Hotel Krat is attacked by the Brotherhood, the Red Fox and the Black Cat, who abduct Geppetto under the Alchemists' orders.

Key optional plot points include: The discovery that Geppetto is behind the Frenzy, having added a secret directive into the Covenant allowing him nearly-unlimited control of most Puppets; "Sentient" Puppets whose "Ego" awakened, making them able to bypass the Covenants' restrictions, and who can be nearly-identical "revived Puppet" versions of the dead Humans who turned into the Ergo powering them; That P is the revived Puppet of Carlo, Geppetto's son, while the King of Puppets was the revived Puppet of Romeo, Carlo's best friend; That up until his death, the King had been trying to avoid further death and warn P of Geppetto's deception; That the man posing as the rightful treasure hunter Alidoro is an impostor who killed the original and was complicit in the attack on the hotel; (Note: The fake Alidoro can optionally reveal his former identity is be that of the Stalker "Parrot", echoing a parrot in the novel who is similarly connected to the Fox and Cat. The real Alidoro's book counterpart is the mastiff of the same name who saves Pinocchio from The Green Fisherman; if Parrot is killed, a third character, Rookie Explorer Hugo, takes on the Alidoro costume and monicker, while the original Alidoro appears in Overture.) And that the "King of Riddles" who has been contacting P by phone is Arlecchino, one of the first Sentient Puppets who went on a long-hidden killing spree where he murdered the parents of Venigni, who would design the Covenant to avoid similar incidents.

P kills the rest of the Brotherhood, and uses a submarine made by Lorenzini to reach the Isle of the Alchemists where Geppetto is held. On the shore, he encounters Sophia, who confesses to having only appeared thus far as a projection, with her real body, disfigured by Ergo, lying atop the Isle, and used by the Alchemists to control Ergo and spread the Petrification Disease. (Note: Sophia is a "Listener", a unique kind of individuals who can manipulate Ergo. It is implied that she also had the ability to manipulate time, something she used to revert P's repeated deaths and "resurrect" P him every time the player died.) Sophia requests that P ends her suffering, and while fighting his way up the Isle, he faces the choice of either leaving her alive or mercy killing her. Later, he encounters Red Fox and Black Cat, who depending on the player's actions either let him pass or fight him to the death. (Note: The Fox and Cat echo their book counterparts, similarly involving deceiving Pinocchio, the cat's blindness, and a golden tree. In the book, the Fox and the Cat also abandon Pinocchio at the Red Lobster Inn, just like their Lies of P counterparts abandon P in Malum shortly after going through an inn by the same name.) Eventually, P frees Geppetto, who tells him that Simon has gathered enough Ergo to activate a powerful relic called the Arm of God and achieve divine power. P climbs to the top of the tower and kills the mutated Simon.

Beneath the Alchemists' tower, P finds Geppetto, who asks P gives him his mechanical heart to put into a "Nameless Puppet", leading to one of two endings:

- If P agrees, he dies, and Geppetto uses his heart to revive the Nameless Puppet, whom Geppetto designed as the true revived Carlo. (Note: Prior to the Puppet Frenzy, Geppetto discovered that puppets could develop human-like qualities. He planned to use the Arm of God to revive Carlo and modified Carlo's body and heart, enabling the latter to absorb Ergo. To gather the necessary amount of Ergo, Geppetto temporarily implanted Carlo's heart into P, who was not bound by the Covenant.) On Geppetto's orders, the new Carlo slaughters the survivors in Hotel Krat, and Geppetto, having replaced them with puppet copies, leaves the hotel to "rebuild" the city for Carlo.
- If P refuses, Geppetto activates the Nameless Puppet to take his heart by force. Eventually, the Nameless Puppet, who has seemingly become sentient and wishes to avoid having their heart replaced with Carlo's, attempts to stab the heart of a defenseless P; Geppetto rushes in between the two, sacrificing himself to shield Carlo's heart, after which P destroys the puppet. Back in Hotel Krat, the survivors prepare for a Krat past its recent crisis.
  - Depending on previous choices throughout the game, Geppetto's dying words differ. If most choices befit a Puppet, Geppetto bitterly labels P "Just a Puppet", but if the player mercy killed Sophia and made enough "Human"-like choices, P will, impossibly, cry as he holds his father, leading Geppetto to acknowledge that he is truly his son; in the latter case, an exclusive additional scene follows Geppetto's death, in which P uses Sophia's Ergo to create a revived Puppet of her, for which she is thankful.

A post-credits scene reveals Giangio, a guest at Hotel Krat who posed as a meek, desperate former Alchemist, but is in truth a crafty deceiver named Philippus Paracelsus, currently on his way out of Krat in a phone conversation with a woman which hints that the two played a key role in triggering recent events in Krat. Paracelsus labels P "a new brother" and sentient Puppets "a new type of humanity", while the woman points out that eternal life can take many forms. Finally, Paracelsus vows his intentions to eventually return to Krat to find "Dorothy", someone he labels "another key". Back in Krat, someone walks on a rooftop before clicking the heels of their shoes thrice. (Note: In the Pinocchio novel, Giangio is a farmer who buys Romeo as a donkey and whom Pinocchio briefly works for. Philippus Paracelsus' name is that of a real-life alchemist; it is also part of the real name of Button-Bright, a character in the Oz book series, which the post-credit scene alludes to.)

=== Overture ===
During his journey through Krat, P comes across an unusual Stargazer that transports him to past version of Krat, during the last winter prior to the events of the main game. He finds himself in Krat Zoo before it was destroyed in the chaos of the Puppet Frenzy, where the animals were subjected by the Alchemists to their concoction, turning into Carcasses slaughtering the guests and staff. P kills the Elevated Alchemist Markiona, and later unearths a conspiracy of corruption leading him to kill the leaders of both of the Stalkers' subgroups: Lumacchio, the corrupt leader of the Bastards who effectively acted as Simon's headhunter, and Veronique, the selfless leader of the Sweepers, whom Simon led into a trap, leading her group to be experimented on by the Alchemists and become incurably tainted by the concoction.

P's path leads him to follow in the recent trail of Lea Florence Monad, the "Legendary Stalker" who mysteriously disappeared before the events of the main game, and is both Sophia's sister and Carlo and Romeo's mentor. While Carlo is already dead in this recent past, Lea is currently looking for Romeo, still a living Human, and who has gone missing investigating the Zoo. She finds that Romeo was abducted by Arlecchino, the serial killer sentient Puppet whose previous murder spree she had ended, but who was recovered by the Alchemists and rebuilt more powerful before going rogue, slaughtering any in his path and taking Romeo hostage in an effort to bait Lea into seeking him. Secretly, Lea is dying, infected with the Disease and hanging on by will alone, refusing to let Romeo die as the loss of Carlo still haunts her.

Eventually, P catches up with Lea and join forces with her to explore the Rose Estate, the childhood home of Lea, Carlo and Romeo, where Arlecchino waits, having slaughtered all within. (Note: After Carlo's mother died, a grief-stricken Geppetto completely removed himself from his son's life, leading Carlo to be raised in big part in the Rose Estate, which was an orphanage, together with Romeo, who had no living parent. Lea and Sophia's parents were the founders of the orphanage, making it their childhood home as well.) Eventually, they defeat Arlecchino and rescue the badly wounded but alive Romeo. Lea happily recognizes P as Carlo as he is sent back to his present, after which Geppetto arrives, preparing to kill the exhausted, helpless Lea and Romeo so that he can experiment by turning the latter into a Sentient Puppet, although Lea is at peace, knowing that Carlo lives on.

== Development and release ==
Lies of P was developed by Neowiz and Round8 Studio led by Choi Ji-won. Round8 Studio, known for the free-to-play MMORPG Bless Unleashed (2020), was founded in South Korea as a mobile game developer, but sought to pursue larger projects. Together with Neowiz, known for developing games as a service, the companies saw Lies of P as an opportunity to diversify both their own portfolios and the South Korean video game industry in general, which is mostly focused on mobile games with microtransactions. Development began around 2020. Within two years, the team expanded from 60 to 100 people.

The narrative was inspired by Carlo Collodi's 1883 novel, The Adventures of Pinocchio, which is in the public domain. Choi stated that the studio chose a story with this status to allow for creative expression within the soulsborne subgenre. Having an established story foundation early in development allowed the team to focus on their own interpretation and execution. The game was also influenced by the Belle Époque, a period in European history at the turn of the 19th and 20th centuries marked by progress in science and technology. The developers considered this period unique due to its lack of representation in other games. Choi noted that during the prototyping phase, the team experimented with various European architectural styles, but the Belle Époque caught their attention with its combination of "romance, turmoil, cultural resurgence, and prosperity." These elements reflected the studio's intention to depict the transformation of Krat, the setting of Lies of P, from prosperity to decline. Choi added that the design was generally inspired by the developers' travels throughout Europe.

The studio sought to create a dark and eerie atmosphere in the game, using the dynamic change of weather and time of day in particular. Choi stated that achieving this goal without compromising gameplay and performance was one of the most challenging tasks in the development process. The team considered introducing an open world and multiplayer features, but ultimately decided against both. The decision to add Soulslike elements was due to both fashion trends and the developers' personal passion for the genre. The team sought to combine elements from other Soulslike titles with their own mechanics. The game was developed using Unreal Engine 4. Marvelous Designer was used to create fabric textures for characters and backgrounds. Although the game originally featured the Denuvo anti-tamper system, the developers removed it a few months after the game's release.

The game was announced in May 2021 with a debut trailer. In June 2023, a demonstration was released as part of the Summer Game Fest. That same month, a special edition with cosmetics and a collector's edition with physical and digital items such as an artbook and soundtrack were announced. Pre-orders launched simultaneously, offering cosmetics and, in the case of the special edition, granting early access to the game several days before its official release. Development of Lies of P ceased by August as the game was submitted for manufacturing. It was released on September 18 for macOS, Windows, Xbox One, and Xbox Series X/S. The PlayStation 4 and PlayStation 5 versions were released on September 19. In November, the soundtrack was released separately on streaming platforms such as Spotify as well as on Steam. In February 2024, the developers released an update with new weapons and outfits as part of the crossover with Wo Long: Fallen Dynasty (2023). An official artbook, The Art of Lies of P, was released in November 2024 through Dark Horse Comics. In June 2025, a prequel expansion Overture was released.

== Reception ==
=== Critical response ===
Reception

Aggregate scores
| Aggregator | Score |
|---|---|
| Metacritic | PS5: 80/100 (Note: Based on 68 scored reviews of 71 total reviews); Win: 83/100 (Note: Based on 40 scored reviews of 41 total reviews); XSXS: 85/100 (Note: Based on 25 scored reviews of 26 total reviews) |
| OpenCritic | 88% recommend (Note: Based on 157 reviews) |

Review scores
| Publication | Score |
|---|---|
| Digital Trends | 3.5/5 |
| Eurogamer | 3/5 |
| Famitsu | 8/10, 9/10, 9/10, 8/10 |
| Game Informer | 9.5/10 |
| GameSpot | 8/10 |
| GamesRadar+ | 4/5 |
| IGN | 8/10 |
| PC Gamer (US) | 74/100 |
| PCGamesN | 7/10 |
| Push Square | 8/10 |
| Shacknews | 8/10 |
| The Guardian | 4/5 |
| VG247 | 2/5 |
| VideoGamer.com | 8/10 |

Lies of P received "generally favorable" reviews from critics, according to review aggregator Metacritic, and 88% of critics recommended the game, according to OpenCritic. It was praised for its visuals and sound design, performance, and implementation of Soulslike elements, though critics were divided on its narrative and gameplay. Liam Croft of Push Square praised Lies of P as a "first-rate experience," applauding its presentation and production values. George Yang of Digital Trends considered it "one of the most impressive" Soulslike games released at the time, while Richard Wakeling of GameSpot highlighted its originality and aesthetic compared to other games in the genre. Some critics drew comparisons between aspects of Lies of P and FromSoftware titles like Bloodborne (2015), with Wakeling suggesting that these similarities could make the game seem "overly derivative." Sherif Saed of VG247 argued that Lies of P's overall design was a "pale imitation" of FromSoftware games and deemed it one of 2023's biggest disappointments.

GamesRadar+'s Jasmine Gould-Wilson praised the narrative, particularly its interpretation of Carlo Collodi's original story, calling its elements "thoughtful and confluent." Travis Northup of IGN noted that "of all the distressing and enigmatic stories I've seen in [the Soulslike genre, Lies of P] is definitely among my favorites." Diego Nicolás Argüello of Polygon lauded P's character development, and Lincoln Carpenter of PC Gamer highlighted the dialogue. Conversely, TJ Denzer of Shacknews wrote that P lacks a clear personality. Finlay Cattanach of VideoGamer praised the atmosphere and immersive setting. While he found the narrative to be its weakest aspect, he acknowledged it was engaging enough to keep him interested. GameSpot's Wakeling wrote that despite some intriguing plot points, the story felt vague and disappointing until the third act.

Lauren Bergin of PCGamesN found the balance between game mechanics "genuinely impressive," while Push Square's Croft lauded both the combat system and skill tree. Denzer of Shacknews particularly enjoyed the weapon combination system. William Hughes of The A.V. Club appreciated the morality system and boss battles, though he noted a certain monotony in some of the encounters. PC Gamer's Carpenter lauded P's customizable appearance, and Kieran Harris of Gamereactor praised the level design. Conversely, Eurogamer's Caelyn Ellis called the level design a "theme park facade" and the game's weakest element. VG247's Saed felt the combat system was a "wasted potential" and relied too heavily on elements from other Soulslike games. Additionally, he described the morality system as "perfunctory." Rob Dwiar of TechRadar found the difficulty level to be inconsistent, while Digital Trends' Yang criticized the implementation of boss battles.

VideoGamer's Cattanach lauded the art design, particularly the characters. Wesley LeBlanc of Game Informer commended the boss design, deeming it "highly memorable," a sentiment echoed by Yang of Digital Trends who wrote that this aspect "[gave] each battle its own distinct personality." Ed Thorn of Rock Paper Shotgun praised the fluidity of P's combat animations, noting how they "flow into one another beautifully." He also praised the game's performance, particularly on Steam Deck, highlighting the smooth gameplay and visual quality despite the low graphics settings. Conversely, VG247's Saed criticized some of the animations, calling them "infuriating." GamesRadar+'s Gould-Wilson criticized the reuse of assets in different locations, believing that it detracted from the immersiveness. Northup of IGN and Georgina Young of Sports Illustrated both mentioned encountering minor visual glitches. Northup praised the soundtrack, stating that it "truly stands out" among other Soulslike games and highlighting some of the songs as "just fantastic."

==== Overture ====
Overture reception

Aggregate scores
| Aggregator | Score |
|---|---|
| Metacritic | PS5: 84/100 (Note: Based on 8 scored reviews of 10 total reviews); Win: 85/100 (Note: Based on 23 reviews) |
| OpenCritic | 100% recommend (Note: Based on 45 reviews) |

Review scores
| Publication | Score |
|---|---|
| Game Informer | 9/10 |
| GameSpot | 8/10 |
| IGN | 8/10 |
| TechRadar | 4.5/5 |

The Overture expansion received "generally favorable" reviews from critics, according to Metacritic, and 100% of critics recommended the expansion, according to OpenCritic. Richard Wakeling of GameSpot lauded Overture for its "terrific job of building tension and creating a terrifying sense of unease," while Wesley LeBlanc of Game Informer wrote that he was surprised "by just how strong" the expansion was. Wakeling praised the story as "compelling throughout," but criticized the main villain as an "over-the-top cartoon" antagonist. IGN's Travis Northup praised the expansion for its effective reintroduction of the setting, despite its reliance on existing lore. He found the narrative "every bit as satisfying as the original," noting its "heartbreaking and bleak" tone and describing certain segments as "the most epic (and sometimes stomach-churning) moments I've seen in a game in a long time."

Reviewers hailed the expansion's bosses, with IGN's Northup considering them Overture's standout feature and better balanced than those in the base game. Rhys Wood of TechRadar called the boss fights some of the best in the game and the Soulslike genre as a whole. Critics welcomed gameplay additions such as new enemies, weapons, and difficulties. (Note: Attributed to multiple references:) At the same time, Northup expressed disappointment with the encounters preceding the bosses and the combat system, and felt the expansion "plays it fairly safe" regarding new mechanics. Wakeling of GameSpot largely complimented the level design, deeming its quality on par with the base game, though he noted that some levels "lack[ed] the character." Wakeling and Wood praised the art design, with Wakeling calling some scenes "morbidly beautiful in a way."

=== Sales ===
Following its release, Lies of P was the sixth-best-selling game on the Steam digital store. In the United Kingdom, it was the third-best-selling game in physical sales chart in its opening weekend. In September 2023, the game was the ninth-most-downloaded PlayStation 5 game in both North America and Europe. In October, it dropped to fifteenth and nineteenth in these regions, respectively. Within that same month, Lies of P sales reached 1 million units. In March 2024, the developers stated that the game had accumulated 7 million players. Total sales were announced to be over 3 million in June 2025. As of March 2026, Lies of P has sold over 4 million units worldwide.

=== Accolades ===
Prior to its release, Lies of P earned several awards at Gamescom. Following its release, the game received nominations for its visuals at both the Golden Joystick Awards and The Game Awards, the latter also recognizing it in the Best Role Playing Game category. Furthermore, its visuals garnered an honorable mention at the Game Developers Choice Awards. Lies of P appeared on numerous lists of the top video games of 2023, (Note: Attributed to multiple references:) being ranked in sixth place by The Washington Post and ninth place by Vulture.

| Award | Date | Category | Result | Ref. |
|---|---|---|---|---|
| Apple Design Awards | June 6, 2024 | Visuals & Graphics | Won | |
| British Academy Games Awards | April 17, 2026 | Performer in a Supporting Role (Alix Wilton Regan in Overture) | Nominated | |
| The Game Awards | December 7, 2023 | Best Art Direction | Nominated | |
| The Game Awards | December 7, 2023 | Best Role Playing Game | Nominated | |
| Game Developers Choice Awards | March 20, 2024 | Best Visual Art | Honorable mention | |
| Gamescom Awards | August 29, 2022 | Best Action Adventure Game | Won | |
| Gamescom Awards | August 29, 2022 | Best Role Playing Game | Won | |
| Gamescom Awards | August 29, 2022 | Most Wanted Sony PlayStation Game | Won | |
| Golden Joystick Awards | November 20, 2023 | Best Visual Design | Nominated | |
| Golden Joystick Awards | November 20, 2025 | Best Game Expansion (Overture) | Won | |
| The Steam Awards | January 2, 2024 | Outstanding Story-Rich Game | Nominated | |
| Ultra Game Awards | January 20, 2026 | DLC of the Year (Overture) | Won | |

== Sequel ==
In November 2023, Neowiz announced that a sequel was in development. It is expected to feature Dorothy as the main character, a character from the Oz novels by L. Frank Baum.
