= DJMax Ray =

2012 video game

- The title screen of DJMax Ray
- Developer: Pentavision
- Publisher: Neowiz Internet
- Director: AstroKid
- Producers: Xeronion; Planetboom
- Designers: Nam, Joong-hoon
- Engine: Unity
- Platforms: iOS, Android
- Release: September 28, 2012 (iOS); March 4, 2013 (Android, Korean); April 9, 2013 (Android, Global)
- Genre: Music
- Mode: Single-player Multiplayer

DJMax Ray is a music mobile game developed by Pentavision Studio and published by Neowiz Internet in South Korea, and is an adaptation of the earlier DJMax titles Tap Sonic and DJMax Portable.

== Development ==
The development of DJMax Ray was announced by This is Game during August 2012. The announcement explained that Neowiz Mobile and Pentavision had developed a mobile application codenamed DJMax Mobile 2012 and it would be published to the two leading mobile operating systems, Apple iOS and Android. The first teaser of this game was released on the official Tap Sonic YouTube account. The teaser explained that the game would be released on Apple iOS devices and would include a new song from NieN and ND Lee. On September 3, 2012, Neowiz Internet explained that the game would only be released on iOS devices and would not be released for Android.

On September 24, 2012, Neowiz Mobile released the DJMax Mobile 2012 gameplay movie and revealed the final title to be DJMax Ray.

On March 4, 2013, Neowiz Mobile released the DJMax Ray for Android with music packs from the iOS version and added a new exclusive music pack. The game went global on March 11, 2013. Some Android 2.3 devices can install it.

== Gameplay ==
The gameplay is the same playing style as with Tap Sonic from Neowiz Internet but with new features. The gameplay features the same play style as Tap Sonic but has the key sound mixing system (where keys control specific sounds) and Fever mode as seen in other DJMax games such as the Portable series.

Players can select the style and the chart difficulty on the music settings screen. After that, the player taps spaces in the touch zone to complete the song. During the gameplay, players will gradually fill up the Fever bar with each successfully hit note. When the Fever bar fills up, players can activate fever mode to temporarily increase the rate at which the player gains points and combos. Fever is different from how it worked in DJMax Trilogy, instead being more similar to the DJMax Portable series. The Fever will activate for a short time, and players can fill the Fever bar during an existing Fever to activate fever mode again. In this way, the fever mode can incrementally increase to provide 8x the score and combos than without having Fever on. An option to have Fever activate automatically also exists. When the fever mode is over the score multiplier will disappear but the Fever bar can still be filled to start again.

== See also ==
- Tap Sonic
- DJMax Portable
