= WIPI =

WIPI may refer to:

- World Intellectual Property Indicators, an annual statistical report published by the World Intellectual Property Organization
- WIPI (platform), Wireless Internet Platform for Interoperability, a middleware platform used in South Korea
- Wipi language, a Papuan language of New Guinea
- WIPI protein family, an evolutionarily conserved family of proteins
