= DJMax =

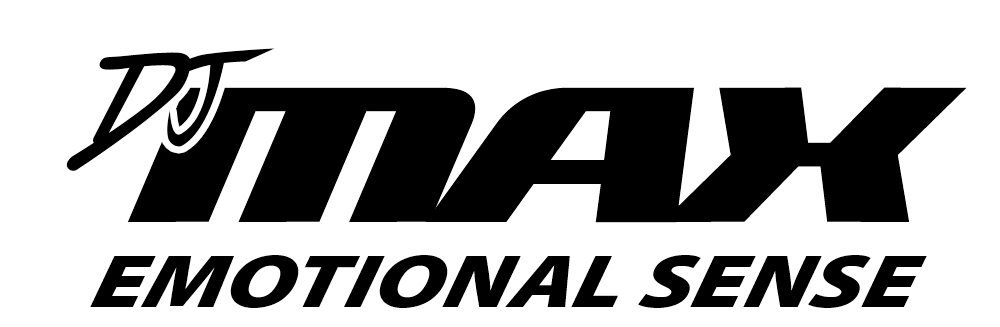
- Logo of the DJMax franchise
- Genre: Rhythm game
- Developer: Neowiz MUCA
- Publishers: CJ E&M (2004–2006); Neowiz (2006–present)
- First release: DJMax Online; June 13, 2004
- Latest release: DJMax Respect V (Xbox port); July 7, 2022
- Spin-offs: Tap Sonic

DJMax (Korean: 디제이맥스, dijeimaegseu) is an action-rhythm video game series created by Neowiz MUCA. Games feature mostly experimental music and visual art from Korean DJs, artists and composers. Known South Korean experimental group Clazziquai Project has also made songs for the series. There are also a few Japanese composers who have given significant contributions to the series.

== Release history ==
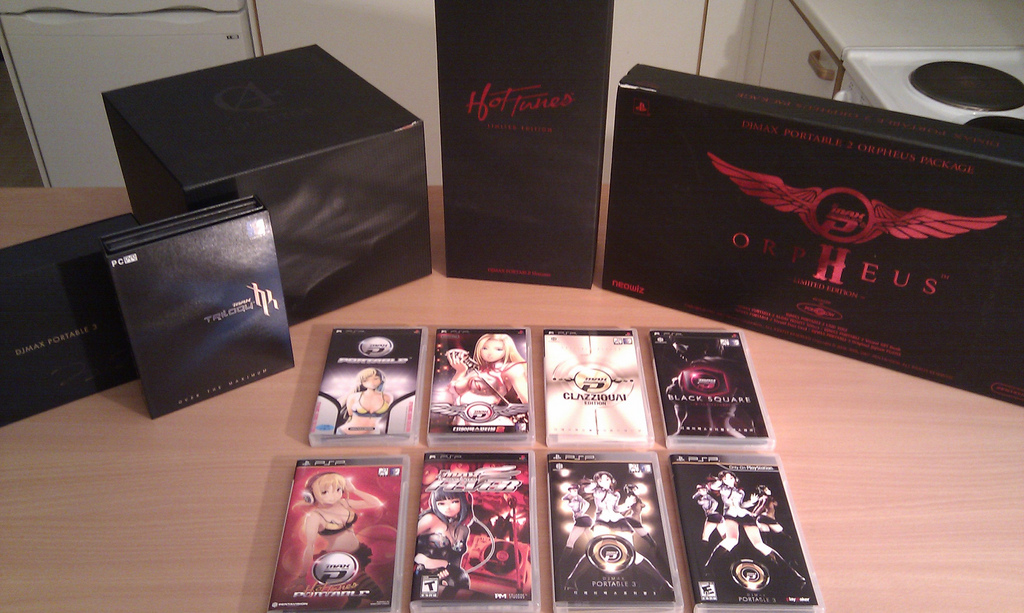
The DJMax series of games

The first game in the series, DJMax Online, started on June 13, 2004 (closed alpha test) as a web based service for the Windows platform. It was only accessible from Korea, Japan and China. Since then, Pentavision has developed and published seven DJMax games mostly for the PlayStation Portable under the title DJMax Portable.

Pentavision released an offline DJMax game for Windows under the title DJMax Trilogy on December 25, 2008. Trilogy is a compilation of songs from three earlier games (DJMax Online, DJMax Portable and DJMax Portable 2) and it was created to replace DJMax Online, which was taken offline on March 21, 2008. Pentavision worked together with Korean company Gammac to manufacture a special DJ controller for the game which was then bundled together with the limited edition. The controller became widely available outside the Limited Edition a few months later.

Pentavision announced an arcade music game named DJMax Technika on December 31, 2008. It features a new way of playing via a bottom 22-inch touch screen. It was followed by DJMax Technika 2, which was released on March 4, 2010. DJMax Technika 3 was released in Korea on October 27, 2011.

United States-based developer PM Studios officially announced on May 25, 2010 that DJMax Portable 3 would be released in North America. It was officially released October 14, 2010 on UMD and on October 19, 2010 on PlayStation Network.

Tap Sonic is a spin-off of the DJMax series for the iOS and Android mobile platforms by Neowiz Internet in partnership with Pentavision.

DJMax Technika Tune was announced on March 13, 2012 for release on the PlayStation Vita. It was released in 2012 in Korea, Japan and the USA. It features similar touch-based gameplay as in the Technika arcade series.

== Rules and basic gameplay ==
Demonstration of the typical gameplay style and interface of titles within the DJMax series

=== DJMax Portable and DJMax Trilogy ===
The main gameplay is formed around the idea that the player must press various buttons at the correct moment. This is indicated by the music and the notes which scroll down in a tune of the music track visualized on screen. Hitting the correct notes fills in the missing instrument sounds from the melody and gives player points. The objective of the game is to hit all notes with 100% accuracy, gaining full Combo and activating DJ Fever as many times as possible during the song to maximize Combo points which are used to maximize points from the song.

The player receives percentage per note which informs them how close they were from hitting the note exactly at the right moment. It ranges from 1–100% and the player receives points from the notes according to their accuracy. The gameplay also opens new game modes, songs, styles, additional content like music videos or backgrounds for player as player progresses and gains experience points and levels.

If the player keeps hitting the notes at correct timing, the player also receives Combo points that fill the DJ Fever Gauge. Combo points are an additional multiplier used to get maximum score from the song. Fever boost is used to maximize Combo points. If the player misses even one note during a Combo, this counter is reduced to zero and counting begins again from the first correct note. It is possible for the player to gain additional Combo points by activating DJ Fever. It speeds up the game and makes it harder to hit the correct notes but it also allows player to reach much higher Combo values.

There are various types of difficulty settings in DJMax, and specifics differ from game to game. Usually there is at least Arcade, Mission and Freestyle game modes available. During Arcade and Freestyle, the player has the option of choosing which button layout to follow. Button layouts scale from just two buttons up to a maximum of eight buttons. Which button layouts are available for the player depends on game release.

Button layouts offer first selection of difficulty level for the player. 4B being the easy mode and 8B commonly being the hardest mode by virtue of having more physical buttons that need to be hit. Every song in the series has a rating which indicates the difficulty of the song based on number of notes the player must hit correctly in that song. Some songs are only available in higher difficulty formats which is the second tier of difficulty selection. These are marked usually with HD (Hard), MX (Maximum) or SC (Super Crazy) as opposed to the usual NM (Normal).

==== Arcade mode ====
In Arcade mode, the player has to pass four stages with increasing difficulty rating. Stages consist usually of a randomized selection of songs available in each release. When the player passes the stage, the player receives a grade ranging from F to A+ in most games. When the player has passed all the stages, scores from the stages are combined and presented to the player with statistics about the player's success. After passing the Arcade mode, the player usually sees a small "Thanks for playing DJMax" video clip. The objective of this mode is to get the highest score. In some games the players can compete against others by submitting their scores to an online ranking system.

==== Freestyle mode ====
Freestyle is a mode where any unlocked song can be played individually. Additionally, the combo counter is persistent throughout all song plays meaning the player can get a near 'infinite" combo. Limit is determined by each game release.

==== Mission mode ====
Mission game mode, which is also known as XC (Extreme Challenge) mode in some DJMax games, features curated songs with certain challenges. These are explained in a mission briefing when selecting a mission. These challenges can range from achieving a certain number of points, a certain score multiplier, a certain accuracy, not breaking the combo more than what is allowed, or achieving a certain combo.

Often challenges can be combined within missions. For example, in DJMax Portable 2 there is a challenge called "Rock n' Night", which states that player has to use DJ Fever at least once, two times in a row, on every pre-selected stage of the mission and that player also has to exceed combo of 2000 notes. If the player is able to pass the mission, then the game rewards player with additional items like new characters and new gear & note styles.

==== REMIX SYSTEM mode ====
The DJMax Portable 3 introduced a game mode known as REMIX SYSTEM. It features game modes 3.2T, 4.2T and 6.2T which add two additional tracks for players to follow. The player uses the PSP's analog stick to move active track to be either left or right, default position being center. These additional tracks only feature three lines so player only has to press the square, triangle and circle buttons while moving the analog stick correspondingly to hit the notes. The trick is that player has to follow the active track and changes can come fast. Variation of this mode is featured in most songs from DJMax Respect where the remix lanes are implemented within the main lanes.

=== DJMax Technika ===
In this arcade series (which also has one entry for the PlayStation Vita and mobile platforms), players have to tap the screen at the moment when a moving slider crosses the symbols. Tapping the correct symbols produce sounds which fills in the missing sounds from the song and gives players points. There are different kinds of hand gestures or motions player needs to perform at times.

== Intellectual property disputes ==
On December 12, 2008, Pentavision attempted to file a patent for a rhythm game system similar to a game system patented by Konami under Korean Patent No. 294603, which outlines game systems such at hitsounding, visual indicators of accuracy, and the results screen following the song. Pentavision's patent cited Konami's patent as a basis, but differs as Pentavision's patent allows players to control note location, keybindings, and hit effects. Less than two weeks later, Pentavision received a patent infringement filing from Konami on December 24, 2008, where Konami claimed that the DJMax series infringed on their patent. The lawsuit was settled out of court, with Pentavision being required to pay a fee for all prior DJMax games, alongside Konami owning exclusive distribution rights to the DJMax Technika franchise in Japan.

== Released games ==
| Title | Release date | Platform | Ref. |
|---|---|---|---|
| DJMax Online | June 13, 2004 | Windows | |
| DJMax Portable | January 14, 2006 | PSP | |
| DJMax Portable International Version | October 27, 2006 | PSP | |
| DJMax Portable 2 | March 30, 2007 | PSP | |
| DJMax Portable Clazziquai Edition | October 20, 2008 | PSP | |
| DJMax Portable Black Square | December 24, 2008 | PSP | |
| DJMax Technika | December 31, 2008 | Arcade | |
| DJMax Trilogy | December 25, 2008 | Windows | |
| DJ Max Fever | January 27, 2009 | PSP | |
| DJMax Technika 2 | June 16, 2010 | Arcade | |
| DJMax Portable Hot Tunes | June 12, 2010 | PSP | |
| DJMax Portable 3 | October 14, 2010 | PSP | |
| DJMax Mobile (2005) | June 15, 2005 | Mobile | |
| DJMax Mobile (2009) | December 24, 2009 | Mobile | |
| Tap Sonic | July 1, 2011 | iOS, Android | |
| DJMax Technika 3 | October 27, 2011 | Arcade | |
| DJMax Technika Tune | September 20, 2012 | PlayStation Vita | |
| DJMax Ray | September 28, 2012 | iOS, Android | |
| DJMax Technika Q | October 13, 2013 | iOS, Android | |
| DJMax Respect | July 28, 2017 | PlayStation 4 | |
| DJMax Respect V | March 12, 2020 | Windows, Xbox One, Xbox Series X/S | |
