= Neowiz MUCA =

South Korean recording studio

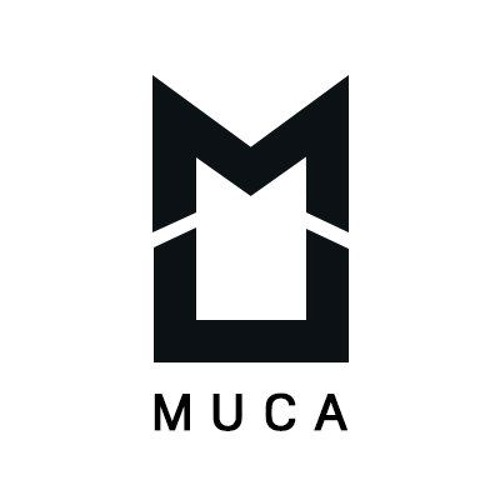
Official NEOWIZ MUCA Logo

Neowiz MUCA or Neowiz Music Cafe (formerly known as Pentavision and Pentavision Studio) is a South Korean recording studio and video game developer. The team are developers for the DJMax series and TapSonic series. They also developed the online multiplayer game S4 League. It is a division of Neowiz.

== Team members ==
Neowiz MUCA Team

- Mycin.T
- Bexter
- XeoN
- ned
- 7 Sequence
- GOTH

External Artists

- NieN
- ND Lee
- Paul Bazooka
- Nauts
- Sampling Masters MEGA
- bermei.inazawa
- zts
- Lee Zu
- Makou
- FUNTWO
- Cuve

== Games developed ==
=== as Pentavision ===
Title	Release date	Platform	Released regions
DJMax Online	June 13, 2004	Windows	South Korea, Japan & China
DJMAX Mobile (2005)	June 15, 2005	Mobile	South Korea
DJMax Portable	January 14, 2006	PSP	South Korea
DJMax Portable International Version	October 27, 2006	PSP	South Korea
DJMax Portable 2	March 30, 2007	PSP	South Korea
DJMax Portable Clazziquai Edition	October 20, 2008	PSP	South Korea
DJMax Portable Black Square	December 24, 2008	PSP	South Korea & Japan
DJMax Technika	December 31, 2008	Arcade	International
DJMax Trilogy	December 25, 2008	Windows	South Korea
DJ Max Fever	January 27, 2009	PSP	North America
DJMAX Mobile (2009)	December 24, 2009	Mobile	South Korea
DJMax Technika 2	June 16, 2010	Arcade	International
DJMAX Portable Hot Tunes	June 12, 2010	PSP	South Korea
DJMAX Portable 3	October 14, 2010	PSP	South Korea, North America & Japan
Tap Sonic	July 1, 2011	iOS, Android	South Korea & Japan
TapSonic Classic	September 14, 2011	iOS, Android	International (except South Korea)
DJMAX Technika 3	October 27, 2011	Arcade	International
DJMAX Technika Tune	September 20, 2012	PlayStation Vita	International
DJMAX Ray	September 28, 2012	iOS, Android	International

=== as Neowiz MUCA ===
Title	Release date	Platform	Released regions
DJMax Technika Q	June 21, 2017	iOS, Android	International
DJMax Respect	July 28, 2017	PlayStation 4	International
TapSonic TOP	September 2017	iOS, Android	International (except Taiwan)
TapSonic World Champion	November 6, 2017	iOS, Android	International
TapSonic BOLD	March 26, 2019	Microsoft Windows	International
DJMax Respect V	March 12, 2020	Microsoft Windows, Xbox One, Xbox Series X/S	International
