= Skul: The Hero Slayer =

2021 video game

- Developer: SouthPAW Games
- Publisher: Neowiz
- Platforms: Microsoft Windows; macOS; Linux; Nintendo Switch; PlayStation 4; Xbox One; Android; iOS
- Release: Linux, macOS, Microsoft Windows; January 21, 2021; PlayStation 4, Nintendo Switch, Xbox One; October 21, 2021; Android, iOS; June 4, 2024
- Genres: Roguelike, action-platformer
- Mode: Single-player

Skul: The Hero Slayer is a roguelike action-platformer developed by SouthPAW Games and published by Neowiz. The game was released on January 21, 2021 for Microsoft Windows, macOS, and Linux, and launched on October 21, 2021 for Xbox One, Nintendo Switch, PlayStation 4. A version for Android and iOS was released on June 4, 2024. Players control skeleton Skul as he attempts to save demonkind from their enemies, the heroes. The player can swap Skul's head for different skulls, granting combat abilities across randomly-generated levels. The game received positive reviews on release.

== Gameplay ==
Skul: The Hero Slayer is a 2D side-scrolling action platformer with roguelike elements. The player controls a skeleton named Skul, who serves as a soldier in the Demon King's army. The player must traverse randomly-generated levels to save the denizens of the Demon King's castle who were captured by the heroes. Skul can slash enemies with his Bone, dodge attacks, and throw his skull to damage enemies or teleport to where it landed. The player can remove Skul's head and replace it with a skull that he finds, giving him abilities in combat. Skul can equip up to two heads at a time, and can switch between both during combat.

Levels are procedurally generated, and have a boss at the end of every three stages. At the end of each level, Skul may choose between two doors, which have different contents inside. Levels may contain a skull, gold, shops, or a sanctuary area where Skul can spend gold in exchange for hit points or helpful items.

== Development and release ==
Skul: The Hero Slayer was developed by Southpaw Games, which launched a crowdfunding campaign for development. It was released as early access on 19 February 2020 and published by Neowiz. A full release was launched on 21 January 2021.

== Reception ==
The game received generally favorable reviews, according to review aggregator Metacritic. Travis Northrup of IGN compared the game to Dead Cells and The Legend of Zelda: Majora's Mask, praising the diversity in playstyles that the skulls offered, while criticizing the game's bosses as repetitive. Alex Orona of Nintendo World Report liked the game's music and fast-paced combat, but considered the story sparse and simplistic. Ben Kuchera of Polygon enjoyed the enemy behavior and combat execution, saying it outweighed a poorly translated story and repetitive music.

=== Sales ===
As of January 2022 the game had sold over 1 million copies worldwide. As of December 2023, the game had sold over 2 million copies.
