= DJ Max Fever =

2009 video game

- Developer: Pentavision
- Publisher: PM Studios
- Series: DJ Max
- Platform: PlayStation Portable
- Release: NA: January 27, 2009; EU: May 26, 2010 (PSN)
- Genre: Music
- Modes: Single-player, Multiplayer

DJ Max Fever (Korean: 디제이맥스 피버, dijeimaegseu pibeo; abbr.: DMF) is a music game for the PlayStation Portable developed by Pentavision and PM Studios. It was released in 2009. Although the franchise has made several appearances in Asia, DJ Max Fever is the first DJMax released in the United States and Europe. The game is a compilation of DJMax Portable (2006) and DJMax Portable 2 (2007) along with additional features. By decision of PM Studios, it is the only title in the DJMax series with a space between words "DJ" and "Max". A digital version of the game was released in 2010 on PlayStation Network, but later removed due to licensing expiration.

== Gameplay ==
A player chooses a song, a video will start to play in the background, and the gear screen will display falling notes. As the notes cross the line in the gear, the player must hit the corresponding button, to score points. The objective of the game is to earn a high score and ranks in order to unlock more items such as avatars, songs, gears and more.

In terms of gameplay, DJ Max Fever is similar to other music games like Beatmania. When the notes are pressed in time, the combo counter will increase, missing the note will cause the combo counter to "break" which will reset the combo. As that combo count climbs, a Fever Gauge will fill. When the Fever bar is full, tapping X will double the combo and score, then triple if it is maintained properly and will continue to increase. On the right side of the screen is the healthbar. Once it's depleted, the game is over. There are 50 songs to go through and there are many varieties of songs to choose from, ranging from Techno to Pop, Rock to Hip-Hop, and more.

== Features ==
The game is mostly based on DJMax Portable 2 but uses the DJMax Portable Black Square (2008) Entire Control System, meaning the green notes that appear will stop the music track if missed. There is the auto-correct function, as for example if you hit the ◄ with ▲, your hit will be auto corrected, deducting however 20% of the score the note would normally get. 8B mode loading screens don't show the name of the song unlike in DJMax Portable 2. Also some of the "achievement discs" have been changed.

Since this is the first DJMax game released in Northern America, there was no need for "the Link Disc" function and was removed for the Fever. The game is also toned down to be generally easier to play than most of the other DJMax games. Most mission songs have been changed, and the requirements have been toned down. Also the level cap of 30 for Easy difficulty has been removed and the score penalty for Easy difficulty has been reduced.

The soundtrack of the game is a selected combination of song from DJMax Portable and DJMax Portable 2. There is a DJ Max Fever exclusive song called "Hip Hop Rescue" by "D.O" which uses the same music video as "Let Go". "MV" mode now has more videos, and some descriptions have been changed. "Album" has been removed from "Collection". Videos called "GET ON TOP ~No Cut Version~" and "DJMax Portable 2 ~Credits~" have been removed from the "Media" section of "Collection".

Like DJMax Clazziquai Edition and Black Square, DJ Max Fever prevents the transfer of save files, by associating the saved data with the MAC address of the PSP. If a save file is transferred to a PSP either by swapping memory sticks or downloading, the game recognizes the mismatch and refuses to load the game data. This can be circumvented using a MAC address spoofer. However, if the player puts the save file on a different Memory Stick, and uses the Memory Stick on the same PSP the Save File is created on, the data will still load.

== Releases ==
The game was initially set to be released at November 11, 2008 but was delayed to January 27, 2009 due to adding additional features and a new engine called "BS" to be compatible with the PSP-3000.

30 limited edition versions were available to those who won the DJ Max Fever Contest hosted by Joystiq on March 16, 2009. Each set contained a copy of the game, soundtrack, art book, puzzle, post cards, and mask. On April 9, 2009 a second limited edition called DJ Max Fever -the crew edition- was available for pre-order by Bemanistyle. DJ Max Fever Crew Edition contained the same as the original along with Technika Playing Cards. Only 125 copies were made but were sold out before being released.

On January 20, 2010, DJ Max Fever was re-released in North America on PlayStation Network, followed by the European version on May 26, 2010. The PlayStation Network version fixed many of the bugs found in the original UMD version. PM Studios is currently considering what to do with the issue of UMD owners who want the bugfixes, considering that a save file can't be transferred between a UMD game and a downloadable one.

The digital version has since been removed from the PlayStation Network with no explanation given from PM Studios or Pentavision as to why it was removed.

== Reception ==
Reception

Aggregate score
Aggregator	Score
Metacritic	77/100

Review score
Publication	Score
IGN	8/10

The game received "generally favorable reviews" according to the review aggregation website Metacritic. Greg Miller of IGN said, "it isn't perfect, but it is fun."

== See also ==
- DJMax Portable Hot Tunes - A similar compilation version marketed towards South Korea
