= DJMax Technika Q =

2013 video game

- Title screen
- Developers: Planet Team (2013-2017); Team ARES, Neowiz MUCA (as of 2017)
- Publisher: Neowiz Games
- Director: XeoN
- Producer: Planetboom
- Designers: Batistiger, Santina, Cheesecake, ENTIA J
- Engine: Unity 3D
- Platforms: iOS, Android
- Release: October 13, 2013; March 25, 2014 (Global); June 21, 2017 (Services merged)
- Genre: Music
- Mode: Single-player Multiplayer

DJMax Technika Q was a music mobile game developed by Team ARES and published by Neowiz Games in South Korea, and was an adaptation of the earlier DJMax Technika arcade series.

== Development ==
DJMax Technika Q was released in September 2013, developed by Planet Team, a team made up of earlier Pentavision team members. New features in the game include a Lucky mechanic for occasionally getting extra points from perfectly hit notes, high-quality videos during gameplay, competitions between friends and an achievement system.

In April 2017, after DJMax Ray end-of-life announcement, Neowiz Games has announced that DJMax Technika Q will continue the development process due to the release of DJMax Respect starting with music pack update, remove the friends feature, and enhance security system of the game. In June 2017, Neowiz Games has teased a new redesigned UI of the game that updated on June 21, 2017. With this update, Neowiz Games has merged the KakaoGames version into global version and announce that users of KakaoGames service can transfer the user profiles to global version.

On January 16, 2019, it was announced that DJMax Technika Q would be discontinued, followed by the discontinuation of in-app purchases. On February 28, 2019, the game was removed from App Store and Google Play, and the game was eventually closed four weeks thereafter.

== Gameplay ==
Gameplay screenshot of DJMax Technika Q, demonstrating the new customised game interface for running on mobile platform

The gameplay has the same playing style as all other games in the DJMax Technika series. The game requires the player to touch note icons which appear at various points on the mobile device touchscreen, in sync with the rhythm of a song as it plays. Timing is indicated by a bar, the "timeline", which scrolls along the top and bottom halves of the screen over the notes. There are various different note types as well, and each type of note requires a different interaction. A life gauge will decrease when notes are missed. If the life gauge is depleted during a song, the player receives a game over, ending the song.

Each note increases the player's score for a song based on the accuracy of the player's touch timing. The game incorporates the judgment system of DJMax Technika Tune, which displays a percentage-based accuracy rating for each note on-screen, and adjusts the score value of each note based on the percentage, ranging from 100% to 1%. Consecutively hitting multiple notes increases the player's combo. Missing a note results in the accuracy rating "BREAK", and resets the combo to 0.

While playing, the Fever meter builds up as notes are successfully touched, but decreases if notes are missed; once the fever meter is full, the player may activate "fever mode" for a limited number of seconds, depleting the fever meter at the same time. During Fever mode, the maximum score value for every note is always awarded as long as the note is successfully hit, regardless of accuracy. However, unlike the fever modes of other games in the DJMax Technika series, fever mode in this game is limited to two activations per song by default, upgradable to a maximum of three activations per song.

Only one gameplay mode is available: Quick Play. In this mode, the player selects one song to play at a time. The "mixing" modes of the other games in the DJMax Technika series are not present.

Before playing a song, player can select the number of lines in the note track and the song difficulty. Players can also upgrade statistics such as the length of Fevers, the number of missed notes in the song (called breaks) that will be replaced with 1% hits, and how much the gauge refills during the song. At last, player can select effector to add more difficulty at last screen before starting the game.

Players can get a "Lucky Shot" while touching certain notes. Lucky Shots are special notes that result in additional points gained. The player can increase the probability of Lucky Shots by leveling up.

== Development and release ==
DJMax Technika Q was published by Neowiz. It was released on 15 October 2013 for iOS and Android. It closed down on 29 March 2019.

== Reception ==
Reception

Review score
Publication	Score
TouchArcade	3.5/5

Touch Arcade enjoyed the game's "incredibly fine-tuned and enjoyable rhythm engine", which it felt was similar to the handling of the controls of the game, but felt it was "hampered by the bloated systems placed on top of its core gameplay".
