= Bless Online =

- Logo
- Developer: Neowiz Bless Studio
- Publisher: Neowiz Games
- Director: Jacob Han
- Engine: Unreal Engine 3
- Platform: Microsoft Windows
- Release: WW: 2018
- Genre: MMORPG

Bless Online (Korean: 블레스, romanized: Beulleseu) was a massively multiplayer online role-playing game developed by Neowiz Games. The release date was May 28, 2018, for Founder's Pack purchasers and May 30 for Early Access on Steam. Bless Online uses a free-to-play business model.

== Gameplay ==
Bless is set in a fantasy world. The main story revolves around a decade-long war between two factions, the nation of Hieron and the nation of Unión. The game world is separated by different climatic zones. Players can choose their character's race and class, with race determining which faction they align with. Players can join PvP castle sieges, to advance their faction power. Winning sieges grants new quests, and resources. Faction and race dependent role-playing scenarios are also available for players to advance their character progress.

=== Characters ===
Bless Online features humanoid races for players to choose from when creating a character. The races of Hieron are composed of the Habichts (Korean: 하비히츠, romanized: Habihicheu), the Sylvan Elves (Korean: 실반 엘프, romanized: Silban Elpeu), the wolf-like Lufus (Korean: 루푸스, romanized: Lupuseu), the Fedayin (Korean: 페 다인, romanized: Pedain), and the Mascu (Korean: 마 스쿠, romanized: Maseuku). The Unión's races consist of the Amistad (Korean: 아미 스타드, romanized: Amiseutadeu), the Aqua Elves (Korean: 아쿠아 엘프, romanized: Akua Elpeu), the catlike Pantera (Korean: 판테라, romanized: Pantela), the Iblis (Korean: 이블리스, romanized: Ibeulliseu), and the Sirens (Korean: 시렌, romanized: Silen).

== Development ==
Bless was initially announced as BLESS, back in 2011. Bless was developed with Unreal Engine 3, a game engine by Epic Games. Bless' western version was cancelled by game publisher Aeria Games in 2017, however, in response Neowiz plans to self-publish the game. In July 2017, Neowiz Games announced their Rebuild Project in order to address many game specific components. At TwitchCon 2017, Neowiz announced that the release date would be sometime in 2018 and that Bless will become available at Steam, as part of the early access program. Steam's early access included localized versions for English, German and Russian languages. Two mobile games based on the Bless IP were announced, one using Unreal Engine 4. As of October 2017, Neowiz Games was still assessing in-game monetization options. The last remaining server in Korea was shut down on November 19, 2018.

=== Beta testing ===
The first closed beta testing began in 2014 in South Korea. Since August 2017, the open beta phase of Bless is available on South Korean servers. Japanese closed beta testing began in April and proceeded in October 2017. From December 2016 until May 2017 an open beta version of the Bless client was hosted on servers located in Russia before being shut down after failing to gain traction.

== Final release (United States and Europe) ==
Bless Online released in Early Access on Steam for Founder's Pack purchasers on May 28, 2018, and Early Access on May 30, 2018. The Steam version closed on September 9, 2019, with its struggling userbase size cited as a main reason by media outlets.
