= WIPI (platform) =

Mobile middleware platform

- Hangul: 위피
- Revised Romanization: Wipi
- McCune–Reischauer: Wip'i

WIPI (/ˈwɪpi/; Korean pronunciation: [wipʰi]), Wireless Internet Platform for Interoperability, was a middleware platform used in South Korea that allowed mobile phones, regardless of manufacturer or carrier, to run applications. Much of WIPI was based on Java, but it also included the ability to download and run compiled binary applications as well.

The specification was created by the Mobile Platform Special Subcommittee of the Korea Wireless Internet Standardization Forum (KWISF). The South Korean government declared that all cellular phones sold in that country include the WIPI platform to avoid inordinate competition between mobile companies, but the policy has been withdrawn from April 2009.
