= DJMax Technika 3 =

2011 video game

- Title screen of DJMax Technika 3
- Developer: Pentavision
- Publisher: Pentavision
- Producer: Xeronion
- Designer: Xeronion
- Platform: Arcade
- Release: KOR: October 27, 2011; NA: December 10, 2011; PHL: December 18, 2011; SGP: December 25, 2011; CHN: January 17, 2012; THA: January 20, 2012; AU: January 23, 2012; CHL: August 9, 2012
- Genre: Music
- Modes: Single-player, multiplayer

DJMax Technika 3 (Korean: 디제이맥스 테크니카3) is a music arcade game published and developed by Pentavision in South Korea, and is a sequel to the earlier DJMax Technika 2 arcade game in the DJMax game series.

== Announcement ==
The development of DJMax Technika 3 was publicly announced by Pentavision on September 7, 2011. The announcement explained that the game would feature music tracks from artists in earlier DJMax games such as Croove, NDLee and Tsukasa, in addition to new artists, including Laurent Newfield and TANUKI. Tracks by the Korean girl band KARA were also mentioned to be included within the game.

According to the official press release by Pentavision, "the game will feature new and upgraded content of the rhythm game loved by enthusiasts, and the stylish design will attract new players... information regarding location testing schedules and support information will eventually be released".

== Game information ==
Gameplay screenshot of DJMax Technika 3, demonstrating the new game interface.

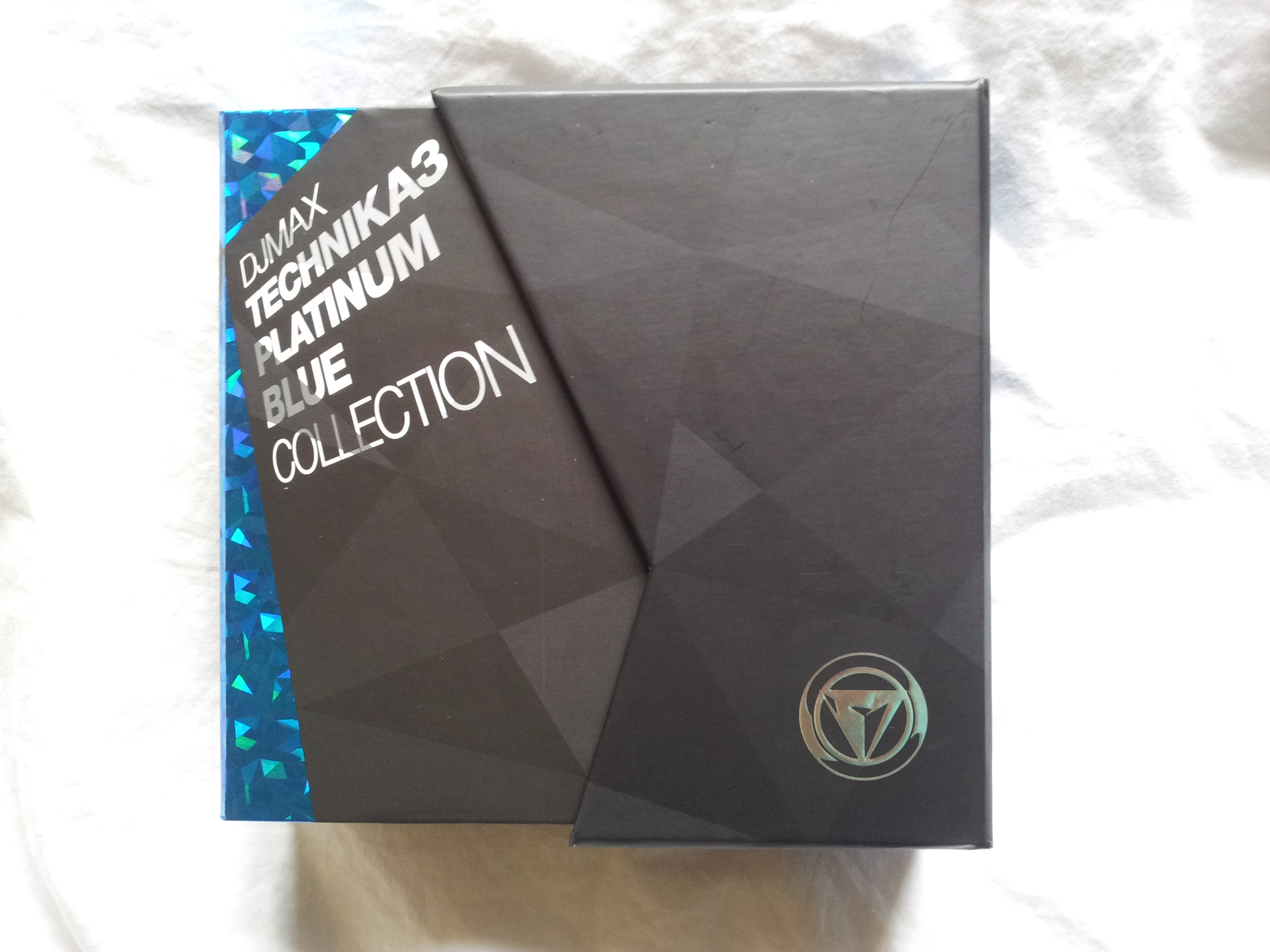
Box of the Technika 3 Platinum Blue Collection.

As with earlier DJMax Technika games, Technika 3 utilizes the Platinum Crew service for online play and rankings. The Crew Challenge mode includes various mission modes of varying difficulties and involves various "crew" teamplay elements.

Various merchandise was sold by Pentavision, including the DJMAX Technika 3 Limited Edition OST package, as well as a Platinum Blue Collection which includes the game soundtrack, Platinum Blue International IC Card (for gameplay), a card case and stickers. The Platinum Blue Collection was limited to a number of 2000 copies for sale. The International IC cards can be used on any Technika 3 machine worldwide, however data cannot be transferred from region to region, similar to the limited edition Technika 2 Signature IC cards that were bundled within game soundtrack packages.

=== Gameplay ===
In the same playing style with earlier editions of DJMax Technika, the game requires the player to touch musical notes which appear at various points on the arcade touchscreen in sync with the rhythm of a song as it plays, specifically as a bar which moves along the upper and bottom halves of the screen crosses the notes. There are various different note types as well, and each category of notes are played in a different manner. Whilst playing, the fever meter builds up as notes are successfully touched on progression; once full the player may activate Fever mode, which increases the score value of each note for a limited duration. The "groove meter" will decrease if notes are missed, and once empty the player fails the chart and the game concludes.

The game features five game modes:

- Star Mixing: Explained within the in-game menu as "normal difficulty", this single player mode uses three rows of notes. One play involves three songs which are manually selected by the player.
- Pop Mixing: Explained within the in-game menu as "hard difficulty", this single player mode uses four rows of notes. One play involves three songs which are manually selected by the player.
- Club Mixing: Explained within the in-game menu as "maniac difficulty", this single player mode uses four rows of notes. The player selects a mixing set of songs that contain a limited range of six songs, and of these six, three songs are chosen to be played in any order determined by the player. A fourth song is determined based on the player's performance.
- Crew Race: Explained within the in-game menu as "various difficulty", this is an online mode. One play involves three songs, and the mode involves the player competing against a challenge based on computer-generated scores.
- Crew Challenge: Explained within the in-game menu as "various difficulty", this is an online mode. This mode features competitions, events and game challenge missions, and up to three songs are played. The types of missions available are:
  - Crew Mission: Mode based on cooperative play, which gives rewards when team players clear the mission.
  - Challenge Mission: Mode containing challenges to be cleared.
  - Special Mission: Mode containing missions from competitions and events.

The player is able to record their scores and gather MAX points by saving data on an IC card. MAX points are used to purchase additional songs, effectors, DJ icons, notes and emblems.

== Development and release ==
DJMax Technika 3 was developed by Pentavision. The soundtrack in Technika 3 was released as a downloadable content for DJMax Respect in 2019.

== See also ==
- DJMax Technika
