= DJMax Technika =

2008 video game

DJMAX Technika
- Promotion poster for DJMax Technika (China)
- Developer: Pentavision
- Publisher: Pentavision
- Designer: ponGlow
- Platform: Arcade
- Release: Arcade: KOR: October 31, 2008; TWN: April 10, 2009; HKG: April 27, 2009; NA: Early June 2009; PHL: July 2009; THA: July 6, 2009; CHN: August 26, 2009; SGP: November 2009; AU: December 24, 2009; JP: December 21, 2010; UK: Cancelled
- Genre: Music video game
- Modes: Single-player, multiplayer

DJMax Technika (Korean: 디제이맥스 테크니카; abbr.: DMT) is an arcade music game published and developed by Pentavision in South Korea. This was the first game announced as part of the DJMax METRO PROJECT. An international version of the game was released in North America by PM Studios. A sequel to the game, DJMax Technika 2, was announced on March 4, 2010. DJMax Technika Tune is an adaptation of the game for the PlayStation Vita. DJMax Technika Q for the iOS and Android platforms was announced in September 2013, and the global version was released on March 25, 2014. On December 9, 2013, it was announced that the online service for DJMax Technika 2 and DJMax Technika 3 would be closed on December 31, 2013.

== Cabinet ==
The arcade cabinet consists of two screens, a bottom 22-inch touch screen where the game is played, and an upper 32-inch screen for spectators to view, both in Hi-Definition. There is a vibrating stage and game-based lights and speakers. There is an ID-Card Reader for people who have a Platinum Crew ID Card.

The system is powered by Intel Celeron E1400, 2GB of RAM, Biostar P31 mainboard, 160GB Western Digital hard drive, Creative Audigy Sound card and ATI Radeon graphics, with Windows XP Embedded as the core operating system. The touch screen is infrared which allows multiple simultaneous input during gameplay.

== Gameplay ==
Gameplay screenshot of Oblivion TP.

The game offers four gameplay types:

- Lite Mixing - A tutorial and three songs can be played. The difficulty of songs is easier than latter modes, and unlike Popular Mixing mode, the result is not recorded on Platinum Crew. This mode only contains a song pattern called Lite Pattern, and not all songs are playable in this mode.
- Popular Mixing - Normal gameplay mode where three songs can be played. Most of the songs that appear have the Popular Pattern note chart.
- Technical Mixing - four songs can be played. The player can select three songs from a disk set. The last song to be played is determined by the play result of previous three stages. Some of the songs on Technical Mixing mode may not be available in Popular Mixing mode. This mode contains a note chart called Technical Pattern, where songs have faster scroll speeds or different, harder notes in comparison to their Popular Pattern counterparts.
- Platinum Mixing - Only available to people who have a Platinum Crew ID Card, and the machine they're playing on has to be connected to the internet (something common in Korean arcades, but less than often seen in America, where arcades have lost popularity). This mode features a series of missions. Player may be rewarded by Max points and items. Some of the hidden songs, hidden patterns, and Technical Mixing Discs Sets can be unlocked only through missions (although, players only get to use them a certain number of times and after that, they have to complete the mission again to get more uses, and uses can be stockpiled onto each other). Events and online tournaments are also held in this mode. This mode contains a note chart exclusive to it called Special Pattern, though only a handful of songs have it. The Special Pattern is arranged in sets of 3 and every month, a new set of three songs get special patterns (e.g. February 2009 Special Patterns is Flea, Supersonic, then Oblivion) and completing them gets rewards.

The player has 60 seconds to pick a song. If the timer hits zero, the song currently highlighted will be chosen.

The player must touch the notes as the time line crosses them. If they fail to touch them after the time line passes them, it counts as a break, which means the combo is reset to zero and the player loses HP, which is also recovered when notes are hit. When the player's HP decreases to zero, the game ends.

The game has 4 types of note charts:

- Lite Pattern - Only used in Lite Mixing, easiest note chart in the game.
- Popular Pattern - Used in Popular Mixing. Some popular patterns also used in Technical Mixing. (ex: Dear my lady, Creator, BlythE, Sweet shining shooting star)
- Technical Pattern - Used in Technical Mixing, but the Technical Patterns can be unlocked to use in Popular Mixing through completing missions in Platinum Mixing.
- Special Pattern - Appears in Platinum Mixing only. Only a handful of songs have this pattern. Every month a set of three songs with this pattern appears.

When compared to the charts of the PSP DJMax games, Popular, Technical, and Special Patterns are the Technika equivalent of Normal Style, Hard Style, and MX Style note charts respectively, and Lite pattern is the Technika equivalent of Easy Style in the early DJMax Online game.

Note Types:

- Note - Simply touch the note once, when the time line matches the center of the note.
- Dragging Long Note - Drag the circular note along the path while keeping it on the time line.
- Repeat Note - Keep pressing the circular note each time the time line is on a little purple line that is part of this note.
- Holding Long Note - Hold finger on the circular note until the time line passes the blue line at the end of the note.
- Chain Note - Hit all notes in the path when time line passes over them.

== Development and release ==
DJMax Technika was developed by Pentavision, which commenced Metro Project in 2008, whose goal was to enter the arcade video game market while creating the DJMax Portable series. A location test took place on 15 August 2008 at Seoul Isu Theme Park arcade.

== See also ==
- DJMax
- DJMax Technika 3
- DJMax Technika Tune
