= DJMax Portable Black Square =

2008 video game

DJMAX Portable Black Square
- Developer: Pentavision
- Publishers: KOR: Pentavision; JP: CyberFront
- Designer: ponGlow
- Series: DJ Max
- Platform: PlayStation Portable
- Release: KOR: December 24, 2008; JP: March 22, 2012
- Genre: Music video game
- Modes: Single-player, Multiplayer

DJMax Portable Black Square (Korean: 디제이맥스 포터블 블랙 스퀘어, dijeimaegseu poteobeul beullaeg seukweeo; abbr.: DMP:BS) is a music game for the PlayStation Portable developed by South Korean developer Pentavision released on December 24, 2008. It was the fourth major game of the DJMax series released for the PSP. The game includes various enhancements and new features built on from DJMax Portable 2 and DJMax Portable Clazziquai Edition. The original aim was to launch the game in November, however due to numerous bugs or piracy issues with DJMax Portable Clazziquai Edition, the release of DJMax Portable Black Square was postponed. The game was released in Japan on March 22, 2012, it removes the autocorrect feature and Japanese is the only language option available, yet most of the game retains English titles for songs, artwork and so on.

== Features ==
DJMax Black Square features largely the same features as Clazziquai Edition, but with increased difficulty and an almost completely different song list. It has the same user interface as Clazziquai Edition, but with a different "Bling Style" theme. In Black Square, 2B Mode, which was featured in Clazziquai Edition, has been removed. 8B Mode has been re-introduced into the series and has been renamed 6BFX Mode for this release. Black Square features note auto-correction which corrects the notes player misses. Black Square has an enhanced Fever bonus which can go up to a x7 multiplier. Black Square also has an extended Club Tour mode.

In Black Square, a specialized note appears that's a different color than the rest, hitting these notes gives the player 1,000 bonus points and 1,000 extra points every time they hit another note of the same kind (ex: hit once in a row: 1,000, hit twice in a row, 2,000, hit ten times in a row: 10,000). The note also has a penalty - the music stops if it is missed. The music starts playing again when the next special note is hit, and the extra points are reset to 1000. Black Square introduces RD (Redesign) song patterns to the game series. Some songs have a special pattern, called RD style, that appears in the place of MX patterns on the song selection screen. This pattern is a remixed version of the song, and is usually harder. The RD songs can also be listened to on a special disc in Album Mode. Players can use Link Disc feature with DJMax Portable Clazziquai Edition, allowing them to play the songs of Clazziquai Edition along with song patterns and RD patterns unique to Black Square. Link Disc with DJMax Portable 1 and 2 is also possible but only unlocks avatars, songs, notes, and gears for Black Square.

As with DJ Max Fever, DJMax Portable Black Square prevents the transfer of save files by associating the saved data with the MAC address of the PSP. If a save file is transferred to a PSP either by swapping memory sticks or downloading, the game recognizes the mismatch and refuses to load the game data. This can be circumvented using a MAC address spoofer. However, if the player puts the save file on a different Memory Stick, and uses the Memory Stick on the same PSP the Save File is created on, the data will still load.

== Releases ==
Black Square was released in three different packages in Korea: the normal retail edition, a limited edition and two-in-one limited package which has both normal retail versions of Clazziquai Edition and Black Square. In Japan, the game is set to be released in normal and limited editions.

=== Limited Edition ===
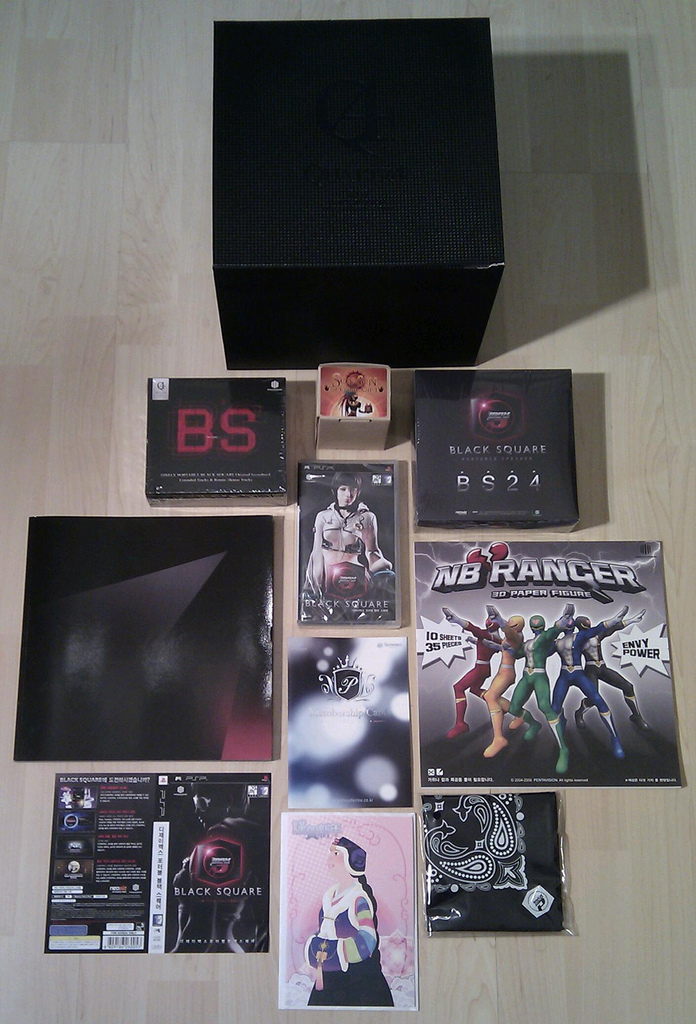
Packaging of the DJMax Portable Black Square Quattra Limited Edition and its contents

A limited collector's edition package called DJMax Portable Black Square - Quattra Limited Edition was also released in limited quantities. Only 1,500 of these were manufactured. Black Square is the fourth title in the DJMax series and the name for this special package is derived from Italian word "Quattro" which means number "four". The package itself is a black cube. A two-day pre-order event was held for people whom wanted to reserve this package for themselves. On December 6, 2008, the first 1,000 packages of the limited edition became available for pre-order and later on December 7, 2008, the last 500 packages became available.

The limited edition is delivered in a package called DJMax Portable Black Square Premium Limited case which has a magnet-based door mechanism. It contains a retail version of the DJMax Portable Black Square PSP game, an original soundtrack which consists of four audio CDs, an art book called Illusion: DJMAX Metro Project Visualization Book containing notes about the development of the game, graphical art and credits with pictures of every developer. The package also has small portable speakers, a Black Square themed bandana, a 2009 new year's card, and a Son of Sun Special Gift which consists of plant seeds and a cup. The package also has a few other items included although they aren't mentioned in the product description. These additional items are a TECHNIKA IC Card: Black Square Edition, a Black Square limited package cover and a NB Ranger 3D paper figure.

The Japanese limited edition contains an art book, four CDs and the Japanese version of the game.

Track Listing

Black Disc
No.	Title	Writer(s)	Vocals	Length
1.	"Get Down"	BJJ	Brandy (feat. Jessica Kim)	1:49
2.	"STOP"	3rd Coast	So fly (rap feat. JC)	1:30
3.	"Ruti'n"	Bexter	So fly (rap feat. JC)	1:42
4.	"Fever Pitch Girl"	Nikacha	So fly (rap feat. JC)	1:39
5.	"Y" ((BS Style))	ND Lee	Silver	1:49
6.	"Remember"	Lin-G	Miya	1:49
7.	"Sweet Shining Shooting Star"	Croove	So fly (feat. JC)	1:40
8.	"Secret World"	Sweetune	Miya	1:42
9.	"Lovely Hands"	Planetboom	Miya	1:40
10.	"I want You"	Lin-G	Jay	1:50
11.	"Honeymoon"	Humming Urban Stereo	Yozoh	1:39
12.	"Lover" ((BS Style))	ND Lee	Young	1:30
13.	"Jealousy"	3rd Coast	So fly (rap feat. JC)	1:32
14.	"The Last Dance" ((English Version))	Urbatronic Chopsticks	Esprit Lee (rap feat. KID K)	1:42
15.	"PDM"	Trish	Trish (rap feat. Zito)	1:49
16.	"Desperado"	Croove	JC	1:41
17.	"Supersonic"	Planetboom	Planetboom (rap feat. Mike Blunck)	1:46
18.	"Keys to the World"	Planetboom	Yohan (Pia)	1:30
19.	"Fury"	Sugardonut	Sugardonut	1:44
20.	"In my Dream"	ND Lee		1:40
21.	"Shoreline"	Oriental ST8		1:38

Square Disc
No.	Title	Writer(s)	Vocals	Length
1.	"Landscape"	Tsukasa	Miya	1:41
2.	"Colours of Sorrow"	Tsukasa	nomico	1:41
3.	"Fermion"	Makou		1:48
4.	"Heart of Witch"	ReX		1:34
5.	"Proposed, Flower, Wolf Part 2" (고백, 꽃, 늑대 Part 2)	ReX		1:53
6.	"Grave Consequence"	Tsukasa		1:44
7.	"Beat U Down"	Makou		1:36
8.	"Cypher Gate"	7 Sequence		1:47
9.	"Play the Future"	Urbatronic Chopsticks	Mellow Funk Sound	1:55
10.	"Ready Now"	Ruby Tuesday	LEAH	1:41
11.	"Dear my lady"	Oriental ST8		1:36
12.	"Melody"	bermei.inazawa	Esprit Lee	1:48
13.	"Super lovely"	EarBreaker		2:10
14.	"Ask to wind (Live Mix)" (바람에게 부탁해 (Live Mix))	Forte Escape		1:49
15.	"River Flow"	Planetboom		2:16
16.	"Relation Again"	Tsukasa		2:19
17.	"Voyage"	Makou	Lin	1:45
18.	"DJMAX"	Humming Urban Stereo	J-Dogg (Rhymebus)	1:37
19.	"Get Up"	Croove	So fly feat. JC	2:15
20.	"Real Over Drive"	NieN		2:02
21.	"SON OF SUN"	Hosoe Shinji		1:45

Extended Disc
No.	Title	Writer(s)	Vocals	Length
1.	"Get Down (Extended Version)"	BJJ	Brandy feat. Jessica Kim	3:38
2.	"Y (BS Style Extended Version)"	ND Lee	Silver	3:32
3.	"Fever Pitch Girl (Extended Version)"	Nikacha	So fly rap feat. JC	2:24
4.	"Jealousy (Extended Version)"	3rd Coast	So fly rap feat. JC	2:33
5.	"Secret World (Extended Version)"	Sweetune	Miya	3:19
6.	"Lovely Hands (Extended Version)"	Planetboom	Miya	1:55
7.	"Lover (BS Style Extended Version)"	ND Lee	Young	3:29
8.	"Play the Future (Extended Version)"	Urbatronic Chopsticks		3:42
9.	"STOP (Extended Version)"	3rd Coast	So fly feat. JC	3:06
10.	"Keys to the world (Extended Version)"	Planetboom	Yohan (Pia)	2:10
11.	"In my Dream (Extended Version)"	ND Lee		2:56
12.	"Ready Now (Extended Version)"	Ruby Tuesday	LEAH	3:03
13.	"Colours of Sorrow (JAP Extended Version)"	Tsukasa	nomico	5:35
14.	"Melody (JAP Extended Version)"	bermei.inazawa	Mayu	4:49
15.	"SON OF SUN (Extended Version)"	Hosoe Shinji		3:07

Special+Bonus Disc
No.	Title	Writer(s)	Vocals	Length
1.	"Proposed, Flower, Wolf (Acoustic Version)" (고백, 꽃, 늑대 (Acoustic Version))	ReX	EriaN	1:54
2.	"Fate (English Version)"	STi		1:43
3.	"Remember (Another Version)"	Lin-G	Miya	1:49
4.	"Jealousy (2Step Mix)"	3rd Coast	So fly rap feat. JC	1:37
5.	"Memory of Beach (Remix)"	M2U	Sanch rap feat. HaNi	2:16
6.	"Airwave (DJMAX Portable CE PV Music)"	ReX		4:49
7.	"HEXAD (DJMAX Portable BS PV Music)"	Electronic Boutique		1:40
8.	"White Canvas"	ReX		1:39
9.	"Dream of Winds"	XeoN		4:02
10.	"Love Clazzico (DJMAX Portable CE Title Music)"	ReX		1:13
11.	"Black SQ (DJMAX Portable BS Title Music)"	Urbatronic Chopsticks		1:18
12.	"Get Out (U.C Mix)"	ND Lee	Gypsi Road & Jimmy Len	1:42
13.	"PDM (Original Version)"	Trish	?? (rap feat. Zito)	1:46
14.	"Vacation"	STi		1:57
15.	"Proposed, Flower, Wolf Part.2 (Classic Version)" (고백, 꽃, 늑대 Part.2 (Classic Version))	ReX		2:07
16.	"Lover (RD Mix)"	ND Lee (Redesign XeoN)	Young	1:29
17.	"I Want You (RD Mix)"	Lin-G (Redesign XeoN)	Jay	1:50
18.	"Shoreline (RD Mix)"	Oriental ST8 (Redesign XeoN)		1:38
19.	"Honeymoon (RD Mix)"	Humming Urban Stereo (Redesign SIJIN)	Yozoh	1:41
20.	"Y (RD Mix)"	ND Lee (Redesign 7 Sequence)	Silver	1:46
21.	"Cypher Gate (RD Mix)"	7 Sequence (Redesign 7 Sequence)		1:47
22.	"Taekwonburi (RD Mix)" (태권부리 (RD Mix))	xxdbxx (Redesign Electronic Boutique)		1:58

== Development and release ==
DJMax Portable Black Square was developed by Pentavision. It was released in South Korea on 24 October 2008. Its data file got leaked a day before the release date.
