= DJMax Technika 2 =

2010 video game

DJMAX Technika 2
- Promotional teaser for DJMax Technika 2
- Developer: Pentavision
- Publisher: Pentavision
- Designer: ponGlow
- Platform: Arcade
- Release: KOR: 16 June 2010; AU: 5 August 2010; PHL: 10 August 2010; HKG: 22 September 2010; TWN: 30 September 2010; SGP: Cancelled; IDN: 26 November 2010; THA: 31 December 2010; NA: 18 October 2010; JP: 27 September 2012
- Genre: Music video game
- Modes: Single-player, multiplayer

DJMax Technika 2 (Korean: 디제이맥스 테크니카 2) is a music arcade game published and developed by Pentavision in South Korea, and is a sequel to the earlier DJMax Technika arcade game.

== Announcement ==
The project was revealed to the public on 4 March 2010, when a notice was placed on the front page of the Korean Platinum Crew website regarding DJMax Technika 2.

== Game information ==
Gameplay screenshot showing the new long purple notes and Fever mode in Pop Mixing.

As with DJMax Technika, the game will feature online elements through the Platinum Crew service. DJMax Technika 2 is expected to hold more online functionality than DJMax Technika.

The first location test for Technika 2 took place at Isu Theme Park from 23 April 2010. The features revealed to the public include:

- Duo Mixing: The screen is divided into four blocks with each player responsible for 2 blocks on each side and the two players can play co-operatively although only all the song M/Vs are replaced by one generic background.
- Star Mixing: The equivalent of Lite Mixing from the original DJMax Technika, where three lanes are available for play. Fever (see below) cannot be used in this mode, however an optional guide which aids the player's timing can be turned on and off.
- Pop Mixing: Similar to Popular Mixing of the original Technika, but with minor changes, such as slightly larger notes. The effects such as fade in, fade out, blink, and blind are free for use rather than charging max points in the first version of Technika.
- Club Mixing: The equivalent of Technical Mixing from the original DJMax Technika. Newly added are Non-stop Remixes (see below).
- Selection screen: The player selects a song by choosing one of nine squares that appear per page, similar to Jubeat. A Random select feature is also available.
- Crew Race: A list of player's names appears, which represents a specific course and the record achieved.
- A new "long purple note", which has sections that are held and tapped.
- Improved visual quality and touch panel.
- Different MAX judgment system (Green and Rainbow).
- Score limitation to every song and every mode. Each song have 300,000 scores (in Club Mixing have 1,200,000 scores) and will cutting-down to judgement that player got. (Example: Cozy Quilt HD pattern have 420 notes if player got all rainbow max final score is 300,000 but when player got 5 green max final score is 299,995 and when player got 400 rainbow max and 20 green max during Fever mode activated player will got 20 bonus score and final score is 300,000)
- Song note patterns are referred to as they were in the DJMax's Windows releases and Portable games. (Normal, Hard, and MX styles)
- Non-stop Remix: Allows the player to play a set of remixes from all previous DJMAX games. Only Available in Club Mixing. Examples are Son of Sun Full Version, Y Extended Mix, Thor Extended Mix and NB Ranger Non-Stop Remix (NB Rangers, NB Rangers Returns, NB Power, and Dark Envy all as one song).
- Fever Mode: Fever is a new introduced system for Technika 2 and it is not equivalent to other DJMax games. Fever mode is a helper tool, when it activated player will get all rainbow max (100%) during timing of Fever except Cool/Bad/Miss/Break note. Fever Bonus score will calculate after the game. It can help player to get rainbow perfect play and got 300,000 scores. The Fever gauge is located in between the two lines, and the activate button is located where "BGM Boost" was in the original Technika.
- Max Points shop: Platinum Crew users are able to purchase various items using MAX Points earned in-game, such as avatars, DJ icons, notes, emblems and effectors.

=== Crew Race ===
DJMax Technika 2 has a Crew Race system. A player can create a Crew by spending 10000 MAX Points. This player will also become the Crew's leader, the Crew Master. The Crew Master can invite other players to join the Crew. A Crew can have up to 10 players.

The Crew Master can buy emblems or plates to customize the crew's icon in the MAX Point Shop. If the Crew Master hands the leadership position to another member, the emblems and plates will transfer over to the new leader.

The Crew Master can select a course from the Crew's members to represent the Crew on the Platinum Crew website. This course will appear in the Crew Race mode, which resets every Tuesday. Players can play against other Crew's courses in Crew Race mode. Extra MAX Points will be given if the player beats the course creator's score.

== Technika 2 Signature Collection ==
The DJMax Technika 2 Signature Collection is a collectible pack available for purchase from 30 April 2010 for 28,600 Won, and includes a 2CD Original Soundtrack, a Signature ID Card, card case, key holder and sticker. The Signature IC cards can be used on any Technika 2 machine worldwide, however data cannot be transferred from region to region.

== Development and release ==
DJMax Technika 2 was developed by Pentavision. A location test took place from April 23 to 25, 2010 at Seoul Isu Theme Park arcade.

== See also ==
- DJMax
- DJMax Technika 3
