= DJMax Portable 2 =

2007 video game

DJMAX Portable 2
- Developer: Pentavision
- Publisher: Pentavision
- Designer: ponGlow
- Series: DJ Max
- Platform: PlayStation Portable
- Release: KOR: March 30, 2007
- Genre: Music video game
- Modes: Single-player, Multiplayer

DJMax Portable 2 (DJMAX Portable 2, DMP2; Korean: 디제이맥스 포터블 2) is a music video game published and developed by Pentavision, for the PlayStation Portable which was released on March 30, 2007. This is the second installment of the DJMax Portable series. While the first installment, DJMax Portable, never reached distribution outside of South Korea until the release of DMPi, DJMax Portable 2 was released in Japan along with English packaging and manuals.

== Features ==
DJMax Portable 2 contains new songs, new difficulties, new modes, as well as a few returning tracks from DJMax Portable. A 5-button mode has been included along with a Fever mode and an Easy mode. DJMax Portable 2 can be linked with songs from the DJMax Portable game using a new play system called Link Disk mode. There are also unlockable O.S.T. tracks from the game including Korean, Japanese and English versions of the songs which are played via the soundtrack mode. The game also includes remote control support— using the inline controller with the official PSP headphones, you can control the music in this mode. Customizable control configurations are also included in DJMax Portable 2 allowing you change what the buttons do. Multiplayer is available using the PSP's Ad hoc connection.

== Song list ==
There are 61 playable songs in DJMax Portable 2, 45 of which are available at the start. 15 more songs are unlockable for play via various methods, and the final remaining song (Your Own Miracle, the title song for Portable 2) is only playable under certain circumstances.

A few songs are playable only in 5B. Generally these songs were in Portable 1 (which didn't have a 5B mode).

Songs that require an unlock are marked with (**).

Song title	4B			5B			6B			8B
Song title	NM	HD	MX	NM	HD	MX	NM	HD	MX	NM	HD	MX
A.I	-	-	-	9			-	-	-	-	-	-
A Lie	4			5			5	10		7
** Another DAY	7	8		7	8		8			7
Blythe	7			7			8			8
BRAIN STORM	12			11		13	11			12		14
Brandnew Days	7	10		8			9			7
** Brave it out	8			8			6	9		6	9
Bye Bye Love	8			8			9			8
** Cherokee	8			6	8		6	9		6	9
Chain of Gravity	7			7			4	10		4	10
Dream Of You	7			5			6	11		6	9
DIVINE SERVICE	6			7			4	9		8
End of the Moonlight	-	-	-	8			-	-	-	-	-	-
Every Morning	-	-	-	6			-	-	-	-	-	-
Fallen Angel	4	8		5			3	8		7
** Fentanest	9			9			9			8
For Seasons	1	5		5			5	12		4
Get On Top	6			6			5	9		6
GET OUT	3	5		3	6		5		13	5
Good Bye	5	8		5	8		7			7
Hello Pinky	5	12		5	10		8	12		6	11
higher	6			5			6	12		7	11
IKARUS	8			7			7			8
Ladymade Star	2	9		7	9		7			7
lost n' found	6			5	8		5			5
MASAI	-	-	-	9			-	-	-	-	-	-
** Memoirs	7			7			8			8
Mess it up	5			4	8		10			6	10
Midnight Blood	8			10			10			4	7
miles	2			3			3	8		9		13
** Minus 3	10		12	10			10			11		13
My Alias	8			8			8		13	7
NANO RISK	7			7			8			6
** NB RANGER	7			7			8			8
** NB RANGERS : Returns	10			10			10			9
** NB POWER	12			12		14	11			12
Negative Nature	8			8			8			8
** Nightmare	13			13			13			14
Oblivion	-	-	-	7			-	-	-	-	-	-
Outlaw	-	-	-	8			-	-	-	-	-	-
Phantom of Sky	7			8			6			7
** plastic method	9			7			6	11		8
Right Now	3			4			6			7
Rocka-a-doodle-doo	4	9		7			7			8
** Rolling On the Duck	10			10			10			9		13
Seeker	9			9			7			7
Seoleim	5			4	8		6	9		6
Showtime	8			7	10		8	11		8
Smoky Quartz	5			6			5			6	12
sO mUCH iN LUV	6			7			7			7
SQUEEZE	9			8			8			7	11
Sunset Rider	5			5			5			6	10
STALKER	7			7			8			7		14
** Starfish	8			8			8			9
Stay with me	2			4			3	7		5
** Syriana	7	10		8			10			9
Taekwonburi	6			6			6			6		14
** WhiteBlue	6	10		8	11		8		14	7	13
Yellowberry AJ Mix	6			7			4	9		9
Yo Creo Que Si	8			9			9			9
**** Your Own Miracle	9	11		9			8			9

== Limited Edition Package ==
Limited Edition packages were released in Korea containing:

- DJMax Portable 2 (PlayStation Portable Game)
- DJMax Portable 2 Orpheus Box ~Night Black~
- DJMax Portable 2 Audio Trinity (3CD)
- DJMax Portable 2 Visual Artbook (64 pages)
- DJMax Portable 2 Jigsaw Puzzle (500 pieces)
- DJMax Portable 2 Visual Postcard Set (16 pieces)

== Development and release ==
DJMax Portable 2 was developed and published by Pentavision. It was announced on 26 January 2007 with a trailer. Pentavision revealed Ruby Tuesday's "Your Own Miracle" as a promotional song for the title. DJMax Portable 2 was released in South Korea on 30 March 2007.

== Reception ==
DJMax Portable 2 sold 20,000 copies within the first three days.
