= DJMax Portable =

2006 video game

DJMAX Portable
- Developer: Pentavision
- Publisher: Pentavision
- Designer: ponGlow
- Series: DJMax
- Platform: PlayStation Portable
- Release: KOR: January 14, 2006
- Genre: Music video game
- Mode: Single-player

DJMax Portable (Korean: 디제이맥스 포터블, dijeimaegseu poteobeul; abbr.: DMP) is a music video game developed by Korean game maker Pentavision for the PlayStation Portable. It is a sequel to DJMax Online, a web-based music mixing game for Windows.

== Game modes ==
There are five modes where you play through four courses with increasing difficulty. Rookie DJing mode uses the four basic buttons, Pro DJing uses six and Master DJing uses eight buttons.

Club DJing plays pre-made course of different songs. The player can play through four songs which are related based on either musical genre or theme of the songs.

Freestyle consists of all button modes and allow unlimited combos. In this mode, you can play in either of the three different button modes and play the songs without restrictions. Effectors can change the speed of the game and faders, among other things. There is also a special harder mode depending on the button mode you are in.

== Music ==
DJMax Portable largely features songs from DJMax Online. Soundtrack mostly consists of experimental electronic music but songs from more mainstream genres such as drum and bass and rhythm and blues are also featured through the course of the game.

== International version ==
Shortly after the release of DJMax Portable, the DJMax Portable International Version (DJMAX Portable, DMPi) was released. The way to tell if the game is the original or International is that the International Version is the small letter "I" in the upper right corner of the logo. It allows the ability to play in one of three languages (including English) and a few changes.

- The song "Dreadnought" has been replaced with "River Flow" (the reason being the way the "Dreadnought" music video portrays George W. Bush). Courses with "Dreadnought" have the song replaced with "River Flow" as well.
- Some songs have been taken out altogether.
- Some songs lyrics have been censored and some music videos have been censored as well which could potentially throw off players.
- The opening movie has been subtitled.
- Teletubbies in the song "MASAI" have been removed.

== Development and release ==
DJMax Portable was developed and published by Pentavision. It was intended to be a port of the Windows game, DJMax Online. Pentavision chose the PlayStation Portable because the platform had few rhythm games, with Taiko no Tatsujin: Portable being the only notable competitor. The PlayStation Portable supported high-quality video output and audio, which came across as convenient for the developer. Sony was also in favor of releasing a DJMax title for the system, since it wanted to gain predominance over Nintendo DS within the portable console market.

DJMax Portable was released in South Korea on 14 January 2006.

== Reception ==
DJMax Portable was a commercial success for Pentavision, selling 70,000 copies.
