= Ning Wang =

Ning Wang may refer to:

- Wang Ning (disambiguation), Chinese people with the surname Wang
- Prince of Ning (disambiguation)
