= Smiski =

Japanese collectible figurines

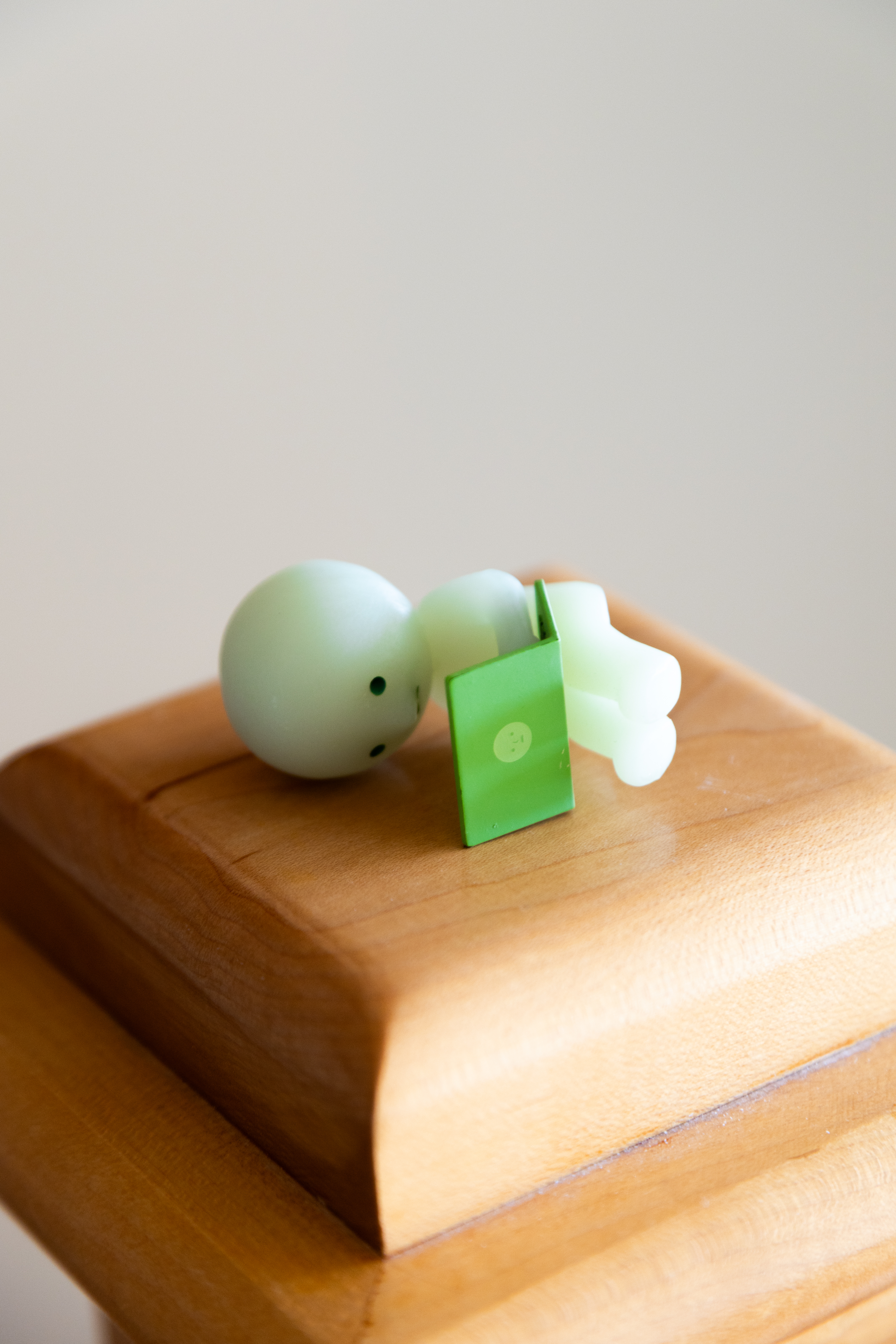
- A Smiski working on its laptop
- Type: Model figure
- Invented by: Toru Soeya
- Company: Dreams Inc.
- Country: Japan
- Availability: 2015–Present
- Official website

Smiski is a line of blind box figures created by Japanese toy manufacturer Toru Soeya, the CEO of Dreams Inc. Sold in blind boxes, Smiski figures glow in the dark and generally depict a range of different activities, like working, exercising, or commuting, to "mimic people's daily lives."

== History ==
Dreams Inc. was founded in 1996; it went on to create many other collectibles like the Sonny Angel. Smiskis were launched in 2015; described as "mysterious," they were named after the word sumi (隅), meaning nook or corner. Known for their minimalist design, they have blue or green bodies made from phosphorescent material with a circular, usually removable head and neutral/consistent facial expression. Smiskis were designed to represent creatures secretly living in people's homes, completing everyday tasks, only revealing themselves in the dark. Similar to the Sonny Angel or other blind box lines, each series comes with several variants, as well as a secret variant. Unlike the Sonny Angel figurines, Dreams Inc. aimed to expand their target audience, which at the time mostly consisted of 25-35 aged women. Smiskis' "gender-neutral" appearance seems to be appealing to both women and men. As of 2025, there were 18 different Smiski series.

In 2025, the Smiski Hippers series was released, unveiling several figures that can attach to objects as opposed to freely standing. They attach using an adhesive feature that allows them to stick to objects like laptops, picture frames, and desks. Also in 2025, Smiskis marked their 10th anniversary with the release of a new series titled Birthday Series. Other Smiski products include a Smiski Touch Light, a Smiski Toothbrush Stand, and Smiski Strap Accessories. A Smiski mascot has also regularly appeared at several toy store events and meetups around the world.

== Design ==
Smiskis each range about 2.5 to 3 inches tall. In general, each series has about six regular designs and one secret figure, for a total of seven different activities per series.

== Series ==
There are 18 series in total: Birthday Series, Sunday Series, HIPPERS, Moving Series, Exercising Series, Dressing Series, @ Work Series, Museum Series, Cheer Series, Yoga Series, Bed Series, Living Series, Bath Series, Toilet Series, Series 4, Series 3, Series 2, and Series 1. Series 2, 3, and 4 however, have been discontinued.

== Sales ==
As of 2025, individual Smiski blind boxes are typically priced at approximately USD $12–13, while assorted boxes containing twelve blind boxes are generally sold for about USD $150. Each series includes a secret figurine, which is produced in low quantities and is estimated to appear at a rate of roughly 1 in 144 boxes. These rare variants spark collector interest and have contributed to a secondary market in which secret Smiski figures are resold on platforms such as eBay at higher prices, though overall resale activity remains lower compared to higher-value blind-box brands such as Sonny Angel.

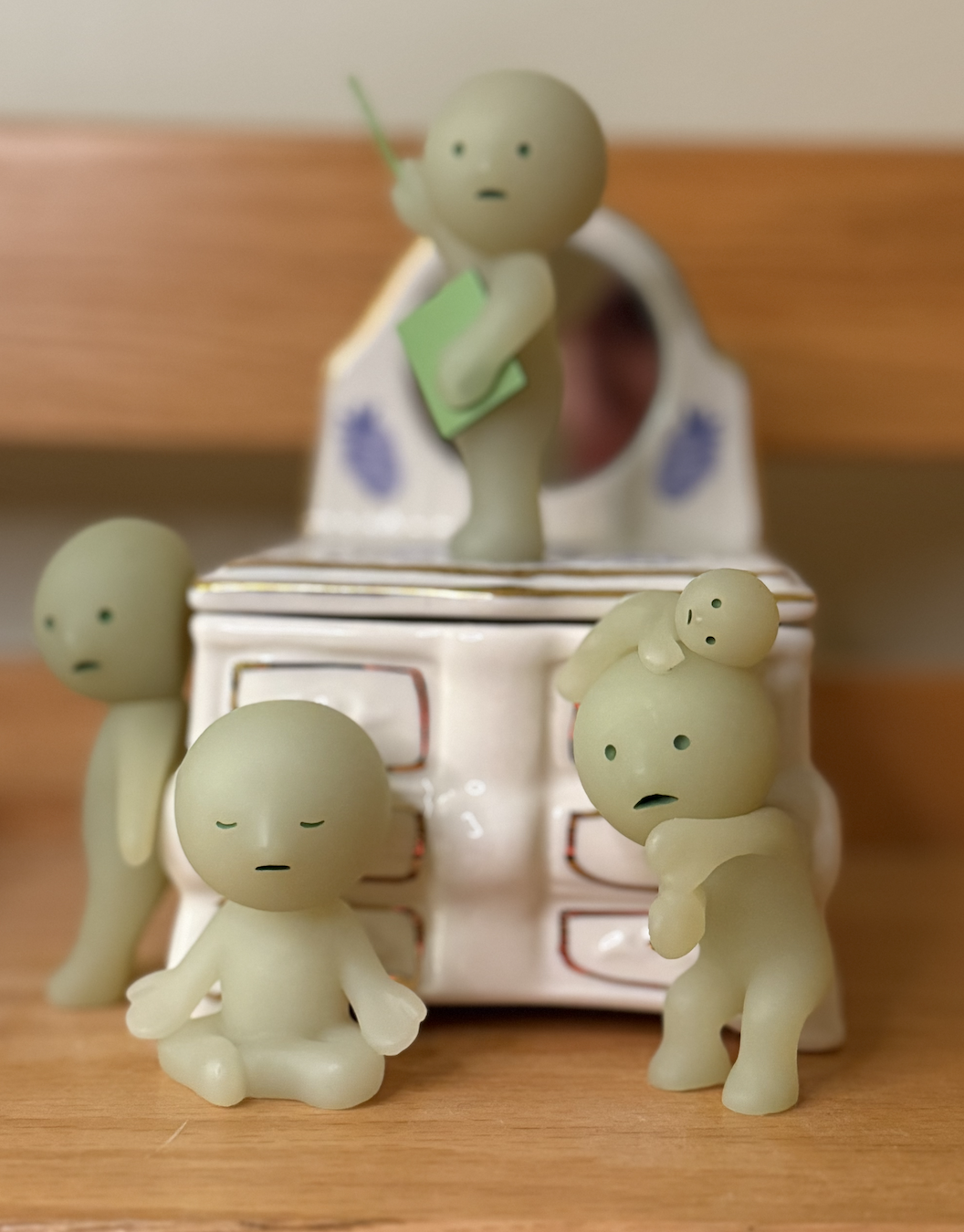
A group of Smiskis from various series

== Cultural impact ==
While many blind box figures have been around for decades, new communities and cultures have formed around collecting and trading them in the 2020s. Such a trend has been observed all throughout Asia, the United States, and parts of Europe. Like Sonny Angels, as well as other collectibles like Labubus, Smiskis have become popular with Generation Z and have gone viral through social media platforms like TikTok and Instagram. For example, many TikTok and Instagram creators display their Smiski collections on shelves or in miniature dollhouse setups. It is also common for creators to post “unboxing videos” for new Smiskis, which has become widely viewed on these platforms. This trend has increased the appeal of products like Smiski, which has been shown to increase emotional value, social value, and perceived luck of consumers, each factor increasing consumers’ likelihood of repurchasing them.
