= Wang Ning =

Wang Ning is the name of:

- Wang Ning (general) (born 1955), commander of the People's Armed Police
- Wang Ning (politician, born 1961), Communist party secretary of Yunnan
- Wang Ning (politician, born 1966), former politician, Party Secretary of Liulin County
- Wang Ning (news anchor) (born 1964), former Chinese news anchor
- Wang Ning (businessman) (born 1987), founder of Pop Mart
- Wang Ning (volleyball) (born 1994), Chinese volleyball player
- Wang Ning (linguist), Chinese linguist
