= Hot Pixel =

2007 video game

- Hot Pixel European cover art
- Developer: zSlide
- Publishers: Atari (NA); SCEE (EU); Konami (JP)
- Platform: PlayStation Portable
- Release: EU: 22 June 2007; NA: 2 October 2007; JP: 4 October 2007
- Genre: Puzzle
- Mode: Single Player

Hot Pixel is a puzzle video game for the Sony PlayStation Portable developed by French studio zSlide, released on 22 June 2007 in Europe and 2 October 2007 in the North America by Atari.

== Gameplay ==
Hot Pixel is composed of minigames. It consists of 10 stages, each representing young suburban culture. Some of these games are based on Atari properties from the 1980s including coin-op and home-based video games. Some minigames are copies of classics such as Breakout and Space Invaders.

== Reception ==
Reception

Aggregate score
Aggregator	Score
Metacritic	55/100

Review scores
Publication	Score
GameZone	5.0/10
IGN	4.9/10
The Next Level	2.5/5
Worthplaying	7.0/10

The game received mixed reviews from critics. Jeff Gerstmann of GameSpot gave Hot Pixel 6.5 out of 10 criticizing misleading advertisement of 200+ minigames and its close resemblance to WarioWare series, but praising the fact that it's a rather good clone of the game. Pocket Gamer gave a game 6 out of 10 criticizing its variety and shortness but praised its presentation and its resemblance of various classical arcade games such as Arkanoid, Battlezone and Asteroids. GameZone, on the other hand, compared it to Work Time Fun, but said that unlike that game this one have over 200 minigames and is fun (especially the one that resembles Breakout).
