= Sonny Angel =

Japanese collectible figurines

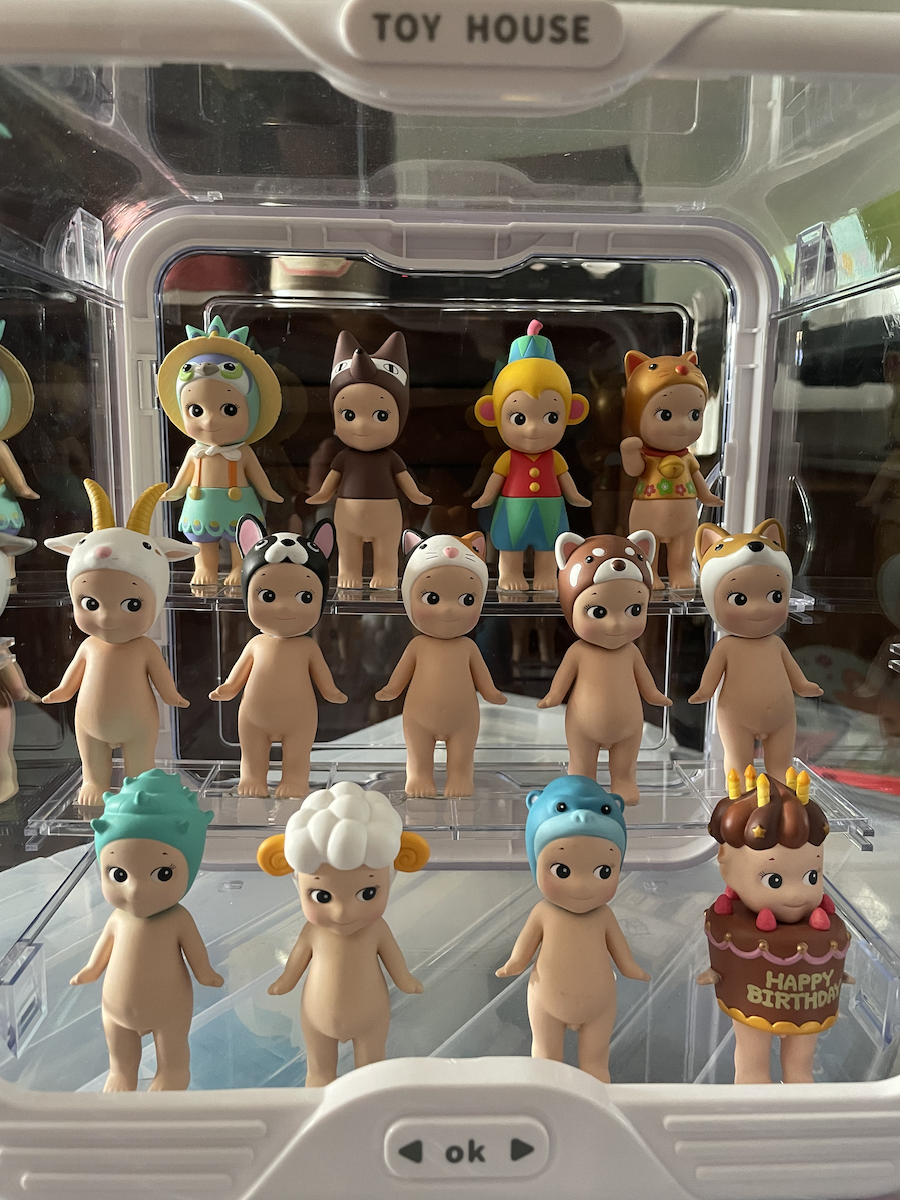
- A display case of Sonny Angel figurines featuring the Donna Wilson collaboration, Carnival, and Animal Series
- Type: Toy figurines
- Invented by: Toru Soeya
- Company: Dreams Inc.
- Country: Japan
- Availability: May 15, 2004–Present
- Slogan: "He may bring you happiness."
- Official website

Sonny Angel is a line of cherub figurines created by Japanese toy manufacturer Toru Soeya, the CEO of the Japanese company, Dreams Inc. The name is derived from Soeya's nickname, 'Sonny'. The company also produces many other popular figurines, such as "Smiski" dolls and "Cable Bites." Sonny Angels are sold in blind boxes, with figures featuring different headgear and occasionally different outfits in various collections. The slogan of Sonny Angel is, "he may bring you more happiness."

Sonny Angels are often purchased as collectibles, and are especially known for their high resale prices, even though their original retail cost is relatively cheap. Many figurines are resold for far more than their initial price and are often exchanged or resold at trading events and online resale platforms. Towards the end of 2019, over 20 million units were sold worldwide, and sales have only continued to increase.

== Origins ==
Sonny Angel was launched on May 15, 2004. The figurine started as an 18-centimeter (7-inch) doll and was largely inspired by the miniature, cherub-like character Kewpie, which was first created in 1909. Sonny was later transformed into a 7-centimeter (3-inch) mini figure and is now sold in over 33 countries. "Animal Series Ver. 1," featuring the figurines dressed up in animal hats, was the first official mini figure series sold.

Sonny Angel was first designed to offer comfort to young working women in Japan during a time of economic uncertainty, instead of being designed for children. The figurines were released during Japan's mild recession, which eventually got worse during the 2008 financial crisis. Due to their origins in Japan, the figurines are known as "Healing Dolls," intended to bring brightness and comfort into one's daily life.

The Sonny Angel figurines are sold as blind boxes, a category of collectible product that makes the contents of the package a mystery until it is opened. The concept of the blind box originated commercially in the 1980s, inspired by the Japanese tradition of "Fukubukuro", which translates to "good luck bag". The blind box industry originated in the 1990s in Japanese department stores with collectible cards. With a concurrent rise in the popularity of fashion toys, the industry attracted further investment and gained attention from both merchants and investors. Early versions of the blind box concept were seen in Gashapon toys, where small blind-box capsule toys were dispensed through vending machines.

== Media ==
Sonny Angel figurines grew in popularity on TikTok, where the hashtag "#sonnyangel" gathered over 95 million views as of April 2023. In these short TikTok videos, people would create videos that showed unboxings, fan art, purchase hauls, and meetups with other Sonny Angel fans. The viral nature of the figurine, in addition to the publicized scarcity of certain variants has increased consumer demand.

The New York Times covered a Sonny Angel figurines event on April 6, 2023, where 150 people met in Washington Square Park to buy, sell, and trade the dolls with other enthusiasts.

Sonny Angels was featured on a Saturday Night Live sketch on May 4 2024, where Marcello Hernández, Dua Lipa and Bowen Yang performed a Challengers-themed sketch about the craze surrounding the figurines. In the sketch, Yang played a Sonny Angel fighting Hernández's character to win the romantic attention of Lipa, a Sonny Angel collector.

Celebrities such as Bella Hadid, Victoria Beckham, Lana Del Rey, and Rosalía have been seen with Sonny Angel figurines, contributing to their visibility beyond dedicated collectors.

== Collaborations ==
=== Donna Wilson ===
In June 2022, Sonny Angel partnered with London-based textile artist Donna Wilson to create the "Creature Series". This collaboration introduced 12 mini figurines and one secret figurine which were each wrapped in cottage-shaped blind boxes.

=== KEMElife ===
In July 2022, Sonny Angel collaborated with KEMElife, an art toy brand, to develop the "Everything Have Souls" series, featuring a rabbit and a tiger, which symbolizes innocence and bravery, respectively, in Chinese folklore.

=== Casetify ===
In July 2024, Sonny Angel collaborated with Casetify, an accessories brand, to offer phone cases and accessories, inspired by the Sonny Angel Harvest Series, with fruit and vegetable motifs. The collection was released on July 19, 2024, and included items such as the Sonny Angel x CASETiFY Heart Metal Phone Strap and a limited-edition blind box containing a Harvest Heart Series Case and matching Sonny Angel Hipper.

== Sales ==
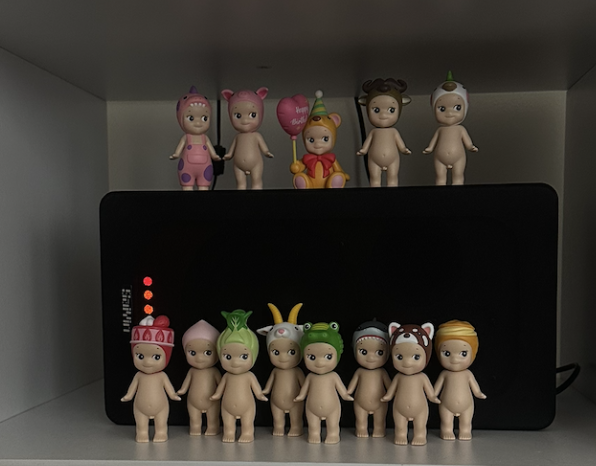
Collection of Sonny Angels, including figurines from Dinosaur Series, Animal Series 3, and Sweets Series collections

Sonny Angel figurines are typically priced between US$10 and US$12 each depending on the series and retailer. These figurines fit into the "lipstick index" theory, which makes buyers more inclined to purchase them since it's under $20 and a "luxury" item in times of economic struggle. Some popular Sonny Angel series include "Hippers - Harvest Series", "Animal 4 Series", "Marine Series", and "Hippers Looking Back Series". Additionally, Sonny Angel releases seasonal series related to holidays such as Valentine's Day and Christmas.

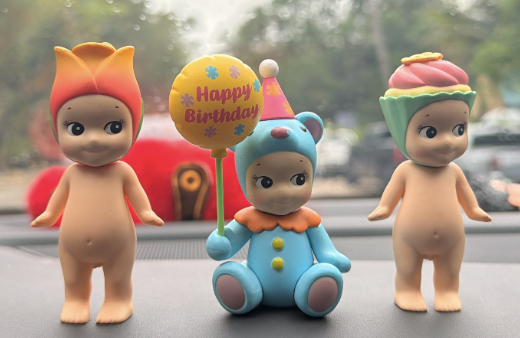
The image features the Tulip figurine from the Flower Series, the Birthday Gift Bear mini figure from the 2021 Limited Edition series, and the Cupcake figurine from the Sweets Series

Limited-edition releases have created a resale market where certain figurines can command prices significantly above retail, driven by collector demand and scarcity. On online platforms such as eBay and Depop, rare figurines are often resold at higher prices, with some reaching up to ten times the original cost. For example, "secret" figurines (called Robbys) can sell for up to $250 on eBay. Some limited edition series consist of the Santa's Little Helper Series, the Pumpkin Patch Series, the Harvest Series, the Looking Back Series, and the Garden Hippers.

Trading among collectors through events that are organized by Sonny Angel consumers is common. Collectors often seek specific figures to finish a series, or acquire rare editions. Some Sonny Angel enthusiasts are sellers and can sell anywhere between 500 and 1,000 Sonny Angels per week.

Sales of Sonny Angels increased in late 2024 and brought in revenue of over $5 million dollars for the brand.

== Secret figurines ==
Each series includes 12 different figurines from the regular set. The secret figurines are extremely rare and only show up randomly, which makes them the most desirable to collect. Also, certain editions are produced in very limited quantities, sometimes as few as 10, 50, or 100 total.

=== Robby Angel ===
Along with the regular and secret figurines of the set, there are additional secret figurines named "Robby." Robby is a highly sought-after, "secret" figure of an unspecified animal species. He is said to be "best friends" with Sonny Angel. Robby changes his appearance according to which series he is found in. As of March 2025, the secret Robby from the 2023 Cat Life Series is selling for prices up to $299.

== Cultural impact ==
=== Youth appeal ===
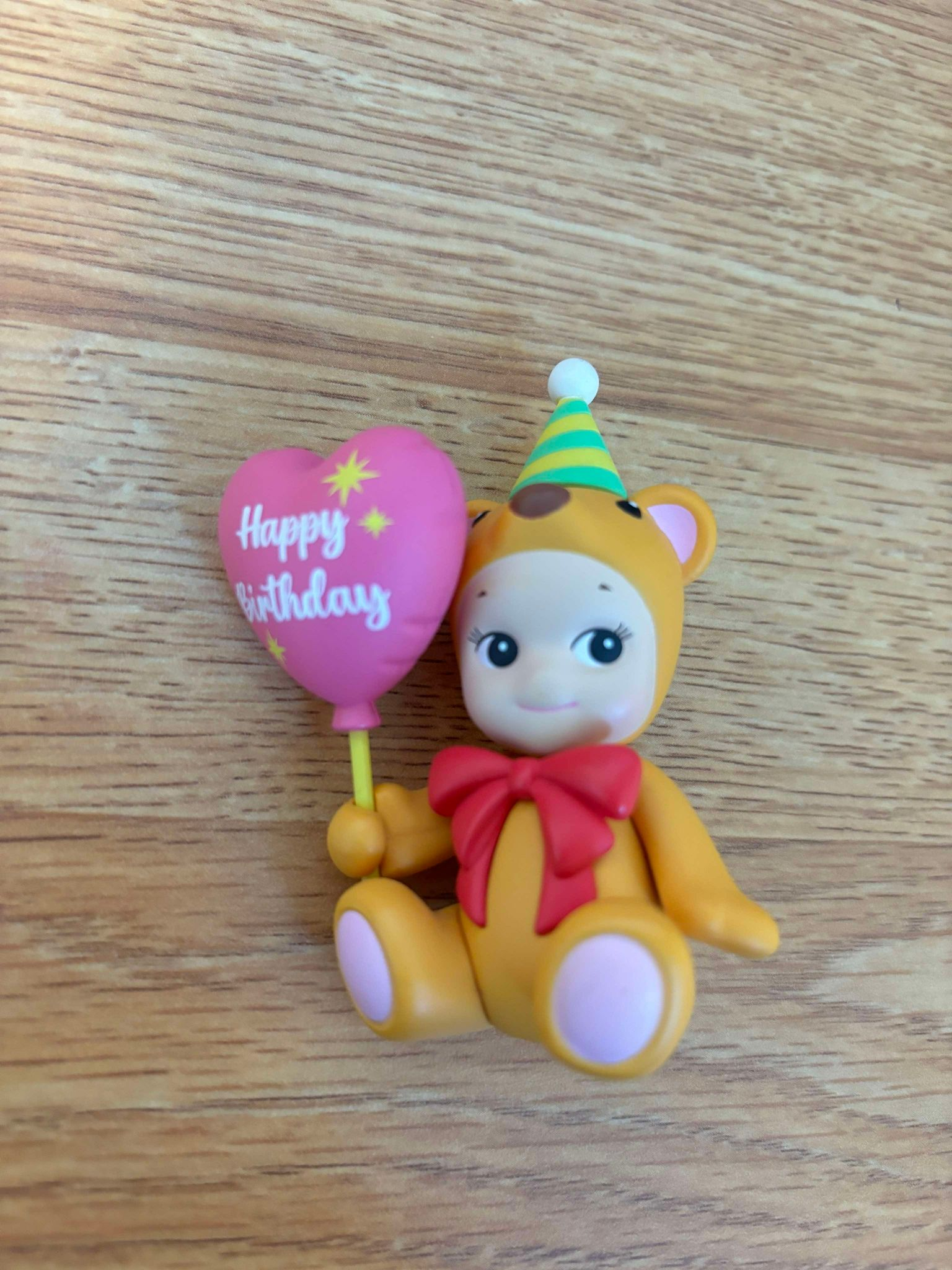
A Sonny Angel figurine from the "Birthday Series," wearing a bear costume, party hat, and holding a pink heart-shaped balloon

Most fans of Sonny Angels are members of Generation Z or Generation Alpha. The collectible figurines have been heavily featured on social media platforms including TikTok, resulting in a massive supply shortage amongst the brands' 441 authorized retailers. Due to the increase in popularity, they've expanded by releasing phone and laptop accessories.

Some attribute mental health benefits to the figurines, as some claim that the dolls provide comfort and nostalgia for one's childhood. Some also claim that the dolls provide emotionally isolated college students with a sense of personal connection and companionship. Owning a Sonny Angel has ties to self-expression and individuality, which can make someone feel more connected to themself.

The affordability of the figures may be part of the appeal to Gen Z fans and Gen Alpha fans, enabling consumers to build sizable collections.
