= Wang Ning (businessman) =

Chinese businessman (born 1987)

- 王宁
- Born: 1987 (age 38–39); Huojia County, Henan, China
- Education: Sias University (BA), Guanghua School of Management (MBA), PBC School of Finance (EMBA)
- Occupation: Businessman
- Title: Founder and CEO of Pop Mart

Wang Ning (Chinese: 王宁, born 1987) is a Chinese businessman. He is the CEO of Pop Mart, a Chinese toy company he founded in 2010. As of February 2026, Wang has an estimated net worth of US$19.6 billion, according to Forbes.

== Early life and education ==
Wang was born in 1987 in Huojia County, Henan, China. His parents ran a small commerce business.

He was graduated from Sias University in 2009 with an undergraduate degree in advertising. Wang earned an MBA from Peking University's Guanghua School of Management in 2017.

== Career ==
After graduating in 2009, Wang worked a year at Sina Corporation.

Taking inspiration from Gashapon vending machines in Japan, Wang founded Pop Mart in 2010 as a variety store in Zhongguancun, Beijing. Over the years, he began to develop toy lines in partnership with artists, including the Hong Kong-based Kenny Wong.

In December 2020, Pop Mart went public on the Hong Kong Stock Exchange.

As of December 31, 2024, Wang held approximately 48.73% of Pop Mart’s issued shares through controlled corporations and a trust.

Pop Mart gained widespread attention in 2023 with the popularity of the Labubu toy line, which has since been endorsed by several celebrities, including Blackpink's Lisa. As a result, Wang became China's 10th richest individual in June 2025.

== See also ==
- Pop Mart
