= Labubu =

Line of collectible plush toys

- Labubu The Monsters Exciting Macaron series from 2023
- Other names: 拉布布 (Chinese)
- Type: Plush toy
- Invented by: Kasing Lung
- Company: How2Work (2015–2019); Pop Mart (2019–present)
- Availability: 2015–present

Labubu (/lɑːˈbuːbu/ lah-BOO-boo; Chinese: 拉布布; pinyin: Lābùbù) is a line of collectible plush toys created by Hong Kong illustrator Kasing Lung. The series features zoomorphic elves with exaggerated facial expressions, of which the central figure is Labubu, a monster with sharp teeth, large ears and a scruffy appearance.

The toys are produced and sold exclusively by the China-based retailer Pop Mart, which primarily releases Labubu figures in sealed "blind box" packaging that conceals the specific character inside. Over time, the series expanded to include different versions of Labubu and other related figures, often released in limited runs or as part of themed sets.

Labubu toys gained significant popularity across East and Southeast Asia in 2024, establishing Labubu as one of Pop Mart's signature characters and a central figure in the global blind box collecting trend. The character has also inspired collaborations with fashion brands and limited-edition art figures. Academic research has examined consumer behavior surrounding the Labubu series, particularly in relation to scarcity-based marketing strategies.

By late 2026, demand had fallen sharply, with Pop Mart reporting a 45–50% year-on-year drop in third-quarter revenue.

== History ==
Labubu began as a character designed by Kasing Lung (born 1972), a Hong Kong-born artist raised in Utrecht, Netherlands. Labubu was part of Lung's story series The Monsters, which was influenced by Nordic folklore and mythology that he enjoyed during his childhood.

Labubu was introduced in 2015 with "Monsters" figurines produced by the company How2Work; the toy gained wider recognition in 2019 following a collaboration with Pop Mart. This partnership boosted Labubu's popularity among collectors.

By 2025, the brand had released over 300 different Labubu figurines, ranging in size and price, from US$15 for an eight-centimetre (3 in) vinyl figure to $960 for a 79-centimetre (31 in) "mega" edition. In June 2025, a 1.2-metre-tall (4 ft) mint-green Labubu was sold for $170,000 at the first official Labubu auction, held in Beijing. An anime adaptation of 156 short episodes in a 7-minute time slot was planned for broadcast in 2025.

Pop Mart CEO Wang Ning's 48.73% stake in the company has secured a US$21.1 billion fortune as of 7 July 2025 (up from $1.8 billion in 2024), making him the youngest member of China's top ten billionaire list at 38–39.

=== Film ===
In November 2025, Sony Pictures acquired rights to develop a film based on Labubu. Paul King was announced as the film's director in December 2025. In March 2026, Steven Levenson (Dear Evan Hansen) was announced to be co-writing the film alongside King.

== Design ==
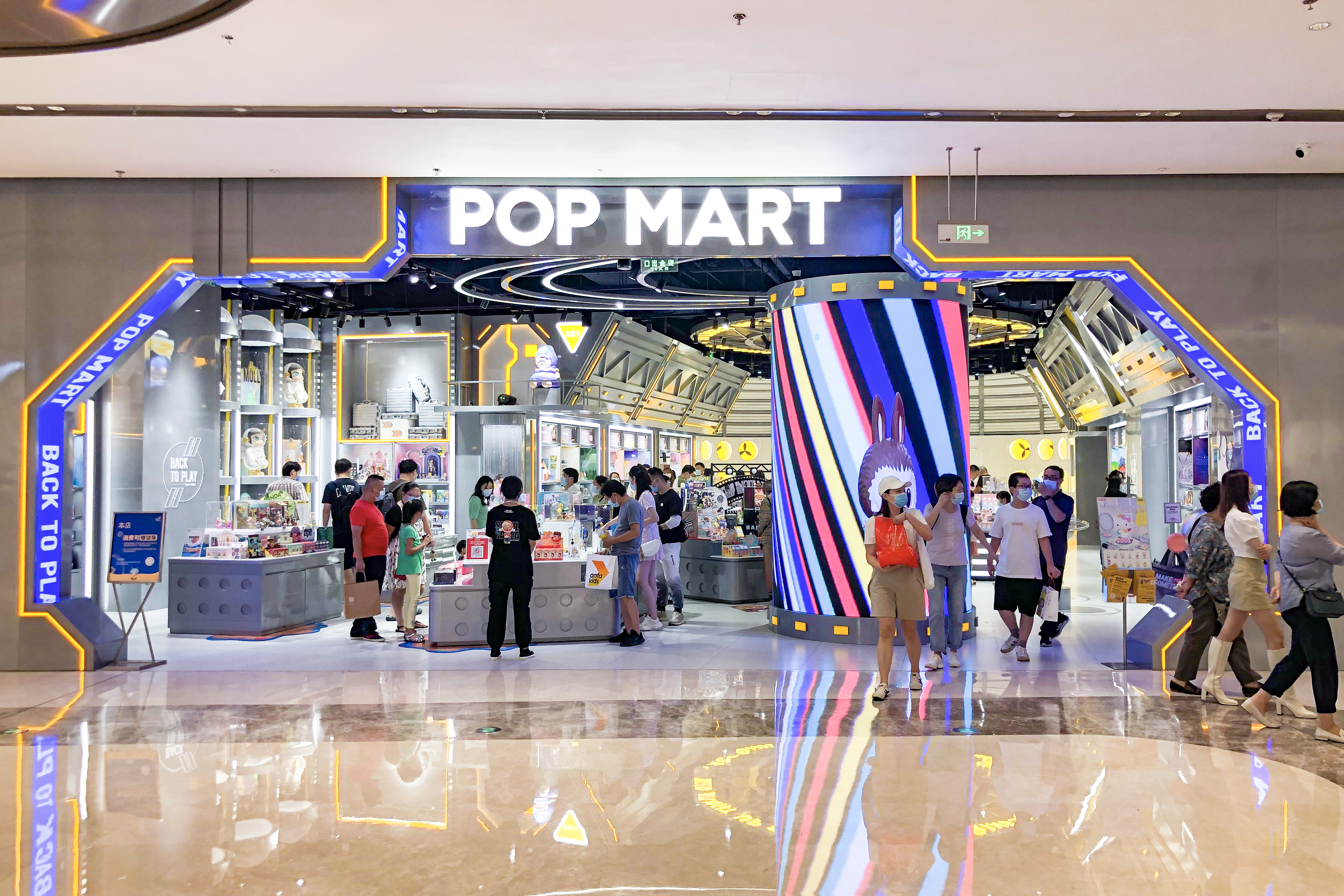
Labubu dolls have been sold by Pop Mart since 2019.

Labubus are described as having a playful yet slightly fierce look, featuring round, furry bodies, wide eyes, pointed ears, and nine sharp teeth that form a mischievous smile. Aside from Labubu herself, other figures also belong to a "tribe" called "The Monsters", including the characters Mokoko, Pato, Spooky, Tycoco (Labubu's "skeleton-looking" boyfriend), and Zimomo (the leader of The Monsters, with a spiked tail). The dolls have been produced with a variety of appearances.

The first Labubu key-ring line, titled "Exciting Macaron" (Chinese: 心動馬卡龍), was released in October 2023. Other collections include "Fall in Wild", the seven-figurine "Have a Seat" (Chinese: 坐坐派對) line, and "Massive into Energy" (Chinese: 大動力系列).

Pop Mart has also collaborated with various brands, producing a Coca-Cola–themed winter blind box series of eleven Labubus in late 2024 and a 13-figurine line of The Monsters re-imagined as characters from the manga One Piece in early 2025. Other figures have been released exclusively at various museums, such as the "Labubu's Artistic Quest" series sold at Pop Mart's store at the Louvre in Paris.

=== Blind boxes ===
Labubu figures are often sold in blind boxes, collected into themed lines, which contain a toy chosen at random from that series. Series often contain a rare "secret" figure in addition to the designs advertised.

== Popularity and public issues ==
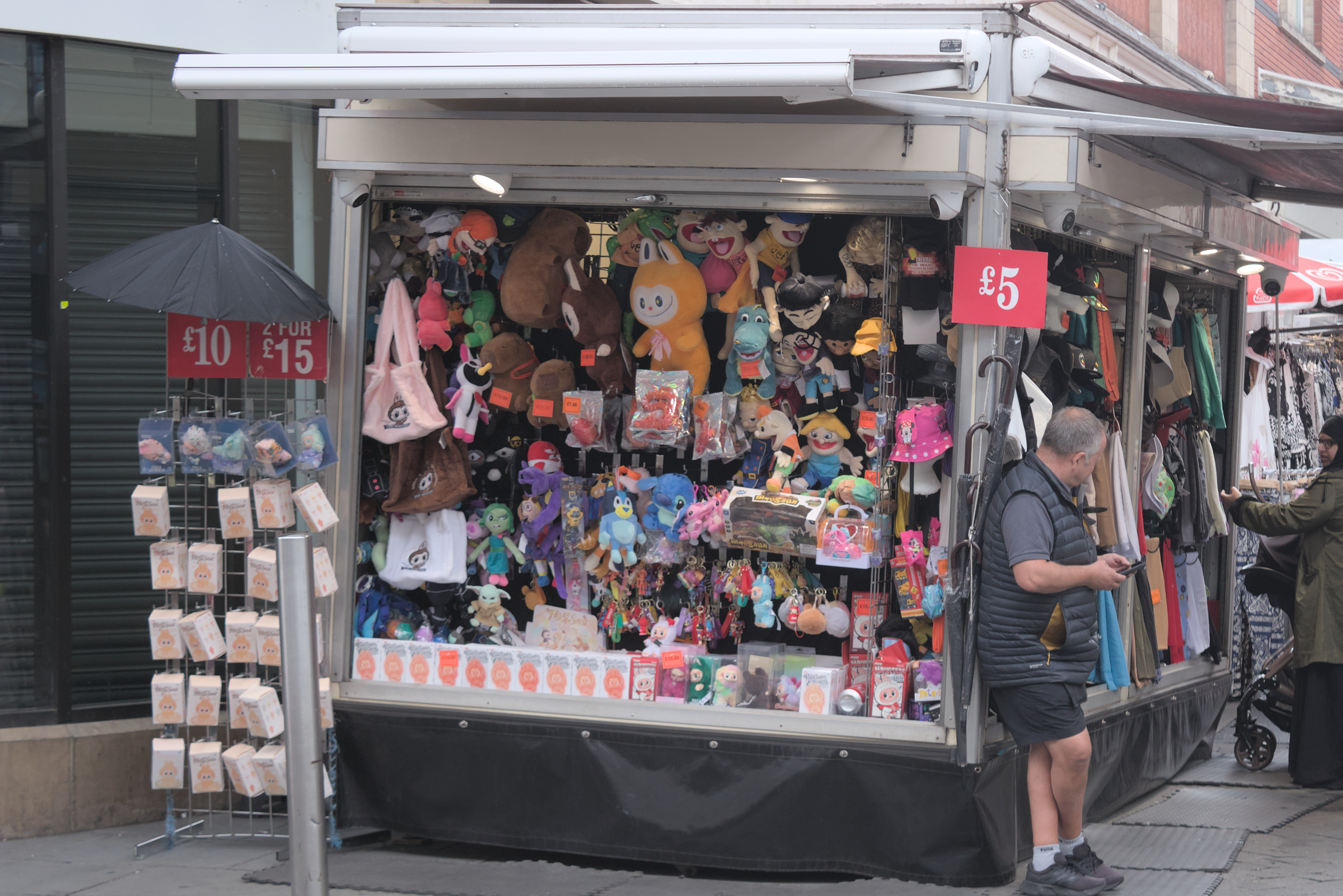
A stand in Nottingham selling counterfeit Labubu toys, among other brands

The toy gained widespread attention in April 2024 after K-pop group Blackpink member Lisa was spotted with a keychain Labubu on her bag. This sparked a trend that quickly contributed to its growing recognition in Thailand and other parts of Southeast and East Asia. Labubus have also received endorsements from celebrities such as Rihanna and Cher, and have been used in promotional efforts for unrelated films, with actors like Javier Bardem interacting with the toys as part of marketing campaigns.

In 2025, New York magazine's Liza Corsillo wrote that the "toy's appeal is fueled by a hard-to-explain cuteness—they're kind of ugly, but huggable, with a devilish grin—as well as surprise and scarcity." Corsillo also wrote that, like Jellycat, Labubus blur "the line between toys and fashion".

Demand for Labubus has been high enough to crash the website on at least one occasion. Due to the brand's popularity, counterfeit versions, sometimes colloquially referred to as "Lafufus", have appeared in the market. Counterfeit accessories are also available for purchase online. Some collectors have reportedly also taken interest in these fakes, due to their unconventional designs.

Pop Mart's 2024 interim report, released on 20 August, stated that the line generated sales of 6.3 billion Chinese yuan (approximately US$870 million) in the first half of the year.

In May 2025, Pop Mart announced it had paused selling Labubus in all 16 of its stores in the United Kingdom until June to "prevent any potential safety issues" following multiple reports of customers fighting over them.

The Federation Council of Russia proposed banning the sale of Labubus. The reason was their "frightening appearance" and potential harm to children's mental health. In Russia, Ekaterina Altabaeva, deputy chair of the Committee on Science, Education and Culture, stated that the figures cause children to feel fear. She called on Rospotrebnadzor and Rosobrnadzor to consider banning them. Tatyana Butskaya, first deputy chair of the State Duma Committee on Family Protection, reported that Labubus were being sold in Russia in violation of regulations: according to her, there was not a single word in Russian on the toys, and the marking did not indicate that they were manufactured in Russia.

In July 2025, authorities in Iraq's Kurdistan Region announced they had banned the sale of the doll due to claims that they resulted in behavioral problems in children. Authorities also seized at least 4,000 dolls in the Erbil area, following media reports of the dolls also containing 'demonic spirits'.

The New York Times noted the widespread cultural presence of Labubu toys, describing them as "adorable furry monsters with sharp teeth" and comparing their chaotic-cute appeal to popular film characters like Stitch (Lilo & Stitch) and Toothless (How to Train Your Dragon). The article credited Labubu with influencing the season's surge in cute sidekick characters across major studio films.

== Cultural impact ==
=== Thai amulets ===
In 2024, due to the viral popularity of Labubu in Thailand, many Thais began to believe that its image could bring wealth and good fortune. As a result, it was made into Buddhist amulets and sacred tattoos.

=== Political promotion ===
In September 2024, the People's Action Party (PAP) Sengkang team in Singapore held a grocery distribution event for senior citizens at Compassvale Crescent, Sengkang. During the event, a Labubu plush keychain dressed in a white shirt bearing the PAP logo was introduced. Lam Pin Min, chairman of the PAP Sengkang West branch, shared photos on social media of the doll participating in the event, describing it as the team's "latest and cutest volunteer". The doll appeared in the group's official photo and featured in a subsequent TikTok video.

=== Nine Emperor Gods Festival ===
In October 2024, during the Nine Emperor Gods Festival, Singapore's Ling Lian Bao Dian Temple introduced collectible toy elements for the first time to attract younger generations to traditional religious practices. Four Labubu figurines, dressed in white clothes, white hats, and yellow sashes, participated throughout the festivities. This initiative drew widespread attention and sparked debate on social media. While some praised the idea as cute and culturally innovative, others questioned whether it was disrespectful to the deities. The temple clarified that the toys were merely acting as "devotees" and were not being worshipped as offerings; therefore, no disrespect was intended. Videos of the event garnered high viewership on social media, drawing many young people to the temple to see the figurines in person.

=== Psychological concerns and bans ===
In 2025, members of the Federation Council in Russia, including Ekaterina Altabaeva and Tatiana Butskaya, proposed banning Labubu dolls. They cited the doll's "terrifying appearance" and its potential negative influence on children's mental health, alongside the lack of Russian language labeling on packaging. Similarly, authorities in the Kurdistan Region of Iraq seized over 4,000 Labubu dolls and imposed a ban, alleging that the toy could influence children's behavior and attract demonic spirits. Labubu has been associated with conspiracy theories linking it to the ancient Mesopotamian demon Pazuzu, primarily due to its sharp-toothed grin and eerie aesthetic. These theories gained popularity on platforms like TikTok and Reddit, with some users claiming supernatural experiences and even destroying their dolls in public. Pakistani actress Mishi Khan also voiced concern, warning that the dolls may attract negative spiritual energy or jinn. Designers and cultural analysts, however, have dismissed these claims, stating that the character draws from European folklore and does not contain occult symbolism.

=== Marketing criticism and overconsumption ===
Labubu is sold using a blind box model, which has been criticized for encouraging overconsumption and emotional dependency through artificial scarcity. Critics argue that this approach leads to obsessive collecting, financial exploitation, and the promotion of materialist values. Some editorials have referred to the fan culture surrounding Labubu as a reflection of modern consumer idolatry.

=== Counterfeits and quality concerns ===
The popularity of Labubu has led to widespread counterfeiting. Imitation dolls, often called "Lafufu", have been sold globally, prompting legal action by Pop Mart, including a lawsuit against 7-Eleven in California for selling counterfeit toys. Generally, fake Labubus have invalid, blurry QR codes on the box and lack Pop Mart branding. Additionally, many fake Labubus have more than 9 teeth. Concerns have also been raised about dolls that contain Xinjiang cotton prohibited under the Uyghur Forced Labor Prevention Act.

=== South Park episode ===
In 2025, a South Park episode titled "Wok Is Dead" featured the dolls, which, in the show, become more expensive due to Donald Trump's tariffs. In the episode, the dolls are also used for Satanic rituals.

=== FIFA ===
Labubu appeared at the Mexican part of the 2026 FIFA World Cup opening ceremony as part of a collaboration with FIFA, which involved a collection including doll-related accessories.

== Decline in sales ==
In October 2026, Pop Mart reported that its revenue for the third quarter of 2026 had fallen by 45–50% year-on-year, according to a filing with the Hong Kong Stock Exchange. The decline was steepest overseas: revenue fell by 70–75% in the Americas, 65–70% in the Asia-Pacific, and 50–55% in Europe and other regions, compared with 25–30% in mainland China. The results were weaker than the 30% decline that analysts had estimated, although broadly in line with the expectations of institutional investors, according to Jefferies. Pop Mart's shares had declined by more than 30% in 2026 up to that point, and fell by more than 6% in early trading on 28 October. Jefferies cut its earnings estimates for 2027 and 2028 by 9–12%, citing pressure on profitability from weaker overseas sales, and projected that fourth-quarter revenue would remain 34% below the level of the previous year.

Pop Mart continued to expand its global store network, focusing on flagship locations in cities such as New York, Milan and Paris, while promoting other characters including Skullpanda, Hirono and Twinkle Twinkle.

== See also ==
- Beanie Babies – American brand of stuffed toys
- Hello Kitty – Fictional character by Sanrio
  - List of Sanrio characters
- Monchhichi – Line of Japanese stuffed animal toys
- Natasha doll – Stress relief toy
- Pet Rock – Toy in 1970s
- Sonny Angel – Japanese collectible figurines
- Sylvanian Families – Line of collectible animal figurines
- Troll doll – Type of plastic doll with furry up-combed hair
- Uglydoll – Plush toys
