= Kasing Lung =

Hong Kong designer (born 1972)

- 龍家昇
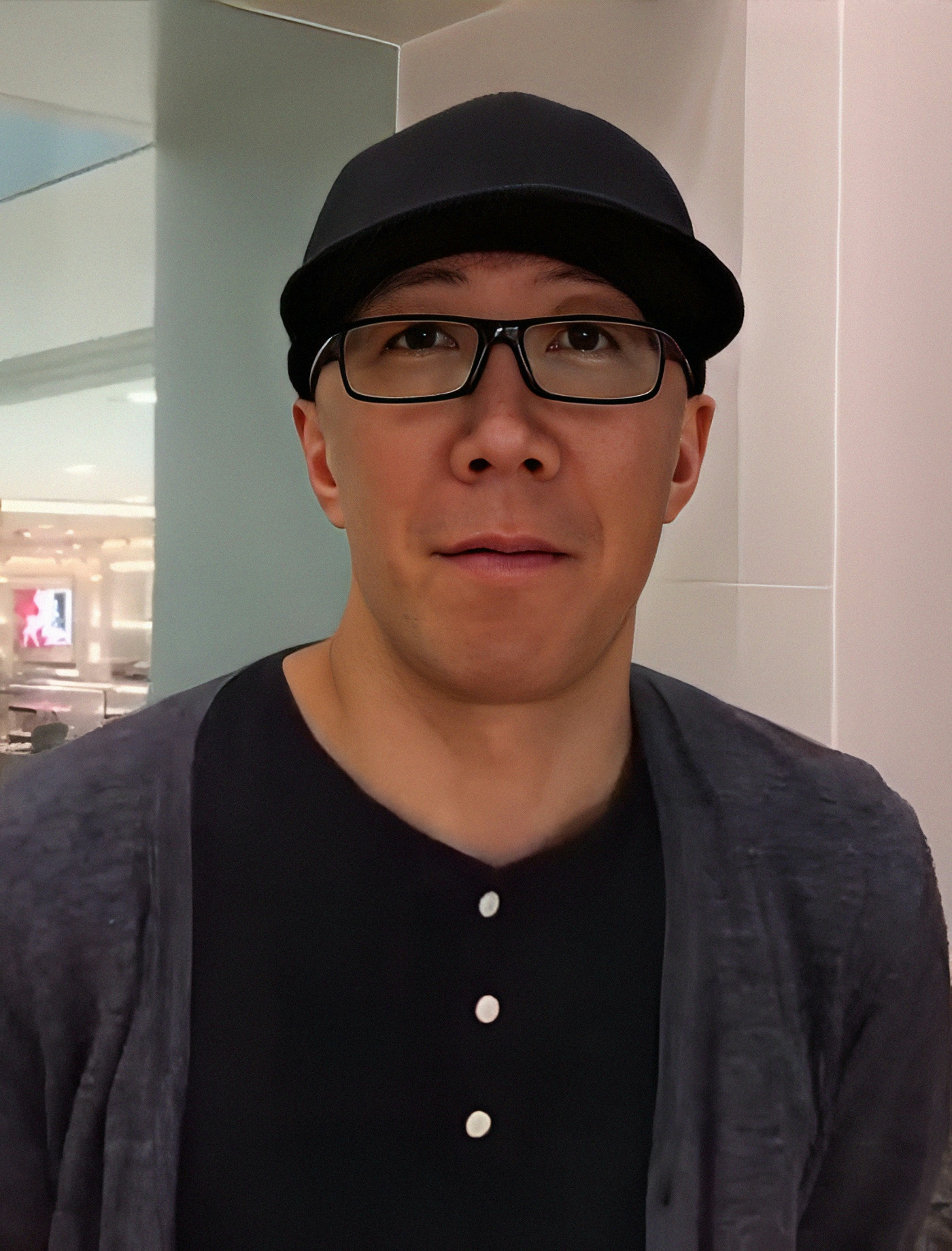
- Lung in 2017
- Born: Lung Ka Sing; December 31, 1972 (age 53); British Hong Kong
- Education: Bachelor of Arts
- Alma mater: Chung Sing School
- Known for: Drawing, Illustration
- Notable work: Labubu / The "Monsters" series
- Style: Whimsical creations influenced by Nordic mythology
- Children: 1

Signature
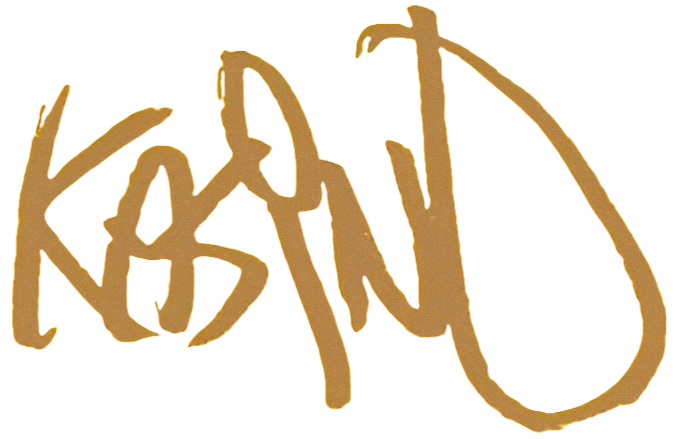

Kasing Lung (born December 31, 1972) is a Hong Kong illustrator and toy designer best known as the creator of Labubu, sold by the brand Pop Mart, which he originally introduced as a character in his series The Monsters. Lung has achieved global recognition with his release of over 300 different versions of the Labubu character. Inspired by folklore and Nordic myths, his work includes figurative toy designs, paintings and solo exhibitions.

== Early life ==
Kasing Lung was born in Hong Kong in December 1972. His ancestors were indigenous inhabitants of a village in Yuen Long. In the 1960s, his parents emigrated to Utrecht, where they ran a Chinese catering business. Lung returned to Hong Kong, where he lived with his grandparents in Yuen Long. He studied at Chung Sing School until primary 2, learning Chinese and eventually acquiring a Hong Kong identity card.

In 1978, he moved back to the Netherlands with his family, but lacking proficiency in Dutch, he fell behind in school and had to return to group 1. In order to improve his Dutch, a teacher suggested that he read young adult books with illustrations (especially about Nordic folklore and mythology). He also continued practicing his Chinese by reading martial arts and chivalry (wuxia) novels by Jin Yong.

His mother encouraged him to watch more films, theatre plays and musicals with his siblings. Lung also became a keen collector of vinyl records by artists like Leslie Cheung, Leonard Cohen, Radiohead and The Beatles. Though he took an interest in film studies, he chose to pursue a Bachelor of Arts degree that encompassed design, photography, publishing and sculpture at an art institute for financial reasons. Lung has stated that his upbringing influences his artistic style.

== Career ==
After Lung graduated from the art institute in 1995, he returned to Hong Kong to become an illustrator, working with Culturecom, an advertising agency and technology website, until 2003. Due to a SARS epidemic causing Hong Kong's economic stagnation, Lung went back to live with his girlfriend in Belgium. He began to engage in filmmaking and book illustration with De Eenhoorn. He became the first Chinese winner of the Illustration Award via "Mama is Weg" in the same year.

Since 2010, Lung has transitioned from an illustrator to a toy designer. He began a first collaboration with the renowned Hong Kong art toy brand How2Work in Taiwan, jointly designing a collectible series of finger puppets called "a Toys foresT" and their illustrated storybooks. However, when products were not selling well within 3 years, he was given encouragement from his wife, colleague, and Howard Lee, founder of How2Work, giving up on job hunting in Belgium. Afterwards, Lung published an illustration titled LiTTLE PLANET NETWORK through the Milk Magazine, also releasing his first Mandarin illustration book titled My Little Planet. In 2014, he cooperated with children's book writer Brigitte Minne and launched their multilingual series, Lizzy Wil Dansen. At the same time, Lung debuted a character called Labubu inspired by Nordic mythology, a series called The Monsters, and three fairy-themed pieces: The Story Of Puca (2015), Pato And The Girl (2016), and Milo's Requiem (2017) successively.

Because Labubu was successful in Taiwan markets, he decided to sell the product in Hong Kong starting in 2017. He organized "Solo exhibition: De Kleuren Monsters" before showing his artworks at different galleries. Two years later, Lung entered into exclusive license agreement with Pop Mart. They planned to extend the Labubu design across various platforms such as an official website, online marketplaces, offline stores, and advertisements, leading to the design's widespread recognition and significant market value. In 2024 Labubu figurines went viral among collectors and boosted collaborations across various brands. Lisa from the music group Blackpink has been known to showcase her collection of Labubu plush toys on social media, sparking a worldwide surge in demand and establishing the plush as a cultural trend. Lung gained fame as well. He maintains studios in both Antwerp and Kwun Tong.

== Works ==
External images
- Original Labubu
- Redesigned Labubu in 2019

=== Illustration books ===
- My Little Planet (November 12, 2013, Style, ISBN 978-986-306-120-5)
- Lizzy wil dansen (February 3, 2014, De Eenhoorn, ISBN 978-905-838-927-5)
- Lizzy leert zwemmen (February 16, 2015, De Eenhoorn, ISBN 978-946-291-004-1)
- Max is niet moe: Hij moet nog een hoge toren bouwen (February 16, 2015, De Eenhoorn, ISBN 978-946-291-005-8)
- Lizzy leert fietsen (August 14, 2015, De Eenhoorn, ISBN 978-946-291-041-6)
- The Story Of Puca (October 2015, How2Work, ISBN 978-986-306-120-5)
- Pato And The Girl (November 2016, How2Work)
- Milo's Requiem (November 2017, How2Work)
- The Wild Darkness (September 20, 2018, How2work)
- The Monsters Trilogy (March 30, 2019, How2Work)
