= Work Time Fun =

2005 video game

- Developer: Sony Computer Entertainment
- Publishers: JP: Sony Computer Entertainment; NA: D3 Publisher
- Platform: PlayStation Portable
- Release: JP: December 22, 2005; NA: September 26, 2006
- Genre: Action
- Modes: Single-player, multiplayer

Work Time Fun, known in Japan as Baito Hell 2000 (Note: Japanese: バイトヘル2000, Hepburn: Baito Heru Nisen; "Baito" being short for Arubaito, a Japanese loanword for "part-time job"), is a minigame compilation video game developed and published by Sony Computer Entertainment for the PlayStation Portable. The English title is a play on the slang "WTF", short for 'What The Fuck?', indicating distressing confusion. It was released in Japan on December 22, 2005, and in North America on September 26, 2006 by D3 Publisher. On October 2, 2008, it became available for download from the PlayStation Store.

The game's humor is derived from its satirical take on temporary or part-time employment. Players are paid a pittance for repetitive, menial tasks, with the only way to unlock more varied jobs being to grind through the boring ones. There is also an in-game email system, through which players can receive emails from fellow employees, award notices, and even spam offers which can decrease the player's funds.

== Gameplay ==
The game contains over forty minigames, representing inane part-time jobs the player receives from the "Job Demon", which must be completed in a certain amount of time and at a certain difficulty, depending on the level. Examples include counting chickens (sorting newborn chicks into male, female, or angels), chopping wood (while trying not to chop cute cartoon animals that sometimes get put on the chopping block), putting caps on pens in a factory, karate, and other humorously repetitive minigames. By completing these minigames, the player earns money which can be used at a gachapon machine to randomly receive a new minigame, prizes for the gallery, or even a gadget that the player can use on the PSP outside of the game, such as a clock.

== Reception ==
Reception

Aggregate score
Aggregator	Score
Metacritic	63/100

Review scores
Publication	Score
1Up.com	C+
Electronic Gaming Monthly	5.33/10 (Note: Three critics of Electronic Gaming Monthly gave the game each a score of 5.5/10, 4/10, and 6.5/10.)
Famitsu	28/40
Game Informer	7/10
GameSpot	8/10
GameSpy	3/5
GameZone	7.9/10
Hardcore Gamer	1/5
IGN	6.4/10
Official U.S. PlayStation Magazine	4/10
PlayStation: The Official Magazine	5/10

The game received "mixed" reviews according to the review aggregation website Metacritic. In Japan, Famitsu gave it a score of one seven, one eight, one seven, and one six, for a total of 28 out of 40. GamePro said, "You'll laugh out loud in your time spent with Work Time Fun. You'll even become thoroughly immersed in what you're playing, despite its ridiculousness, and for thirty bucks, this is a game you should definitely consider adding to your PSP collection." (Note: GamePro gave the game two 3/5 scores for graphics and sound, 4/5 for control, and 3.75/5 for fun factor.)
