= Prince of Ning =

Prince of Ning (Chinese: 寧王; pinyin: Níng Wáng) may refer to:

- Li Chengqi (679–742), Tang dynasty prince, known as Prince of Ning after 719
- Zhu Quan (朱權, 1378-1448), 17th son of Emperor Ming Hongwu
- Zhu Chenhao (朱宸濠, died 1521), leader of the Prince of Ning rebellion

== See also ==
- Prince of Ning rebellion
