= Gashapon =

Vending machine toys

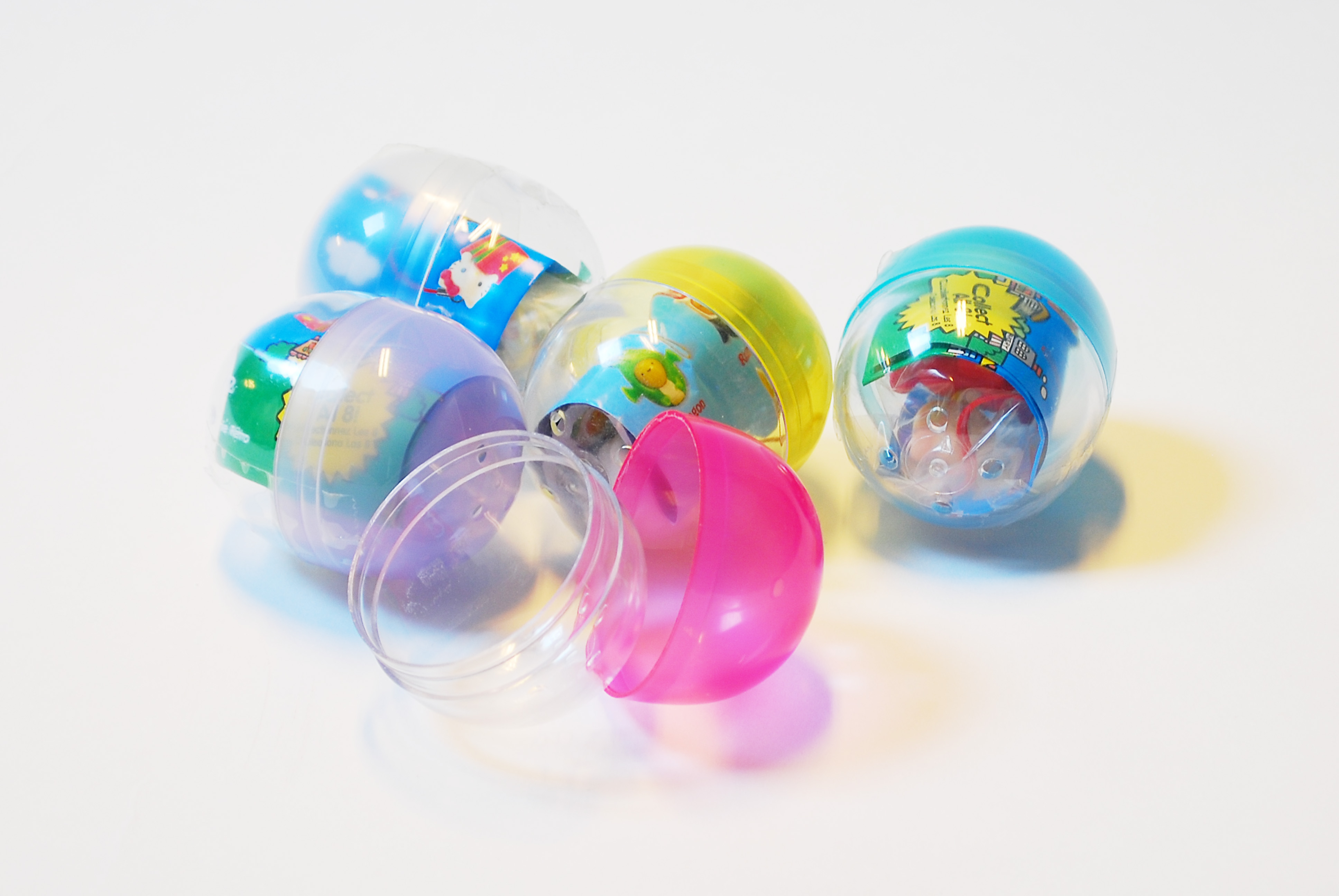
Gashapon capsules

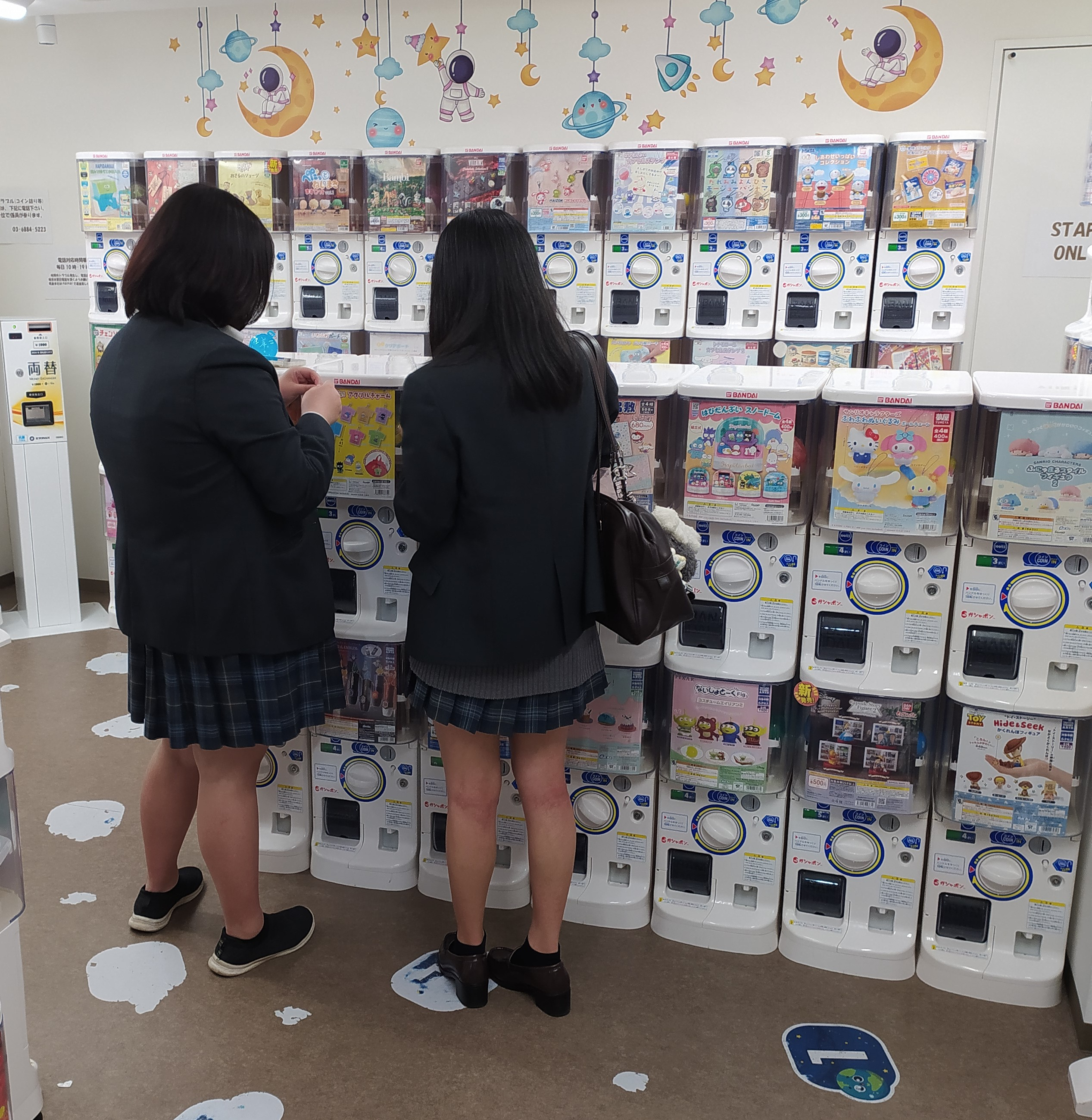
Japanese schoolgirls at gashapon

Gashapon (ガシャポン), also called gachapon (ガチャポン), is a kind of vending machine-dispensed capsule toy manufactured and sold by Bandai. It originated in the 1960s and is popular in Japan.

The word Gashapon, a Bandai trademark, is onomatopoeic from two sounds, gasha (or gacha) for the hand-cranking action of a toy-vending machine, and pon for the toy capsule landing in the collection tray. Gashapon is used for both the machines themselves and the toys obtained from them.

Popular capsule toy manufacturers include Tomy (which uses the trademark gacha (ガチャ, gacha) for their capsule machines) and Kaiyodo. In many countries and territories including Japan, China, the United States, the European Union (European Union trade mark) and the United Kingdom, Gashapon is a registered trademark of Bandai. The capsule toy model has been adapted digitally into numerous gacha video games, such as mobile phone games and massively multiplayer online games (MMOs).

== History ==
Capsule vending machines originate with small vending machines for gumballs that were first invented in the United States (New York), in the 1880s. They were also found in London. These machines took change and dispensed postcards and gum. They were eventually expanded to include the sale of small toys in capsule-shaped containers. This trend became popular in the United States. They were exported to Japan in 1965 from the United States and spread throughout the country in the 1970s. Since 1977, Gashapon has been expanded by Bandai, which now has the gashapon trademark.

The first gashapon machine in Japan was set up by Ryuzo Shigeta, now called "the Grandfather of Gacha". Every item in his machines were wrapped in the plastic balls that are commonly found in today's gashapon.

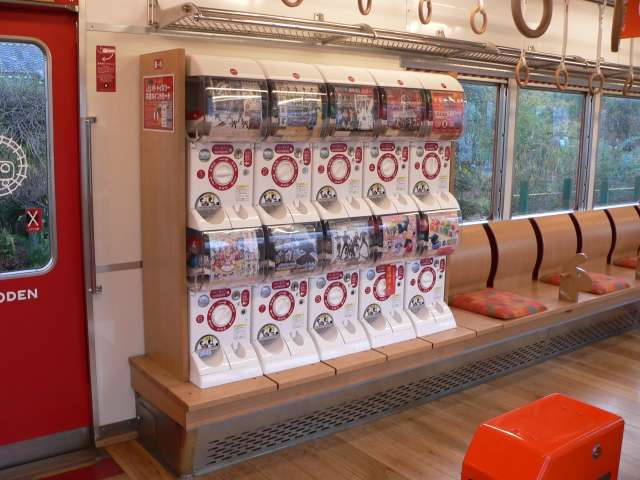
Capsule toy machines located inside Wakayama Electric Railway cars

As more manufacturers entered the market, the popularity of capsule toys continued to grow, especially with the introduction of licensed character-themed items in addition to original toys. They are often installed in candy stores and supermarkets, and there are often multiple machines in one location. With the rise in popularity of collectible figures, the variety of capsule toys has also increased significantly. Since the 2000s, there have been specialty stores that exclusively feature dozens to over one hundred capsule vending machines. Additionally, they are often installed in tourist destinations to offer local souvenirs and goods.

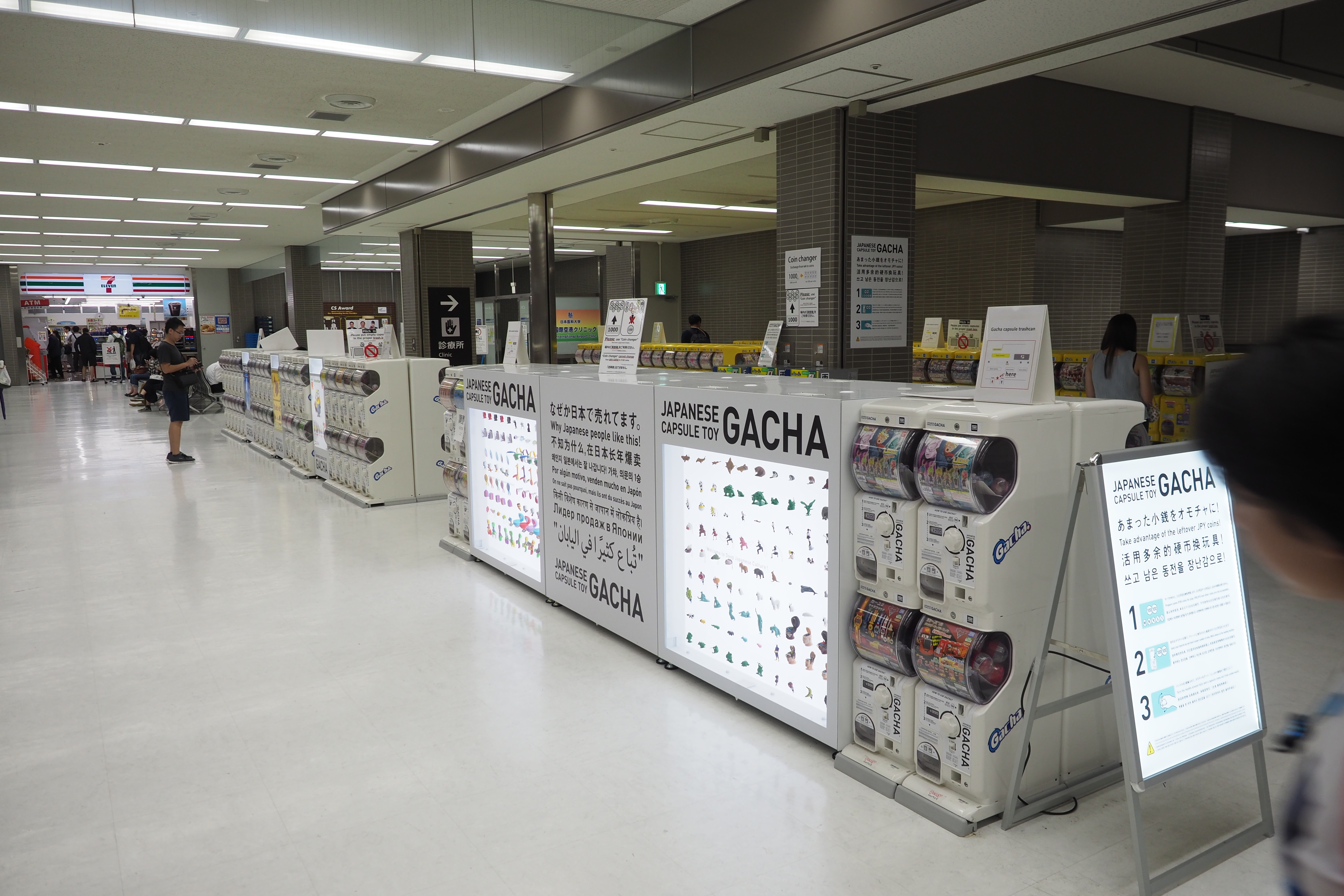
Capsule toy machines lined up in Narita International Airport

Unique examples of places where these machines have been installed include a train cabin of Wakayama Electric Railway's Toy Train as well as West Japan Railway's sightseeing Green Loop Bus. Furthermore, especially before COVID-19, they were also installed in departure lobbies of airports with many international flights, such as at Narita Airport and Kansai Airport. Since foreign currency exchange is generally limited to banknotes, these capsule vending machines were strategically placed so that travelers could use their unexchangeable 100 yen and 500 yen coins as a way to buy souvenirs. They are also widely popular in the Tokyo neighborhoods of Akihabara, Shinjuku, and Shibuya.

As of the 2020s, adults are expressing Shōwa nostalgia by collecting capsule toys.

== Description ==
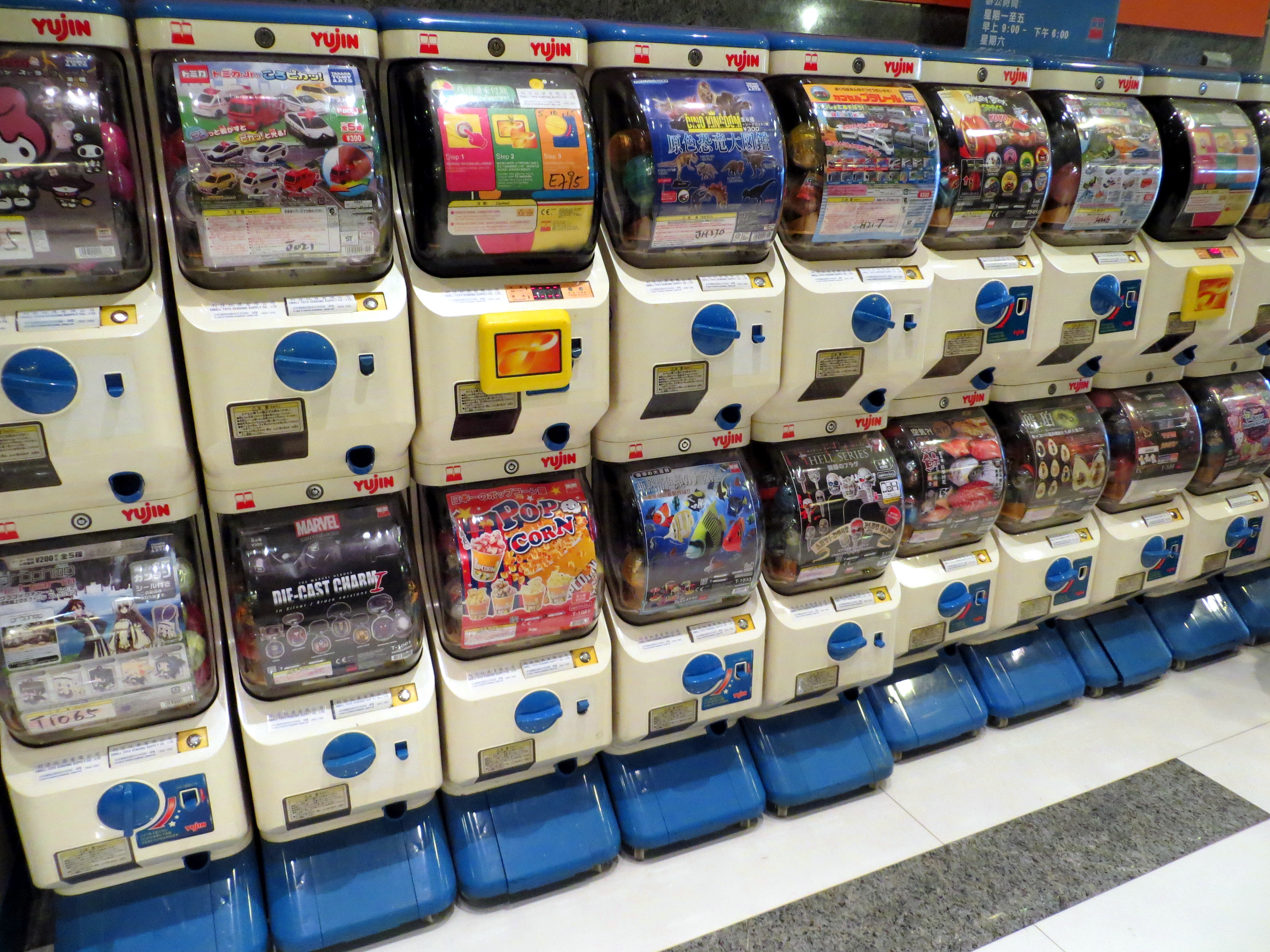
Capsule toy machines in Hong Kong

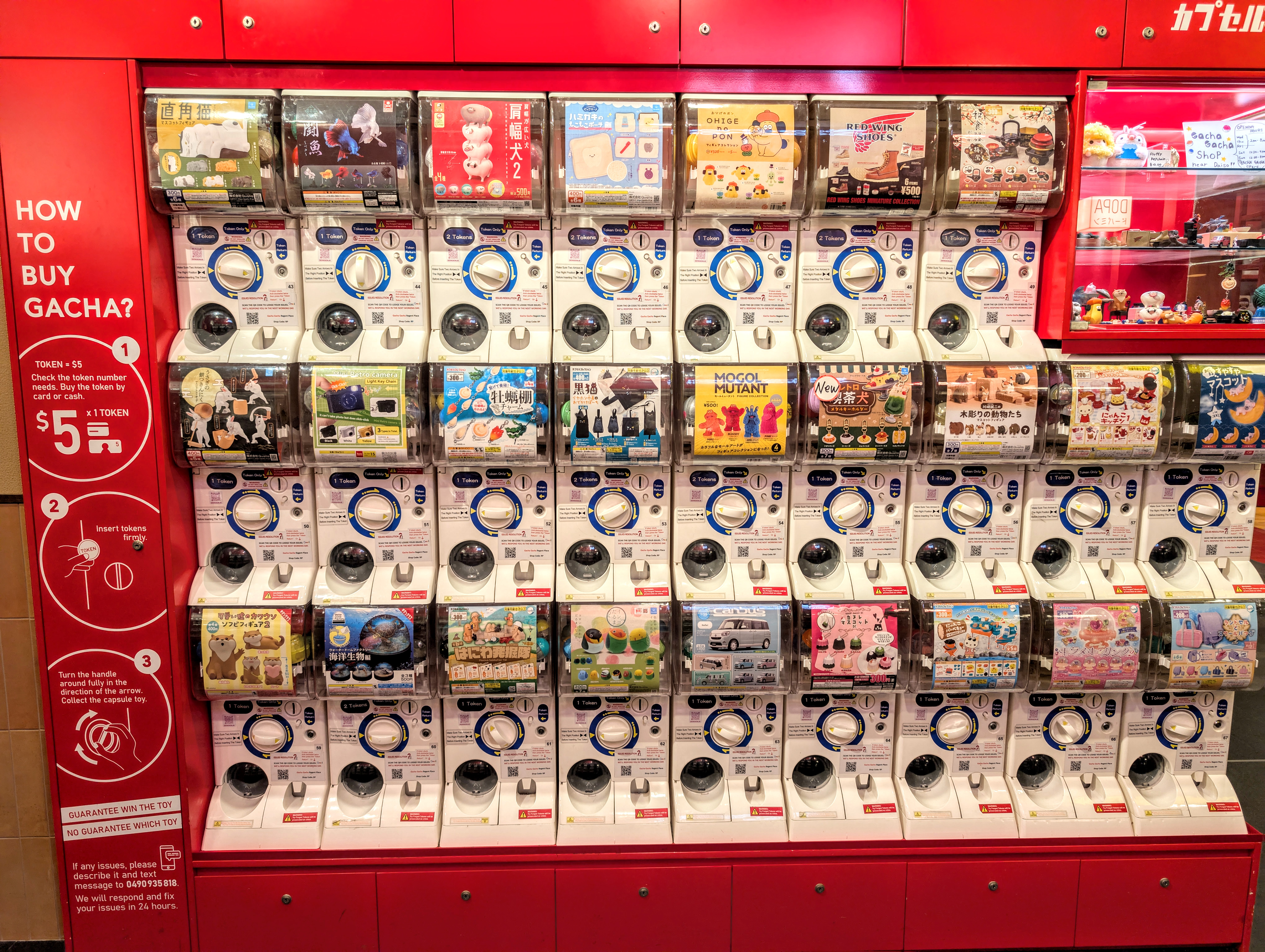
At Regent Place, Sydney, Australia, a Japanese mall in the CBD

Gashapon machines typically sell toys at prices ranging from 100 to 500 Japanese yen (US$0.69–3.45). The toys are typically constructed from high-grade PVC plastic and feature detailed molding and paint applications despite their small size and low retail price. Some gashapon are considered collector's items.

Gashapon toys are often licensed from popular characters in Japanese manga, video games or anime, or from the American entertainment industry. These highly detailed toys have found a large following among all generations in Japan, and the trend is spreading elsewhere in the world, especially among adult collectors. It is not uncommon for sets marketed specifically for adults to feature risqué female figurines.

Gashapon is not limited to prizes that cater to just anime, video games. or manga. They include a variety of prizes outside of this concept as well. These other ideas include non-character items like food, animals, or artwork. Some concepts are aligned with traditional Japanese culture, while some is modern popularity. These items also come in a wide range of sizes, shapes, and colors. Some examples are keychains, figures, jewelry, or more.

Virtually all gashapon are released in sets—each series will have a number of figures to collect. They are by nature a blind purchase; people insert coins and may hope to get a toy or figure they desire. Such an amusement element may become frustrating, as one risks obtaining the same item repeatedly.

Enthusiastic collectors will buy sets from gashapon stores in places such as Tokyo's Akihabara or Osaka's Nipponbashi (Den-Den Town). Depending on the store, the sets are usually cheaper than buying them randomly out of a machine.

Bandai has been selling Gashapon toys since at least 1977. As of March 2021, Bandai Namco has sold 3.711 billion Gashapon toys for ¥100–500 each, generating approximately between ¥371–1,860 billion in estimated sales revenue, since 1977.

Gashapon figures and items are available outside of Japan, including through officially licensed repackagings in the form of blind bags, sold in stores like the US retail chains Five Below and Target. Dedicated gashapon stores also exist, including officially licensed Bandai Gashapon stores like the one in the American Dream mall in New Jersey, and individual gashapon machines in various stores and malls.

== Contents ==
In the past, the encapsulated toys were mostly marketed towards kindergarten to mid-elementary school children, similar to products made by early capsule toy manufacturers in Japan, such as Value Merchandise (Nissho Boeki) and Cosmos. For example, there were erasers based on popular items and characters, such as supercars, Kaiju monsters, Kinnikuman, Super Deformed Gundam or other anime characters, and professional wrestlers. (Though, most of the time those "erasers" were just PVC rubber figures that did not actually erase.) Additionally, there are also machines that have a chance to dispense special prizes that are too large or valuable to be included directly within a capsule. In this case, the machine would dispense a winning capsule (or a winning ticket enclosed within a capsule) that can be exchanged at a store for the prize. For non-winning items, there are often participation prizes like Glico's bonuses (similar to small toys previously common in cereal boxes in the U.S.). Subsequently, products like Bandai's Gashapon HG series helped capsule toys gain recognition in society, and other companies like Yujin joined in as well, resulting in numerous series becoming highly successful merchandise platforms. Since the late 1990s, the market has expanded to include not only children, but also older age groups, and the quality of merchandize has been improved (with slightly higher prices due to the higher quality). Since 2010, the primary reason for the price increase has been the rising manufacturing costs in China. While there are many niche products based on dramas, manga, anime, and games, there is also a wide variety of items ranging from traditional children's toys to realistic and surreal ones.

Furthermore, due to the growing societal awareness of promoting the healthy development of youth, companies have voluntarily been enforcing self-regulation by introducing age restrictions to limit the purchase of products featuring weapons or unsuitable character figures to ages 15 and above. However, age verification mechanisms are yet to be implemented in vending machines, allowing children below the age to purchase such items, which has raised concerns similar to those of adult magazine vending machines.

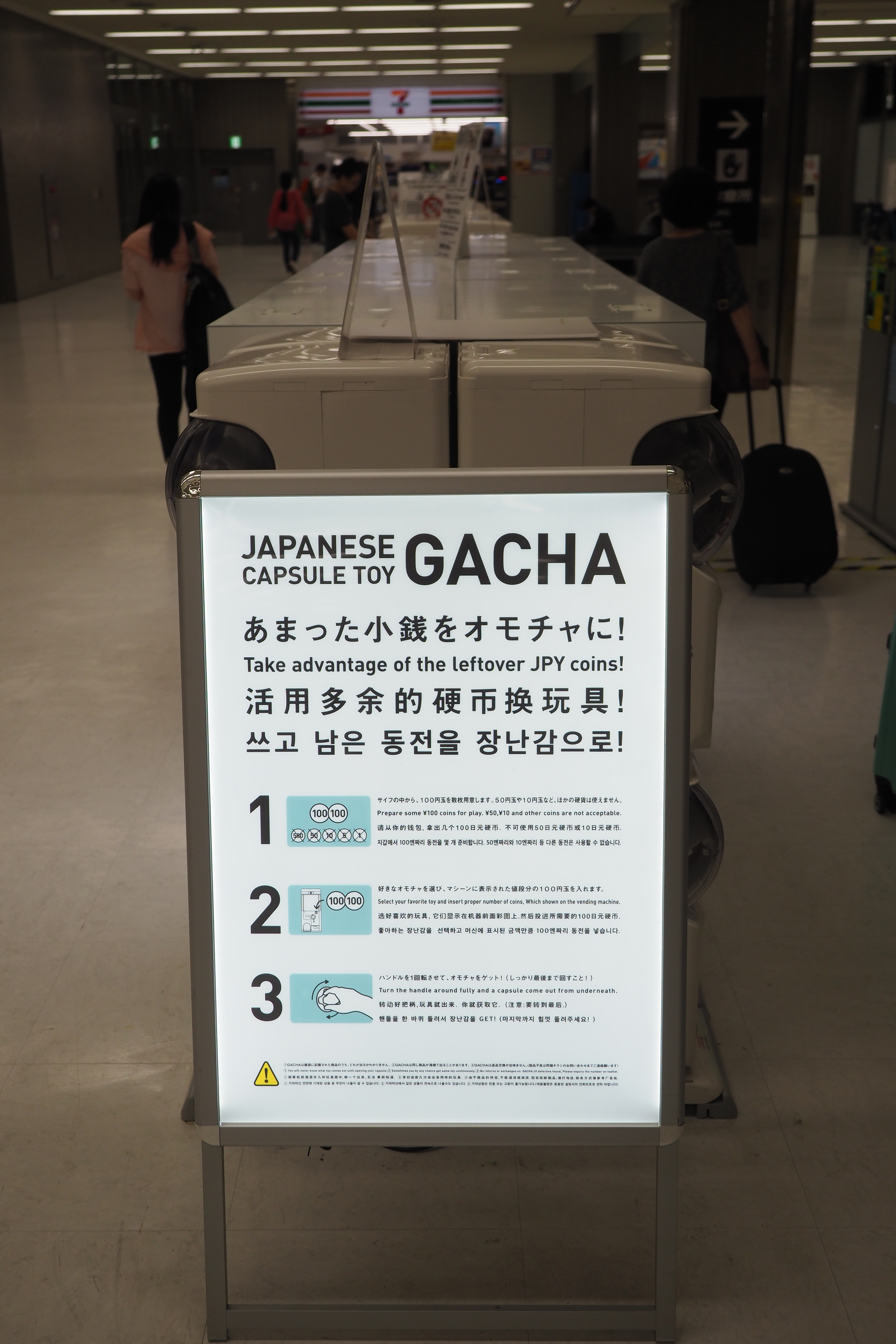
A sign in Tokyo encouraging people to use leftover coins for capsule toys.

Since the 2000s, some capsule vending machines installed in tourist areas and specific regions have included limited-edition products (pins, straps, drawstring bags, coupons, etc.) as local goods. Japan Airlines (JAL) has previously offered limited edition capsule toys containing parts from retired aircraft.

Due to the nature of this sales format, buyers cannot choose the specific item of their choice. Instead, they often exchange duplicates with others to collect a complete set. Because of this practice, these types of toys are sometimes referred to as trading toys or trading figures, similar to items like collectible food toys, where customers also cannot choose the contents. This process of gambling is essential to gashapon. Consumers aren't sure of the products they are getting, so they tend to spend more money trying to get the prize they originally were after. This is the core idea of gashapon. This is also part of the fun of the process – consumers are thrilled by potentially getting the item that they hoped for.

=== Types ===
==== Blind-boxes ====
Capsule toys can now also refer to blind-box trading figures, which are essentially the same product sold randomly out of sealed cardboard packages instead of a machine. Chinese toy brand Pop Mart, which does designer toys in blind boxes, has become popular with teenagers and young adults. Kidrobot is another company famous for their blind boxes, in particular the Dunny series as well as collaborations with various popular franchises. Dreams Inc. uses blind boxes for its Sonny Angel and Smiski figurines. Pop Mart is also famous for their Labubu dolls, which became popular in 2025 due to celebrities like Lisa from K-pop group Blackpink showing pictures of her with the keyring and a big version of the doll.

Blind boxes sold by Pop Mart follow a standardized collectible system. Each blind box contains one figure, and the contents remain unknown to both buyers and sellers until the box is opened. Most series include twelve regular designs, each with an equal probability of being drawn. The blind box cover also displays the full lineup of figures on the back of the packaging. These illustrations typically show all regular designs included in the series and may include an indication that a secret figure exists. While the exact appearance of the secret figure is usually not shown, Pop Mart's product packaging often notes that the secret design has a significantly lower probability of being drawn compared to the regular figures. According to Pop Mart's official product descriptions, regular figures generally have a probability of 1/12, while secret figures may appear at rates as low as 1/144. Some series have a super hidden figure.

Pop Mart also offers whole sets, which consist of all the blind boxes in that series without repetition (but not always guarantee the secret figure). If a customer receives a repeated figure in a whole set, Pop Mart provides a replacement service to ensure the set includes all non-duplicated designs as advertised.

Blind bags are a similar concept but with a disposable bag instead of a cardboard box. This is one way that Gashapon figures make it to the US, as companies like Bandai release their Gashapon figures as blind bags for American audiences. Lego also used blind bags for their collectible Minifigure series, before switching to blind boxes due to environmental concerns.

This is based on fukubukuro, a grab bag of randomized items for a set price that originated in Japan in the 1980s.

==== Bottle cap figures ====
Another variety of capsule toys is bottle cap figures. These small figures are mounted atop plastic bottle caps, as might be found on soda bottles. They are sold both in machine capsules and blind boxes. The caps are not functional as they lack screw threads to secure them to the mouth of the bottle.

Gashapon were initially targeted primarily at children; however, in recent years, an increasing number of adult collectors have entered the market. This growth has been driven by continuous advancements in manufacturing technology, increasingly sophisticated miniature designs, and the expansion of licensed IP collaborations. Compared with children, adult collectors generally have stronger purchasing power, and many are highly motivated to complete entire collections or acquire rare editions. This growing demand among adult consumers has further accelerated the development of the secondary market for gashapon collectibles.

== Video games ==
=== Gacha mechanism in gacha games ===
Games—often freemium—largely based on a gacha mechanism of monetization are referred to as gacha games. Gacha mechanism, or gacha, is essentially a monetization model which the user pays with in-game currency to enter a draw in order to obtain the character or item they want. If a player does not obtain what they hoped for, there is the option of paying with their own money for more draws, and this is the main way to monetize the Gacha games. The gacha game model arose in the early 2010s, faring particularly well in Japan.

Gacha can be free to play. Rare or valuable gaming items often need to be obtained through special gacha purchased with real money. The games may feature different tiers of gacha pulls, which give different sets of rewards. Examples of gacha games include Dragon Collection, Fire Emblem Heroes, Genshin Impact, and Puzzle & Dragons.

Many free-to-play massively multiplayer online games (MMOs) and mobile games also use gacha mechanics, with randomly generated items of varying market values being acquired via microtransactions. In addition, paid console games have included gacha-style progression based on random items but with no in-app purchases, such as Work Time Fun.

The anime-oriented subculture surrounding the production of gacha games has also given birth to the term gacha pop, referring to J-pop songs in diverse genres, from those of pop act Yoasobi to rock musician Kenshi Yonezu, associated with anime soundtracks or aesthetics sought by a global audience.

=== Impact of gacha mechanism on players ===
Gacha mechanism has come under scrutiny for its resemblance to gambling. Similar to gambling, gacha manipulates the emotional state of the player, specifically the player's sense of luck, satisfaction and insecurity, as well as the player's financial stability and dopamine release to ultimately cause a gaming addiction and encourage continued game play. Problematic use of gacha have also indicated to high levels of gambler's fallacy, a luck-related erroneous belief that a certain event is less or more likely to occur, based on a previous series of events.

Winning high ranking virtual items in gacha is extremely rare and unpredictable. As a result, this can ultimately trigger the gambler's fallacy in players. To minimize the relationship between gambling and the use of gacha, in 2016, the Computer Entertainment Supplier's Association (CESA) passed a law stating that companies must disclose the probability of drawing items in paid gachas so consumers can understand their chances of winning.

Besides gambling, gacha games are also commonly associated with parasocial relationships, whereby a sense of attachment between receivers and media characters develops. In terms of gacha games, Gacha players develop a parasocial relationship with in-game characters which players obtain through the gacha mechanism. This parasocial relationship is primarily developed based on the character's aesthetic and rich narrative element. Rentia and Karaseva's study demonstrated how players are initially attracted to gacha games due to the games' aesthetic although moving forward, players grow to greatly value the narrative elements associated with the gacha characters.

When a new character is introduced for the first time in a game, many gacha games will release a quest that follows the character's life events, including the character's life, intentions and aspirations, giving the opportunity for players to get acquainted with the characters. In Genshin Impact for example, when players pull a character, they receive more information and backstory about that specific character. Players can also read information on what characters think about other characters and their relationships. It is at this stage in which some players develop an intense emotional connection and as a result, engage in a parasocial relationship with an in-game character. For many players, the charming anime-style design of gacha characters create a strong attraction, which in time evolves into a strong emotional connection, then a parasocial relationship with the character.

== See also ==
- Booster pack
- Designer toys
- Figurine
- Gumball machine
- Kinder Joy
- Loot box
- Model figure
- Pop Mart
- Urban vinyl
