= Pop Mart =

Chinese toy company

Pop Mart International Group Limited

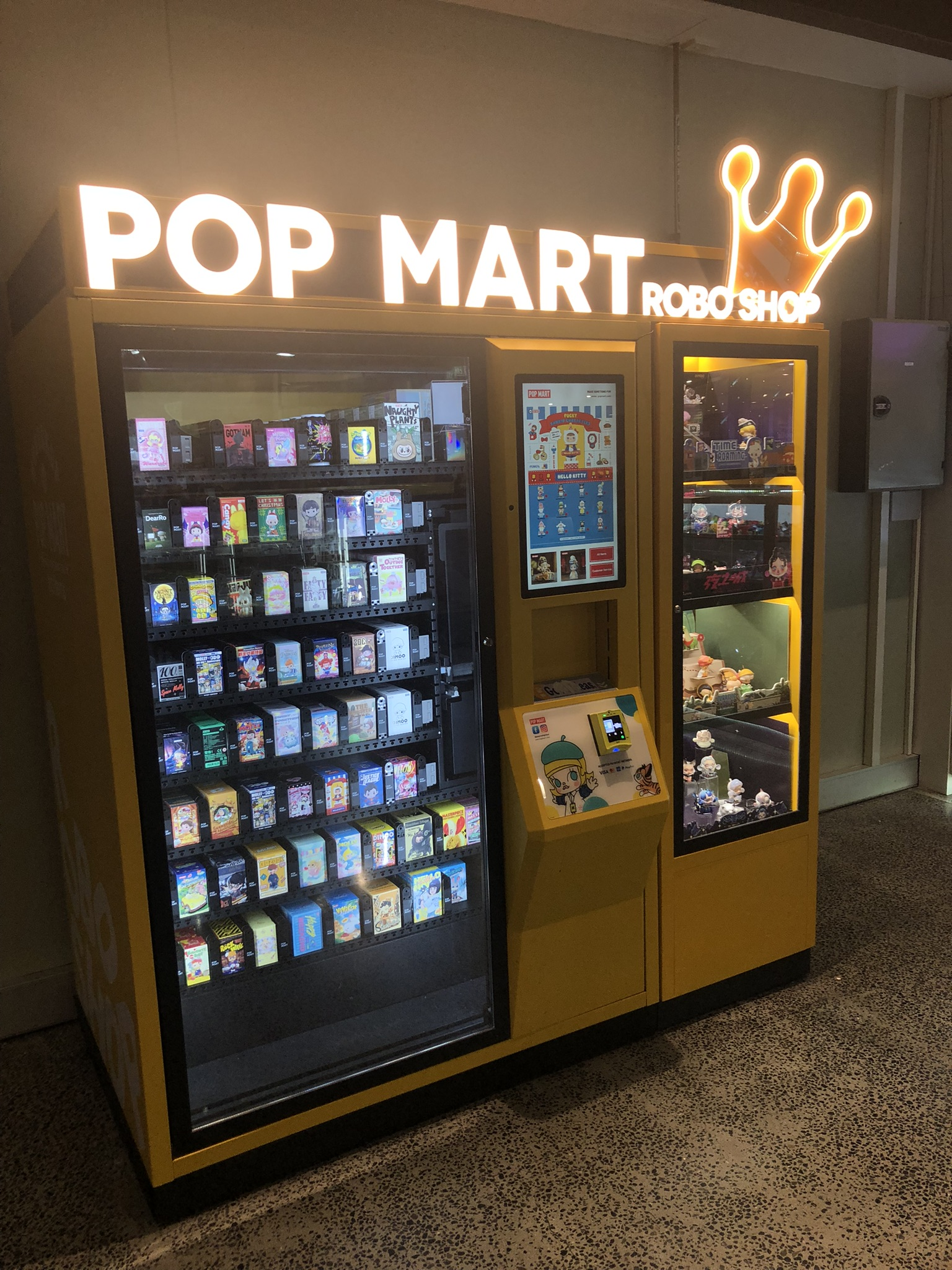
- Photograph of Pop Mart vending machine in Melbourne, Victoria (2023)
- Native name: 北京泡泡玛特文化创意有限公司
- Type: Public
- Traded as: SEHK: 9992
- Industry: Toy industry
- Founded: 2010
- Founder: Wang Ning
- Headquarters: Beijing, China
- Area served: Global
- Website: www.popmart.com

Pop Mart (Chinese: 泡泡玛特; pinyin: Pào pào mǎ tè) is a Chinese toy company based in Beijing. The company is known for selling collectible toys and figurines in a "blind box" format. The company produces toys based on its in-house IPs, such as Labubu, as well as licensed themes, such as Disney, Teletubbies, The Powerpuff Girls, Care Bears and Harry Potter.

The Financial Times described the company as having "elevated toy-buying to an act of trendy connoisseurship among China's young affluent consumers", and as having been "credited with creating the market for so-called designer toys".

Around half of its sales are made at physical outlets, with the rest made online. The company additionally operates a social media and toy-trading app as part of its marketing strategy. Its toys are known for selling to collectors on the second-hand market; venture capital firms have been known to invest in its second-hand products.

== History ==
The company was founded in China in 2010 by Wang Ning. Its first store opened near Beijing's Zhongguancun in 2010. In 2014, the company discontinued other product lines and focused on toys.

The brand's initial marketing strategy engaged with youth culture trends in China, selling toys at prices ranging from 29 and 89 yuan. Over time it grew to 288 outlets and 1,800 vending machines in China. Its success in the 'blind box' format preceded a $676 million listing on the Hong Kong Stock Exchange in 2020, valuing the company at around $7 billion. Revenue growth subsequently slowed and shares declined below the offer price.

The company later expanded its growth strategy beyond mainland Chinese markets, with the Financial Times reporting on plans in 2022 to open between 40 and 50 overseas outlets. It first expanded to the U.S., New Zealand, Australia, South Korea, Taiwan, and the U.K. in 2022. In 2023 it expanded to Malaysia and France. In 2024, it opened its first Philippine store. Some equity analysts have expressed scepticism at the company's ability to expand into the West, while executives of the company have described developing that growth market as the company's 'most important development focus'; and argued that the company's product offering is differentiated from existing western markets.

The success of the company has spawned multiple rival blind box toy companies in China.

== Products and stores ==
=== Business model ===
Pop Mart develops original characters with independent artists and also establishes collaborations with external intellectual properties. In 2023, original artist IP accounted for about 76.5% of revenue and licensed IP contributed about 16.5%. Pop Mart collaborates with artists such as Kasing Lung (Labubu) and Kenny Wong (Molly), and brands including Disney, DC Comics, SpongeBob SquarePants and Harry Potter.

=== Blind boxes ===
In China, the toys are sold for typically between 59 and 69 RMB each, in a "blind box" format credited with "driving repeated purchases from customers seeking to secure the rarest collectables". Its customers in China are typically affluent teenagers and young adults.

The company works with designers and artists to develop characters. In 2021, it released a collection themed around the U.S. artist Keith Haring, and has also collaborated with Moncler.

In 2025, the plush toy category, including characters such as Labubu and Skullpanda, generated a substantial share of Pop Mart's revenue, according to the company's annual report. Pop Mart experienced growth and expansion due to its blind boxes. Research has shown that scarcity results in increased competition; the "blind" aspect of Pop Mart's most popular products creates an "artificial scarcity" environment that has been inferred by researchers to contribute to the global success of the company. In 2023 alone, Pop Mart revealed to have made $165m in net profits, with the main revenue coming in from the blind boxes of popular characters such as Skullpanda, Molly, and Dimoo. Researchers have attributed the success behind blind boxes to psychological factors such as "herd mentality" and "gambler's mentality". Success is also attributed to the fact that the majority of consumers are Millennials and Generation Z, with researchers speculating that younger generations hold greater attachment to material objects and, as a result, are the target demographic for blind boxes.

=== Featured artists and characters ===
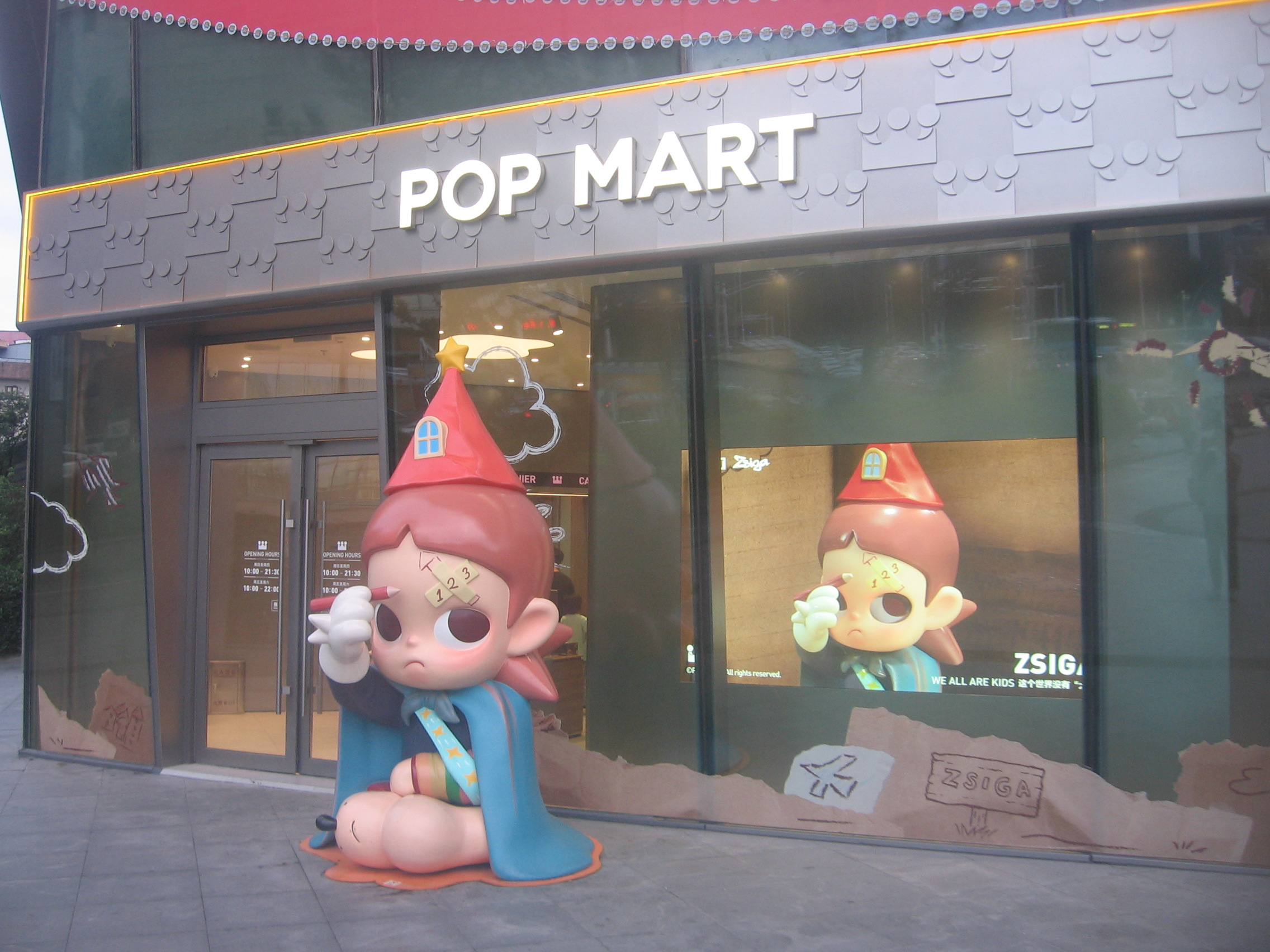
A Pop Mart store in Zhenjiang, Jiangsu, China.

Artists are listed in the order they are presented on Pop Mart's website:

| Artist | Character or product | Based in |
|---|---|---|
| Coolrain & Labo | Coolabo | South Korea |
| Lang | Hirono | Beijing (China) |
| Xiong Miao | Skullpanda | Mainland China |
| Ayan Deng | Dimoo | Mainland China |
| Kenny Wong | Molly | Hong Kong (China) |
| Philip Colbert | Lobster Land | London (England) |
| Two Clouds | Azura | N/A |
| Pucky | Pucky | Hong Kong (China) |
| Seulgie Lee | Satyr Rory | South Korea |
| Ohkubo Hiroto | Instinctoy | Japan |
| Kasing Lung | The Monsters | Belgium |
| Yoyo Yeung | Yoki | London (England) |
| Libby Frame | Peach Riot | Los Angeles, CA (United States) |
| Molly | Crybaby | Hong Kong |
| Da Xin | Twinkle Twinkle | Mainland China |

=== Stores ===
The company has both staffed outlets, as well as vending machines known as "roboshops". In the United States, there are 37 staffed outlets (as of June 2025) and 52 "roboshops".

On 30 July 2026, POP MART opened its first POP BAKERY in Southeast Asia at Resorts World Sentosa in Singapore, marking the brand's first international bakery concept.

=== Diversification ===
In December 2021, Pop Mart launched Pop Mart Global in the United States. The company launched an official mobile game in May 2023. Pop Mart opened Pop Land, a branded amusement park in Beijing, in October 2023.

== Reception ==
=== Regulation in China ===
In 2022, Chinese regulators issued guidance on blind‑box businesses that advise a per‑box price cap of CN¥200, and since 2023, bar sales to children under eight and require guardian consent for sales to children over eight.

=== Regulation in Singapore ===
In Singapore, a S$100 prize value limit on mystery boxes has been imposed by the Ministry of Home Affairs.

=== Counterfeit dolls ===
On 18 August 2025, the United States Consumer Product Safety Commission released a public notice to American consumers that they had received numerous reports of individuals and businesses selling fake Labubu plush dolls. These knock-off dolls, known online as "Lafufus", are made with inferior materials to their legitimate counterparts and have become notorious for breaking apart and presenting possible choking hazards to infants and small children.

Numerous articles, posts, and videos about how to tell real Labubus apart from their inferior imitators have been released by news publishers, journalists, TikTok and YouTube users, and by Pop Mart themselves. Notable differences in these "Lafufus" can be identified through poorer quality materials and paint jobs, stitching, and misspelling on the keychain tags. Additionally, counterfeit Labubus might have a different number of teeth than the correct number of nine teeth found uniformly across all real Labubus produced and sold by Pop Mart. Labubus produced and sold by Pop Mart also have a QR code attached to the doll's tag that allow product verification. Pop Mart has made several attempts to warn their customers around the globe away from accidentally purchasing counterfeit Labubus from suspicious channels. They encourage consumers to investigate their purchases for different packaging and incorrect branding details and to purchase their Labubus and other Pop Mart products through official channels exclusively to insure their purchase is legitimate.

=== Forced labor ===
In April 2026, Pop Mart stated that it would conduct an investigation following a report of dolls that contain Xinjiang cotton prohibited under the Uyghur Forced Labor Prevention Act.
