= Fukubukuro =

Japanese grab bags filled with unknown random contents

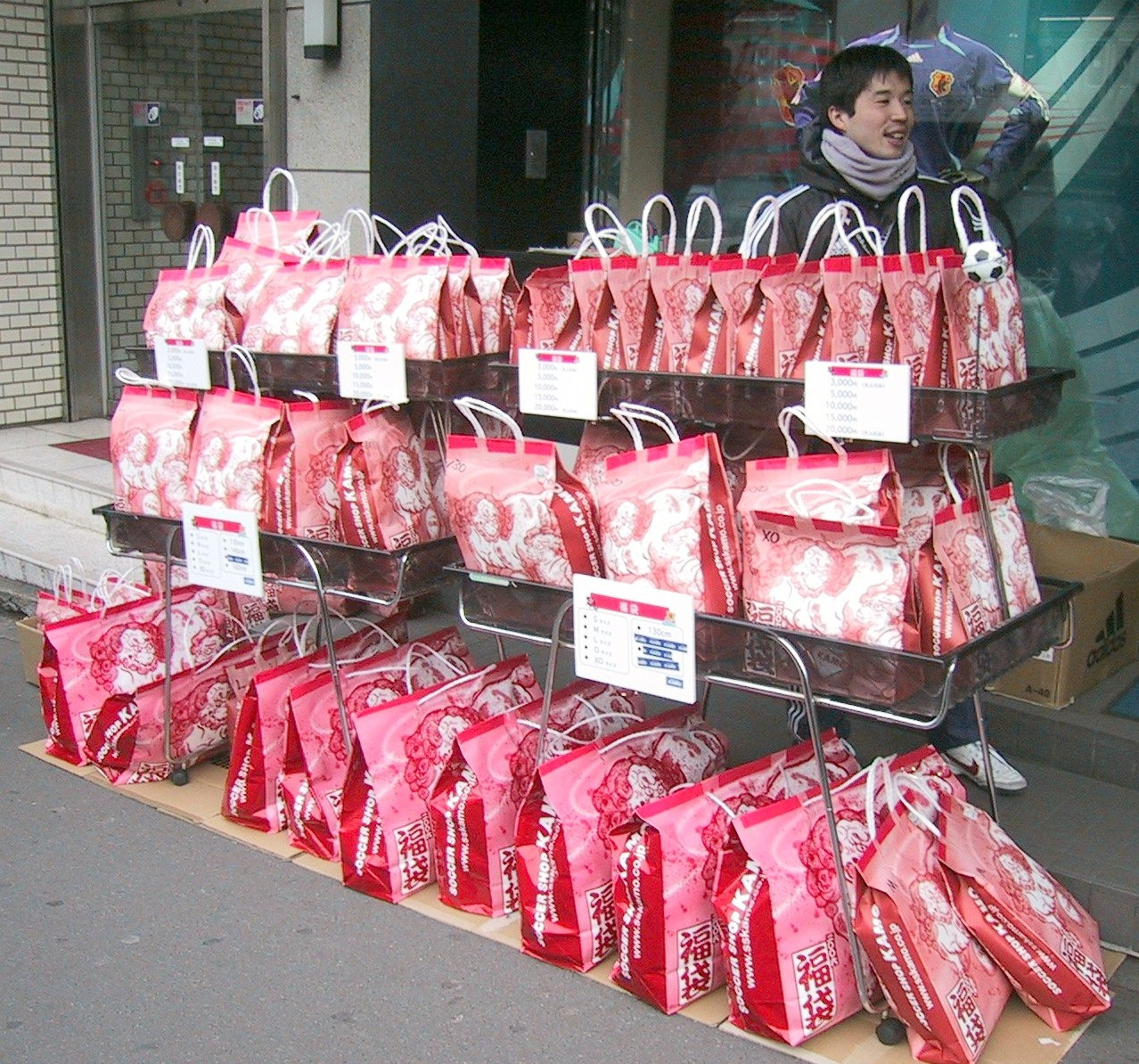
Fukubukuro on sale outside a store on Takeshita Street Tokyo, in 2006

Fukubukuro (Japanese: 福袋; pronounced [ɸɯ̥kɯbɯꜜkɯɾo]; "lucky bag") is a Japanese New Year custom in which merchants make grab bags filled with unknown random contents and sell them for a substantial discount, usually 50% or more off the list price of the items contained within. The low prices are usually done to attract customers to shop at that store during the new year. The term is formed from fuku (福; meaning "good fortune" or "luck") and fukuro (袋; meaning "bag"), changing to bukuro for a phenomenon known as rendaku. The fuku comes from the Japanese saying that "there is fortune in leftovers" (残り物には福がある, nokorimono ni wa fuku ga aru). Popular stores' fukubukuro usually are snapped up quickly by eager customers, with some stores having long lines snake around city blocks hours before the store opens on New Year's Day.

Fukubukuro are an easy way for stores to unload excess and unwanted merchandise from the previous year, due to a Japanese superstition that one must not start the New Year with unwanted items from the previous year and start clean. Nowadays, some fukubukuro are pushed as a lavish New Year's event, where the contents are revealed beforehand, but this practice is criticized as just a renaming of selling things as sets.

== History ==
The concept of fukubukuro was invented by Ginza Matsuya Department Store in the late Meiji era and has since spread to most retailers. The custom has spread to other cultures; for example, in the Honolulu shopping center Ala Moana Center, several stores adopted in this tradition in 2004. Many Sanrio Stores in the United States often adopt this tradition as well.

== Contents ==
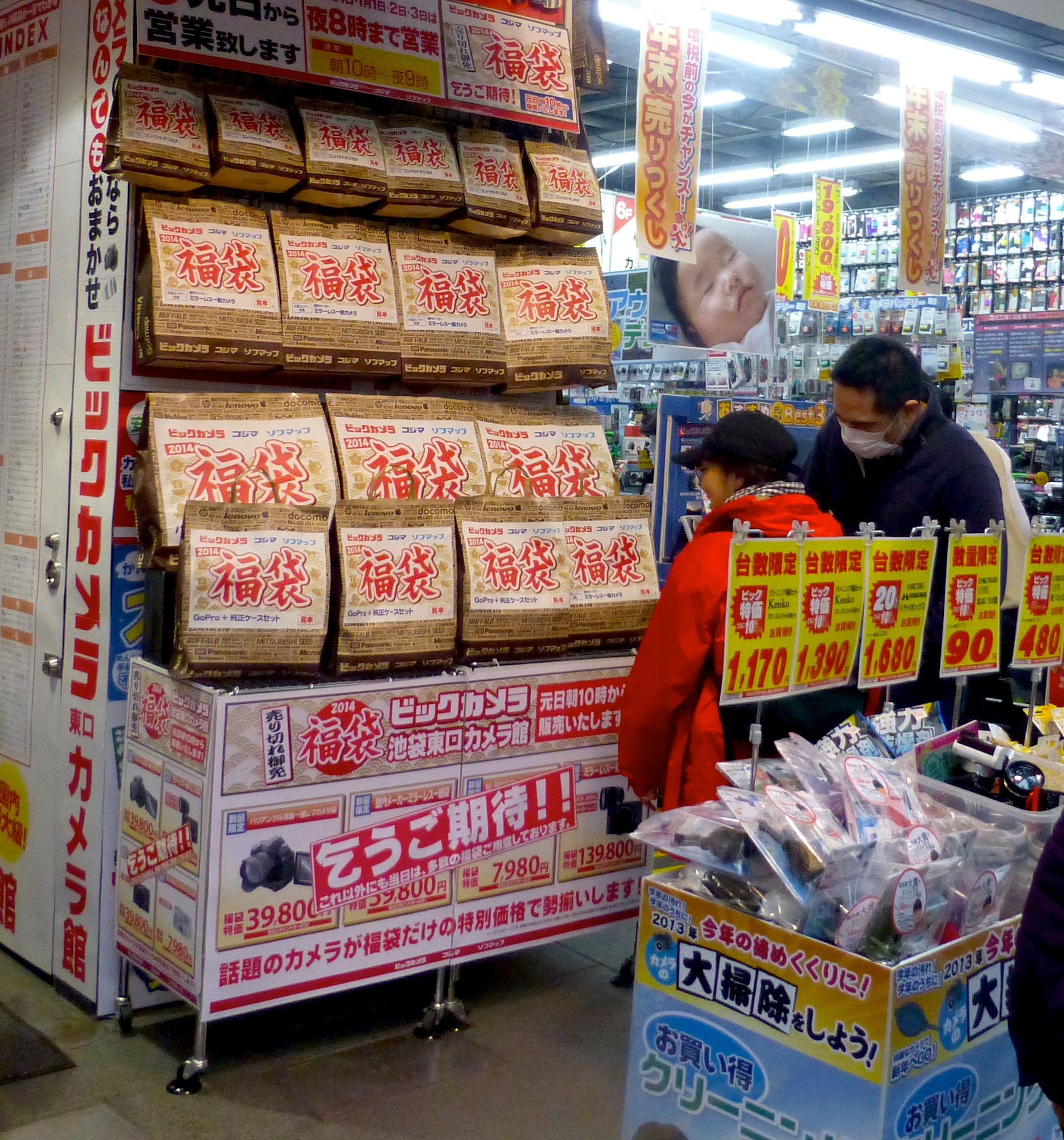
Fukubukuro on sale in Tokyo in 2013

Depending on the business, merchants plan out what will go into these grab bags and what the selling price will be months in advance. In major department stores, grab bags are usually themed to specific departments (e.g. a young adult section of the store would have fukubukuro with trendy merchandise, the shoe section would have several high priced shoes in the bag, etc.). In other stores (especially smaller stores), many fukubukuro are often filled with items that relate to the store or think kindly of the customers needs (e.g. a tea store would offer fukubukuro in a tea crate with bags of tea, tea cups, and blankets). Many stores often include extra items, such as expensive purses (sometimes worth well into the tens of millions of yen), tickets to far away places, even fur coats and vouchers for expensive electronics to entice shoppers to take a chance and shop at their store. The randomness of such inserts is a reason why fukubukuro are sometimes known as "good luck bags" or "lucky bags." Vouchers are used if the items involved are large items that cannot be put inside a bag (e.g. large appliances), intangible goods, or services.

Bags containing nothing but unwanted items are known colloquially as fukōbukuro (不幸袋; "misfortune bags") or utsubukuro (鬱袋; "depressing bags"), and some stores which have nothing good to offer inside actually name their bags this and offer them at extremely low prices (such as 500–1000 yen).

Fukubukuro come at a variety of different prices. Most bags are priced ranging from a few hundred to a few 10,000 yen (1–100 USD). However, every year there are also a few extremely expensive fukubukuro available. In 2006, the most expensive fukubukuro was priced at 200.6 million yen (1.7 million USD) at a Ginza jewelry store. Another set of bags was priced at 150 million yen apiece (1.2 million USD) at Mitsukoshi.
