= Traxxpad =

- Developer: Definitive Studios
- Publisher: Eidos Interactive
- Platform: PlayStation Portable
- Release: NA: June 26, 2007
- Genre: Music video game
- Mode: Single-player

Traxxpad is a music application for Sony's PlayStation Portable developed by American company Definitive Studios and published by Eidos Interactive. It was released June 26, 2007. Traxxpad is a portable music studio featuring a sequencer, drum machine, and keyboard for the creation of music tracks. It features a library of over 1000 sound samples for use, and allows users to record their own samples using a microphone for the PSP.

== Use ==
MELOD mode

Traxxpad uses Real Time Interactive Sequencing Technology (or RTIST) to create patterns from samples either in real-time or a step at a time. The MELOD mode allows users to modify the pitch of samples using a keyboard-like interface. The Studio Through a Console (or STAC) mode allows users to use patterns made in RTIST and put them together.

When finished, you are able to export it to a memory stick or share it with others through an ad hoc network.
