= List of Xbox 360 games (A–L) =

This is a list of Xbox 360 games (A-L) that were released via retail disc, digital download or as part of the Xbox Live Arcade program. (Note: For a chronological list, click the sort button in any of the available region's columns. Games dated November 22, 2005 (North America), December 2, 2005 (Europe), December 10, 2005 (Japan), and March 23, 2006 (Australia) are launch titles for the specified regions.)

There are 2155 games on both parts of this list. (Note: This number is always up to date by this script.)

3D 3D support	K Kinect optional K required	DL Downloadable titles	XBLIG Xbox Live Indie Games	XBLA Xbox Live Arcade titles	XBO Xbox One forward compatible	XE Xbox One X enhanced

Title	Genre(s)	Developer(s)	Publisher(s)	Release date				Addons	Xbox One	Ref.
Title	Genre(s)	Developer(s)	Publisher(s)	NA	EU	JP	AU	Addons	Xbox One	Ref.
0 Day Attack on Earth	Shooter	Gulti	Square Enix	Dec 23, 2009	Unreleased	Unreleased	Unreleased	XBLA	XBO	
007 Legends	First-person shooter	Eurocom	Activision	Oct 16, 2012	Oct 19, 2012	Unreleased	Oct 31, 2012			
007: Quantum of Solace	First-person shooter	Treyarch	Activision	Nov 4, 2008	Oct 31, 2008	Mar 26, 2009	Nov 19, 2008			
0-D Beat Drop	Puzzle & trivia	Cyclone Zero	Arc System Works	Nov 11, 2009	Unreleased	Unreleased	Unreleased	XBLA		
1 vs. 100	Party	Microsoft Game Studios	Microsoft Game Studios	Nov 19, 2009	Unreleased	Unreleased	Unreleased	XBLA		
11eyes CrossOver	Visual novel	Lass	5pb.	Unreleased	Unreleased	Apr 2, 2009	Unreleased			
1942: Joint Strike	Vertically scrolling shooter	Backbone Entertainment	Capcom	Jul 23, 2008	Unreleased	Unreleased	Unreleased	XBLA		
2006 FIFA World Cup	Sports	EA Canada	EA Sports	Apr 24, 2006	Apr 28, 2006	Apr 27, 2006	May 1, 2006			
2010 FIFA World Cup South Africa	Sports	EA Canada	EA Sports	Apr 27, 2010	Apr 30, 2010	May 13, 2010	Apr 29, 2010			
2014 FIFA World Cup Brazil	Sports	EA Canada	EA Sports	Apr 15, 2014	Apr 17, 2014	Apr 24, 2014	Apr 17, 2014			
3 on 3 NHL Arcade	Sports & recreation	EA Canada	Electronic Arts	Feb 11, 2009	Unreleased	Unreleased	Unreleased	XBLA		
3D Ultra Minigolf Adventures	Sports & recreation	Wanako Games	Vivendi Games	Apr 18, 2007	Unreleased	Unreleased	Unreleased	XBLA	XBO	
3D Ultra Minigolf Adventures 2	Sports & recreation	Wanako Games	Konami	Oct 27, 2010	Unreleased	Unreleased	Unreleased	XBLA		
50 Cent: Blood on the Sand	Third-person shooter	Swordfish Studios	THQ	Feb 24, 2009	Feb 20, 2009	Jul 23, 2009	Feb 26, 2009		XBO	
A.R.E.S.: Extinction Agenda EX	Action & adventure	Extend Studio	Aksys Games	Oct 2, 2013	Unreleased	Unreleased	Unreleased	XBLA		
Absolute: Blazing Infinity	Tactical role-playing	Idea Factory	Idea Factory	Unreleased	Unreleased	Mar 29, 2007	Unreleased			
Abyss Odyssey	Action & adventure	Ace Team	Atlus	Jul 16, 2014	Unreleased	Unreleased	Unreleased	XBLA		
AC/DC Live: Rock Band Track Pack	Music	Harmonix	MTV Games	Nov 2, 2008	Dec 19, 2008	Unreleased	Dec 18, 2008			
Ace Combat 6: Fires of Liberation	Combat flight simulation game	Namco Bandai Games	Namco Bandai Games	Oct 23, 2007	Nov 23, 2007	Nov 1, 2007	Dec 13, 2007		XBO	
Ace Combat: Assault Horizon	Combat flight simulation game	Namco Bandai Games	Namco Bandai Games	Oct 11, 2011	Oct 14, 2011	Oct 13, 2011	Oct 13, 2011			
Aces of the Galaxy	Action-adventure	Artech Digital Entertainment	Vivendi Games	Jun 4, 2008	Unreleased	Unreleased	Unreleased	XBLA	XBO	
Adidas miCoach	Sports	Lightning Fish	505 Games	Jul 24, 2012	Jul 13, 2012	Jul 26, 2012	Unreleased	K		
Adrenalin Misfits	Sports	Konami	Konami	Nov 4, 2010	Nov 10, 2010	Nov 18, 2010	Nov 20, 2010	K		
Adventure Time: Explore the Dungeon Because I Don't Know!	Action-adventure	WayForward Technologies	D3 Publisher^{NA}, Namco Bandai Games^{EU}	Nov 19, 2013	Nov 15, 2013	Unreleased	Nov 21, 2013			
Adventure Time: Finn & Jake Investigations	Action-adventure	Vicious Cycle Software	Little Orbit	Oct 20, 2015	Nov 6, 2015	Unreleased	Nov 5, 2015			
Adventure Time: The Secret of the Nameless Kingdom	Action-adventure	WayForward Technologies	Little Orbit	Nov 18, 2014	Nov 28, 2014	Unreleased	Nov 20, 2014		XBO	
The Adventures of Shuggy	Action-adventure	Smudged Cat Games	Valcon Games	Jun 15, 2012	Unreleased	Unreleased	Unreleased	XBLA		
The Adventures of Tintin: The Secret of the Unicorn	Action-adventure	Ubisoft Montpellier	Ubisoft	Dec 6, 2011	Oct 21, 2011	Unreleased	Dec 1, 2011	3D K		
Aegis Wing	Action-adventure	Carbonated Games	Microsoft Game Studios	May 16, 2007	Unreleased	Unreleased	Unreleased	XBLA	XBO	
AFL Live	Sports	Big Ant Studios	Tru Blu Entertainment	Unreleased	May 29, 2011	Unreleased	Apr 21, 2011			
AFL Live 2	Sports	Wicked Witch Software	Tru Blu Entertainment	Unreleased	Unreleased	Unreleased	Sep 12, 2013			
Afro Samurai	Action	Namco Bandai Games	Namco Bandai Games	Jan 27, 2009	Mar 27, 2009	Unreleased	Apr 2, 2009			
After Burner Climax	Shooter	Sega	Sega	Apr 21, 2010	Unreleased	Unreleased	Unreleased	XBLA		
Age of Booty	Strategy & simulation	Certain Affinity	Capcom	Oct 15, 2008	Unreleased	Unreleased	Unreleased	XBLA	XBO	
Air Conflicts: Pacific Carriers	Combat flight simulation game	Games Farm	bitComposer	Unreleased	Dec 7, 2012	Unreleased	Sep 26, 2012			
Air Conflicts: Secret Wars	Combat flight simulation game	Games Farm	bitComposer	Sep 28, 2011	Jul 8, 2011	Unreleased	Aug 4, 2011			
Air Conflicts: Vietnam	Combat flight simulation game	Kalypso Media	Kalypso Media	Oct 15, 2013	Oct 15, 2013	Sep 12, 2013	Oct 15, 2013			
AirMech Arena	Action & adventure	Carbon Games	Ubisoft	Jul 30, 2014	Unreleased	Unreleased	Unreleased	XBLA	XBO	
Akai Katana Shin	Bullet hell	Cave	Cave	May 15, 2012	May 11, 2012	May 26, 2011	Aug 28, 2012			
Akatsuki no Amaneka to Aoi Kyojin	Action-adventure	CyberFront	CyberFront	Unreleased	Unreleased	Jun 28, 2011	Unreleased			
Alan Wake	Third-person shooter	Remedy Entertainment	Microsoft Game Studios	May 18, 2010	May 14, 2010	May 27, 2010	May 20, 2010		XBO	
Alan Wake's American Nightmare	Action & adventure	Remedy Entertainment	Microsoft Studios	Feb 22, 2012	Feb 22, 2012	Feb 22, 2012	Feb 22, 2012	XBLA	XBO	
Alarm for Cobra 11: Crash Time	Racing	Synetic	RTL	Unreleased	May 8, 2008	Unreleased	Unreleased			
Alice: Madness Returns	Action-adventure	Spicy Horse	Electronic Arts	Jun 14, 2011	Jun 17, 2011	Jul 21, 2011	Jun 16, 2011		XBO	
Alien Breed 2: Assault	Shooter	Team17	Microsoft Game Studios	Sep 22, 2010	Unreleased	Unreleased	Unreleased	XBLA		
Alien Breed 3: Descent	Shooter	Team17	Microsoft Game Studios	Nov 17, 2010	Unreleased	Unreleased	Unreleased	XBLA		
Alien Breed: Evolution	Shooter	Team17	Microsoft Game Studios	Dec 16, 2009	Unreleased	Unreleased	Unreleased	XBLA		
Alien Hominid HD	Action & adventure	The Behemoth	Microsoft Game Studios	Feb 28, 2007	Unreleased	Unreleased	Unreleased	XBLA	XBO	
Alien Rage	Shooter	CI Games	CI Games	Oct 18, 2013	Unreleased	Unreleased	Unreleased	XBLA		
Alien Spidy	Action & adventure	Enigma Software Productions	Kalypso Media	Mar 20, 2013	Unreleased	Unreleased	Unreleased	XBLA		
Alien: Isolation	Survival horror	The Creative Assembly	Sega	Oct 7, 2014	Oct 7, 2014	Unreleased	Oct 7, 2014			
Aliens vs. Predator	First-person shooter	Rebellion Developments	Sega	Feb 16, 2010	Feb 19, 2010	Unreleased	Feb 18, 2010		XBO	
Aliens: Colonial Marines	First-person shooter	Gearbox Software	Sega	Feb 12, 2013	Feb 12, 2013	Unreleased	Feb 12, 2013			
All Round Hunter (Note: Also known as Field & Stream: Outdoorsman Challenge.)	Hunting/fishing	Beast Studios	505 Games	Jun 25, 2010	Jun 25, 2010	Unreleased	Unreleased			
All Zombies Must Die!	Action & adventure	Doublesix	Square Enix	Dec 27, 2011	Jan 4, 2012	Unreleased	Unreleased	XBLA		
All-Pro Football 2K8	Sports	Visual Concepts	2K Sports	Jul 16, 2007	Unreleased	Unreleased	Unreleased			
Alone in the Dark	Survival horror	Eden Games	Atari	Jun 23, 2008	Jun 20, 2008	Dec 25, 2008	Jun 26, 2008			
Alpha Protocol	Action role-playing	Obsidian Entertainment	Sega	Jun 1, 2010	May 28, 2010	Unreleased	May 27, 2010			
Altered Beast	Classics	Backbone Entertainment	Sega	Jun 10, 2009	Unreleased	Unreleased	Unreleased	XBLA	XBO	
Alvin and the Chipmunks: Chipwrecked	Music	Behaviour Interactive	Majesco, 505 Games	Nov 15, 2011	Apr 5, 2012	Unreleased	Unreleased	K		
The Amazing Spider-Man	Action-adventure	Beenox	Activision	Jun 26, 2012	Jun 29, 2012	Unreleased	Jun 27, 2012			
The Amazing Spider-Man 2	Action-adventure	Beenox	Activision	Apr 29, 2014	May 2, 2014	Unreleased	May 7, 2014			
Amaneka of Dawn and the Deep-Blue Golem	Strategy	Kogado Studio	Cyberfront	Unreleased	Unreleased	Mar 11, 2010	Unreleased			
American McGee's Alice	Action-adventure, DLC	Rogue Entertainment	Electronic Arts	Jun 14, 2011	Unreleased	Unreleased	Unreleased	XBLA		
American Mensa Academy	Puzzle	Silverball Studios	Square Enix	Dec 12, 2012	Unreleased	Unreleased	Unreleased	XBLA		
America's Army: True Soldiers	Tactical shooter	Red Storm Entertainment	Ubisoft	Nov 15, 2007	Unreleased	Unreleased	Unreleased			
Amped 3	Sports	Indie Built	2K Sports	Nov 22, 2005	Dec 2, 2005	Unreleased	Mar 23, 2006			
AMY	Action & adventure	VectorCell	Lexis Numérique	Jan 11, 2012	Unreleased	Unreleased	Unreleased	XBLA		
Anarchy Reigns	Beat 'em up	PlatinumGames	Sega	Jan 8, 2013	Jan 11, 2013	Jul 5, 2012	Jan 10, 2013			
Ancients of Ooga	Platformer	NinjaBee	Microsoft Game Studios	Jun 30, 2010	Unreleased	Unreleased	Unreleased	XBLA		
Angry Birds Star Wars	Puzzle	Rovio Entertainment, Exient Entertainment	Activision	Oct 29, 2013	Nov 1, 2013	Nov 8, 2013	Unreleased			
Angry Birds Trilogy	Puzzle	Rovio Entertainment	Activision	Sep 25, 2012	Sep 28, 2012	Unreleased	Nov 14, 2012	K		
Anna: Extended Edition	Action & adventure	Dreampainters	Kasedo Games	Sep 26, 2014	Unreleased	Unreleased	Unreleased	XBLA		
Anomaly: Warzone Earth	Strategy & simulation	11 Bit Studios	Microsoft Studios	Apr 6, 2012	Unreleased	Unreleased	Unreleased	XBLA	XBO	
Apache: Air Assault	Combat flight simulation game	Gaijin Entertainment	Activision	Nov 16, 2010	Nov 19, 2010	Unreleased	Feb 23, 2011			
Apocalypse: Desire Next	Strategy	Idea Factory	Idea Factory	Unreleased	Unreleased	Nov 29, 2007	Unreleased			
Apples to Apples	Puzzle & trivia	ImaginEngine	THQ	Dec 7, 2011	Unreleased	Unreleased	Unreleased	XBLA		
Aqua	Action & adventure	Games Distillery	Microsoft Game Studios	May 19, 2010	Unreleased	Unreleased	Unreleased	XBLA	XBO	
AquaZone: Life Simulator	Simulation	Frontier Groove	Frontier Groove	Unreleased	Unreleased	Sep 14, 2006	Unreleased			
Arcana Heart 3	Fighting	Examu	Arc System Works	Unreleased	Aug 19, 2011	Jan 13, 2011	Unreleased			
Arcania: Gothic 4	Action role-playing	Spellbound Entertainment	JoWood	Oct 19, 2010	Oct 29, 2010	Mar 24, 2011	Nov 21, 2010			
Arcania: The Complete Tale (Note: Contains the expansion Arcania: Fall of Setarrif, which was only released with this game.)	Action role-playing, stand-alone expansion	Spellbound Entertainment	Nordic Games	Nov 8, 2013	Aug 30, 2013	Unreleased	Jul 15, 2013			
Are You Smarter Than a 5th Grader?: Game Time	Family & educational	Blitz Games	THQ	Oct 26, 2009	Unreleased	Unreleased	Unreleased	XBLA		
Are You Smarter Than a 5th Grader?: Make The Grade	Family & educational	Blitz Games	THQ	Oct 29, 2008	Unreleased	Unreleased	Unreleased	XBLA	XBO	
Arkadian Warriors	Action & adventure	Wanako Games	Activision	Dec 12, 2007	Unreleased	Unreleased	Unreleased	XBLA		
Arkanoid Live!	Puzzle & trivia	Taito	Taito	May 6, 2009	Unreleased	Unreleased	Unreleased	XBLA	XBO	
Armored Core 4	Vehicular combat	FromSoftware	Sega, 505 Games^{EU}, From Software^{JP}	Mar 20, 2007	Jun 22, 2007	Mar 22, 2007	Jun 28, 2007			
Armored Core V	Vehicular combat	FromSoftware	Namco Bandai Games America	Mar 20, 2012	Mar 23, 2012	Jan 26, 2012	Mar 22, 2012			
Armored Core: For Answer	Vehicular combat	FromSoftware	Sega	Sep 16, 2008	Nov 28, 2008	Mar 19, 2008	Nov 27, 2008			
Armored Core: Verdict Day	Vehicular combat	FromSoftware	Namco Bandai	Sep 24, 2013	Sep 27, 2013	Sep 26, 2013	Sep 26, 2013			
Army of Two	Third-person shooter	EA Montreal	Electronic Arts	Mar 6, 2008	Mar 7, 2008	Mar 19, 2008	Mar 13, 2008		XBO	
Army of Two: The 40th Day	Third-person shooter	EA Montreal	Electronic Arts	Jan 12, 2010	Jan 15, 2010	Mar 25, 2010	Jan 14, 2010			
Army of Two: The Devil's Cartel	Third-person shooter	Visceral Games	Electronic Arts	Mar 26, 2013	Mar 29, 2013	Mar 28, 2013	Mar 28, 2013			
Ascend: Hand of Kul	Action & adventure	Signal Studios	Microsoft Studios	Sep 25, 2013	Unreleased	Unreleased	Unreleased	XBLA		
Ashes Cricket 2009	Sports	Transmission Games	Codemasters	Unreleased	Jul 8, 2009	Unreleased	Jul 13, 2009			
Assassin's Creed	Action-adventure; stealth	Ubisoft Montreal	Ubisoft	Nov 13, 2007	Nov 16, 2007	Nov 29, 2007	Nov 21, 2007		XBO XE	
Assassin's Creed II	Action-adventure, stealth	Ubisoft Montreal	Ubisoft	Nov 17, 2009	Nov 20, 2009	Dec 3, 2009	Nov 19, 2009		XBO	
Assassin's Creed III	Action-adventure, stealth	Ubisoft Montreal	Ubisoft	Oct 30, 2012	Oct 31, 2012	Nov 15, 2012	Oct 31, 2012	3D	XBO	
Assassin's Creed IV: Black Flag	Action-adventure, stealth	Ubisoft Montreal	Ubisoft	Oct 29, 2013	Oct 29, 2013	Nov 28, 2013	Oct 29, 2013		XBO	
Assassin's Creed Rogue	Action-adventure, stealth	Ubisoft Sofia	Ubisoft	Nov 11, 2014	Nov 14, 2014	Unreleased	Nov 13, 2014		XBO	
Assassin's Creed: Brotherhood	Action-adventure, stealth	Ubisoft Montreal	Ubisoft	Nov 16, 2010	Nov 19, 2010	Dec 9, 2010	Nov 18, 2010		XBO	
Assassin's Creed: Liberation HD	Action & adventure	Ubisoft Sofia	Ubisoft	Jan 15, 2014	Jan 15, 2014	Jan 15, 2014	Jan 15, 2014	XBLA	XBO	
Assassin's Creed: Revelations	Action-adventure, stealth	Ubisoft Montreal	Ubisoft	Nov 15, 2011	Nov 15, 2011	Dec 1, 2011	Nov 15, 2011	3D	XBO	
Assault Heroes	Action & adventure	Wanako Games	Microsoft Game Studios	Dec 13, 2006	Unreleased	Unreleased	Unreleased	XBLA		
Assault Heroes 2	Action & adventure	Wanako Games	Vivendi Games	May 14, 2008	Unreleased	Unreleased	Unreleased	XBLA	XBO	
Asterix at the Olympic Games	Sports	Étranges Libellules	Atari	2008	Aug 22, 2008	Unreleased	Unreleased			
Asteroids/Asteroids Deluxe	Classics	Stainless Games	Atari	Nov 28, 2007	Unreleased	Unreleased	Unreleased	XBLA	XBO	
AstroPop	Puzzle & trivia	PopCap Games	Microsoft Game Studios	Mar 22, 2006	Unreleased	Unreleased	Unreleased	XBLA	XBO	
Asura's Wrath	Action, Beat 'em up	CyberConnect2	Capcom	Feb 21, 2012	Mar 9, 2012	Feb 23, 2012	Feb 23, 2012		XBO	
Attack of the Movies 3D	Rail shooter	Panic Button	Majesco	May 18, 2010	Unreleased	Unreleased	Unreleased			
A-Train HX	Train sim	Artdink	505 Games^{EU}, Artdink^{JP}	Unreleased	Mar 7, 2008	Dec 21, 2006	Feb 28, 2008			
Autobahn Polizei	Racing	Tommo	Conspiracy Entertainment	May 4, 2010	Unreleased	Unreleased	Unreleased			
Avatar FameStar	Party game	Microsoft Studios	Microsoft Studios	Jul 26, 2012	Unreleased	Unreleased	Unreleased	XBLA		
Avatar: The Last Airbender – The Burning Earth	Action-adventure	THQ	THQ	Nov 19, 2007	Nov 16, 2007	Unreleased	Nov 29, 2007			
Awesomenauts	Platformer	Ronimo Games	dtp entertainment	May 2, 2012	Unreleased	Unreleased	Unreleased	XBLA		
Axel & Pixel	Family & educational	Silver Wish Games	2K Games	Oct 14, 2009	Unreleased	Unreleased	Unreleased	XBLA	XBO	
Babel Rising	Kinect	Mando Productions	Ubisoft	Jun 13, 2012	Unreleased	Unreleased	Unreleased	K XBLA	XBO	
Back to the Future: The Game	Graphic adventure	Telltale Games	Telltale Games	Oct 13, 2015	Unreleased	Unreleased	Oct 23, 2010			
Backbreaker	Sports	NaturalMotion	505 Games	Jun 1, 2010	Jun 4, 2010	Unreleased	Jun 3, 2010			
Backbreaker: Vengeance	Sports & recreation	NaturalMotion	505 Games	Jun 29, 2011	Unreleased	Unreleased	Unreleased	XBLA		
Backyard Football 2010	Sports	FarSight Studios	Atari	Oct 20, 2009	Unreleased	Unreleased	Unreleased			
Backyard Sports: Rookie Rush	Sports	HB Studios	Atari	Oct 20, 2010	Unreleased	Unreleased	Unreleased			
Backyard Sports: Sandlot Sluggers	Sports	HB Studios	Atari	May 25, 2010	Unreleased	Unreleased	Unreleased			
Baja: Edge of Control	Racing	2XL Games	THQ	Sep 22, 2008	Sep 26, 2008	Unreleased	Sep 25, 2008			
Bakugan Battle Brawlers	Action	Now Production	Activision	Oct 20, 2009	Oct 23, 2009	Unreleased	Oct 28, 2009			
Bakugan: Defenders of the Core	Action	Now Production	Activision	Oct 26, 2010	Oct 29, 2010	Unreleased	Oct 27, 2010			
Band Hero	Music	Neversoft	Activision	Nov 3, 2009	Nov 6, 2009	Unreleased	Nov 25, 2009			
Band of Bugs	Strategy & simulation	NinjaBee	Microsoft Game Studios	Jun 20, 2007	Unreleased	Unreleased	Unreleased	XBLA	XBO	
BandFuse: Rock Legends	Music	Realta Entertainment Group	Mastiff	Nov 19, 2013	Unreleased	Dec 19, 2013	Unreleased			
Bang Bang Racing	Racing & flying	Digital Reality	Digital Reality	Jun 6, 2012	Unreleased	Unreleased	Unreleased	XBLA		
Bangai-O HD: Missile Fury	Shooter	Treasure	D3 Publisher	May 4, 2011	Unreleased	Unreleased	Unreleased	XBLA		
Banjo-Kazooie	Classics	Rare/4J Studios	Microsoft Game Studios	Nov 26, 2008	Nov 26, 2008	Nov 26, 2008	Nov 26, 2008	XBLA	XBO XE	
Banjo-Kazooie: Nuts & Bolts	Platformer, Construction and management simulation	Rare	Microsoft Game Studios	Nov 11, 2008	Nov 14, 2008	Dec 11, 2008	Nov 20, 2008		XBO XE	
Banjo-Tooie	Classics	Rare/4J Studios	Microsoft Game Studios	Apr 29, 2009	Apr 29, 2009	Apr 29, 2009	Apr 29, 2009	XBLA	XBO XE	
Bankshot Billiards 2	Sports & recreation	PixelStorm	Microsoft Game Studios	Nov 22, 2005	Unreleased	Unreleased	Unreleased	XBLA		
Barbie and her Sisters: Puppy Rescue	Party	Little Orbit	Little Orbit	Nov 3, 2015	Nov 6, 2015	Unreleased	Nov 5, 2015			
Bass Pro Shops: The Hunt	Hunting/fishing	Piranha Games	XS Games	Jun 2, 2010	Unreleased	Unreleased	Unreleased			
Bass Pro Shops: The Strike	Hunting/fishing	Piranha Games	XS Games	Oct 6, 2009	Unreleased	Unreleased	Unreleased			
Bastion	Role playing	Supergiant Games	Warner Bros. Interactive Entertainment	Jul 20, 2011	Jul 20, 2011	Jul 20, 2011	Jul 20, 2011	XBLA		
Batman: Arkham Asylum	Action-adventure	Rocksteady Studios	Eidos Interactive, Warner Bros. Interactive Entertainment	Aug 25, 2009	Aug 28, 2009	Jan 14, 2010	Sep 3, 2009	3D		
Batman: Arkham City	Action-adventure	Rocksteady Studios	Warner Bros. Interactive Entertainment	Oct 18, 2011	Oct 21, 2011	Nov 23, 2011	Oct 19, 2011	3D		
Batman: Arkham Origins	Action-adventure	WB Games Montréal	Warner Bros. Interactive Entertainment	Oct 25, 2013	Oct 25, 2013	Dec 5, 2013	Oct 25, 2013		XBO	
Batman: Arkham Origins Blackgate - Deluxe Edition	Action & adventure	Armature Studio	Warner Bros. Interactive Entertainment	Apr 1, 2014	Apr 2, 2014	Unreleased	Apr 2, 2014	XBLA		
Batman: The Telltale Series	Graphic adventure	Telltale Games	Telltale Games	Sep 13, 2016	Sep 16, 2016	Unreleased	Sep 28, 2016	XBLA		
Battle Academy	Turn-based strategy	Slitherine	Slitherine	Dec 12, 2014	Unreleased	Unreleased	Unreleased	XBLA		
Battle Fantasia	Fighting	Arc System Works	Arc System Works	Sep 16, 2008	Mar 6, 2009	May 29, 2008	Unreleased			
Battle vs. Chess	Board Game	TopWare Interactive, Gaijin Entertainment	SouthPeak Games	Unreleased	May 11, 2011	Unreleased	Unreleased			
Battle: Los Angeles	Action & adventure	Live Action Studios	Konami	Mar 11, 2011	Unreleased	Unreleased	Unreleased	XBLA		
BattleBlock Theater	Action & adventure	The Behemoth	Microsoft Studios	Apr 3, 2013	Apr 3, 2013	Apr 3, 2013	Apr 3, 2013	XBLA	XBO	
Battlefield 1943	Shooter	EA DICE	Electronic Arts	Jul 8, 2009	Unreleased	Unreleased	Unreleased	XBLA	XBO	
Battlefield 2: Modern Combat	First-person shooter	EA Digital Illusions CE	Electronic Arts	Apr 11, 2006	Apr 13, 2006	Apr 27, 2006	Apr 12, 2006		XBO	
Battlefield 3	First-person shooter	EA Digital Illusions CE	Electronic Arts	Oct 25, 2011	Oct 28, 2011	Nov 2, 2011	Oct 27, 2011		XBO	
Battlefield 4	First-person shooter	EA Digital Illusions CE	Electronic Arts	Oct 29, 2013	Nov 1, 2013	Nov 7, 2013	Oct 31, 2013			
Battlefield Hardline	First-person shooter	Visceral Games	Electronic Arts	Mar 17, 2015	Mar 20, 2015	Mar 19, 2015	Mar 19, 2015			
Battlefield: Bad Company	First-person shooter	EA Digital Illusions CE	Electronic Arts	Jun 23, 2008	Jun 27, 2008	Jun 26, 2008	Jun 26, 2008		XBO	
Battlefield: Bad Company 2	First-person shooter	EA Digital Illusions CE	Electronic Arts	Mar 2, 2010	Mar 5, 2010	Mar 11, 2010	Mar 4, 2010		XBO	
Battleship	First-person shooter	Double Helix Games	Activision	May 15, 2012	Apr 20, 2012	Unreleased	Apr 18, 2012			
Battlestar Galactica	Action	N3V Games	Sierra Entertainment	Oct 24, 2007	Unreleased	Unreleased	Unreleased	XBLA		
Battlestations: Midway	Action, Real-time tactics	Eidos Interactive	Eidos Interactive, Spike ^{JP}	Jan 30, 2007	Feb 9, 2007	Feb 7, 2008	Feb 16, 2007		XBO	
Battlestations: Pacific	Action, Real-time tactics	Eidos Interactive	Eidos Interactive	May 12, 2009	May 15, 2009	May 21, 2009	May 28, 2009		XBO	
Battlezone	Classics	Stainless Games	Atari	Apr 16, 2008	Unreleased	Unreleased	Unreleased	XBLA		
Bayonetta	Action, hack and slash	PlatinumGames	Sega	Jan 5, 2010	Jan 8, 2010	Oct 29, 2009	Jan 7, 2010		XBO	
Beat'n Groovy	Action & adventure	Voltex, Inc.	Konami	Oct 8, 2008	Unreleased	Unreleased	Unreleased	XBLA	XBO	
The Beatles: Rock Band	Music	Harmonix	MTV Games	Sep 9, 2009	Sep 9, 2009	Unreleased	Sep 9, 2009			
Beautiful Katamari (Note: Beautiful Katamari Damacy in Japan.)	Puzzle, action, Third-person	Namco Bandai Games	Namco Bandai Games	Oct 16, 2007	Feb 29, 2008	Oct 18, 2007	Mar 7, 2008		XBO	
Bee Movie Game	Action, adventure	Beenox	Activision	Oct 30, 2007	Nov 16, 2007	Unreleased	Dec 5, 2007			
Beijing 2008	Sports	Eurocom	Sega	Jul 8, 2008	Jun 27, 2008	Jul 31, 2008	Jun 26, 2008			
Bejeweled 2	Puzzle & trivia	PopCap Games	PopCap Games	Nov 22, 2005	Unreleased	Unreleased	Unreleased	XBLA	XBO	
Bejeweled 3	Puzzle & trivia	PopCap Games	PopCap Games	Dec 10, 2010	Unreleased	Unreleased	Unreleased	XBLA	XBO	
Bejeweled Blitz Live	Puzzle & trivia	PopCap Games	PopCap Games	Feb 23, 2011	Unreleased	Unreleased	Unreleased	XBLA		
Bellator: MMA Onslaught	Fighting	Kung Fu Factory	345 Games	Jul 4, 2012	Unreleased	Unreleased	Unreleased	XBLA	XBO	
Ben 10 Alien Force: The Rise of Hex	Action & adventure	Black Lantern Studios	Konami	May 26, 2010	Unreleased	Unreleased	Unreleased			
Ben 10 Alien Force: Vilgax Attacks	Action	Papaya Studio	D3 Publisher	Oct 27, 2009	Mar 12, 2010	Unreleased	Nov 19, 2009			
Ben 10: Galactic Racing	Racing	Monkey Bar Games	D3 Publisher^{NA}, Namco Bandai Games^{EU}	Oct 18, 2011	Nov 25, 2011	Unreleased	Nov 24, 2011			
Ben 10: Omniverse	Action, Beat 'em up	Vicious Cycle Software	D3 Publisher^{NA}, Namco Bandai Games^{EU}	Nov 13, 2012	Nov 30, 2012	Unreleased	Nov 29, 2012			
Ben 10: Omniverse 2	Action, Beat 'em up	High Voltage Software	D3 Publisher^{NA}, Namco Bandai Games^{EU}	Nov 5, 2013	Nov 22, 2013	Unreleased	Nov 28, 2013			
Ben 10 Ultimate Alien: Cosmic Destruction	Action-adventure	Papaya Studio	D3 Publisher^{NA}, Namco Bandai Games^{EU}	Oct 19, 2010	Oct 19, 2010	Unreleased	Jan 10, 2011			
Beowulf: The Game	Action, Hack & Slash	Ubisoft	Ubisoft	Nov 13, 2007	Nov 16, 2007	Unreleased	Nov 22, 2007			
Beyond Good & Evil HD	Action-adventure	Ubisoft Shanghai	Ubisoft	Mar 2, 2011	Unreleased	Unreleased	Unreleased	XBLA	XBO	
Big Bumpin'	Racing, action	Blitz Games	King Games	Nov 19, 2006	Unreleased	Unreleased	Unreleased			
Big League Sports	Sports	Koolhaus Games	Activision	Nov 8, 2011	Nov 11, 2011	Unreleased	Unreleased	K		
The Biggest Loser: Ultimate Workout	Fitness	Blitz Games Studios	THQ	Nov 4, 2010	Nov 10, 2010	Nov 18, 2010	Unreleased	K		
The Bigs 2	Sports, baseball	Blue Castle Games	2K Sports	Jul 7, 2009	Jul 17, 2009	Unreleased	Jul 17, 2009			
The Bigs	Sports, baseball	Blue Castle Games	2K Sports	Jun 25, 2007	Unreleased	Unreleased	Unreleased			
Binary Domain	Third-person shooter	Ryū ga Gotoku Studios	Sega	Feb 28, 2012	Feb 24, 2012	Feb 16, 2012	Feb 23, 2012	K	XBO	
Bionic Commando	Action-adventure, third-person shooter	GRIN	Capcom	May 19, 2009	May 22, 2009	Jun 25, 2009	May 21, 2009			
Bionic Commando Rearmed	Action & adventure	GRIN	Capcom	Aug 13, 2008	Unreleased	Unreleased	Unreleased	XBLA		
Bionic Commando Rearmed 2	Action & adventure	Fatshark	Capcom	Feb 2, 2011	Unreleased	Unreleased	Unreleased	XBLA	XBO	
Bionicle Heroes	Third-person shooter	Traveller's Tales	Eidos Interactive, TT Games Publishing	Nov 15, 2006	Nov 24, 2006	Unreleased	Dec 1, 2006			
BioShock	First-person shooter	2K Boston/2K Australia	2K Games, Spike^{JP}	Aug 21, 2007	Aug 24, 2007	Feb 21, 2008	Aug 24, 2007		XBO	
BioShock 2	First-person shooter	2K Marin	2K Games	Feb 9, 2010	Feb 9, 2010	Mar 4, 2010	Feb 9, 2010		XBO	
BioShock Infinite	First-person shooter	Irrational Games	2K Games	Mar 26, 2013	Mar 26, 2013	Apr 25, 2013	Mar 26, 2013		XBO	
Birds of Steel	Combat flight simulation game	Gaijin Entertainment	Konami	Mar 13, 2012	Mar 16, 2012	Mar 8, 2012	Mar 29, 2012			
Black College Football: The Xperience	Sports	Nerjyzed Entertainment	Aspyr	Sep 29, 2009	Unreleased	Unreleased	Unreleased		XBO	
The Black Eyed Peas Experience	Music	iNiS	Ubisoft	Nov 8, 2011	Nov 11, 2011	Unreleased	Nov 10, 2011	K		
Black Knight Sword	Action & adventure	Grasshopper Manufacture	D3 Publisher	Dec 12, 2012	Unreleased	Unreleased	Unreleased	XBLA		
Blacklight: Tango Down	Shooter	Zombie Studios	Ignition Entertainment	Jul 7, 2010	Unreleased	Unreleased	Unreleased	XBLA		
BlackSite: Area 51	First-person shooter	Midway Games	Midway Games	Nov 12, 2007	Nov 30, 2007	Unreleased	Nov 29, 2007			
Blackwater	First-person shooter	Zombie Studios	505 Games	Oct 25, 2011	Nov 4, 2011	Unreleased	Nov 3, 2011	K		
Blade Kitten	Action & adventure	Krome Studios	Atari	Sep 22, 2010	Unreleased	Unreleased	Unreleased	XBLA		
Blades of Time	Action, hack and slash	Gaijin Entertainment	Konami	Mar 6, 2012	Mar 16, 2012	Mar 8, 2012	Mar 8, 2012			
Bladestorm: The Hundred Years' War	RTT	Omega Force	Koei	Nov 6, 2007	Nov 2, 2007	Oct 25, 2007	Nov 15, 2007			
BlazBlue: Calamity Trigger	Fighting	Arc System Works	Arc System Works	Jul 30, 2009	Apr 2, 2010	Jun 25, 2009	Mar 26, 2010			
BlazBlue: Continuum Shift	Fighting	Arc System Works	Arc System Works	Jul 27, 2010	Dec 3, 2010	Jul 1, 2010	Dec 3, 2010			
BlazBlue: Continuum Shift Extend	Fighting, update	Arc System Works	Arc System Works	Feb 14, 2012	Feb 22, 2012	Dec 17, 2011	Unreleased			
Blazing Angels 2: Secret Missions of WWII	Combat flight simulation game	Ubisoft Bucharest	Ubisoft	Sep 18, 2007	Sep 7, 2007	Mar 19, 2008	Sep 6, 2007			
Blazing Angels: Squadrons of WWII	Combat flight simulation game	Ubisoft Bucharest	Ubisoft	Mar 23, 2006	Mar 31, 2006	Unreleased	Mar 30, 2006		XBO	
Blazing Birds	Sports & recreation	Vector 2 Games	Microsoft Game Studios	May 20, 2009	Unreleased	Unreleased	Unreleased	XBLA		
Bliss Island	Puzzle & trivia	PomPom Games	Codemasters	Mar 12, 2008	Unreleased	Unreleased	Unreleased	XBLA		
Blitz: The League	Sports	Midway Games	Midway Games	Nov 13, 2006	Feb 23, 2007	Unreleased	Unreleased			
Blitz: The League II	Sports	Midway Games	Midway Games	Oct 13, 2008	Oct 24, 2008	Unreleased	Unreleased			
Blood Bowl	Sports, RTS, Turn-based strategy	Cyanide	Focus Home Interactive	Jan 26, 2010	Nov 27, 2009	Unreleased	Dec 10, 2009			
Blood Drive	Vehicular combat	Sidhe	Activision	Nov 2, 2010	Nov 19, 2010	Unreleased	Unreleased			
Blood Knights	Action & adventure	Deck13 Interactive	Kalypso Media	Nov 1, 2013	Unreleased	Unreleased	Unreleased	XBLA	XBO	
Blood of the Werewolf	Platformer	Scientifically Proven	Midnight City	Jun 11, 2014	Unreleased	Unreleased	Unreleased	XBLA	XBO	
Bloodbath	Fighting	Freedom Factory Studios	Freedom Factory Studios	Unreleased	Aug 1, 2014	Unreleased	Unreleased			
Bloodforge	Action & adventure	Climax Studios	Microsoft Studios	Apr 25, 2012	Unreleased	Unreleased	Unreleased	XBLA	XBO	
BloodRayne: Betrayal	Platformer	WayForward Technologies	Majesco	Sep 7, 2011	Unreleased	Unreleased	Unreleased	XBLA	XBO	
Bloody Good Time	Shooter	Outerlight	Ubisoft	Oct 28, 2010	Unreleased	Unreleased	Unreleased	XBLA		
Blue Dragon	Role-playing	Mistwalker	Microsoft Game Studios	Aug 28, 2007	Aug 24, 2007	Dec 7, 2006	Aug 30, 2007		XBO	
The Bluecoats: North vs South	Strategy & simulation	Anuman	Bandai Namco Entertainment	Sep 13, 2016	Unreleased	Unreleased	Unreleased	XBLA		
Blur	Racing, vehicular combat	Bizarre Creations	Activision	May 25, 2010	May 28, 2010	Jul 22, 2010	May 26, 2010			
Body and Brain Connection	Puzzle	Namco Bandai Games	Namco Bandai Games	Feb 8, 2011	Feb 11, 2011	Feb 10, 2011	Nov 20, 2010	K		
Bodycount	First-person shooter	Guildford Studio	Codemasters	Aug 30, 2011	Sep 2, 2011	Unreleased	Sep 1, 2011			
Bolt	Adventure	Avalanche Software	Disney Interactive Studios	Nov 18, 2008	Feb 13, 2009	Unreleased	Dec 4, 2008		XBO	
Bomberman Live	Action & adventure	Backbone Entertainment	Hudson Soft	Jul 18, 2007	Unreleased	Unreleased	Unreleased	XBLA		
Bomberman Live: Battlefest	Action & adventure	Pi Studios	Hudson Soft	Dec 8, 2010	Unreleased	Unreleased	Unreleased	XBLA	XBO	
Bomberman: Act Zero	Action	Hudson Soft	Konami, Hudson Soft^{JP}	Aug 29, 2006	Nov 3, 2006	Aug 3, 2006	Nov 10, 2006			
Boogie Bunnies	Puzzle & trivia	Artech Digital Entertainment	Vivendi Games	Jan 16, 2008	Unreleased	Unreleased	Unreleased	XBLA		
Boom Boom Rocket	Action & adventure	Bizarre Creations	Electronic Arts	Apr 11, 2007	Unreleased	Unreleased	Unreleased	XBLA	XBO	
Borderlands (Note: The Retail downloadable content packs which includes the first two episodes of Borderlands DLC: The Zombie Island of Doctor Ned and Mad Moxxi's Underdome Riot was released on February 23, 2010.) (Note: Borderlands: Game of the Year Edition was released on October 12, 2010 in North America. It combined Borderlands, The Zombie Island of Dr. Ned, Mad Moxxi's Underdome Riot, The Secret Armory of General Knoxx and Claptrap's New Robot Revolution into one game.)	Action role-playing, First-person shooter	Gearbox Software	2K Games	Oct 20, 2009	Oct 23, 2009	Feb 25, 2010	Oct 23, 2009		XBO	
Borderlands 2	Action role-playing, First-person shooter	Gearbox Software	2K Games	Sep 18, 2012	Sep 21, 2012	Oct 25, 2012	Sep 20, 2012		XBO	
Borderlands: The Pre-Sequel	Action role-playing, First-person shooter	2K Australia	2K Games	Oct 14, 2014	Oct 17, 2014	Oct 30, 2014	Oct 16, 2014			
Boulder Dash-XL	Puzzle	Catnip Games	Kalypso Media	Jul 13, 2011	Unreleased	Unreleased	Unreleased	XBLA		
Bound by Flame	Action role-playing	Spiders	Focus Home Interactive	May 9, 2014	May 9, 2014	Unreleased	Unreleased		XBO	
Braid	Action & adventure	Number None, Inc.	Microsoft Game Studios	Aug 6, 2008	Unreleased	Unreleased	Unreleased	XBLA	XBO	
Brain Challenge	Puzzle & trivia	Gameloft	Microsoft Game Studios	Mar 12, 2008	Unreleased	Unreleased	Unreleased	XBLA	XBO	
Brave	Action-adventure	Behaviour Interactive	Disney Interactive Studios	Jun 19, 2012	Jul 27, 2012	Unreleased	Jun 21, 2012	K	XBO	
Brave: A Warrior's Tale	Action-adventure	Collision Studios	SouthPeak Games	Aug 4, 2009	Sep 25, 2009	Unreleased	Unreleased			
Breach	Shooter	Atomic Games	Atomic Games	Jan 26, 2011	Unreleased	Unreleased	Unreleased	XBLA		
Brian Lara International Cricket 2007	Sports	Codemasters	Codemasters	Unreleased	Mar 23, 2007	Unreleased	Mar 29, 2007			
The Bridge	Puzzle & trivia	Ty Taylor and Mario Castañeda	Midnight City	Nov 13, 2013	Unreleased	Unreleased	Unreleased	XBLA		
Brink	First-person shooter	Splash Damage	Bethesda Softworks	May 10, 2011	May 13, 2011	Jun 16, 2011	May 12, 2011			
Brothers in Arms: Hell's Highway	First-person shooter	Gearbox Software	Ubisoft	Sep 23, 2008	Sep 26, 2008	Oct 30, 2008	Sep 25, 2008		XBO	
Brothers: A Tale of Two Sons	Action & adventure	Starbreeze Studios	505 Games	Aug 7, 2013	Aug 7, 2013	Aug 7, 2013	Aug 7, 2013	XBLA		
Brunswick Pro Bowling	Sports, bowling	FarSight Studios	Crave Entertainment, 505 Games	Feb 15, 2011	Apr 8, 2011	Dec 16, 2010	Unreleased	K		
Brütal Legend	Action-adventure, RTS	Double Fine Productions	Electronic Arts	Oct 13, 2009	Oct 16, 2009	Unreleased	Oct 15, 2009		XBO	
Bubble Bobble Neo!	Action & adventure	Dreams	Square Enix	Sep 16, 2009	Unreleased	Unreleased	Unreleased	XBLA		
Buku Sudoku	Puzzle & trivia	Absolutist	Microsoft Game Studios	May 28, 2008	Unreleased	Unreleased	Unreleased	XBLA		
Bullet Soul	Shoot 'em up	5pb.	5pb.	Sep 16, 2016	Unreleased	Apr 7, 2011	Unreleased		XBO	
Bullet Soul: Infinite Burst	Shoot 'em up, update	5pb.	5pb.	Nov 1, 2016	Unreleased	May 29, 2014	Unreleased		XBO	
Bullet Witch	Third-person shooter	Cavia	Atari, AQ Interactive^{JP}	Feb 27, 2007	Mar 6, 2007	Jul 27, 2006	Mar 16, 2007			
Bulletstorm	First-person shooter	People Can Fly	Electronic Arts	Feb 22, 2011	Feb 25, 2011	Feb 24, 2011	Feb 24, 2011			
Bully: Scholarship Edition	Action-adventure	Rockstar New England	Rockstar Games	Mar 4, 2008	Mar 7, 2008	Jul 24, 2008	Mar 7, 2008		XBO	
The Bureau: XCOM Declassified	Tactical shooter	2K Marin, 2K Australia, 2K China	2K Games	Aug 20, 2013	Aug 23, 2013	Unreleased	Aug 23, 2013		XBO	
BurgerTime World Tour	Platformer	Frozen Codebase	Konami	Nov 2, 2011	Unreleased	Unreleased	Unreleased	XBLA		
Burnout Crash!	Racing	Criterion Games	Electronic Arts	Sep 21, 2011	Unreleased	Unreleased	Unreleased	K XBLA		
Burnout Paradise	Racing	Criterion Games	Electronic Arts	Jan 22, 2008	Jan 25, 2008	Feb 21, 2008	Feb 7, 2008		XBO	
Burnout Revenge	Racing	Criterion Games	Electronic Arts	Mar 7, 2006	Mar 17, 2006	Mar 23, 2006	Mar 17, 2006		XBO	
Cabela's Adventure Camp	Hunting/fishing	Cauldron	Activision	Nov 1, 2011	Nov 1, 2011	Unreleased	Unreleased	K		
Cabela's African Adventures	Hunting/fishing	Fun Labs	Activision	Oct 15, 2013	Oct 15, 2013	Unreleased	Unreleased			
Cabela's African Safari	Hunting/fishing	Fun Labs	Activision	Nov 21, 2006	May 4, 2007	Unreleased	Unreleased			
Cabela's Alaskan Adventures	Hunting/fishing	Fun Labs	Activision	Sep 19, 2006	Nov 16, 2006	Unreleased	Unreleased		XBO	
Cabela's Big Game Hunter	Hunting/fishing	Fun Labs	Activision	Nov 6, 2007	Mar 5, 2008	Unreleased	Unreleased			
Cabela's Big Game Hunter 2010	Hunting/fishing	Cauldron	Activision	Sep 22, 2009	Sep 22, 2009	Unreleased	Unreleased			
Cabela's Big Game Hunter 2012	Hunting/fishing	Cauldron	Activision	Sep 27, 2011	Sep 27, 2011	Unreleased	Unreleased			
Cabela's Big Game Hunter: Hunting Party	Hunting/fishing	Activision	Activision	Nov 1, 2011	Nov 1, 2011	Unreleased	Unreleased	K		
Cabela's Big Game Hunter: Pro Hunts	Hunting/fishing	Cauldron	Activision	Mar 25, 2014	Mar 25, 2014	Unreleased	Unreleased			
Cabela's Dangerous Hunts 2009	Hunting/fishing	Fun Labs	Activision	Sep 23, 2008	Nov 20, 2008	Unreleased	Unreleased			
Cabela's Dangerous Hunts 2011	Hunting/fishing	Cauldron	Activision	Oct 26, 2010	May 6, 2011	Unreleased	Unreleased			
Cabela's Dangerous Hunts 2013	Hunting/fishing	Cauldron	Activision	Oct 23, 2012	Oct 23, 2012	Unreleased	Unreleased		XBO	
Cabela's Hunting Expeditions	Hunting/fishing	Fun Labs	Activision	Oct 23, 2012	Oct 23, 2012	Unreleased	Unreleased		XBO	
Cabela's North American Adventures	Hunting/fishing	Fun Labs	Activision	Sep 14, 2010	Sep 14, 2010	Unreleased	Unreleased			
Cabela's Outdoor Adventures	Hunting/fishing	Activision	Activision	Sep 9, 2009	Sep 9, 2009	Unreleased	Unreleased			
Cabela's Survival: Shadows of Katmai	Hunting/fishing	Fun Labs	Activision	May 1, 2012	May 1, 2012	Unreleased	Unreleased		XBO	
Cabela's Trophy Bucks	Hunting/fishing	Fun Labs	Activision	Sep 25, 2007	Sep 25, 2007	Unreleased	Unreleased			
Caladrius	Vertically scrolling shooter	MOSS	MOSS	Sep 4, 2015	Sep 4, 2015	Apr 25, 2013	Unreleased			
Call of Duty 2 (Note: Call of Duty 2: Game of the Year Edition was released on May 26, 2006 with some additional content not included in the original game. This extra content was also made available on the Xbox Live Marketplace.)	First-person shooter	Infinity Ward	Activision	Nov 22, 2005	Dec 2, 2005	Jun 15, 2006	Mar 23, 2006		XBO	
Call of Duty 3	First-person shooter	Treyarch	Activision	Nov 7, 2006	Nov 10, 2006	Mar 29, 2007	Nov 15, 2006		XBO	
Call of Duty 4: Modern Warfare	First-person shooter	Infinity Ward	Activision	Nov 5, 2007	Nov 9, 2007	Dec 27, 2007	Nov 7, 2007		XBO	
Call of Duty Classic	Classics	Aspyr	Activision	Dec 2, 2009	Unreleased	Unreleased	Unreleased	XBLA		
Call of Duty: Advanced Warfare	First-person shooter	Sledgehammer Games, High Moon Studios	Activision	Nov 4, 2014	Nov 4, 2014	Nov 13, 2014	Nov 4, 2014		XBO	
Call of Duty: Black Ops	First-person shooter	Treyarch	Activision	Nov 9, 2010	Nov 9, 2010	Nov 18, 2010	Nov 9, 2010	3D	XBO	
Call of Duty: Black Ops II	First-person shooter	Treyarch	Activision	Nov 13, 2012	Nov 13, 2012	Nov 22, 2012	Nov 13, 2012	3D	XBO	
Call of Duty: Black Ops III	First-person shooter	Treyarch, Beenox	Activision	Nov 6, 2015	Nov 6, 2015	Nov 6, 2015	Nov 6, 2015			
Call of Duty: Ghosts	First-person shooter	Infinity Ward	Activision, Square Enix^{JP}	Nov 5, 2013	Nov 5, 2013	Nov 14, 2013	Nov 5, 2013		XBO	
Call of Duty: Modern Warfare 2	First-person shooter	Infinity Ward	Activision	Nov 10, 2009	Nov 10, 2009	Dec 10, 2009	Nov 10, 2009		XBO	
Call of Duty: Modern Warfare 3	First-person shooter	Infinity Ward, Sledgehammer Games	Activision	Nov 8, 2011	Nov 8, 2011	Nov 17, 2011	Nov 8, 2011		XBO	
Call of Duty: World at War	First-person shooter	Treyarch	Activision	Nov 11, 2008	Nov 14, 2008	Unreleased	Nov 12, 2008		XBO	
Call of Juarez	First-person shooter, Western	Techland	Ubisoft	Jun 5, 2007	Jun 29, 2007	Feb 28, 2008	Jun 29, 2007			
Call of Juarez: Bound in Blood	First-person shooter, Western	Techland	Ubisoft	Jun 30, 2009	Jul 3, 2009	Jul 23, 2009	Jul 2, 2009		XBO	
Call of Juarez: The Cartel	First-person shooter, Western	Techland	Ubisoft	Jul 19, 2011	Jul 22, 2011	Oct 13, 2011	Jul 21, 2011		XBO	
Call of Juarez: Gunslinger	Shooter	Techland	Ubisoft	May 22, 2013	Unreleased	Unreleased	Unreleased	XBLA	XBO	
Capcom Arcade Cabinet	Classics	Capcom, M2	Capcom	Feb 19, 2013	Feb 20, 2013	Feb 19, 2013	Feb 20, 2013	XBLA	XBO	
Capcom Digital Collection (Note: Capcom Digital Collection is a compilation of eight XBLA titles)	Compilation	Capcom	Capcom	Mar 27, 2012	Mar 30, 2012	Unreleased	Mar 30, 2012			
Capsized	Action & adventure	Alientrap	Namco Bandai Games	Jul 5, 2013	Unreleased	Unreleased	Unreleased	XBLA		
Captain America: Super Soldier	Action	Next Level Games	Sega	Jul 19, 2011	Jul 15, 2011	Unreleased	Jul 15, 2011	3D		
Carcassonne	Card & board	Sierra Entertainment	Microsoft Game Studios	Jun 27, 2007	Unreleased	Unreleased	Unreleased	XBLA	XBO	
Carnival Games: Monkey See, Monkey Do	Party	Cat Daddy Games	2K Play	Apr 5, 2011	Apr 8, 2011	Apr 8, 2011	Unreleased	K		
Carrier Command: Gaea Mission	Real-time strategy, action	Bohemia Interactive	Bohemia Interactive, Mastertronic, Rising Star Games	Sep 28, 2012	Sep 28, 2012	Unreleased	Sep 28, 2012			
Cars	Racing, adventure	Rainbow Studios	THQ	Oct 23, 2006	Nov 17, 2006	Unreleased	Nov 23, 2006			
Cars 2	Racing, adventure	Avalanche Software	Disney Interactive Studios	Jun 21, 2011	Jul 22, 2011	Unreleased	June 23, 2011		XBO	
Cars 3: Driven to Win	Racing	Avalanche Software	Warner Bros. Interactive Entertainment	Jun 13, 2017	Jul 14, 2017	Unreleased	Jul 14, 2017			
Cars Mater-National Championship	Racing	Rainbow Studios	THQ	Oct 29, 2007	Nov 16, 2007	Unreleased	Nov 29, 2007		XBO	
Cars Race-O-Rama	Racing	Rainbow Studios	THQ	Oct 13, 2009	Oct 30, 2009	Unreleased	Oct 30, 2009			
Cartoon Network: Punch Time Explosion XL	Fighting	Papaya Studio	Crave Games ^{NA}, OG International ^{EU}	Nov 15, 2011	May 18, 2012	Unreleased	May 18, 2012			
Castle Crashers	Role playing	The Behemoth	Microsoft Game Studios	Aug 27, 2008	Aug 27, 2008	Unreleased	Aug 27, 2008	XBLA	XBO	
Castle of Illusion Starring Mickey Mouse	Action & adventure	Sega Studios Australia	Sega	Sep 4, 2013	Unreleased	Unreleased	Unreleased	XBLA	XBO	
CastleStorm	Strategy & simulation	Zen Studios	Microsoft Studios	May 29, 2013	Unreleased	Unreleased	Unreleased	XBLA	XBO	
Castlevania: Harmony of Despair	Action & adventure	Konami	Konami	Aug 4, 2010	Aug 4, 2010	Aug 4, 2010	Aug 4, 2010	XBLA	XBO	
Castlevania: Lords of Shadow	Action-adventure, Platformer	MercurySteam, Kojima Productions	Konami	Oct 5, 2010	Oct 8, 2010	Dec 16, 2010	Oct 19, 2010		XBO	
Castlevania: Lords of Shadow 2	Action-adventure, Platformer	MercurySteam, Kojima Productions	Konami	Feb 25, 2014	Feb 28, 2014	Sep 4, 2014	Mar 6, 2014		XBO	
Castlevania: Lords of Shadow – Mirror of Fate HD	Action & adventure	MercurySteam	Konami	Oct 25, 2013	Oct 25, 2013	Oct 25, 2013	Oct 25, 2013	XBLA	XBO	
Castlevania: Symphony of the Night	Classics	Konami/Digital Eclipse	Konami	Mar 21, 2007	Mar 21, 2007	Mar 21, 2007	Mar 21, 2007	XBLA	XBO	
Catan	Card & board	Big Huge Games	Microsoft Game Studios	May 2, 2007	Unreleased	Unreleased	Unreleased	XBLA		
Catherine	Puzzle Platform, survival horror, adult	Atlus Persona Team	Atlus	Jul 26, 2011	Feb 10, 2012	Feb 17, 2011	Feb 23, 2012		XBO	
The Cave	Action & adventure	Double Fine Productions	Sega	Jan 23, 2013	Unreleased	Unreleased	Unreleased	XBLA	XBO	
CellFactor: Psychokinetic Wars	Shooter	Immersion Games; Timeline Interactive	Ubisoft	Jun 3, 2009	Unreleased	Unreleased	Unreleased	XBLA		
Centipede & Millipede	Classics	Stainless Games	Atari	May 2, 2007	Unreleased	Unreleased	Unreleased	XBLA	XBO	
Champion Jockey: G1 Jockey & Gallop Racer	Horse Racing	Koei	Tecmo Koei	Unreleased	Sep 2, 2011	Sep 22, 2011	Sep 22, 2011	K		
Championship Manager 2007	Sports, Sports management	Beautiful Game	Eidos Interactive	Unreleased	Mar 16, 2007	Unreleased	Apr 13, 2007			
Chaos;Head Love Chu Chu!	Visual novel, romantic comedy	5pb.	5pb.	Unreleased	Unreleased	Mar 25, 2010	Unreleased			
Chaos;Head Noah	Visual novel	5pb.	5pb.	Unreleased	Unreleased	Feb 26, 2009	Unreleased			
Chaotic: Shadow Warriors	Action	Activision	Activision	Nov 10, 2009	Unreleased	Unreleased	Unreleased			
Charlie Murder	Fighting	Ska Studios	Microsoft Studios	Aug 14, 2013	Unreleased	Unreleased	Unreleased	XBLA		
Chessmaster Live	Card & board	Ubisoft	Ubisoft	Jan 30, 2008	Unreleased	Unreleased	Unreleased	XBLA		
Child of Eden	Rail shooter, music	Q Entertainment	Ubisoft	Jun 14, 2011	Jun 17, 2011	Oct 6, 2011	Jun 16, 2011	K	XBO	
Child of Light	Role playing	Ubisoft Montreal	Ubisoft	Apr 30, 2014	Unreleased	Unreleased	Unreleased	XBLA		
Chime	Puzzle & trivia	Zoë Mode	Valcon Games	Feb 3, 2010	Unreleased	Unreleased	Unreleased	XBLA		
Chivalry: Medieval Warfare	Fighting	Torn Banner Studios	Activision	Dec 3, 2014	Unreleased	Unreleased	Unreleased	XBLA		
Choplifter HD	Action & adventure	InXile Entertainment	Konami	Jan 11, 2012	Unreleased	Unreleased	Unreleased	XBLA		
Chromehounds	Tank & Mecha Sim	From Software	Sega	Jul 11, 2006	Jul 7, 2006	Jun 29, 2006	Jul 18, 2006			
The Chronicles of Narnia: Prince Caspian	Action-adventure	Traveller's Tales	Disney Interactive Studios	May 15, 2008	Jun 20, 2008	Unreleased	Jun 12, 2008			
The Chronicles of Riddick: Assault on Dark Athena	First-person shooter, action-adventure, stealth	Starbreeze Studios	Atari	Apr 7, 2009	Apr 24, 2009	Unreleased	Apr 24, 2009			
Civilization Revolution	Turn-based Strategy	Firaxis Games	2K Games	Jul 8, 2008	Jun 13, 2008	Dec 11, 2008	Jun 13, 2008		XBO XE	
Clannad	Visual novel	Key	Prototype	Unreleased	Unreleased	Aug 26, 2008	Unreleased			
Clash of the Titans	Action-adventure	Namco Bandai Games	Namco Bandai Games	Jul 27, 2010	May 28, 2010	Jun 17, 2010	Jun 3, 2010			
Clive Barker's Jericho	First-person shooter; survival horror	MercurySteam; Alchemic Productions	Codemasters	Oct 23, 2007	Oct 26, 2007	Unreleased	Nov 8, 2008			
Cloning Clyde	Platformer	NinjaBee	Microsoft Game Studios	Jul 19, 2006	Unreleased	Unreleased	Unreleased	XBLA		
Cloudberry Kingdom	Platformer	Pwnee Studios	Ubisoft	Jul 31, 2013	Unreleased	Unreleased	Unreleased	XBLA		
Cloudy with a Chance of Meatballs	Platform	Ubisoft Shanghai	Ubisoft	Sep 18, 2009	Sep 11, 2009	Unreleased	Nov 19, 2009			
The Club	Third-person shooter	Bizarre Creations	Sega	Feb 19, 2008	Feb 8, 2008	Unreleased	Feb 7, 2008			
Cobalt	Puzzle & trivia	Oxeye Game Studio	Microsoft Studios	Feb 2, 2016	Unreleased	Unreleased	Unreleased	XBLA	XBO	
Code 18	Visual novel	CyberFront	CyberFront	Unreleased	Unreleased	Sep 29, 2011	Unreleased			
Coffeetime Crosswords	Puzzle & trivia	Voltex	Konami	Jul 16, 2008	Unreleased	Unreleased	Unreleased	XBLA		
College Hoops 2K6	Sports	Visual Concepts	2K Sports	Mar 7, 2006	Mar 7, 2006	Unreleased	Mar 23, 2006			
College Hoops 2K7	Sports	Visual Concepts	2K Sports	Nov 20, 2006	Unreleased	Unreleased	Unreleased			
College Hoops 2K8	Sports	Visual Concepts	2K Sports	Nov 19, 2007	Unreleased	Unreleased	Unreleased			
Combat Wings: The Great Battles of World War II	Combat flight simulation game	CI Games	CI Games	Mar 27, 2012	Feb 19, 2012	Feb 14, 2013	Mar 29, 2012			
Comic Jumper: The Adventures of Captain Smiley	Platformer	Twisted Pixel Games	Microsoft Game Studios	Oct 6, 2010	Unreleased	Unreleased	Unreleased	XBLA	XBO	
Comix Zone	Classics	Backbone Entertainment	Sega	Jun 10, 2009	Unreleased	Unreleased	Unreleased	XBLA	XBO	
Command & Conquer 3: Kane's Wrath	RTS	EA Los Angeles	Electronic Arts	Jun 23, 2008	Jun 27, 2008	Unreleased	Jun 26, 2008		XBO	
Command & Conquer 3: Tiberium Wars	RTS	EA Los Angeles	Electronic Arts	May 8, 2007	May 11, 2007	Unreleased	May 10, 2007		XBO	
Command & Conquer: Red Alert 3	RTS	EA Los Angeles	Electronic Arts	Nov 11, 2008	Nov 14, 2008	Unreleased	Nov 13, 2008		XBO	
Command & Conquer: Red Alert 3 – Commander's Challenge	Strategy & simulation	EA Los Angeles	Electronic Arts	Sep 16, 2009	Unreleased	Unreleased	Unreleased	XBLA	XBO	
Commanders: Attack of the Genos	Platformer	Southend Interactive	Activision	Feb 13, 2008	Unreleased	Unreleased	Unreleased	XBLA	XBO	
Conan	Action-adventure, platformer	Nihilistic Software	THQ	Oct 23, 2007	Sep 28, 2007	Dec 6, 2007	Oct 11, 2007			
Condemned 2: Bloodshot	Survival Horror	Monolith Productions	Sega	Mar 11, 2008	Apr 4, 2008	Unreleased	Mar 27, 2008			
Condemned: Criminal Origins (Note: Known simply as Condemned in Europe and Condemned: Psycho Crime in Asia and Japan.)	Survival horror	Monolith Productions	Sega	Nov 22, 2005	Dec 2, 2005	Aug 31, 2006	Mar 23, 2006		XBO	
Conflict: Denied Ops	Tactical shooter	Pivotal Games	Eidos Interactive	Feb 12, 2008	Feb 8, 2008	Jan 16, 2009	Feb 21, 2008			
Constant C	Platformer	International Games System	Mages	Mar 12, 2014	Unreleased	Unreleased	Unreleased	XBLA		
Contra	Classics	Konami/Digital Eclipse	Konami	Nov 8, 2006	Unreleased	Unreleased	Unreleased	XBLA	XBO	
Contrast	Action & adventure	Compulsion Games	Focus Home Interactive	Nov 15, 2013	Unreleased	Unreleased	Unreleased	XBLA		
Costume Quest	Action & adventure	Double Fine Productions	THQ	Oct 20, 2010	Unreleased	Unreleased	Unreleased	XBLA	XBO	
Costume Quest 2	Action & adventure	Double Fine Productions	Midnight City	Oct 29, 2014	Unreleased	Unreleased	Unreleased	XBLA	XBO	
Counter-Strike: Global Offensive	Shooter	Valve	Valve	Aug 22, 2012	Unreleased	Unreleased	Unreleased	XBLA	XBO	
Country Dance All Stars	Music, rhythm	High Voltage Software	GameMill Entertainment	Mar 27, 2012	Unreleased	Unreleased	Unreleased	K		
The Conveni 200X	Sim	Masterpiece	Hamster Corporation	Unreleased	Unreleased	Mar 30, 2006	Unreleased			
Crackdown	Third-person shooter, action-adventure, open world	Real Time Worlds	Microsoft Game Studios	Feb 20, 2007	Feb 23, 2007	Feb 22, 2007	Feb 22, 2007		XBO XE	
Crackdown 2	Third-person shooter, open world	Ruffian Games	Microsoft Game Studios	Jul 6, 2010	Jul 9, 2010	Jul 8, 2010	Jul 8, 2010		XBO	
Crash of the Titans	Platform	Radical Entertainment	Vivendi Games	Oct 4, 2007	Oct 12, 2007	Unreleased	Oct 18, 2007			
Crash Time II: Burning Wheels	Racing Mission	Synetic	RTL Games	Unreleased	Nov 27, 2008	Unreleased	Unreleased			
Crash Time III: Highway Nights	Racing Mission	Synetic	RTL Games	Unreleased	Nov 19, 2009	Unreleased	Unreleased			
Crash Time IV: The Syndicate	Racing Mission	Synetic	dtp entertainment	Unreleased	Jan 24, 2012	Unreleased	Unreleased			
Crash Time V: Undercover	Racing Mission	Synetic	dtp entertainment	Unreleased	May 17, 2013	Unreleased	Unreleased			
Crash Time: Autobahn Pursuit	Racing Mission	Synetic	Crave Entertainment, RTL Games^{EU}	Aug 5, 2008	May 9, 2008	Unreleased	Unreleased			
Crash: Mind over Mutant	Platform	Radical Entertainment	Activision; Vivendi Games	Oct 7, 2008	Oct 31, 2008	Unreleased	Oct 29, 2008			
Crazy Machines Elements	Puzzle & trivia	FAKT Software	dtp entertainment	Aug 24, 2011	Unreleased	Unreleased	Unreleased	XBLA		
Crazy Taxi	Racing & flying	Hitmaker	Sega	Nov 24, 2010	Unreleased	Unreleased	Unreleased	XBLA	XBO	
Crazy Mouse	Action & adventure	Ultizen Games	Microsoft Game Studios	Oct 15, 2008	Unreleased	Unreleased	Unreleased	XBLA		
Create	Open world	EA Bright Light	Electronic Arts	Nov 16, 2010	Nov 19, 2010	Unreleased	Nov 19, 2010			
The Crew	Racing	Ivory Tower, Ubisoft Reflections, Asobo Studio	Ubisoft	Dec 2, 2014	Dec 2, 2014	Dec 4, 2014	Dec 2, 2014			
Crimson Alliance	Role-playing	Certain Affinity	Microsoft Studios	Sep 7, 2011	Unreleased	Unreleased	Unreleased	XBLA		
Cross Channel: In Memory of All People	Visual novel	Flying Shine	Cyberfront	Unreleased	Unreleased	Apr 14, 2011	Unreleased			
Cross Edge Dash	Tactical Role-playing	Compile Heart	Compile Heart	Unreleased	Unreleased	Nov 30, 2010	Unreleased			
Crysis	First-person shooter	Crytek	Electronic Arts	Oct 4, 2011	Oct 4, 2011	Oct 4, 2011	Oct 4, 2011	3D	XBO	
Crysis 2	First-person shooter	Crytek	Electronic Arts	Mar 22, 2011	Mar 25, 2011	Apr 1, 2011	Mar 24, 2011	3D	XBO	
Crysis 3	First-person shooter	Crytek	Electronic Arts	Feb 19, 2013	Feb 22, 2013	Mar 7, 2013	Feb 21, 2013	3D	XBO	
Crystal Defenders	Strategy & simulation	Square Enix	Square Enix	Mar 11, 2009	Unreleased	Unreleased	Unreleased	XBLA	XBO	
Crystal Quest	Shooter	Stainless Games	Microsoft Game Studios	Feb 7, 2006	Unreleased	Unreleased	Unreleased	XBLA	XBO	
CSI: Deadly Intent	Adventure	Telltale Games	Ubisoft	Oct 27, 2009	Oct 30, 2009	Unreleased	Unreleased			
CSI: Fatal Conspiracy	Adventure	Telltale Games	Ubisoft	Oct 26, 2010	Oct 29, 2010	Unreleased	Nov 25, 2010			
CSI: Hard Evidence	Adventure	Telltale Games	Ubisoft	Sep 25, 2007	Oct 5, 2007	Unreleased	Oct 11, 2007			
Culdcept Saga	Board game, card based	Omiya Soft, Jamsworks	Namco Bandai Games	Feb 5, 2008	Unreleased	Sep 30, 2006	Unreleased			
The Cursed Crusade	Action-adventure, third-person	Kylotonn Games	Atlus	Oct 25, 2011	Oct 11, 2011	Unreleased	Oct 25, 2011			
Cyber Troopers Virtual-On	Tank & mecha sim, action	Hitmaker	Sega	Unreleased	Unreleased	Feb 13, 2013	Unreleased	XBLA	XBO	
Cyber Troopers Virtual-On Force	Tank & mecha sim, action	Hitmaker	Sega	Unreleased	Unreleased	Dec 22, 2010	Unreleased			
Cyber Troopers Virtual-On Oratorio Tangram	Tank & mecha sim, action	Sega AM-2	Sega	Apr 29, 2009	Apr 29, 2009	Apr 29, 2009	Apr 29, 2009	XBLA	XBO	
Cyberball 2072	Classics	Midway Games/ Digital Eclipse	Midway Games	Sep 5, 2007	Unreleased	Unreleased	Unreleased	XBLA		
Damage Inc. Pacific Squadron WW2	Combat flight simulation game	Trickstar Games	Mad Catz Interactive	Aug 28, 2012	Aug 28, 2012	Unreleased	Aug 28, 2012			
Damnation	Third-person shooter	Blue Omega	Codemasters	May 26, 2009	May 22, 2009	Unreleased	June 4, 2009			
Dance Central	Music, rhythm	Harmonix Music Systems	MTV Games	Nov 4, 2010	Nov 10, 2010	Nov 18, 2010	Jun 2, 2011	K		
Dance Central 2	Music, rhythm	Harmonix Music Systems	MTV Games	Oct 25, 2011	Oct 21, 2011	Oct 21, 2011	Oct 27, 2011	K		
Dance Central 3	Music, rhythm	Harmonix Music Systems	MTV Games and Microsoft Studios	Oct 16, 2012	Oct 19, 2012	Oct 19, 2012	Oct 19, 2012	K		
Dance Dance Revolution	Music	Konami	Konami	Apr 12, 2011	Unreleased	Unreleased	Unreleased			
Dance Dance Revolution Universe (Note: Known as Dancing Stage Universe in Europe and Australia.)	Music	Konami	Konami	Feb 27, 2007	Dec 12, 2007	Unreleased	Dec 12, 2007			
Dance Dance Revolution Universe 2 (Note: Known as Dancing Stage Universe 2 in Europe.)	Music	Konami	Konami	Dec 4, 2007	Nov 18, 2008	Unreleased	Nov 18, 2008			
Dance Dance Revolution Universe 3	Music	Konami	Konami	Oct 14, 2008	Unreleased	Unreleased	Unreleased			
Dance Evolution (DanceMasters in NA)	Music, rhythm	Konami	Konami	Nov 4, 2010	Nov 10, 2010	Nov 18, 2010	Nov 20, 2010	K		
Dance Paradise	Music, rhythm	Mindscape	Universal Music	Feb 15, 2011	Nov 19, 2010	Nov 18, 2010	Unreleased	K		
Dance! It's Your Stage	Family & educational	Sproing	dtp entertainment	Sep 8, 2009	Unreleased	Unreleased	Unreleased	XBLA		
Dante's Inferno	Platformer, hack and slash, action-adventure, third-person	EA Redwood Shores	Electronic Arts	Feb 9, 2010	Feb 5, 2010	Feb 18, 2010	Feb 4, 2010		XBO	
Dark	Stealth, action role-playing	Realmforge Studios	Kalypso Media	Jul 9, 2013	Jul 5, 2013	Unreleased	Jul 18, 2013			
Dark Messiah of Might and Magic: Elements	First-person shooter, action role-playing	Ubisoft Annecy	Ubisoft	Feb 12, 2008	Feb 15, 2008	Jul 17, 2008	Feb 14, 2008			
Dark Sector	Third-person shooter, action	Digital Extremes	D3 Publisher	Mar 22, 2008	Apr 4, 2008	Mar 27, 2008	Unreleased			
Dark Souls	Action Role-playing	FromSoftware	Namco Bandai Games, FromSoftware^{JP}	Oct 4, 2011	Oct 7, 2011	Unreleased	Oct 6, 2011		XBO	
Dark Souls II	Action Role-playing	FromSoftware	Namco Bandai Games, From Software^{JP}	Mar 11, 2014	Mar 14, 2014	Mar 13, 2014	Mar 13, 2014			
Dark Void	Third-person shooter, action-adventure	Airtight Games	Capcom	Jan 19, 2010	Jan 22, 2010	Unreleased	Jan 21, 2010		XBO	
Darkest of Days	First-person shooter	8monkey Labs	Phantom EFX	Sep 8, 2009	Unreleased	Unreleased	Unreleased			
The Darkness	First-person shooter, survival horror	Starbreeze Studios	2K Games	Jun 25, 2007	Jun 29, 2007	May 15, 2008	Jun 28, 2007		XBO	
The Darkness II	First-person shooter	Digital Extremes, Top Cow Productions	2K Games	Feb 7, 2012	Feb 10, 2012	Feb 23, 2012	Feb 9, 2012		XBO	
Darksiders	Hack & Slash, action-adventure	Vigil Games	THQ	Jan 5, 2010	Jan 8, 2010	Mar 18, 2010	Jan 7, 2010		XBO XE	
Darksiders II	Hack & Slash, action-adventure	Vigil Games	THQ	Aug 14, 2012	Aug 21, 2012	Nov 29, 2012	Aug 16, 2012		XBO	
Darkstalkers Resurrection (Night Warriors: Darkstalkers' Revenge and Vampire Savior)	Fighting	Iron Galaxy	Capcom	Mar 13, 2013	Unreleased	Unreleased	Unreleased	XBLA		
DarkStar One: Broken Alliance	Space Combat Sim	Gaming Minds Studio	Kalypso Media	Jul 20, 2010	Jun 18, 2010	Unreleased	Aug 19, 2010			
Darwinia+	Action & adventure	Introversion Software	Microsoft Game Studios	Feb 10, 2010	Unreleased	Unreleased	Unreleased	XBLA		
Dash of Destruction	Racing & flying	NinjaBee	NinjaBee	Dec 17, 2008	Unreleased	Unreleased	Unreleased	XBLA		
Days of Thunder: Arcade	Racing & flying	Piranha Games	Paramount Digital Entertainment	Feb 25, 2011	Unreleased	Unreleased	Unreleased	XBLA		
Daytona USA	Racing & flying	Sega	Sega	Oct 26, 2011	Unreleased	Unreleased	Unreleased	XBLA	XBO	
de Blob 2	Puzzle, Platform	Blue Tongue Entertainment	THQ	Feb 22, 2011	Feb 25, 2011	Unreleased	Feb 24, 2011	3D	XBO	
Dead Block	Action & adventure	Candygun Games	Bandai Namco Entertainment	Jul 6, 2011	Unreleased	Unreleased	Unreleased	XBLA		
Dead Island	First-person shooter; survival horror; open world	Techland	Deep Silver	Sep 6, 2011	Sep 9, 2011	Unreleased	Sep 9, 2011			
Dead Island: Riptide	First-person shooter; survival horror; open world	Techland	Deep Silver	Apr 23, 2013	Apr 26, 2013	Unreleased	Apr 23, 2013			
Dead or Alive 4	Fighting	Team Ninja	Tecmo	Dec 29, 2005	Jan 27, 2006	Dec 29, 2005	Mar 23, 2006		XBO	
Dead or Alive 5	Fighting	Team Ninja	Tecmo Koei	Sep 25, 2012	Sep 28, 2012	Sep 27, 2012	Sep 27, 2012			
Dead or Alive 5 Last Round	Fighting, update	Team Ninja	Tecmo Koei	Feb 17, 2015	Feb 20, 2015	Feb 19, 2015	Feb 19, 2015			
Dead or Alive 5 Ultimate	Fighting, update	Team Ninja	Tecmo Koei	Sep 3, 2013	Sep 6, 2013	Sep 5, 2013	Sep 26, 2013			
Dead or Alive Xtreme 2	Sports	Team Ninja	Tecmo	Nov 13, 2006	Dec 8, 2006	Nov 22, 2006	Dec 7, 2006			
Dead Rising	Action-adventure; survival horror; open world	Capcom	Capcom	Aug 8, 2006	Sep 8, 2006	Sep 28, 2006	Sep 14, 2006			
Dead Rising 2	Action-adventure; survival horror	Blue Castle Games; Capcom	Capcom	Sep 28, 2010	Sep 24, 2010	Sep 30, 2010	Sep 23, 2010			
Dead Rising 2: Case West	Action-adventure	Blue Castle Games	Capcom	Dec 27, 2010	Unreleased	Unreleased	Unreleased	XBLA	XBO	
Dead Rising 2: Case Zero	Action-adventure	Blue Castle Games	Capcom	Aug 31, 2010	Unreleased	Unreleased	Unreleased	XBLA	XBO	
Dead Rising 2: Off the Record	Action-adventure; survival horror	Capcom Vancouver	Capcom	Oct 11, 2011	Oct 14, 2011	Oct 13, 2011	Oct 13, 2011			
Dead Space	Third-person shooter; survival horror	EA Redwood Shores	Electronic Arts	Oct 14, 2008	Oct 24, 2008	Unreleased	Oct 23, 2008		XBO	
Dead Space 2	Third-person shooter; survival horror	Visceral Games	Electronic Arts	Jan 25, 2011	Jan 28, 2011	Unreleased	Jan 27, 2011		XBO	
Dead Space 3	Third-person shooter; survival horror	Visceral Games	Electronic Arts	Feb 5, 2013	Feb 8, 2013	Unreleased	Feb 7, 2013	K	XBO	
Dead Space Ignition	Action & adventure	Sumo Digital	Electronic Arts	Oct 13, 2010	Unreleased	Unreleased	Unreleased	XBLA	XBO	
Dead to Rights: Retribution	Action	Volatile Games	Namco Bandai Games	Apr 27, 2010	Apr 23, 2010	Jul 8, 2010	Apr 22, 2010		XBO	
Deadfall Adventures	First-person shooter, action-adventure	The Farm 51	Nordic Games	Nov 15, 2013	Nov 15, 2013	Unreleased	Nov 15, 2013		XBO	
Deadliest Catch: Alaskan Storm	Sim, God game	Liquid Dragon Studios	Greenwave Games	Jun 16, 2008	Unreleased	Unreleased	Unreleased			
Deadliest Catch: Sea of Chaos	Sim, God game	DoubleTap Games	Crave Entertainment	Nov 29, 2010	Unreleased	Unreleased	Unreleased			
Deadliest Warrior: Ancient Combat	Fighting game	Pipeworks Software	345 Games	Apr 17, 2012	Unreleased	Unreleased	Unreleased		XBO	
Deadliest Warrior: Battlegrounds	Action & adventure	Hardsuit Labs	Spike Games	Jul 22, 2015	Unreleased	Unreleased	Unreleased	XBLA		
Deadliest Warrior: Legends	Fighting	Pipeworks Software	345 Games/Spike Games	Jul 6, 2011	Unreleased	Unreleased	Unreleased	XBLA	XBO	
Deadliest Warrior: The Game	Fighting	Pipeworks Software	Spike Games	Jul 14, 2010	Unreleased	Unreleased	Unreleased	XBLA		
Deadlight	Action & adventure	Tequila Works	Microsoft Studios	Aug 1, 2012	Unreleased	Unreleased	Unreleased	XBLA		
Deadly Premonition (Note: Known as Red Seeds Profile in Japan.)	Survival Horror, open world	Access Games	UTV Ignition Entertainment	Feb 23, 2010	Oct 29, 2010	Mar 11, 2010	Unreleased		XBO	
Deadpool	Third-person shooter, Fighting	High Moon Studios	Activision	Jun 25, 2013	Jun 28, 2013	Unreleased	Jun 26, 2013			
Death By Cube	Action & adventure	Premium Agency	Square Enix	Jan 20, 2010	Unreleased	Unreleased	Unreleased	XBLA		
Death Tank	Shooter	Snowblind Studios	Microsoft Game Studios	Feb 18, 2009	Unreleased	Unreleased	Unreleased	XBLA		
Deathsmiles	Bullet hell	Cave	Aksys Games^{NA}, Cave^{JP}	Jun 29, 2010	Feb 18, 2011	Apr 23, 2009	Mar 10, 2011			
Deathsmiles II	Bullet hell	Cave	Cave	Unreleased	Unreleased	May 27, 2010	Unreleased			
DeathSpank	Role-playing	Hothead Games	Electronic Arts	Jul 14, 2010	Unreleased	Unreleased	Unreleased	XBLA		
Deathspank: The Baconing	Role-playing	Hothead Games	Valcon Games	Aug 31, 2011	Unreleased	Unreleased	Unreleased	XBLA		
DeathSpank: Thongs of Virtue	Role-playing	Hothead Games	Electronic Arts	Sep 22, 2010	Unreleased	Unreleased	Unreleased	XBLA	XBO	
Deca Sports Freedom. Sports Island freedom in PAL Region	Sports	Hudson Soft	Konami	Nov 18, 2010	Nov 26, 2010	Dec 2, 2010	Dec 16, 2010	K		
Deep Black: Episode 1	Action & adventure	Biart	505 Games	Apr 25, 2012	Unreleased	Unreleased	Unreleased	XBLA		
Deepak Chopra's Leela	Fitness	THQ	THQ	Jun 5, 2012	Jun 5, 2012	Unreleased	Unreleased	K		
Def Jam: Icon	Fighting	EA Chicago	Electronic Arts	Mar 6, 2007	Mar 23, 2007	Jun 21, 2007	Mar 15, 2007			
Def Jam Rapstar	Music, simulation	4mm Games	Konami	Oct 5, 2010	Nov 5, 2010	Unreleased	Feb 11, 2011	K		
Defender	Classics	Midway Games/ Digital Eclipse	Midway Games	Nov 15, 2006	Unreleased	Unreleased	Unreleased	XBLA		
Defenders of Ardania	Strategy & simulation	Most Wanted Entertainment	Deep Silver/ Paradox Interactive	Mar 14, 2012	Unreleased	Unreleased	Unreleased	XBLA		
Defense Grid: The Awakening	Strategy & simulation	Hidden Path Entertainment	Microsoft Game Studios	Sep 2, 2009	Unreleased	Unreleased	Unreleased	XBLA	XBO	
Defense Technica	Strategy & simulation	Kuno Interactive	Cyberfront Korea Corporation	Apr 23, 2014	Unreleased	Unreleased	Unreleased	XBLA		
Defiance	Third-person shooter; role-playing	Trion Worlds	Trion Worlds	Apr 2, 2013	Apr 2, 2013	Unreleased	Apr 11, 2013	K		
Destiny	Action role-playing; first-person shooter	Bungie	Activision	Sep 9, 2014	Sep 9, 2014	Unreleased	Sep 9, 2014			
Destroy All Humans! Path of the Furon	Third-person shooter; adventure	Sandblast Games	THQ	Dec 1, 2008	Feb 13, 2009	Unreleased	Feb 12, 2009			
Deus Ex: Human Revolution	Action role-playing, stealth	Eidos Montréal	Square Enix	Aug 23, 2011	Aug 26, 2011	Oct 20, 2011	Oct 25, 2011		XBO	
Deus Ex: Human Revolution Director's Cut	Action role-playing, stealth, update	Eidos Montréal	Square Enix	Oct 22, 2013	Oct 25, 2013	Unreleased	Oct 24, 2013			
Devil May Cry 4	Hack & slash; action	Capcom	Capcom	Feb 5, 2008	Feb 8, 2008	Jan 31, 2008	Feb 7, 2008			
Devil May Cry HD Collection (Note: This collection features High-Definition re-masters of the first 3 Devil May Cry titles originally released on the PS2.)	Hack & Slash, action	Capcom	Capcom	Apr 3, 2012	Apr 3, 2012	Mar 22, 2012	Apr 5, 2012			
Diablo III	Action Role-playing	Blizzard Entertainment	Blizzard Entertainment	Sep 3, 2013	Sep 3, 2013	Unreleased	Sep 3, 2013			
Diablo III: Reaper of Souls	Action Role-playing	Blizzard Entertainment	Blizzard Entertainment	Aug 19, 2014	Aug 19, 2014	Unreleased	Aug 19, 2014			
Diabolical Pitch	Kinect	Grasshopper Manufacture	Microsoft Studios	Apr 4, 2012	Unreleased	Unreleased	Unreleased	K XBLA		
Diario: Rebirth Moon Legend	Role-playing	Idea Factory	Idea Factory	Unreleased	Unreleased	Feb 8, 2007	Unreleased			
Dig Dug	Classics	Bandai Namco Entertainment	Bandai Namco Entertainment	Oct 11, 2006	Unreleased	Unreleased	Unreleased	XBLA	XBO	
Digimon All-Star Rumble	Fighting	Bandai Namco Games	Bandai Namco Games	Nov 11, 2014	Nov 11, 2014	Unreleased	Unreleased			
Diner Dash	Puzzle & trivia	GameLab	Hudson Soft	Nov 18, 2009	Unreleased	Unreleased	Unreleased	XBLA		
Dirt	Racing	Codemasters	Codemasters	Jun 19, 2007	Jun 15, 2007	Unreleased	Jun 29, 2007			
Dirt 2	Racing	Codemasters	Codemasters	Sep 8, 2009	Sep 11, 2009	Unreleased	Sep 17, 2009			
Dirt 3	Racing	Codemasters	Codemasters	May 24, 2011	May 24, 2011	Unreleased	May 26, 2011		XBO	
Dirt: Showdown	Racing	Codemasters	Codemasters	Jun 12, 2012	May 25, 2012	Unreleased	Unreleased		XBO	
Discs of Tron	Classics	Midway Games; Digital Eclipse	Disney Interactive Studios	Feb 13, 2008	Unreleased	Unreleased	Unreleased	XBLA	XBO	
Dishonored (Note: On October 8, 2013, Bethesda published the Dishonored: Game of the Year Edition which contains the full game plus the Void-Walker's Arsenal, Dunwall City Trials, The Knife of Dunwall and The Brigmore Witches DLC packs.)	Action	Arkane Studios	Bethesda Softworks	Oct 9, 2012	Oct 12, 2012	Oct 11, 2012	Oct 11, 2012			
The Dishwasher: Dead Samurai	Action & adventure	Ska Studios	Microsoft Game Studios	Apr 1, 2009	Unreleased	Unreleased	Unreleased	XBLA		
The Dishwasher: Vampire Smile	Action & adventure	Ska Studios	Microsoft Game Studios	Apr 6, 2011	Unreleased	Unreleased	Unreleased	XBLA		
Disney Infinity	Action-adventure	Avalanche Software	Disney Interactive Studios	Aug 18, 2013	Aug 20, 2013	Unreleased	Aug 19, 2013			
Disney Infinity 2.0	Action-adventure	Avalanche Software	Disney Interactive Studios	Sep 23, 2014	Sep 19, 2014	Unreleased	Sep 18, 2014			
Disney Infinity 3.0	Action-adventure	Avalanche Software	Disney Interactive Studios	Aug 30, 2015	Aug 28, 2014	Unreleased	Sep 3, 2015			
Disney Sing It	Music	Zoë Mode	Disney Interactive Studios	Oct 21, 2008	Nov 7, 2008	Unreleased	Nov 6, 2008			
Disney Sing It! – High School Musical 3: Senior Year	Music	Zoë Mode	Disney Interactive Studios	Feb 17, 2009	Dec 5, 2008	Unreleased	Dec 4, 2008			
Disney Universe	Fantasy	Eurocom	Disney Interactive Studios	Oct 25, 2011	Oct 28, 2011	Unreleased	Oct 27, 2011			
Disorder 6	Visual novel	5pb. Games	5pb. Games	Unreleased	Unreleased	Aug 22, 2013	Unreleased			
Divinity II: Ego Draconis	Action role-playing	Larian Studios	CDV Software Entertainment	Jan 5, 2010	Nov 20, 2009	Unreleased	Nov 19, 2009			
Divinity II: The Dragon Knight Saga	Action role-playing, update	Larian Studios	Atlus	Apr 12, 2011	Nov 19, 2010	Dec 22, 2011	Nov 19, 2010		XBO	
DJ Hero	Music	FreeStyleGames	Activision	Oct 27, 2009	Oct 29, 2009	Unreleased	Oct 28, 2009			
DJ Hero 2	Music	FreeStyleGames	Activision	Oct 19, 2010	Oct 22, 2010	Unreleased	Oct 19, 2010			
DmC: Devil May Cry	Hack & Slash, action	Ninja Theory	Capcom	Jan 15, 2013	Jan 15, 2013	Jan 17, 2013	Jan 15, 2013			
DoDonPachi Dai Ou Jou Black Label Extra	Bullet hell	Cave	5pb.	Unreleased	Unreleased	Dec 25, 2008	Unreleased			
Do-Don-Pachi Dai-Fukkatsu (Note: Known as DoDonPachi Resurrection in Europe.)	Bullet hell	Cave	Cave	Unreleased	Nov 4, 2011	Nov 25, 2010	Unreleased			
Do-Don-Pachi Dai-Fukkatsu Black Label	Bullet hell, update	Cave	Cave	Unreleased	Unreleased	Feb 3, 2011	Unreleased			
DoDonPachi SaiDaiOuJou	Bullet hell	Cave	Cave	Unreleased	Unreleased	May 30, 2013	Unreleased			
Dogfight 1942	Racing & flying	CI Games	CI Games	Sep 5, 2012	Unreleased	Unreleased	Unreleased	XBLA		
Dollar Dash	Action & adventure	Candygun Games	Kalypso Media	Mar 6, 2013	Unreleased	Unreleased	Unreleased	XBLA		
Domino Master	Card & board	TikGames	Microsoft Game Studios	Sep 17, 2008	Unreleased	Unreleased	Unreleased	XBLA	XBO	
Don Bradman Cricket 14	Sports	Big Ant Studios	Tru Blu Entertainment	Unreleased	Apr 11, 2014	Unreleased	Apr 3, 2014			
Don King Presents: Prizefighter	Sports	Venom Games	2K Sports	Jun 10, 2008	Jun 13, 2008	Unreleased	Jul 3, 2008			
Doodle Jump for Kinect	Kinect	Lima Sky	D3 Publisher	Jun 28, 2013	Unreleased	Unreleased	Unreleased	K XBLA		
Doom	Shooter	id Software	Bethesda Softworks	Sep 27, 2006	Unreleased	Unreleased	Unreleased	XBLA	XBO	
Doom 3 BFG Edition	First-person shooter	id Software	Bethesda Softworks	Oct 16, 2012	Oct 19, 2012	Nov 22, 2012	Oct 18, 2012	3D	XBO	
Doom II: Hell on Earth	Shooter	id Software	Bethesda Softworks	May 26, 2010	Unreleased	Unreleased	Unreleased	XBLA	XBO	
Doritos Crash Course	Platformer	Wanako Games	Microsoft Game Studios	Dec 8, 2010	Unreleased	Unreleased	Unreleased	XBLA	XBO	
Doritos Crash Course 2	Platformer	BHVR	Microsoft Studios	May 8, 2013	Unreleased	Unreleased	Unreleased	XBLA		
Double D Dodgeball	Sports & recreation	Yuke's	Yuke's	Jul 16, 2008	Unreleased	Unreleased	Unreleased	XBLA		
Double Dragon	Classics	Razerworks	Empire Interactive	May 9, 2007	Unreleased	Unreleased	Unreleased	XBLA		
Double Dragon II: Wander of the Dragons	Action & adventure	Gravity Interactive	Barunson	Apr 5, 2013	Unreleased	Unreleased	Unreleased	XBLA		
Double Dragon Neon	Action & adventure	WayForward Technologies	Majesco	Sep 12, 2012	Unreleased	Unreleased	Unreleased	XBLA	XBO	
Double Fine Happy Action Theater	Kinect	Double Fine Productions	Microsoft Studios	Feb 1, 2012	Unreleased	Unreleased	Unreleased	K XBLA		
Dragon Age: Inquisition	Action Role-playing	BioWare	Electronic Arts	Nov 18, 2014	Nov 21, 2014	Unreleased	Nov 20, 2014			
Dragon Age: Origins	Role-playing	BioWare	Electronic Arts	Nov 3, 2009	Nov 6, 2009	Unreleased	Nov 5, 2009		XBO	
Dragon Age: Origins – Awakening	Role-playing, stand-alone expansion	BioWare	Electronic Arts	Mar 16, 2010	Mar 18, 2010	Unreleased	Mar 17, 2010			
Dragon Age II	Action Role-playing	BioWare	Electronic Arts	Mar 8, 2011	Mar 11, 2011	Unreleased	Mar 10, 2011		XBO	
Dragon Ball: Raging Blast	Fighting	Spike	Namco Bandai Games	Nov 10, 2009	Nov 13, 2009	Nov 12, 2009	Nov 19, 2009			
Dragon Ball: Raging Blast 2	Fighting	Spike	Namco Bandai Games	Nov 2, 2010	Oct 24, 2010	Nov 11, 2010	Nov 4, 2010			
Dragon Ball Xenoverse	Fighting-Action	Dimps	Namco Bandai Games	Feb 24, 2015	Feb 27, 2015	Feb 5, 2015	Feb 26, 2015			
Dragon Ball Z: Battle of Z	Fighting	Artdink	Namco Bandai Games	Jan 28, 2014	Jan 24, 2014	Jan 23, 2014	Unreleased			
Dragon Ball Z: Budokai HD Collection	Fighting	Spike	Namco Bandai Games	Nov 2, 2010	Oct 24, 2010	Nov 11, 2010	Nov 22, 2013			
Dragon Ball Z: Burst Limit	Fighting	Dimps	Namco Bandai Games^{JP/EU}, Atari^{NA/AU}	Jun 10, 2008	Jun 6, 2008	Jun 5, 2008	Jul 3, 2008			
Dragon Ball Z: Ultimate Tenkaichi	Fighting	Spike	Namco Bandai Games	Oct 25, 2011	Oct 28, 2011	Dec 8, 2011	Nov 22, 2013			
Dragon Ball Z for Kinect	Fighting	Spike Chunsoft	Namco Bandai Games	Oct 9, 2012	Oct 2, 2012	Unreleased	Unreleased	K		
Dragon's Dogma	Action Role-playing, open world	Capcom	Capcom	May 25, 2012	May 24, 2012	May 24, 2012	Nov 22, 2013			
Dragon's Dogma: Dark Arisen	Action Role-playing, open world, update	Capcom	Capcom	Apr 23, 2013	Apr 23, 2013	Apr 23, 2013	Nov 22, 2013			
Dragon's Lair	Classics	Digital Leisure	Microsoft Studios	May 18, 2012	Unreleased	Unreleased	Unreleased	K XBLA	XBO	
Dream Chronicles	Puzzle & trivia	KatGames	PlayFirst	Oct 20, 2010	Unreleased	Unreleased	Unreleased	XBLA		
Dream Club	Dating sim	Tamsoft	D3 Publisher	Unreleased	Unreleased	Aug 27, 2009	Unreleased			
Dream Club Zero	Dating sim	Tamsoft	D3 Publisher	Unreleased	Unreleased	Jan 27, 2011	Unreleased			
Dreamcast Collection	Compilation	Sega	Sega	Feb 22, 2011	Feb 25, 2011	Unreleased	Feb 24, 2011			
DreamWorks Super Star Kartz	Racing	High Impact Games	Activision	Nov 15, 2011	Nov 18, 2011	Unreleased	Unreleased			
Driver: San Francisco	Racing Mission, open world	Ubisoft Reflections	Ubisoft	Sep 6, 2011	Sep 2, 2011	Nov 10, 2011	Sep 1, 2011		XBO	
Droplitz	Puzzle & trivia	Blitz Arcade	Atlus	Jun 24, 2009	Unreleased	Unreleased	Unreleased	XBLA		
Duck Dynasty	Hunting/fishing	Activision	Activision	Oct 14, 2014	Unreleased	Unreleased	Unreleased			
DuckTales: Remastered	Platformer	WayForward Technologies	Capcom	Sep 11, 2013	Nov 12, 2013	Unreleased	Nov 22, 2013	XBLA	XBO	
Duke Nukem 3D	Shooter	3D Realms	Microsoft Game Studios	Sep 24, 2008	Unreleased	Unreleased	Unreleased	XBLA		
Duke Nukem Forever	First-person shooter	Gearbox Software	2K Games	Jun 14, 2011	Jun 10, 2011	Jun 10, 2011	Nov 22, 2013		XBO	
Duke Nukem: Manhattan Project	Action & adventure	3D Realms	Microsoft Game Studios	Jun 23, 2010	Unreleased	Unreleased	Unreleased	XBLA	XBO	
Dunamis 15	Visual novel	5pb.	5pb.	Unreleased	Unreleased	Sep 15, 2011	Unreleased			
Dungeon Defenders	Strategy & ARole-playing	Trendy Entertainment	D3 Publisher	Oct 19, 2011	Unreleased	Unreleased	Unreleased	XBLA		
Dungeon Fighter Live: Fall of Hendon Myre	Role playing	Nexon	Microsoft Studios	Jul 13, 2012	Unreleased	Unreleased	Unreleased	XBLA		
Dungeon Siege III	Action Role-playing	Obsidian Entertainment	Square Enix	Jun 21, 2011	Jun 17, 2011	Jul 28, 2011	Nov 22, 2013		XBO	
Dungeons & Dragons: Chronicles of Mystara (Shadow Over Mystara and Tower of Doom)	Action & adventure	Iron Galaxy	Capcom	Jun 19, 2013	Unreleased	Unreleased	Unreleased	XBLA	XBO	
Dungeons & Dragons: Daggerdale	Role playing	Bedlam Games	Atari	May 25, 2011	Unreleased	Unreleased	Unreleased	XBLA		
Dust: An Elysian Tail	Platformer	Humble Hearts	Microsoft Studios	Aug 15, 2012	Unreleased	Unreleased	Unreleased	XBLA		
Dustforce	Platformer	Hitbox Team	Capcom	Jan 17, 2012	Unreleased	Unreleased	Unreleased	XBLA		
Dynasty Warriors 5 Empires	Hack & Slash, Tactical Role-playing	Omega Force	Koei	Mar 28, 2006	Jun 23, 2006	Mar 23, 2006	Jun 23, 2006			
Dynasty Warriors 6	Hack & Slash, Tactical Role-playing	Omega Force	Koei	Feb 19, 2008	Mar 7, 2008	Nov 11, 2007	Nov 22, 2013			
Dynasty Warriors 6 Empires	Hack & Slash, Tactical Role-playing	Omega Force	Koei	Jun 16, 2009	Jun 26, 2009	Jan 29, 2009	Nov 22, 2013			
Dynasty Warriors 7	Hack & Slash, Tactical Role-playing	Omega Force	Koei	Mar 25, 2011	Mar 25, 2011	Mar 25, 2011	Nov 22, 2013			
Dynasty Warriors 8	Hack & Slash, Tactical Role-playing	Omega Force	Koei	Jul 16, 2013	Jul 19, 2013	Feb 28, 2013	Nov 22, 2013			
Dynasty Warriors: Gundam (Note: Known as Gundam Musou International in Japan.)	Hack and slash, tactical role-playing	Koei, Omega Force	Namco Bandai, Koei^{EU}	Aug 28, 2007	Nov 9, 2007	Mar 1, 2007	Nov 22, 2013			
Dynasty Warriors: Gundam 2 (Note: Known as Gundam Musou 2 in Japan.)	Hack & Slash, Tactical Role-playing	Omega Force	Namco Bandai, Koei^{EU}	Apr 21, 2009	Apr 24, 2009	Dec 18, 2008	Nov 22, 2013			
Dynasty Warriors: Gundam 3 (Note: Known as Gundam Musou 3 in Japan.)	Hack & Slash, Tactical Role-playing	Koei, Omega Force	Namco Bandai, Koei^{EU}	Jun 28, 2011	Jul 1, 2011	Dec 16, 2010	Nov 22, 2013			
Dynasty Warriors: Strikeforce (Note: Known as Shin Sangoku Musou MultiRaid Special in Japan.)	Hack & Slash, Tactical Role-playing	Koei	Koei	Feb 16, 2010	Feb 19, 2010	Oct 1, 2009	Nov 22, 2013			
EA Sports Active 2		EA Vancouver	EA Sports	Nov 16, 2010	Nov 19, 2010	Nov 18, 2010	Unreleased	K		
EA Sports Fantasy Football: Live Draft Tracker	Application, Sports & recreation	EA Tiburon	EA Sports	Jul 16, 2008	Unreleased	Unreleased	Unreleased	XBLA		
EA Sports Fantasy Football: Live Score Tracker	Application, Sports & recreation	EA Tiburon	EA Sports	Sep 3, 2008	Unreleased	Unreleased	Unreleased	XBLA		
EA Sports MMA	Sports	EA Tiburon	EA Sports	Oct 19, 2010	Oct 19, 2010	Oct 19, 2010	Nov 22, 2013			
Earth Defense Force 2017	Third-person shooter	Sandlot	D3 Publisher	Mar 20, 2007	Mar 20, 2007	Dec 14, 2006	Nov 22, 2013		XBO	
Earth Defense Force 2025	Third-person shooter	Sandlot	D3 Publisher^{JP/NA}, Namco Bandai Games^{EU/AU}	Feb 18, 2014	Feb 21, 2014	Jul 4, 2013	Nov 22, 2013		XBO	
Earth Defense Force: Insect Armageddon	Third-person shooter	Vicious Cycle Software	D3 Publisher^{JP/NA}, Namco Bandai Games^{EU/AU}	Jul 5, 2011	Jul 22, 2011	Jul 7, 2011	Nov 22, 2013		XBO	
Earthworm Jim HD	Classics	Gameloft	Microsoft Game Studios	Jun 9, 2010	Unreleased	Unreleased	Unreleased	XBLA	XBO	
Eat Lead: The Return of Matt Hazard	Third-person shooter	Vicious Cycle Software	D3 Publisher	Feb 26, 2009	Mar 6, 2009	Feb 18, 2009	Nov 22, 2013		XBO	
Ecco the Dolphin	Classics	Novotrade International; Digital Eclipse	Sega	Aug 15, 2007	Unreleased	Unreleased	Unreleased	XBLA		
Eets: Chowdown	Puzzle & trivia	Klei Entertainment	Microsoft Game Studios	Apr 25, 2007	Unreleased	Unreleased	Unreleased	XBLA		
El Chavo Kart	Racing	Effecto Studios (along with Slang)	Televisa Home Entertainment	Feb 21, 2014	Unreleased	Unreleased	Unreleased			
The Elder Scrolls IV: Oblivion (Note: The Elder Scrolls IV: Knights of the Nine, Oblivion's first expansion pack, was released on November 21, 2006 as downloadable content.) (Note: The Elder Scrolls IV: Oblivion Game of the Year Edition was released on September 10, 2007 in North America and September 21, 2007 in Europe. It combined The Elder Scrolls IV: Oblivion, The Elder Scrolls IV: Knights of the Nine, and The Elder Scrolls IV: Shivering Isles into one game.)	Action RPG, open world	Bethesda Game Studios	2K Games	Mar 20, 2006	Mar 24, 2006	Jul 26, 2007	Mar 23, 2006		XBO XE	
The Elder Scrolls IV: Shivering Isles (Note: Originally released as downloadable content on March 26, 2007, but was then re-released in retail form on October 16, 2007.)	Action RPG, open world, DLC	Bethesda Game Studios	Bethesda Softworks	Oct 16, 2007	Nov 23, 2007	Unreleased	Nov 23, 2007			
The Elder Scrolls V: Skyrim	Action RPG, open world	Bethesda Game Studios	Bethesda Softworks	Nov 11, 2011	Nov 11, 2011	Dec 8, 2011	Nov 11, 2011	K		
El Shaddai: Ascension of the Metatron	Action	Ignition Tokyo	UTV Ignition Games	Aug 16, 2011	Sep 8, 2011	Apr 28, 2011	Sep 15, 2011			
Elements of Destruction	Strategy & simulation	Frozen Codebase	THQ	Jun 18, 2008	Unreleased	Unreleased	Unreleased	XBLA		
Enchanted Arms (Note: Known as [eM] -eNCHANT arM- in Japan.)	Role-playing	From Software	Ubisoft	Aug 29, 2006	Sep 8, 2006	Jan 12, 2006	Sep 7, 2006		XBO	
Encleverment Experiment	Family & educational	Blitz Arcade	Microsoft Game Studios	Nov 11, 2009	Unreleased	Unreleased	Unreleased	XBLA	XBO	
Enemy Front	First-person shooter	City Interactive	City Interactive	Jun 10, 2014	Jun 13, 2014	Jun 13, 2014	Nov 22, 2013			
Enemy Territory: Quake Wars	First-person shooter	id Software, Nerve Software	Activision	May 27, 2008	May 30, 2008	Unreleased	Nov 22, 2013			
Enslaved: Odyssey to the West	Action-adventure, Platform	Ninja Theory	Namco Bandai Games	Oct 5, 2010	Oct 8, 2010	Oct 7, 2010	Oct 7, 2010		XBO	
Entaku no Seito: Students of Round	Action role-playing	Experience Inc.	ChunSoft	Unreleased	Unreleased	Feb 10, 2011	Unreleased			
Epic Mickey 2: The Power of Two	Action-adventure, Platform	Blitz Games	Disney Interactive Studios	Nov 18, 2012	Nov 23, 2012	Unreleased	Nov 22, 2013	3D	XBO	
Eragon	Hack & Slash, action-adventure	Stormfront Studios	Vivendi Games	Nov 14, 2006	Nov 24, 2006	Unreleased	Nov 23, 2006			
Escape Dead Island	Action, survival horror, Stealth	Fatshark	Deep Silver	Nov 18, 2014	Nov 21, 2014	Nov 28, 2014	Nov 22, 2013		XBO	
The Escapists	Strategy & simulation	Mouldy Toof Studios/Team17	Team17	Dec 18, 2015	Unreleased	Unreleased	Unreleased	XBLA		
Eschatos	Scrolling shooter	Qute	Qute	Unreleased	Unreleased	Feb 28, 2012	Unreleased			
Espgaluda II	Bullet hell	Cave	Cave	Unreleased	Unreleased	Feb 25, 2010	Nov 22, 2013			
Eternal Sonata	Role-playing	Tri-Crescendo	Namco Bandai Games	Sep 17, 2007	Oct 19, 2007	Jun 14, 2007	Nov 22, 2013			
Ever17	Visual novel	5pb.	5pb.	Unreleased	Unreleased	Dec 1, 2011	Unreleased			
Every Extend Extra Extreme (E4)	Action & adventure	Q Entertainment	Microsoft Game Studios	Oct 17, 2007	Unreleased	Unreleased	Unreleased	XBLA	XBO	
Everyone Sing	Party game, Singing Game	O-Games	O-Games	Sep 4, 2012	Sep 4, 2012	Unreleased	Sep 4, 2012			
Every Party	Party game	Game Republic	Microsoft Game Studios	Unreleased	Unreleased	Dec 10, 2005	Unreleased			
The Evil Within	Survival horror, third-person shooter	Tango Gameworks	Bethesda Softworks	Oct 14, 2014	Oct 14, 2014	Oct 23, 2014	Nov 22, 2013			
Exit	Puzzle & trivia	Taito	Taito	Oct 24, 2007	Unreleased	Unreleased	Unreleased	XBLA		
Exit 2	Puzzle & trivia	Taito	Taito	Feb 25, 2009	Unreleased	Unreleased	Unreleased	XBLA		
The Expendables 2 Video Game	Shooter	ZootFly	Ubisoft	Aug 17, 2012	Unreleased	Unreleased	Unreleased	XBLA		
F.E.A.R.	First-person shooter, survival horror	Day 1 Studios	Vivendi Games	Oct 31, 2006	Nov 10, 2006	Unreleased	Oct 31, 2006			
F.E.A.R. 2: Project Origin	First-person shooter, survival horror	Monolith Productions	Warner Bros. Interactive Entertainment	Feb 10, 2009	Feb 13, 2009	Unreleased	Nov 22, 2013			
F.E.A.R. 3	First-person shooter, survival horror	Day 1 Studios	Warner Bros. Interactive Entertainment	Jun 21, 2011	Jun 24, 2011	Jul 21, 2011	Nov 22, 2013			
F.E.A.R. Files (Note: F.E.A.R. Extraction Point and F.E.A.R. Perseus Mandate combined into one game.)	First-person shooter, survival horror, stand-alone expansion	TimeGate Studios	Sierra Entertainment	Nov 6, 2007	Nov 16, 2007	Unreleased	Nov 22, 2013			
F1 2010	Racing	Codemasters Birmingham	Codemasters	Sep 22, 2010	Sep 23, 2010	Unreleased	Sep 22, 2010			
F1 2011	Racing	Codemasters Birmingham	Codemasters	Sep 20, 2011	Sep 23, 2011	Unreleased	Sep 22, 2011			
F1 2012	Racing	Codemasters Birmingham	Codemasters	Sep 18, 2012	Sep 21, 2012	Unreleased	Sep 20, 2012			
F1 2013	Racing	Codemasters Birmingham	Codemasters	Oct 8, 2013	Oct 4, 2013	Unreleased	Oct 7, 2013			
F1 2014	Racing	Codemasters Birmingham	Codemasters	Oct 21, 2014	Oct 17, 2014	Unreleased	Oct 16, 2014		XBO	
F1 Race Stars	Racing	Codemasters Birmingham	Codemasters	Nov 13, 2012	Nov 16, 2012	Unreleased	Nov 15, 2012			
Fable Anniversary	Action Role-playing, open world	Lionhead Studios	Microsoft Studios	Feb 4, 2014	Feb 7, 2014	Feb 6, 2014	Feb 6, 2014		XBO XE	
Fable Heroes	Action & adventure	Lionhead Studios	Microsoft Game Studios	May 2, 2012	Unreleased	Unreleased	Unreleased	XBLA	XBO	
Fable II	Action Role-playing, open world	Lionhead Studios	Microsoft Game Studios	Oct 21, 2008	Oct 24, 2008	Dec 18, 2008	Oct 23, 2008		XBO XE	
Fable II Pub Games	Card & board	Carbonated Games/Lionhead Studios	Microsoft Game Studios	Aug 13, 2008	Unreleased	Unreleased	Unreleased	XBLA	XBO	
Fable III	Action Role-playing, open world	Lionhead Studios	Microsoft Game Studios	Oct 26, 2010	Oct 29, 2010	Oct 28, 2010	Oct 26, 2010		XBO XE	
Fable: The Journey		Lionhead Studios	Microsoft Studios	Oct 9, 2012	Oct 12, 2012	Oct 11, 2012	Oct 9, 2012	K		
FaceBreaker	Sports	EA Canada	EA Sports Freestyle	Sep 3, 2008	Sep 5, 2008	Oct 16, 2008	Nov 22, 2013			
Faery: Legends of Avalon	Role playing	Spiders	Focus Home Interactive	Nov 10, 2010	Unreleased	Unreleased	Unreleased	XBLA	XBO	
Fairytale Fights	Hack & Slash, action-adventure	Playlogic	Playlogic	Oct 27, 2009	Oct 23, 2009	Unreleased	Nov 22, 2013			
Falling Skies: The Game	Strategy	Torus Games	Little Orbit	Sep 23, 2014	Sep 23, 2014	Unreleased	Nov 22, 2013			
Fallout 3	Action Role-playing, open world	Bethesda Game Studios	Bethesda Softworks	Oct 28, 2008	Oct 31, 2008	Dec 4, 2008	Nov 22, 2013		XBO XE	
Fallout 3 Game Add-On Pack - Broken Steel and Point Lookout	Action Role-playing, open world, DLC	Bethesda Game Studios	Bethesda Softworks	Aug 27, 2009	Nov 22, 2013	Nov 22, 2013	Nov 22, 2013			
Fallout 3 Game Add-On Pack - The Pitt and Operation Anchorage	Action Role-playing, open world, DLC	Bethesda Game Studios	Bethesda Softworks	Jul 16, 2009	Nov 22, 2013	Nov 22, 2013	Nov 22, 2013			
Fallout: New Vegas	Action Role-playing	Obsidian Entertainment	Bethesda Softworks	Oct 19, 2010	Oct 19, 2010	Oct 22, 2010	Oct 21, 2010		XBO	
Family Feud 2012	Trivia	Pipeworks Software	THQ	Oct 18, 2012	Oct 18, 2012	Unreleased	Unreleased			
Family Guy: Back to the Multiverse	Action-adventure	Heavy Iron Studios	Activision	Nov 20, 2012	Nov 23, 2012	Nov 21, 2012	Unreleased			
The Fancy Pants Adventures	Platformer	Borne Games/ Over the Top Games	Electronic Arts	Apr 20, 2011	Unreleased	Unreleased	Unreleased	XBLA		
Fantasia: Music Evolved		Harmonix Music Systems	Disney Interactive Studios	Oct 21, 2014	Oct 24, 2014	Oct 23, 2014	Unreleased	K		
Fantastic Four: Rise of the Silver Surfer	Action-adventure, Third-person	Visual Concepts	2K Games	Jun 15, 2007	Jun 15, 2007	Unreleased	Nov 22, 2013			
Fantastic Pets		Blitz Games Studios	THQ	Apr 12, 2011	Apr 15, 2011	Apr 14, 2011	Unreleased	K		
Far Cry 2	First-person shooter, open world	Ubisoft Montreal	Ubisoft	Oct 21, 2008	Oct 24, 2008	Nov 27, 2008	Oct 23, 2008		XBO	
Far Cry 3	First-person shooter, Open world	Ubisoft Montreal	Ubisoft	Dec 4, 2012	Nov 30, 2012	Mar 7, 2013	Nov 29, 2012		XBO	
Far Cry 3: Blood Dragon	Shooter	Ubisoft Montreal	Ubisoft	May 1, 2013	Unreleased	Unreleased	Unreleased	XBLA	XBO	
Far Cry 4	First-person shooter, Open world	Ubisoft Montreal	Ubisoft	Nov 18, 2014	Nov 20, 2014	Unreleased	Nov 18, 2014			
Far Cry Classic	Shooter	Crytek	Ubisoft	Feb 11, 2014	Feb 12, 2014	Unreleased	Feb 12, 2014	XBLA	XBO	
Far Cry Instincts Predator	First-person shooter	Ubisoft Montreal	Ubisoft	Mar 28, 2006	Mar 31, 2006	Unreleased	Mar 30, 2006		XBO	
Farming Simulator	Simulation	Giants Software	Focus Home Interactive	Sep 6, 2013	Sep 6, 2013	Sep 6, 2013	Nov 22, 2013		XBO	
Farming Simulator 15	Simulation	Giants Software	Focus Home Interactive	May 19, 2015	May 19, 2015	Unreleased	Nov 22, 2013			
Fast & Furious: Showdown	Racing	Firebrand Games	Activision	May 21, 2013	May 24, 2013	May 22, 2013	May 22, 2013			
Fatal Fury Special	Classics	SNK	SNK	Sep 5, 2007	Unreleased	Unreleased	Unreleased	XBLA		
Fatal Inertia	Racing	Stormfront Studios	Vivendi Games	Sep 11, 2007	Sep 14, 2007	Sep 6, 2007	Sep 20, 2007			
Feeding Frenzy	Action & adventure	PopCap Games	Microsoft Game Studios	Mar 15, 2006	Unreleased	Unreleased	Unreleased	XBLA	XBO	
Feeding Frenzy 2: Shipwreck Showdown	Action & adventure	PopCap Games	PopCap Games	Sep 17, 2008	Unreleased	Unreleased	Unreleased	XBLA	XBO	
Fez	Action & adventure	Polytron Corporation	Microsoft Studios	Apr 13, 2012	Unreleased	Unreleased	Unreleased	XBLA		
FIFA 06: Road to FIFA World Cup	Sports	EA Canada	EA Sports	Nov 22, 2005	Dec 2, 2005	Dec 10, 2005	Unreleased			
FIFA 07	Sports	EA Canada	EA Sports	Dec 22, 2006	Jan 11, 2007	Unreleased	Dec 26, 2006			
FIFA 08	Sports	EA Canada	EA Sports	Oct 9, 2007	Sep 28, 2007	Dec 20, 2007	Sep 27, 2007			
FIFA 09	Sports	EA Canada	EA Sports	Oct 14, 2008	Oct 3, 2008	Dec 18, 2008	Oct 2, 2008			
FIFA 10	Sports	EA Canada	EA Sports	Oct 20, 2009	Oct 2, 2009	Oct 22, 2009	Oct 1, 2009			
FIFA 11	Sports	EA Canada	EA Sports	Sep 28, 2010	Oct 1, 2010	Oct 21, 2010	Sep 30, 2010			
FIFA 12	Sports	EA Canada	EA Sports	Sep 27, 2011	Sep 30, 2011	Oct 22, 2011	Sep 29, 2011			
FIFA 13	Sports	EA Canada	EA Sports	Sep 25, 2012	Sep 28, 2012	Oct 18, 2012	Sep 27, 2012	K		
FIFA 14	Sports	EA Canada	EA Sports	Sep 24, 2013	Sep 24, 2013	Oct 17, 2013	Sep 24, 2013	K		
FIFA 15	Sports	EA Canada	EA Sports	Sep 23, 2014	Sep 25, 2014	Oct 9, 2014	Sep 25, 2014	K		
FIFA 16	Sports	EA Canada	EA Sports	Sep 22, 2015	Sep 24, 2015	Oct 8, 2015	Sep 24, 2015	K		
FIFA 17	Sports	EA Canada	EA Sports	Sep 27, 2016	Sep 29, 2016	Sep 29, 2016	Nov 22, 2016			
FIFA 18: Legacy Edition	Sports	EA Canada	EA Sports	Sep 29, 2017	Sep 29, 2017	Sep 29, 2017	Sep 29, 2017			
FIFA 19: Legacy Edition	Sports	EA Canada	EA Sports	Sep 28, 2018	Sep 28, 2018	Sep 28, 2018	Sep 28, 2018			
FIFA Street	Sports	EA Canada	EA Sports	Mar 13, 2012	Mar 16, 2012	Unreleased	Nov 22, 2013			
FIFA Street 3	Sports	EA Canada	EA Sports BIG	Feb 18, 2008	Feb 22, 2008	Jun 5, 2008	Nov 22, 2013			
Fight Night Champion	Sports	EA Canada	EA Sports	Mar 1, 2011	Mar 4, 2011	Unreleased	Nov 22, 2013		XBO	
Fight Night Round 3	Sports	EA Chicago	EA Sports	Feb 20, 2006	Mar 10, 2006	Mar 30, 2006	Mar 23, 2006			
Fight Night Round 4	Sports	EA Canada	EA Sports	Jun 30, 2009	Jun 26, 2009	Unreleased	Nov 22, 2013			
Fighters Uncaged		AMA Studios	Ubisoft	Nov 4, 2010	Nov 10, 2010	Nov 18, 2010	May 26, 2011	K		
Fighting Vipers	Fighting	Sega	Sega	Nov 28, 2012	Unreleased	Unreleased	Unreleased	XBLA	XBO	
Final Exam	Action & adventure	Mighty Rocket Studio	Focus Home Interactive	Nov 8, 2013	Unreleased	Unreleased	Unreleased	XBLA		
Final Fantasy XI: Seekers of Adoulin	MMORole-playing, DLC	Square Enix	Square Enix	Mar 26, 2013	Mar 26, 2013	Mar 26, 2013	Nov 22, 2013			
Final Fantasy XI: Wings of the Goddess	MMORole-playing, DLC	Square Enix	Square Enix	Nov 20, 2007	Nov 23, 2007	Nov 22, 2007	Nov 22, 2013			
Final Fantasy XI (Note: Along with the original game, also includes the first three expansions Final Fantasy XI: Rise of the Zilart, Final Fantasy XI: Chains of Promathia, and Final Fantasy XI: Treasures of Aht Urhgan.)	MMORole-playing	Square Enix	Square Enix	Apr 16, 2006	Apr 21, 2006	Apr 20, 2006	Nov 22, 2013			
Final Fantasy XIII	Role-playing	Square Enix	Square Enix	Mar 9, 2010	Mar 9, 2010	Dec 16, 2010	Nov 22, 2013		XBO XE	
Final Fantasy XIII-2	Role-playing	Square Enix	Square Enix	Jan 31, 2012	Feb 3, 2012	Dec 15, 2011	Nov 22, 2013		XBO XE	
Final Fight: Double Impact (Final Fight, Magic Sword)	Classics	Proper Games	Capcom	Apr 14, 2010	Unreleased	Unreleased	Unreleased	XBLA	XBO	
Fire Pro Wrestling	Fighting	Spike Chunsoft	Microsoft Studios	Sep 21, 2012	Unreleased	Unreleased	Unreleased	XBLA		
Fireburst	Racing & flying	IndiePub	Bigben Interactive	Jun 14, 2013	Unreleased	Unreleased	Unreleased	XBLA		
The First Templar	Action-adventure	Haemimont Games	Kalypso Media	Apr 26, 2011	Apr 26, 2011	Apr 26, 2011	Nov 22, 2013			
Fist of the North Star: Ken's Rage (Note: Known as Hokuto Musō in Japan.)	Beat 'em Up	Omega Force	Koei	Nov 2, 2010	Nov 5, 2010	Mar 25, 2010	Nov 22, 2013			
Fist of the North Star: Ken's Rage 2 (Note: Known as Shin Hokuto Musō in Japan.)	Beat 'em Up	Koei	Tecmo Koei	Feb 5, 2013	Feb 8, 2013	Dec 20, 2012	Nov 22, 2013			
Flashback	Platformer	VectorCell	Ubisoft	Aug 21, 2013	Unreleased	Unreleased	Unreleased	XBLA	XBO	
FlatOut: Ultimate Carnage	Racing, Vehicular combat	Bugbear Entertainment	Empire Interactive	Oct 2, 2007	Jun 22, 2007	Apr 24, 2008	Aug 1, 2007			
Flock!	Action & adventure	Proper Games	Capcom	Apr 8, 2009	Unreleased	Unreleased	Unreleased	XBLA	XBO	
Football Genius: The Ultimate Quiz	Sports & recreation	RTL Sports	I-Imagine Interactive	Sep 30, 2009	Unreleased	Unreleased	Unreleased	XBLA		
Football Manager 2006	Sports management	Sports Interactive	Sega Europe	Unreleased	Apr 13, 2006	Unreleased	Mar 23, 2006			
Football Manager 2007	Sports management	Sports Interactive	Sega Europe	Unreleased	Dec 1, 2006	Unreleased	Dec 7, 2006			
Football Manager 2008	Sports management	Sports Interactive	Sega Europe	Unreleased	Mar 28, 2008	Unreleased	Unreleased			
Forza Horizon	Racing, open world	Playground Games, Turn 10 Studios	Microsoft Studios	Oct 23, 2012	Oct 26, 2012	Oct 25, 2012	Oct 23, 2012	K	XBO XE	
Forza Horizon 2	Racing, open world	Sumo Digital, Turn 10 Studios	Microsoft Studios	Sep 30, 2014	Oct 3, 2014	Oct 2, 2014	Oct 2, 2014	K		
Forza Horizon 2 Presents Fast & Furious	Racing, open world, stand-alone expansion	Sumo Digital	Microsoft Studios	Mar 27, 2015	Mar 27, 2015	Mar 27, 2015	Mar 27, 2015	DL		
Forza Motorsport 2	Racing	Turn 10 Studios	Microsoft Game Studios	May 29, 2007	Jun 8, 2007	May 24, 2007	Jun 14, 2007			
Forza Motorsport 3	Racing	Turn 10 Studios	Microsoft Game Studios	Oct 27, 2009	Oct 23, 2009	Oct 22, 2009	Oct 22, 2009			
Forza Motorsport 4	Racing	Turn 10 Studios	Microsoft Studios	Oct 11, 2011	Oct 14, 2011	Oct 13, 2011	Oct 13, 2011	K		
Foul Play	Action & adventure	Mediatonic	Mastertronic Group	Sep 18, 2013	Unreleased	Unreleased	Unreleased	XBLA	XBO	
Fracture	Third-person shooter	Day 1 Studios	LucasArts	Oct 7, 2008	Oct 10, 2008	Oct 30, 2008	Nov 22, 2013			
Freefall Racers	Kinect	Smoking Gun Interactive	Deep Silver	Sep 6, 2013	Unreleased	Unreleased	Unreleased	K XBLA		
Fret Nice	Platformer	Pieces Interactive	Koei Tecmo	Feb 24, 2010	Unreleased	Unreleased	Unreleased	XBLA	XBO	
Frogger	Classics	Konami/Digital Eclipse	Konami	Jul 12, 2006	Unreleased	Unreleased	Unreleased	XBLA	XBO	
Frogger 2	Action & adventure	Voltex, Inc.	Konami	Jun 11, 2008	Unreleased	Unreleased	Unreleased	XBLA	XBO	
Frogger: Hyper Arcade Edition	Classics	Zombie Studios	Konami	Jul 6, 2012	Unreleased	Unreleased	Unreleased	XBLA		
From Dust	Strategy & simulation	Ubisoft Montpellier	Ubisoft	Jul 27, 2011	Unreleased	Unreleased	Unreleased	XBLA	XBO	
Front Mission Evolved	Tank & Mecha Sim, Third-person shooter	Double Helix Games	Square Enix	Sep 28, 2010	Oct 8, 2010	Sep 16, 2010	Nov 22, 2013			
Frontlines: Fuel of War	First-person shooter, action	Kaos Studios	THQ	Feb 25, 2008	Feb 29, 2008	Apr 24, 2008	Nov 22, 2013		XBO	
Frozen Free Fall: Snowball Fight	Puzzle & trivia	SuperVillain Studios	Disney Interactive Studios	Sep 15, 2015	Unreleased	Unreleased	Unreleased	XBLA		
Fruit Ninja Kinect	Kinect	Halfbrick Studios	Microsoft Studios	Aug 10, 2011	Unreleased	Unreleased	Unreleased	K XBLA		
Fuel	Racing, open world	Asobo Studios	Codemasters	Jun 2, 2009	Jun 12, 2009	Unreleased	Unreleased		XBO	
Full Auto	Vehicular combat	Pseudo Interactive	Sega	Feb 14, 2006	Feb 10, 2006	Sep 28, 2006	Mar 23, 2006			
Full House Poker	Card & board	Microsoft Studios/Krome Studios	Microsoft Studios	Mar 16, 2011	Unreleased	Unreleased	Unreleased	XBLA		
FunTown Mahjong	Card & board	FunTown World	Microsoft Game Studios	Jan 28, 2009	Unreleased	Unreleased	Unreleased	XBLA	XBO	
Fuse	Action	Insomniac Games	Electronic Arts	May 28, 2013	May 31, 2013	Unreleased	Nov 22, 2013			
Fusion: Genesis	Shooter	Starfire Studio	Microsoft Studios	Nov 9, 2011	Unreleased	Unreleased	Unreleased	XBLA		
Fuzion Frenzy 2	Party	Hudson Soft	Microsoft Game Studios	Jan 30, 2007	Feb 16, 2007	Feb 8, 2007	Feb 15, 2007			
G.I. Joe: The Rise of Cobra	Action	Double Helix Games	Electronic Arts	Aug 4, 2009	Aug 7, 2009	Unreleased	Nov 22, 2013			
Ge-Sen Love: Plus Pengo!	Platformer	Triangle Service	Triangle Service	Unreleased	Unreleased	Apr 24, 2014	Unreleased			
Gal Gun	Rail shooter	Inti Creates	Alchemist	Unreleased	Unreleased	Jan 27, 2011	Nov 22, 2013			
Galaga	Classics	Namco	Namco	Jul 26, 2006	Unreleased	Unreleased	Unreleased	XBLA	XBO	
Galaga Legions	Shooter	Namco	Namco	Aug 20, 2008	Unreleased	Unreleased	Unreleased	XBLA	XBO	
Galaga Legions DX	Shooter	Namco Bandai Games	Namco Bandai Games	Jun 29, 2011	Unreleased	Unreleased	Unreleased	XBLA	XBO	
Game of Thrones	Action Role-playing	Cyanide Studios	Atlus	May 15, 2012	Jun 8, 2012	Unreleased	Nov 22, 2013			
Game of Thrones	Graphic adventure	Telltale Games	Telltale Games	Dec 3, 2014	Feb 3, 2014	Unreleased	Nov 22, 2013			
Game Party: In Motion		FarSight Studios	Warner Bros. Interactive Entertainment	Nov 18, 2010	Nov 26, 2010	Dec 9, 2010	Unreleased	K		
Garou: Mark of the Wolves	Classics	SNK	SNK	Jun 24, 2009	Unreleased	Unreleased	Unreleased	XBLA	XBO	
Gatling Gears	Action & adventure	Vanguard Games	Electronic Arts	May 11, 2011	Unreleased	Unreleased	Unreleased	XBLA	XBO	
Gauntlet	Classics	Midway Games/ Digital Eclipse	Midway Games	Nov 22, 2005	Unreleased	Unreleased	Unreleased	XBLA		
Gears of War	Third-person shooter	Epic Games	Microsoft Game Studios	Nov 7, 2006	Nov 17, 2006	Jan 18, 2007	Nov 23, 2006		XBO	
Gears of War 2	Third-person shooter	Epic Games	Microsoft Game Studios	Nov 7, 2008	Nov 7, 2008	Jul 30, 2009	Nov 7, 2009		XBO XE	
Gears of War 3	Third-person shooter	Epic Games	Microsoft Studios	Sep 20, 2011	Sep 20, 2011	Sep 22, 2011	Sep 20, 2011	3D	XBO XE	
Gears of War: Judgment	Third-person shooter	People Can Fly	Microsoft Studios	Mar 19, 2013	Mar 22, 2013	Mar 21, 2013	Mar 19, 2013		XBO	
Gel: Set & Match	Puzzle & trivia	Gastronaut Studios	Microsoft Game Studios	May 20, 2009	May 20, 2009	May 20, 2009	May 20, 2009	XBLA		
Generator Rex: Agent of Providence	Action-adventure	Activision	Activision	Nov 1, 2011	Nov 4, 2011	Unreleased	Nov 22, 2013			
Geometry Wars 3: Dimensions	Action & adventure	Lucid Games	Activision	Nov 25, 2014	Unreleased	Unreleased	Unreleased	XBLA	XBO	
Geometry Wars 3: Dimensions Evolved	Action & adventure, update	Lucid Games	Sierra Entertainment	Jan 15, 2015	Unreleased	Unreleased	Unreleased	XBLA	XBO	
Geometry Wars: Retro Evolved	Action & adventure	Bizarre Creations	Microsoft Game Studios	Nov 22, 2005	Unreleased	Unreleased	Unreleased	XBLA	XBO	
Geometry Wars: Retro Evolved 2	Action & adventure	Bizarre Creations	Microsoft Game Studios	Jul 30, 2008	Unreleased	Unreleased	Unreleased	XBLA	XBO	
Geon: Emotions	Action & adventure	Strawdog Studios	Square Enix	Sep 19, 2007	Unreleased	Unreleased	Unreleased	XBLA		
Get Fit With Mel B		Lightning Fish	Deep Silver, Black Bean Games	Unreleased	Nov 26, 2010	Unreleased	Unreleased	K		
G-Force	Action, Platform	Eurocom	Disney Interactive Studios	Jul 21, 2009	Jul 21, 2009	Unreleased	Nov 22, 2013	3D		
Ghostbusters: Sanctum of Slime	Shooter	Behaviour Interactive	Atari	Mar 23, 2011	Unreleased	Unreleased	Unreleased	XBLA	XBO	
Ghostbusters: The Video Game	Action-adventure, Third-person shooter	Terminal Reality, Threewave Software	Atari	Jun 16, 2009	Jun 19, 2009	Unreleased	Nov 22, 2013		XBO	
Giana Sisters: Twisted Dreams	Action & adventure	Black Forest Games	bitComposer Interactive	Mar 20, 2013	Unreleased	Unreleased	Unreleased	XBLA		
Gin Rummy	Card & board	Studios Ch'in	Activision	Sep 3, 2008	Unreleased	Unreleased	Unreleased	XBLA	XBO	
Ginga Force	Shoot 'em up	Qute	Qute	Unreleased	Unreleased	Aug 30, 2012	Nov 22, 2013			
Girl Fight	Fighting	Kung Fu Factory	Majesco	Sep 25, 2013	Unreleased	Unreleased	Unreleased	XBLA	XBO	
Go! Go! Break Steady	Family & educational	Little Boy Games	Microsoft Game Studios	Jul 23, 2008	Unreleased	Unreleased	Unreleased	XBLA	XBO	
Goat Simulator	Action & adventure	Double Eleven	Double Eleven	Apr 17, 2015	Unreleased	Unreleased	Unreleased	XBLA	XBO	
Goat Simulator: Mmore Goatz Edition	Action & adventure	Double Eleven	Double Eleven	Aug 26, 2015	Unreleased	Unreleased	Unreleased	XBLA		
The Godfather: The Game	Action-adventure	EA Redwood Shores	Electronic Arts	Sep 19, 2006	Sep 22, 2006	Jan 25, 2007	Nov 22, 2006			
The Godfather II	Action-adventure, open world	EA Redwood Shores	Electronic Arts	Apr 7, 2009	Apr 9, 2009	Apr 16, 2009	Nov 22, 2009			
God Mode	Shooter	Old School Games	Atlus	Apr 19, 2013	Unreleased	Unreleased	Unreleased	XBLA		
Golden Axe	Classics	Sega/Digital Eclipse	Sega	Jul 11, 2007	Unreleased	Unreleased	Unreleased	XBLA	XBO	
Golden Axe: Beast Rider	Hack & Slash	Secret Level, Inc.	Sega	Oct 14, 2008	Oct 17, 2007	Unreleased	Oct 23, 2007			
Golden Fantasia X Ougon Musou Kyoku X	Fighting	07th Expansion	Alchemist	Unreleased	Unreleased	Oct 6, 2011	Unreleased			
The Golden Compass	Action-adventure	Shiny Entertainment	Sega	Dec 4, 2007	Nov 30, 2007	Unreleased	Dec 13, 2007			
GoldenEye 007: Reloaded	First-person shooter	Eurocom	Activision	Nov 1, 2011	Nov 4, 2011	Unreleased	Nov 22, 2013			
Golf: Tee It Up!	Sports & recreation	Housemarque	Activision	Jul 9, 2008	Unreleased	Unreleased	Unreleased	XBLA	XBO	
Goosebumps: The Game	Action & adventure	WayForward Technologies	GameMill Entertainment	Oct 14, 2015	Unreleased	Unreleased	Unreleased	XBLA		
Gotham City Impostors	Shooter	Monolith Productions	Warner Bros. Interactive Entertainment	Feb 8, 2012	Unreleased	Unreleased	Unreleased	XBLA		
Grand Slam Tennis 2	Sports	EA Canada	EA Sports	Feb 12, 2012	Feb 10, 2012	Unreleased	Nov 22, 2013			
Grand Theft Auto IV (Note: An episodic expansion pack titled Grand Theft Auto IV: The Lost and Damned was released exclusively on the Xbox Live Marketplace on February 17, 2009. A second episodic expansion pact titled Grand Theft Auto: The Ballad of Gay Tony was later released exclusively on the Xbox Live Marketplace on October 29, 2009. Both of these expansion packs were then released in a set titled Grand Theft Auto: Episodes from Liberty City exclusively on Xbox 360 on October 29, 2009, but later on PlayStation 3 and Microsoft Windows on April 13, 2010.)	Action-adventure, open world	Rockstar North	Rockstar Games, Capcom^{JP}	Apr 29, 2008	Apr 29, 2008	Oct 30, 2008	Nov 22, 2013		XBO	
Grand Theft Auto V	Action-adventure, open world	Rockstar North	Rockstar Games	Sep 17, 2013	Sep 17, 2013	Oct 10, 2013	Nov 22, 2013			
Grand Theft Auto: Episodes from Liberty City (Note: A compilation of Grand Theft Auto IV: The Lost and Damned and Grand Theft Auto: The Ballad of Gay Tony.)	Action-adventure, open world, stand-alone expansion	Rockstar North	Rockstar Games	Oct 29, 2009	Oct 29, 2009	Unreleased	Nov 22, 2013			
Grand Theft Auto Online	Action-adventure, open world, DLC	Rockstar North	Rockstar Games	Oct 1, 2013	Oct 1, 2013	Oct 1, 2013	Oct 1, 2013			
Grand Theft Auto: San Andreas	Action-adventure, open world	Rockstar North	Rockstar Games	Oct 30, 2015	Jul 17, 2015	Jul 17, 2015	Jul 17, 2015			
Gray Matter	Adventure	Wizarbox	dtp entertainment	Unreleased	Unreleased	Unreleased	Nov 22, 2013			
Grease Dance		Zoë Mode	505 Games	Oct 25, 2011	Nov 4, 2011	Unreleased	Unreleased	K		
Greed Corp	Strategy & simulation	W!Games	Valcon Games	Feb 24, 2010	Unreleased	Unreleased	Unreleased	XBLA		
Green Day: Rock Band	Music	Harmonix	MTV Games	Jun 8, 2010	Jun 11, 2010	Unreleased	Nov 22, 2013			
Green Lantern: Rise of the Manhunters	Action	Double Helix Games	Warner Bros. Interactive Entertainment	Jun 7, 2011	Jun 10, 2011	Unreleased	Nov 22, 2013	3D		
Greg Hastings' Paintball 2	First-person shooter	Majesco	Activision	Sep 14, 2010	Sep 14, 2010	Unreleased	Nov 22, 2013		XBO	
Grid 2	Racing	Codemasters Southam	Codemasters	May 28, 2013	May 31, 2013	Jul 25, 2013	May 30, 2013		XBO	
Grid Autosport	Racing	Codemasters Southam	Codemasters	Jun 24, 2014	Jun 27, 2014	Jun 24, 2014	Jun 26, 2014		XBO	
GripShift	Racing & flying	Sidhe Interactive	Microsoft Game Studios	Dec 12, 2007	Unreleased	Unreleased	Unreleased	XBLA	XBO	
Guacamelee!: Super Turbo Championship Edition	Action & adventure	DrinkBox Studios	Activision	Jul 2, 2014	Unreleased	Unreleased	Unreleased	XBLA		
Guardian Heroes	Action & adventure, Role playing	Treasure	Sega	Oct 12, 2011	Unreleased	Unreleased	Unreleased	XBLA	XBO	
Guardians of Middle-earth	Strategy & simulation	Monolith Productions	Warner Bros. Interactive Entertainment	Dec 5, 2012	Unreleased	Unreleased	Unreleased	XBLA		
Guilty Gear 2: Overture	Action-adventure, RTS	Arc System Works	505 Games	Oct 7, 2008	Sep 25, 2009	Nov 29, 2007	Nov 22, 2013			
Guilty Gear XX Accent Core Plus	Fighting	Arc System Works	Arc System Works	Oct 24, 2012	Unreleased	Unreleased	Unreleased	XBLA		
Guitar Hero 5	Music	Neversoft	Activision	Sep 1, 2009	Sep 11, 2009	Unreleased	Sep 16, 2009			
Guitar Hero: Aerosmith	Music	Neversoft	Activision	Jun 29, 2008	Jun 27, 2008	Unreleased	Aug 6, 2008			
Guitar Hero: Metallica	Music	Neversoft	Activision	Mar 29, 2009	May 29, 2009	Unreleased	May 27, 2009			
Guitar Hero: Van Halen	Music	Underground Development	Activision	Dec 22, 2009	Feb 19, 2010	Unreleased	Feb 17, 2010			
Guitar Hero: Warriors of Rock	Music	Neversoft	Activision	Sep 28, 2010	Sep 24, 2010	Unreleased	Sep 29, 2010			
Guitar Hero II	Music	Harmonix	RedOctane, Activision	Apr 3, 2007	Apr 6, 2007	Unreleased	Apr 4, 2007			
Guitar Hero III: Legends of Rock	Music	Neversoft	Activision	Oct 28, 2007	Nov 23, 2007	Jun 19, 2008	Nov 7, 2007			
Guitar Hero Live	Music	FreeStyleGames	Activision	Oct 20, 2015	Oct 23, 2015	Unreleased	Oct 20, 2015			
Guitar Hero Smash Hits	Music	Beenox	Activision	Jun 16, 2009	Jun 26, 2009	Unreleased	Jun 24, 2009			
Guitar Hero World Tour	Music	Neversoft	Activision	Oct 26, 2008	Nov 7, 2008	Unreleased	Nov 12, 2008			
Gun	Action-adventure	Neversoft	Activision	Nov 22, 2005	Dec 2, 2005	Unreleased	Mar 23, 2006			
Guncraft: Blocked & Loaded	Action & adventure	Exato Game Studios	GameMill Entertainment	Jul 14, 2015	Unreleased	Unreleased	Unreleased	XBLA		
Gunstar Heroes	Classics	Treasure/ Backbone Entertainment	Sega	Jun 10, 2009	Unreleased	Unreleased	Unreleased	XBLA	XBO	
The Gunstringer	Third-person shooter, rail shooter	Twisted Pixel Games	Microsoft Studios	Sep 13, 2011	Sep 16, 2011	Unreleased	Unreleased	K		
Guwange	Classics	Cave	Cave	Nov 10, 2010	Unreleased	Unreleased	Unreleased	XBLA	XBO	
Gyromancer	Puzzle & trivia	PopCap Games/ Square Enix	Square Enix	Nov 18, 2009	Unreleased	Unreleased	Unreleased	XBLA	XBO	
Gyruss	Classics	Konami/Digital Eclipse	Konami	Apr 18, 2007	Unreleased	Unreleased	Unreleased	XBLA	XBO	
Hail to the Chimp	Party	Wideload Games	Gamecock Media Group	Jun 24, 2008	Jun 19, 2009	Unreleased	Nov 22, 2013			
Half-Minute Hero: Super Mega Neo Climax	Role playing	Marvelous Entertainment	Microsoft Studios	Jun 29, 2011	Unreleased	Unreleased	Unreleased	XBLA	XBO	
Halo 3	First-person shooter	Bungie	Microsoft Game Studios	Sep 25, 2007	Sep 26, 2007	Sep 27, 2007	Sep 25, 2007		XBO XE	
Halo 3: ODST	First-person shooter	Bungie	Microsoft Game Studios	Sep 22, 2009	Sep 22, 2009	Sep 24, 2009	Sep 22, 2009		XBO	
Halo 4	First-person shooter	343 Industries	Microsoft Studios	Nov 6, 2012	Nov 6, 2012	Nov 6, 2012	Nov 6, 2012		XBO	
Halo: Combat Evolved Anniversary	First-person shooter	343 Industries/Saber Interactive	Microsoft Studios	Nov 15, 2011	Nov 15, 2011	Nov 15, 2011	Nov 15, 2011	3D K	XBO	
Halo: Reach	First-person shooter	Bungie	Microsoft Game Studios	Sep 14, 2010	Sep 14, 2010	Sep 14, 2010	Sep 14, 2010		XBO	
Halo: Spartan Assault	Shooter	343 Industries/ Vanguard Games	Microsoft Studios	Jan 31, 2014	Jan 31, 2014	Jan 31, 2014	Jan 31, 2014	XBLA	XBO	
Halo Wars	RTS	Ensemble Studios	Microsoft Game Studios	Mar 3, 2009	Feb 27, 2009	Feb 26, 2009	Feb 26, 2009		XBO	
Handball 16	Sports	Eko Software	Bigben Interactive	Nov 27, 2015	Nov 27, 2015	Unreleased	Nov 26, 2015			
Hannah Montana: The Movie	Adventure, Music	n-Space	Disney Interactive Studios	Apr 7, 2009	May 1, 2009	Unreleased	Nov 22, 2013			
Happy Feet Two: The Video Game	Adventure, Music	KMM Games	Warner Bros. Interactive Entertainment	Nov 8, 2011	Nov 25, 2011	Unreleased	Nov 22, 2013	3D		
Happy Tree Friends: False Alarm	Strategy & simulation	Stainless Games	Sega	Jun 25, 2008	Unreleased	Unreleased	Unreleased	XBLA		
Happy Wars	Action & adventure	Toylogic	Microsoft Studios	Oct 12, 2012	Unreleased	Unreleased	Unreleased	XBLA		
Hard Corps: Uprising	Action & adventure	Arc System Works	Konami	Feb 16, 2011	Unreleased	Unreleased	Unreleased	XBLA	XBO	
Hardwood Backgammon	Card & board	Silver Creek Entertainment	Microsoft Game Studios	Dec 8, 2005	Unreleased	Unreleased	Unreleased	XBLA	XBO	
Hardwood Hearts	Card & board	Silver Creek Entertainment	Microsoft Game Studios	Dec 8, 2005	Unreleased	Unreleased	Unreleased	XBLA	XBO	
Hardwood Spades	Card & board	Silver Creek Entertainment	Microsoft Game Studios	Dec 8, 2005	Unreleased	Unreleased	Unreleased	XBLA	XBO	
Harley Pasternak's Hollywood Workout		Heavy Iron Studios	Majesco	Sep 18, 2012	Unreleased	Unreleased	Unreleased	K		
Harms Way	Racing & flying	Bongfish	Microsoft Game Studios	Dec 8, 2010	Unreleased	Unreleased	Unreleased	XBLA	XBO	
Harry Potter and the Deathly Hallows: Part I	Third-person shooter	EA Bright Light	Electronic Arts	Nov 16, 2010	Nov 19, 2010	Unreleased	Nov 22, 2013	K		
Harry Potter and the Deathly Hallows: Part II	Third-person shooter	EA Bright Light	Electronic Arts	Jul 12, 2011	Jul 15, 2011	Unreleased	Nov 22, 2013			
Harry Potter and the Half-Blood Prince	Third-person shooter	EA Bright Light	Electronic Arts	Jun 30, 2009	Jul 3, 2009	Unreleased	Nov 22, 2013			
Harry Potter and the Order of the Phoenix	Action-adventure	EA Bright Light	Electronic Arts	Jun 25, 2007	Jun 29, 2007	Nov 22, 2007	Nov 22, 2013			
Harry Potter for Kinect		Eurocom	Warner Bros. Interactive Entertainment	Oct 9, 2012	Unreleased	Unreleased	Unreleased	K		
Hasbro Family Game Night	Party	EA Bright Light	Electronic Arts	Nov 10, 2009	Nov 13, 2009	Unreleased	Nov 22, 2013	XBLA		
Hasbro Family Game Night 2 (Note: The game was exclusively included in a single-disc bundle with Hasbro Family Game Night 3.)	Party	EA Bright Light	Electronic Arts	Nov 1, 2011	Unreleased	Unreleased	Unreleased			
Hasbro Family Game Night 3	Party	EA Bright Light	Electronic Arts	Oct 25, 2010	Nov 5, 2010	Unreleased	Nov 22, 2013			
Hasbro Family Game Night 4: The Game Show	Party	Wahoo Studios/EA Salt Lake	Electronic Arts	Nov 1, 2011	Nov 4, 2011	Unreleased	Nov 22, 2013	K		
Hasbro Family Game Night: Battleship	Party	EA Bright Light	Electronic Arts	Mar 18, 2009	Mar 18, 2009	Unreleased	Mar 18, 2009	XBLA		
Hasbro Family Game Night: Boggle	Party	EA Bright Light	Electronic Arts	Mar 18, 2009	Mar 18, 2009	Unreleased	Mar 18, 2009	XBLA		
Hasbro Family Game Night: Connect Four	Party	EA Bright Light	Electronic Arts	Mar 18, 2009	Mar 18, 2009	Unreleased	Mar 18, 2009	XBLA		
Hasbro Family Game Night: Connect 4x4	Party	EA Bright Light	Electronic Arts	Jun 23, 2010	Jun 23, 2010	Unreleased	Jun 23, 2010	XBLA		
Hasbro Family Game Night: Jenga	Party	EA Bright Light	Electronic Arts	Jun 23, 2010	Jun 23, 2010	Unreleased	Jun 23, 2010	XBLA		
Hasbro Family Game Night: Pictureka!	Party	EA Bright Light	Electronic Arts	Jun 23, 2010	Jun 23, 2010	Unreleased	Jun 23, 2010	XBLA		
Hasbro Family Game Night: Scrabble	Party	EA Bright Light	Electronic Arts	Mar 18, 2009	Unreleased	Unreleased	Unreleased	XBLA		
Hasbro Family Game Night: Sorry!	Party	EA Bright Light	Electronic Arts	Mar 18, 2009	Mar 18, 2009	Unreleased	Mar 18, 2009	XBLA		
Hasbro Family Game Night: Sorry! Sliders	Party	EA Bright Light	Electronic Arts	Mar 18, 2009	Mar 18, 2009	Unreleased	Mar 18, 2009	XBLA		
Hasbro Family Game Night: Yahtzee	Party	EA Bright Light	Electronic Arts	Mar 18, 2009	Mar 18, 2009	Unreleased	Mar 18, 2009	XBLA		
Haunt	Kinect	NanaOn-Sha	Microsoft Studios	Jan 18, 2012	Unreleased	Unreleased	Unreleased	K XBLA		
Haunted House	Action & adventure	ImaginEngine	Atari	Oct 28, 2010	Unreleased	Unreleased	Unreleased	XBLA	XBO	
Heavy Fire: Shattered Spear	Rail shooter	Teyon	Mastiff	Jan 29, 2013	Aug 2, 2013	Jan 24, 2013	Unreleased			
Heavy Weapon	Action & adventure	PopCap Games	Microsoft Game Studios	Jan 17, 2007	Unreleased	Unreleased	Unreleased	XBLA	XBO	
Hell Yeah! Wrath of the Dead Rabbit	Action & adventure	Arkedo Studio	Sega	Sep 26, 2012	Unreleased	Unreleased	Unreleased	XBLA		
Hellboy: The Science of Evil	Action	Krome Studios	Konami	Jun 24, 2008	Aug 29, 2008	Unreleased	Aug 22, 2008			
Heroes Over Europe	Combat flight simulation game	Transmission Games	Ubisoft	Sep 15, 2009	Sep 18, 2009	Unreleased	Sep 17, 2013			
Hexic 2	Puzzle & trivia	Carbonated Games	Microsoft Game Studios	Aug 15, 2007	Unreleased	Unreleased	Unreleased	XBLA	XBO	
Hexic HD	Puzzle & trivia	Carbonated Games	Microsoft Game Studios	Nov 22, 2005	Unreleased	Unreleased	Unreleased	XBLA	XBO	
Hexodius	Shooter	Brain Slap Studio	Bandai Namco Entertainment	Oct 16, 2013	Unreleased	Unreleased	Unreleased	XBLA		
High School Musical 3: Senior Year Dance	Music	Page 44 Studios	Disney Interactive Studios	Oct 28, 2008	Nov 7, 2008	Unreleased	Nov 22, 2013			
The Hip Hop Dance Experience	Dance	iNiS	Ubisoft	Nov 13, 2012	Nov 13, 2012	Unreleased	Unreleased	K		
The History Channel: Battle for the Pacific	First-person shooter	Cauldron	Activision Value	Nov 30, 2007	Mar 7, 2008	Unreleased	Nov 22, 2013			
The History Channel: Civil War – A Nation Divided	First-person shooter	Cauldron	Activision Value	Nov 7, 2006	Nov 7, 2006	Unreleased	Nov 22, 2013			
The History Channel: Great Battles Medieval	First-person shooter	Slitherine	Slitherine	May 6, 2011	May 6, 2011	Unreleased	Nov 22, 2013			
History – Civil War: Secret Missions	First-person shooter, Stealth	Cauldron	Activision Value	Nov 4, 2008	Nov 4, 2008	Unreleased	Nov 22, 2013			
History – Great Battles: Medieval	Real-time tactics	Slitherine Software	Slitherine Software	May 3, 2011	Sep 30, 2010	Unreleased	Unreleased			
Hitman HD Trilogy	Stealth	IO Interactive	Square Enix	Jan 29, 2013	Feb 1, 2013	Jan 31, 2013	Jan 31, 2013		XBO	
Hitman: Absolution	Stealth	IO Interactive	Square Enix	Nov 20, 2012	Nov 20, 2012	Nov 20, 2012	Nov 20, 2012		XBO	
Hitman: Blood Money	Stealth; third-person shooter; First-person shooter	IO Interactive	Eidos Interactive	May 30, 2006	May 26, 2006	Jun 9, 2006	May 26, 2006		XBO	
Hitman: Sniper Challenge	Action	Io Interactive	Square Enix	May 15, 2012	May 15, 2012	Unreleased	May 15, 2012			
Hole in the Wall	Kinect	Ludia	Microsoft Studios	Aug 24, 2011	Unreleased	Unreleased	Unreleased	K XBLA		
Hole in the Wall: Deluxe Edition	Party game	Ludia	Microsoft Studios	Nov 20, 2011	Unreleased	Unreleased	Unreleased			
Home Run Stars	Kinect	Smoking Gun Interactive	Microsoft Studios	Oct 26, 2012	Unreleased	Unreleased	Unreleased	K XBLA		
Homefront	First-person shooter	Kaos Studios	THQ	Feb 22, 2011	Feb 22, 2011	Feb 22, 2011	Nov 22, 2013			
Hot Wheels World's Best Driver	Racing, Vehicular Combat	Firebrand Games	Warner Bros. Interactive Entertainment	Sep 17, 2013	Sep 27, 2013	Unreleased	Oct 2, 2013			
Hot Wheels: Beat That!	Racing, Vehicular Combat	Eutechnyx	Activision	Sep 25, 2007	Dec 7, 2007	Unreleased	Unreleased			
Hour of Victory	First-person shooter	nFusion	Midway Games	Jun 25, 2007	Jun 29, 2007	Unreleased	Nov 22, 2013			
How to Survive	Action & adventure	EKO Software	505 Games	Oct 23, 2013	Unreleased	Unreleased	Unreleased	XBLA		
How to Train Your Dragon	Action-adventure	Étranges Libellules	Activision	Mar 23, 2010	Mar 26, 2010	Unreleased	Nov 22, 2013			
How to Train Your Dragon 2	Action-adventure	Little Orbit	Torus Games	Jun 13, 2014	Jun 13, 2014	Unreleased	Nov 22, 2013			
Hulk Hogan's Main Event		Panic Button	Majesco, 505 Games	Oct 11, 2011	Nov 18, 2011	Unreleased	Unreleased	K		
Hunted: The Demon's Forge	Action	InXile Entertainment	Bethesda Softworks	May 31, 2011	Jun 3, 2011	Aug 25, 2011	Nov 22, 2013			
Hunter's Trophy 2: America	Shooter	Kylotonn Entertainment	Bigben Interactive	May 17, 2013	Unreleased	Unreleased	Unreleased	XBLA		
Hunter's Trophy 2: Australia	Shooter	Kylotonn Entertainment	Bigben Interactive	May 29, 2013	Unreleased	Unreleased	Unreleased	XBLA		
Hunter's Trophy 2: Europa	Shooter	Kylotonn Entertainment	Bigben Interactive	Jun 18, 2013	Unreleased	Unreleased	Unreleased	XBLA		
Hybrid	Shooter	5th Cell	Microsoft Studios	Aug 8, 2012	Unreleased	Unreleased	Unreleased	XBLA		
Hydro Thunder Hurricane	Racing & flying	Vector Unit	Microsoft Game Studios	Jul 28, 2010	Unreleased	Unreleased	Unreleased	XBLA	XBO	
Hydrophobia	Action & adventure	Dark Energy Digital	Microsoft Game Studios	Sep 29, 2010	Unreleased	Unreleased	Unreleased	XBLA	XBO	
I Am Alive	Action & adventure	Ubisoft Shanghai	Ubisoft	Mar 7, 2012	Unreleased	Unreleased	Unreleased	XBLA	XBO	
Ice Age: Continental Drift - Arctic Games		Behaviour Interactive	Activision	Jul 10, 2012	Jun 29, 2012	Unreleased	Unreleased	K		
Ice Age: Dawn of the Dinosaurs	Platform	Eurocom	Activision	Jun 30, 2009	Jun 26, 2009	Unreleased	Nov 22, 2013			
The Idolmaster	Music, Sim	Namco Bandai Games	Namco Bandai Games	Unreleased	Unreleased	Jan 25, 2007	Unreleased			
The Idolmaster Live For You!	Music, Sim	Namco Bandai Games	Namco Bandai Games	Unreleased	Unreleased	Feb 28, 2008	Unreleased			
The Idolmaster 2	Music, Sim	Namco Bandai Games	Namco Bandai Games	Unreleased	Unreleased	Feb 24, 2011	Unreleased			
IHF Handball Challenge 14	Sports	Neutron Games	Bigben Interactive	Unreleased	Mar 28, 2014	Unreleased	Unreleased			
Ikaruga	Shooter	Treasure	Microsoft Game Studios	Apr 9, 2008	Unreleased	Unreleased	Unreleased	XBLA	XBO	
IL-2 Sturmovik: Birds of Prey	Combat flight simulation game	Gaijin Entertainment	1C Company	Sep 8, 2009	Sep 4, 2009	Unreleased	Nov 22, 2013			
Ilomilo	Puzzle & trivia	Southend Interactive	Microsoft Game Studios	Jan 5, 2011	Unreleased	Unreleased	Unreleased	XBLA	XBO	
Import Tuner Challenge (Note: Shutokou Battle Ten in Japan.)	Racing	Genki	Ubisoft	Sep 26, 2006	Oct 6, 2006	Jul 27, 2006	Oct 5, 2006			
The Incredible Hulk	Action, open world	Edge of Reality	Sega	Jun 5, 2008	Jun 27, 2008	Unreleased	Jun 26, 2008			
Indianapolis 500 Evolution	Racing	Brain in a Jar	Destineer	Sep 30, 2009	Sep 30, 2009	Unreleased	Unreleased			
Infernal: Hell's Vengeance	Third-person shooter, action-adventure	Metropolis Software	Playlogic	Jun 30, 2009	Aug 28, 2009	Dec 24, 2009	Nov 22, 2013			
Inferno Pool	Sports & recreation	Dark Energy Digital	Koch Media	Oct 28, 2009	Unreleased	Unreleased	Unreleased	XBLA		
Infinite Undiscovery	Action Role-playing	tri-Ace	Square Enix	Sep 2, 2008	Sep 5, 2008	Sep 11, 2008	Sep 4, 2008		XBO	
Injustice: Gods Among Us	Fighting	NetherRealm Studios	Warner Bros. Interactive Entertainment	Apr 16, 2013	Apr 19, 2013	Unreleased	Nov 22, 2013		XBO	
Insanely Twisted Shadow Planet	Action & adventure	Shadow Planet Productions (Fuelcell Games/Gagne International)	Microsoft Studios	Aug 3, 2011	Unreleased	Unreleased	Unreleased	XBLA	XBO	
Instant Brain	Visual novel	CAVE	CAVE	Unreleased	Unreleased	Nov 10, 2011	Unreleased			
Intel Discovered	Kinect	Wahoo Studios	Microsoft Studios	Oct 15, 2012	Unreleased	Unreleased	Unreleased	K XBLA		
International Cricket 2010	Sports	Trickstar Games	Codemasters	Unreleased	Jun 18, 2010	Unreleased	Oct 21, 2010			
Interpol: The Trail of Dr. Chaos	Puzzle & trivia	TikGames	Microsoft Game Studios	Jan 7, 2009	Unreleased	Unreleased	Unreleased	XBLA	XBO	
Inversion	Third-person shooter	Saber Interactive	Namco Bandai Games	Jun 5, 2012	Jun 8, 2012	Unreleased	Nov 22, 2013			
Invincible Tiger: The Legend of Han Tao	Action & adventure	Blitz Arcade	Bandai Namco Entertainment	Aug 26, 2009	Unreleased	Unreleased	Unreleased	XBLA		
Ion Assault	Action & adventure	Coreplay	Black Inc.	Sep 23, 2009	Unreleased	Unreleased	Unreleased	XBLA		
Iron Brigade	Shooter	Double Fine Productions	Microsoft Studios	Jun 22, 2011	Unreleased	Unreleased	Unreleased	XBLA	XBO	
Iron Man	Action	Secret Level, Inc.	Sega	May 2, 2008	May 2, 2008	Unreleased	May 8, 2008			
Iron Man 2	Action-adventure	Sega Studio USA	Sega	May 4, 2010	Apr 30, 2010	Unreleased	Apr 29, 2010			
Iron Sky: Invasion	Space simulation	Reality Pump	TopWare Interactive	Unreleased	Unreleased	Unreleased	Nov 22, 2013			
Islands of Wakfu	Role playing	Ankama Games	Microsoft Studios	Mar 30, 2011	Unreleased	Unreleased	Unreleased	XBLA		
The Jackbox Party Pack	Party	Jackbox Games	Jackbox Games	Nov 3, 2014	Nov 3, 2015	Unreleased	Nov 3, 2015			
JAM Live Music Arcade	Puzzle & trivia	Zivix	505 Games	May 16, 2012	Unreleased	Unreleased	Unreleased	XBLA		
James Bond 007: Blood Stone	Third-person shooter	Bizarre Creations	Activision	Nov 2, 2010	Nov 5, 2010	Jan 13, 2011	Nov 3, 2010			
James Cameron's Avatar: The Game	Third-person shooter, action-adventure	Ubisoft Montreal	Ubisoft, Lightstorm Entertainment, 20th Century Fox Games	Dec 1, 2009	Dec 1, 2009	Dec 1, 2009	Dec 1, 2009	3D		
Janline	Card & board	Recom	Recom	Unreleased	Unreleased	Sep 25, 2008	Unreleased			
JASF: Jane's Advanced Strike Fighters	Combat flight simulation game	Trickstar Games	Maximum Family Games	Oct 18, 2011	Nov 28, 2011	Unreleased	Nov 22, 2013			
Jeopardy!: America's Favorite Quiz Show	Trivia	Pipeworks Software	THQ	Oct 16, 2012	Oct 16, 2012	Unreleased	Nov 22, 2013			
Jeremy McGrath's Offroad	Racing & flying	2XL Games	D3 Publisher	Jun 27, 2012	Unreleased	Unreleased	Unreleased	XBLA	XBO	
Jet Car Stunts	Racing & flying	Grip Digital	bitComposer Interactive	Oct 1, 2014	Unreleased	Unreleased	Unreleased	XBLA		
Jet Set Radio	Action & adventure	Smilebit	Sega	Sep 19, 2012	Unreleased	Unreleased	Unreleased	XBLA	XBO	
Jetpac Refuelled	Classics	Rare	Microsoft Game Studios	Mar 28, 2007	Unreleased	Unreleased	Unreleased	XBLA	XBO	
Jewel Quest	Puzzle & trivia	iWin Games/CTXM	Microsoft Game Studios	Mar 8, 2006	Unreleased	Unreleased	Unreleased	XBLA	XBO	
Jillian Michaels' Fitness Adventure		n-Space	Majesco, 505 Games	Nov 8, 2011	Nov 18, 2011	Unreleased	Unreleased	K		
Jimmie Johnson's Anything with an Engine	Racing	Isopod Labs	Autumn Games	Nov 1, 2011	Unreleased	Unreleased	Unreleased			
Joe Danger 2: The Movie	Racing & flying	Hello Games	Microsoft Studios	Sep 14, 2012	Unreleased	Unreleased	Unreleased	XBLA	XBO	
Joe Danger: Special Edition	Racing & flying	Hello Games	Microsoft Studios	Dec 14, 2011	Unreleased	Unreleased	Unreleased	XBLA	XBO	
JoJo's Bizarre Adventure HD Ver.	Fighting	Capcom	Capcom	Aug 22, 2012	Unreleased	Unreleased	Unreleased	XBLA		
Jonah Lomu Rugby Challenge	Rugby	Tru Blu Games	Tru Blu Games	Oct 18, 2011	Oct 18, 2011	Unreleased	Nov 22, 2013			
Joust	Classics	Midway Games/ Digital Eclipse	Midway Games	Nov 22, 2005	Unreleased	Unreleased	Unreleased	XBLA	XBO	
Joy Ride Turbo	Racing & flying	BigPark	Microsoft Studios	May 23, 2012	Unreleased	Unreleased	Unreleased	XBLA	XBO	
Juiced 2: Hot Import Nights (Note: Drift Nights: Juiced 2 in Japan.)	Racing	Juice Games	THQ	Sep 17, 2007	Sep 28, 2007	Jan 17, 2008	Sep 25, 2007			
Juju	Platformer	Flying Wild Hog	THQ Nordic	Dec 10, 2014	Unreleased	Unreleased	Unreleased	XBLA	XBO	
Jumper: Griffin's Story	Action	Redtribe	Brash Entertainment	Feb 12, 2008	Feb 22, 2008	Unreleased	Nov 22, 2013			
Jurassic Park: The Game	Graphic adventure	Telltale Games	Telltale Games	Nov 15, 2011	Nov 15, 2011	Unreleased	Nov 22, 2013		XBO	
Jurassic: The Hunted	First-person shooter	Cauldron	Activision	Nov 3, 2009	Nov 3, 2009	Unreleased	Nov 22, 2013			
Just Cause	Third-person shooter, action-adventure, open world	Avalanche Studios	Eidos Interactive	Sep 27, 2006	Sep 22, 2006	Nov 8, 2006	Sep 29, 2006		XBO	
Just Cause 2	Third-person shooter, action-adventure, open world	Avalanche Studios	Eidos Interactive, Square Enix	Mar 23, 2010	Mar 26, 2010	May 10, 2010	Apr 1, 2010		XBO	
Just Dance 3	Rhythm	Ubisoft Montreal	Ubisoft	Oct 7, 2011	Oct 11, 2011	Unreleased	Oct 11, 2011	K		
Just Dance 4	Rhythm	Ubisoft Paris	Ubisoft	Oct 9, 2012	Oct 2, 2012	Unreleased	Oct 2, 2012	K		
Just Dance 2014	Rhythm	Ubisoft Paris	Ubisoft	Oct 9, 2013	Oct 2, 2013	Unreleased	Oct 1, 2013	K		
Just Dance 2015	Rhythm	Ubisoft Paris	Ubisoft	Oct 25, 2014	Oct 23, 2014	Unreleased	Oct 23, 2014	K		
Just Dance 2016	Rhythm	Ubisoft Paris	Ubisoft	Oct 20, 2015	Oct 22, 2015	Unreleased	Oct 23, 2015	K		
Just Dance 2017	Rhythm	Ubisoft Paris	Ubisoft	Oct 25, 2016	Oct 27, 2016	Unreleased	Oct 29, 2016	K		
Just Dance 2018	Rhythm	Ubisoft Paris	Ubisoft	Oct 24, 2017	Oct 26, 2017	Unreleased	Oct 26, 2017	K		
Just Dance 2019	Rhythm	Ubisoft Paris	Ubisoft	Oct 23, 2018	Oct 25, 2018	Unreleased	Oct 25, 2018	K		
Just Dance: Disney Party	Rhythm	Land Ho!	Ubisoft	Oct 23, 2012	Oct 26, 2012	Unreleased	Oct 25, 2012	K		
Just Dance: Disney Party 2	Rhythm	Ubisoft San Francisco	Ubisoft	Oct 20, 2015	Oct 20, 2015	Unreleased	Unreleased	K		
Just Dance: Greatest Hits	Rhythm	Ubisoft Montreal	Ubisoft	Jun 26, 2012	Jun 22, 2012	Unreleased	Jun 21, 2012	K		
Just Dance Kids 2 (Note: Known as Just Dance Kids in Australia and Europe.)	Rhythm	Land Ho!	Ubisoft	Oct 25, 2011	Nov 4, 2011	Unreleased	Nov 3, 2011	K		
Just Dance Kids 2014	Rhythm	Ubisoft Osaka	Ubisoft	Oct 22, 2013	Oct 25, 2013	Unreleased	Oct 24, 2013	K		
Kameo	Action-adventure	Rare	Microsoft Game Studios	Nov 22, 2005	Dec 2, 2005	Feb 2, 2006	Mar 23, 2006		XBO XE	
Kane & Lynch 2: Dog Days	Third-person shooter	IO Interactive	Eidos Interactive	Aug 17, 2010	Aug 20, 2010	Unreleased	Aug 19, 2010		XBO	
Kane & Lynch: Dead Men	Third-person shooter	IO Interactive	Eidos Interactive	Nov 14, 2007	Nov 23, 2007	Jul 10, 2008	Dec 6, 2007			
Karaoke	Music	iNiS	Microsoft Studios	Dec 11, 2012	Dec 11, 2012	Unreleased	Dec 11, 2012	XBLA		
Karaoke Revolution	Music	Blitz Games	Konami	Nov 24, 2009	Unreleased	Unreleased	Unreleased			
Karaoke Revolution Glee: Volume 3	Music	Blitz Games	Konami	Nov 22, 2011	Dec 2, 2011	Unreleased	Dec 1, 2011			
Karaoke Revolution Presents: American Idol Encore	Music	Blitz Games	Konami	Feb 5, 2008	Unreleased	Unreleased	Unreleased			
Karaoke Revolution Presents: American Idol Encore 2	Music	Blitz Games	Konami	Nov 18, 2008	Unreleased	Unreleased	Unreleased			
Karateka	Fighting	Liquid Entertainment	D3 Publisher	Nov 7, 2012	Unreleased	Unreleased	Unreleased	XBLA		
Kengo: Legend of the 9	Fighting	Genki	Majesco	Sep 11, 2007	Nov 16, 2007	Sep 7, 2007	Nov 15, 2007			
Ketsui: Kizuna Jigoku Tachi EXTRA	Bullet hell	Cave	5pb.	Unreleased	Unreleased	Apr 22, 2010	Unreleased			
Kick-Ass 2: The Game	Action, Beat 'em up	Freedom Factory	UIG Entertainment	Unreleased	Aug 1, 2014	Unreleased	Aug 1, 2014			
Killer is Dead	Action, Hack & slash	Grasshopper Manufacture	Xseed Games^{NA}, Deep Silver^{PAL EU}, Kadokawa Games^{JP}	Aug 27, 2013	Aug 30, 2013	Aug 1, 2013	Aug 29, 2013		XBO	
Kinect Adventures	Kinect	Good Science Studio	Microsoft Game Studios	Nov 4, 2010	Nov 10, 2010	Nov 18, 2010	Nov 20, 2010	K		
Kinect Disneyland Adventures	Kinect	Frontier Developments	Microsoft Studios	Nov 15, 2011	Nov 18, 2011	Nov 17, 2011	Dec 8, 2011	K		
Kinect Fun Labs	Kinect	Good Science Studio	Microsoft Studios	June 6, 2011	Unreleased	Unreleased	Unreleased	K XBLA		
Kinect Joy Ride	Kinect	BigPark	Microsoft Game Studios	Nov 4, 2010	Nov 10, 2010	Nov 18, 2010	Jan 20, 2011	K		
Kinect Nat Geo TV	Kinect	Relentless Software	Microsoft Studios	Sep 18, 2012	Sep 18, 2012	Unreleased	Unreleased	K		
Kinect Party	Kinect	Double Fine Productions	Microsoft Studios	Dec 17, 2012	Unreleased	Unreleased	Unreleased	K XBLA		
Kinect Playfit	Kinect	Double Fine Productions	Microsoft Studios	Jul 12, 2012	Unreleased	Unreleased	Unreleased	K XBLA		
Kinect Rush: A Disney-Pixar Adventure	Kinect	Asobo Studios	Microsoft Studios, Disney Interactive Studios	Mar 20, 2012	Mar 23, 2012	Mar 22, 2012	Mar 22, 2012	K		
Kinect Sesame Street TV	Kinect	Microsoft Studios - Soho Productions	Microsoft Studios	Mar 20, 2012	Mar 23, 2012	Unreleased	Unreleased	K		
Kinect Sports	Kinect	Rare	Microsoft Game Studios	Nov 4, 2010	Nov 3, 2010	Nov 4, 2010	Nov 20, 2010	K		
Kinect Sports: Season Two	Kinect	Rare; BigPark	Microsoft Studios	Oct 25, 2011	Oct 28, 2011	Oct 27, 2011	Oct 27, 2011	K		
Kinect Sports: Ultimate Collection	Kinect	Rare; BigPark	Microsoft Studios	Sep 18, 2012	Unreleased	Unreleased	Unreleased	K		
Kinect Sports Gems: 10 Frame Bowling	Kinect	Rare	Microsoft Studios	Mar 12, 2013	Unreleased	Unreleased	Unreleased	XBLA		
Kinect Sports Gems: 3 Point Contest	Kinect	Rare	Microsoft Studios	Nov 20, 2012	Unreleased	Unreleased	Unreleased	XBLA		
Kinect Sports Gems: Boxing Fight	Kinect	Rare	Microsoft Studios	Jun 25, 2013	Unreleased	Unreleased	Unreleased	XBLA		
Kinect Sports Gems: Darts vs. Zombies	Kinect	Rare	Microsoft Studios	Nov 20, 2012	Unreleased	Unreleased	Unreleased	XBLA		
Kinect Sports Gems: Field Goal Contest	Kinect	Rare	Microsoft Studios	Dec 25, 2012	Unreleased	Unreleased	Unreleased	XBLA		
Kinect Sports Gems: Penalty Saver	Kinect	Rare	Microsoft Studios	Mar 12, 2013	Unreleased	Unreleased	Unreleased	XBLA		
Kinect Sports Gems: Ping Pong	Kinect	Rare	Microsoft Studios	Mar 12, 2013	Unreleased	Unreleased	Unreleased	XBLA		
Kinect Sports Gems: Prize Driver	Kinect	Rare	Microsoft Studios	Dec 25, 2012	Unreleased	Unreleased	Unreleased	XBLA		
Kinect Sports Gems: Reaction Rally	Kinect	Rare	Microsoft Studios	Dec 25, 2012	Unreleased	Unreleased	Unreleased	XBLA		
Kinect Sports Gems: Ski Race	Kinect	Rare	Microsoft Studios	Nov 20, 2012	Unreleased	Unreleased	Unreleased	XBLA		
Kinect Star Wars	Kinect	Terminal Reality; LucasArts	Microsoft Studios	Apr 3, 2012	Apr 3, 2012	Apr 5, 2012	Apr 5, 2012	3D K		
Kinectimals	Kinect	Frontier Developments	Microsoft Game Studios	Nov 4, 2010	Nov 10, 2010	Nov 18, 2010	Dec 9, 2010	K		
Kinectimals: Now with Bears!	Kinect, update	Frontier Developments	Microsoft Studios	Oct 11, 2011	Oct 11, 2011	Oct 11, 2011	Oct 11, 2011	K		
A Kingdom for Keflings	Strategy & simulation	NinjaBee	Microsoft Game Studios	Nov 19, 2008	Unreleased	Unreleased	Unreleased	XBLA	XBO	
Kingdoms of Amalur: Reckoning	Action Role-playing, open world	38 Studios, Big Huge Games	Electronic Arts	Feb 7, 2012	Feb 10, 2012	Unreleased	Feb 9, 2012		XBO	
Kingdom Under Fire: Circle of Doom	Action Role-playing	Blueside	Microsoft Game Studios	Jan 8, 2008	Feb 1, 2008	Dec 13, 2007	Dec 5, 2007			
The King of Fighters '98 Ultimate Match	Classics	SNK	SNK	Jul 1, 2009	Unreleased	Unreleased	Unreleased	XBLA	XBO	
The King of Fighters 2002: Unlimited Match	Classics	SNK	SNK	Nov 3, 2010	Unreleased	Unreleased	Unreleased	XBLA	XBO	
King of Fighters: Sky Stage	Shooter	Moss	SNK	Sep 15, 2010	Unreleased	Unreleased	Unreleased	XBLA	XBO	
The King of Fighters XIII	Fighting	SNK Playmore	Atlus, Rising Star Games^{EU}, SNK Playmore^{JP}	Nov 22, 2011	Nov 25, 2011	Dec 1, 2011	Nov 24, 2011		XBO	
King's Quest: The Complete Collection	Point and Click	Sierra	Sierra Studios	Oct 18, 2016	Oct 18, 2016	Unreleased	Oct 18, 2016			
Knights Contract	Action-adventure	Game Republic	Namco Bandai Games	Feb 22, 2011	Feb 25, 2011	Jul 7, 2011	Feb 24, 2011			
Konami Classics Vol. 1	Compilation	Konami	Konami	Dec 15, 2009	Unreleased	Unreleased	Unreleased			
Konami Classics Vol. 2	Compilation	Konami	Konami	Dec 15, 2009	Unreleased	Unreleased	Unreleased			
KrissX	Puzzle & trivia	Regolith Games	Konami	Jan 27, 2010	Unreleased	Unreleased	Unreleased	XBLA		
Kung Fu High Impact		Virtual Air Guitar	Ignition Entertainment, Black Bean Games	Nov 15, 2011	Nov 25, 2011	Nov 24, 2011	Unreleased	K		
Kung Fu Panda	Action-adventure; platformer	Luxoflux	Activision	Jun 3, 2008	Jun 23, 2008	Unreleased	Jun 5, 2008			
Kung Fu Panda 2	Action-adventure	Griptonite Games	THQ	May 24, 2011	Jun 10, 2011	Jun 16, 2011	Unreleased	K		
Kung Fu Panda: Showdown of Legendary Legends	Action-adventure	Vicious Cycle Software	Little Orbit	Dec 1, 2015	Dec 1, 2015	Unreleased	Nov 30, 2015			
Kung Fu Strike: The Warrior's Rise	Fighting	QOOCsoft	7sixty	Sep 5, 2012	Unreleased	Unreleased	Unreleased	XBLA		
L.A. Noire	Third-person shooter, action-adventure, open world	Team Bondi	Rockstar Games	May 17, 2011	May 20, 2011	Jul 7, 2011	May 20, 2011			
Lara Croft and the Guardian of Light	Action & adventure	Crystal Dynamics	Square Enix Europe	Aug 18, 2010	Unreleased	Unreleased	Unreleased	XBLA	XBO	
The Last Remnant	RPG	Square Enix	Square Enix	Nov 20, 2008	Nov 21, 2008	Nov 20, 2008	Nov 20, 2008			
Lazy Raiders	Action & adventure	Sarbakan	Microsoft Game Studios	Feb 24, 2010	Unreleased	Unreleased	Unreleased	XBLA	XBO	
Leedmees	Kinect	Konami	Konami	Sep 7, 2011	Unreleased	Unreleased	Unreleased	K XBLA		
Left 4 Dead	First-person shooter, survival horror	Valve	Electronic Arts	Nov 17, 2008	Nov 21, 2008	Jan 22, 2009	Nov 18, 2008		XBO XE	
Left 4 Dead 2	First-person shooter, survival horror	Valve	Electronic Arts	Nov 17, 2009	Nov 20, 2009	Nov 19, 2009	Nov 20, 2009		XBO XE	
Legend of Kay Anniversary	Action-adventure, Platformer	Neon Studios	Nordic Games	Jun 28, 2015	Jun 28, 2015	Jun 28, 2015	Jun 28, 2015			
The Legend of Korra	Action & adventure	PlatinumGames	Activision	Oct 22, 2014	Unreleased	Unreleased	Unreleased	XBLA		
Legend of the Guardians: The Owls of Ga'Hoole	Combat flight simulation game	Krome Studios	Warner Bros. Interactive	Sep 14, 2010	Oct 8, 2010	Unreleased	Sep 29, 2010			
The Legend of Spyro: Dawn of the Dragon	Action	Étranges Libellules	Activision	Oct 22, 2008	Nov 21, 2008	Unreleased	Nov 5, 2008			
Legendary	First-person shooter	Spark Unlimited	Gamecock Media Group	Nov 4, 2008	Oct 24, 2008	Unreleased	Dec 4, 2008			
Legends of War	First-person shooter	Enigma Software Productions, Slitherine Strategies	Maximum Games	Nov 6, 2012	Mar 8, 2013	Unreleased	Unreleased			
Lego Batman 2: DC Super Heroes	Action-adventure, platformer	Traveller's Tales	Warner Bros. Interactive Entertainment	Jun 19, 2012	Jun 22, 2012	Unreleased	Jun 27, 2012		XBO	
Lego Batman 3: Beyond Gotham	Action-adventure, platformer	Traveller's Tales	Warner Bros. Interactive Entertainment	Nov 11, 2014	Nov 14, 2014	Unreleased	Nov 26, 2014			
Lego Batman: The Videogame	Action-adventure	Traveller's Tales	Warner Bros. Interactive Entertainment	Sep 23, 2008	Oct 10, 2008	Dec 18, 2008	Oct 15, 2008		XBO	
Lego Dimensions	Action-adventure, platformer	Traveller's Tales	Warner Bros. Interactive Entertainment	Sep 27, 2015	Sep 29, 2015	Unreleased	Sep 29, 2015			
Lego Harry Potter: Years 1–4	Action-adventure, platformer	Traveller's Tales	Warner Bros. Interactive Entertainment	Jun 29, 2010	Jun 25, 2010	Unreleased	Jun 30, 2010			
Lego Harry Potter: Years 5–7	Action-adventure, platformer	Traveller's Tales	Warner Bros. Interactive Entertainment	Nov 11, 2011	Nov 18, 2011	Unreleased	Nov 18, 2011			
Lego The Hobbit	Action-adventure, Action role-playing, platformer	Traveller's Tales	Warner Bros. Interactive Entertainment, MGM Interactive	Apr 8, 2014	Apr 11, 2014	Unreleased	Apr 17, 2014			
Lego Indiana Jones 2: The Adventure Continues	Action-adventure, platformer	Traveller's Tales	LucasArts	Nov 17, 2009	Nov 20, 2009	Unreleased	Nov 25, 2009		XBO	
Lego Indiana Jones: The Original Adventures	Action-adventure, platformer	Traveller's Tales	LucasArts	Jun 3, 2008	Jun 6, 2008	Dec 11, 2008	Jun 4, 2008		XBO	
Lego Jurassic World	Action-adventure, platformer	Traveller's Tales	Warner Bros. Interactive Entertainment	Jun 12, 2015	Jun 25, 2015	Unreleased	Jun 22, 2015			
Lego The Lord of the Rings	Action-adventure, Action role-playing, platformer	Traveller's Tales	Warner Bros. Interactive Entertainment	Oct 30, 2012	Nov 23, 2012	Unreleased	Nov 23, 2012		XBO	
Lego Marvel Super Heroes	Action-adventure, platformer	TT Games	Warner Bros. Interactive Entertainment	Oct 22, 2013	Nov 15, 2013	Unreleased	Nov 13, 2013			
Lego Marvel's Avengers	Action-adventure, platformer	TT Games	Warner Bros. Interactive Entertainment	Jan 26, 2016	Jan 29, 2016	Unreleased	Jan 27, 2016			
The Lego Movie Videogame	Action-adventure, Platformer	TT Games	Warner Bros. Interactive Entertainment	Feb 7, 2014	Feb 14, 2014	Nov 6, 2014	Apr 3, 2014			
Lego Pirates of the Caribbean: The Video Game	Action-adventure, platformer	Traveller's Tales	Disney Interactive Studios	May 10, 2011	May 13, 2011	Unreleased	May 19, 2011		XBO	
Lego Rock Band	Music	Harmonix Music Systems, Traveller's Tales	Warner Bros. Interactive Entertainment, MTV Games	Nov 3, 2009	Nov 27, 2009	Unreleased	Nov 25, 2009			
Lego Star Wars: The Complete Saga	Action-adventure, platformer	Traveller's Tales	LucasArts	Nov 6, 2007	Nov 9, 2007	Unreleased	Nov 7, 2007		XBO	
Lego Star Wars: The Force Awakens	Action-adventure, platformer	Traveller's Tales	Warner Bros. Interactive Entertainment	Jun 28, 2016	Jun 28, 2016	Unreleased	Jun 28, 2016			
Lego Star Wars II: The Original Trilogy	Action-adventure, platformer	Traveller's Tales	LucasArts	Sep 12, 2006	Sep 28, 2006	Unreleased	Sep 15, 2006		XBO	
Lego Star Wars III: The Clone Wars	Action-adventure, platformer	Traveller's Tales	LucasArts	Mar 15, 2011	Mar 18, 2011	Unreleased	Mar 30, 2011		XBO	
Leisure Suit Larry: Box Office Bust	Adventure	Team17	Sierra Entertainment	Mar 31, 2009	Mar 27, 2009	Unreleased	Apr 30, 2009			
Let's Cheer		Cat Daddy Games	2K Play	Nov 7, 2011	Nov 25, 2011	Nov 25, 2011	Unreleased	K		
Let's Dance with Mel B		Lightning Fish	Black Bean Games	Apr 24, 2012	Jun 24, 2011	Unreleased	Unreleased	K		
Let's Sing and Dance	Music	Voxler Games	Deep Silver	Oct 9, 2013	Unreleased	Unreleased	Unreleased	K XBLA		
Life Is Strange	Action & adventure	Dontnod Entertainment	Square Enix	Oct 20, 2015	Oct 20, 2015	Unreleased	Oct 20, 2015	XBLA		
Lightning Returns: Final Fantasy XIII	Role-playing	Square Enix	Square Enix	Feb 11, 2014	Feb 14, 2014	Nov 21, 2013	Feb 13, 2014		XBO XE	
Limbo	Puzzle & trivia	Playdead	Microsoft Game Studios	Jul 21, 2010	Unreleased	Unreleased	Unreleased	XBLA	XBO	
Lips	Music	iNiS	Microsoft Game Studios	Nov 18, 2008	Nov 21, 2008	Unreleased	Nov 27, 2008			
Lips: Canta en Español	Music	iNiS	Microsoft Studios	Unreleased	Nov 13, 2009	Unreleased	Unreleased			
Lips: I Love the 80's	Music	iNiS	Microsoft Studios	Unreleased	Apr 2, 2010	Unreleased	Apr 2, 2010			
Lips: Number One Hits	Music	iNiS	Microsoft Game Studios	Oct 20, 2009	Oct 23, 2009	Unreleased	Nov 26, 2009			
Lips: Party Classics	Music	iNiS	Microsoft Game Studios	Mar 4, 2010	Feb 26, 2010	Unreleased	Mar 18, 2010			
Lips: Deutsche Partyknaller	Music	iNiS	Microsoft Studios	Unreleased	Nov 22, 2013	Unreleased	Unreleased			
Little League World Series Baseball 2010	Sports	Now Production	Activision	Jul 13, 2010	Jul 13, 2010	Unreleased	Jul 13, 2010			
LMA Manager 2007	Sports management	Codemasters	Codemasters	Unreleased	Sep 22, 2006	Unreleased	Oct 13, 2006			
LocoCycle	Racing & flying	Twisted Pixel Games	Microsoft Studios	Feb 14, 2014	Unreleased	Unreleased	Unreleased	XBLA		
Lode Runner	Classics	Southend Interactive/ Tozai Games	Microsoft Game Studios	Apr 22, 2009	Unreleased	Unreleased	Unreleased	XBLA	XBO	
Lollipop Chainsaw	Hack and slash	Grasshopper Manufacture	Warner Bros. Interactive Entertainment	Jun 12, 2012	Jun 15, 2012	Jun 14, 2012	Jun 13, 2012			
London 2012: The Official Video Game	Sports, (Olympic)	Sega Studios Australia	Sega	Jun 26, 2012	Jun 28, 2012	Unreleased	Jun 28, 2012	3D K		
Looney Tunes: Acme Arsenal	Action-adventure	Redtribe	Warner Bros. Interactive Entertainment	Oct 9, 2007	Nov 30, 2007	Unreleased	Feb 6, 2008			
The Lord of the Rings: Conquest	Action	Pandemic Studios	Electronic Arts	Jan 13, 2009	Jan 9, 2009	Unreleased	Jan 9, 2009			
The Lord of the Rings: The Battle for Middle-earth II	RTS	EA Los Angeles	Electronic Arts	Jul 5, 2006	Jul 14, 2006	Unreleased	Jul 14, 2006			
The Lord of the Rings: War in the North	RPG	Snowblind Studios	Warner Bros. Interactive Entertainment	Nov 1, 2011	Nov 9, 2011	Unreleased	Nov 9, 2011			
Lost Cities	Card & board	Sierra Entertainment	Sierra Entertainment	Apr 23, 2008	Unreleased	Unreleased	Unreleased	XBLA		
Lost Odyssey	Role-playing	Mistwalker	Microsoft Game Studios	Feb 12, 2008	Feb 29, 2008	Dec 6, 2007	Feb 8, 2008		XBO	
Lost Planet 2	Third-person shooter	Capcom	Capcom	May 18, 2010	May 11, 2010	May 20, 2010	May 13, 2010		XBO	
Lost Planet 3	Third-person shooter	Spark Unlimited	Capcom	Aug 27, 2013	Aug 30, 2013	Aug 29, 2013	Aug 29, 2013		XBO	
Lost Planet: Extreme Condition	Third-person shooter	Capcom	Capcom	Jan 12, 2007	Jan 12, 2007	Dec 21, 2006	Jan 12, 2007		XBO	
Lost: Via Domus	Action-adventure	Ubisoft Montreal	Ubisoft	Feb 26, 2008	Feb 28, 2008	Unreleased	Feb 29, 2008			
Love Football	Sports	Namco Bandai Games	Namco Bandai Games	Unreleased	Unreleased	May 18, 2006	Unreleased			
Love Tore: Bitter (a.k.a. ラブ*トレ/ Love*Tra)	Visual novel	Boost On	Boost On	Unreleased	Unreleased	Jan 31, 2013	Unreleased	K		
Love Tore: Chocolate (Love Tore Trilogy Set) (a.k.a. ラブ*トレ/ Love*Tra)	Visual novel	Boost On	Boost On	Unreleased	Unreleased	Mar 28, 2013	Unreleased	K		
Love Tore: Mint (a.k.a. ラブ*トレ/ Love*Tra)	Visual novel	Boost On	Boost On	Unreleased	Unreleased	Nov 29, 2012	Unreleased	K		
Love Tore: Sweet (a.k.a. ラブ*トレ/ Love*Tra)	Visual novel	Boost On	Boost On	Unreleased	Unreleased	Sep 27, 2012	Unreleased	K		
Lucha Fury	Fighting	Punchers Impact	Coktel	Jun 22, 2011	Unreleased	Unreleased	Unreleased	XBLA		
Lucha Libre AAA 2010: Héroes del Ring	Sports	Immersion Software	Sabarasa Studios	Oct 12, 2010	Unreleased	Unreleased	Unreleased			
Lucidity	Action & adventure	LucasArts	Disney Interactive Studios	Oct 7, 2009	Unreleased	Unreleased	Unreleased	XBLA		
Lumines Live!	Puzzle & trivia	Q Entertainment	Microsoft Game Studios	Oct 18, 2006	Unreleased	Unreleased	Unreleased	XBLA	XBO	
Luxor 2	Puzzle & trivia	MumboJumbo	Microsoft Game Studios	Apr 4, 2007	Unreleased	Unreleased	Unreleased	XBLA	XBO	

== Cancelled games ==
K Kinect optional K required	DL Downloadable Titles	XBLA Xbox Live Arcade Titles

Title	Genre(s)	Developer(s)	Publisher(s)	Addons	Ref.
50 Cent: Bulletproof	Action	Genuine Games	Vivendi Universal Games		
Disney Channel All Star Party	Party	Page 44 Studios	Disney Interactive Studios	K	
Disney Princess: My Fairytale Adventure	Multiplayer	High Impact Games	Disney Interactive Studios		
Dream Pinball 3D II	Pinball simulator	ASK Homework	TopWare Interactive		

== See also ==
- List of best-selling Xbox 360 video games
- List of Xbox 360 System Link games
- List of Xbox games compatible with Xbox 360
- List of Xbox games on Windows Phone
