= Monument to Viriathus (Zamora) =

Statue in Zamora, Spain

Viriato
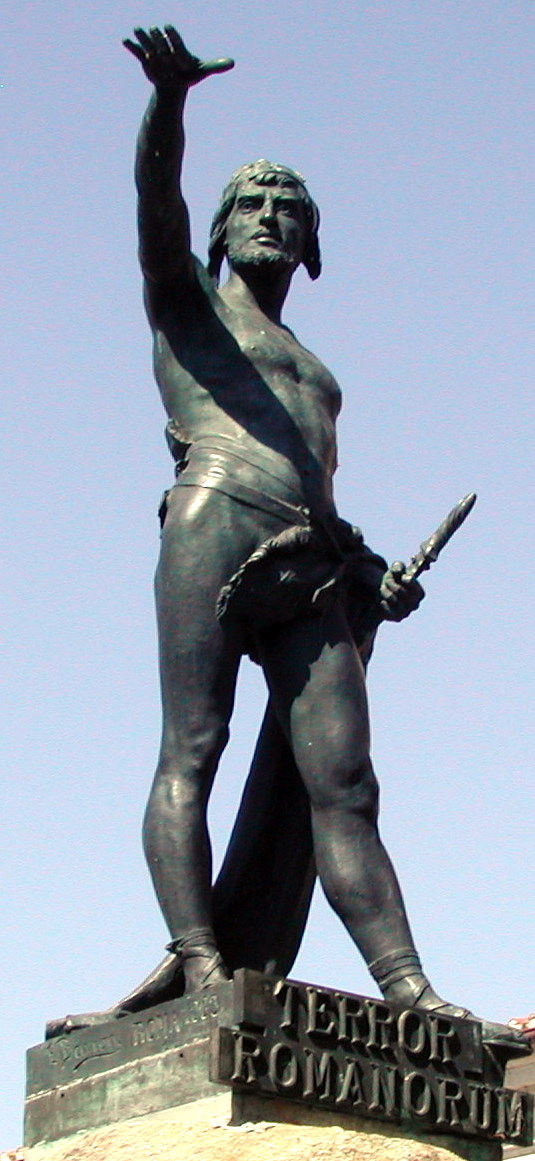
- Location: Plaza de Viriato, Zamora, Spain
- Coordinates: 41.502494°N 5.748472°W
- Designer: Eduardo Barrón
- Material: Bronze, granite
- Height: 2 m (statue)
- Opening date: 12 January 1904
- Dedicated to: Viriathus

Viriato or the Monument to Viriathus, is an example of public art in Zamora, Spain. It was dedicated to Viriathus and is located in the eponymous plaza. The monument consists of a bronze sculpture of the Lusitanian chieftain-shepherd put on an unpolished stone pedestal that features a battering ram.

== History and description ==
The statue was the work of Eduardo Barrón. It is cast in bronze and was discovered in Rome at Nelli's foundry in 1883, it was later bought by the Spanish State.

The leading statue of the sculptural ensemble represents a standing and almost naked full-body figure of Viriathus, with his right arm extended in attitude of rallying his troops, while the left forearm holds a tunic and the left hand grabs a sheathed sword below the level of an abnormally long handle (creating a phallic perception from certain angles).

The statue stands 2-metre high and its bronze base reads terror romanorum ("terror of the Romans"), an epithet for Viriathus attributed to the Orosius' chronicles. The statue and the quadrangular base stand on a granite pedestal taken from Torrefrades, one of the pretenders claimed to be the Viriatho's birthplace. The granite block features a battering ram emerging from its front side, cast in bronze in 1903.

Failing to undergo a proper ceremony of inauguration, the monument was casually unveiled by transients on 12 January 1904.

The monument, with Viriathus' posture identified as performing a Roman (fascist) salute, was embraced by the Falange as an icon during the Francoist dictatorship.

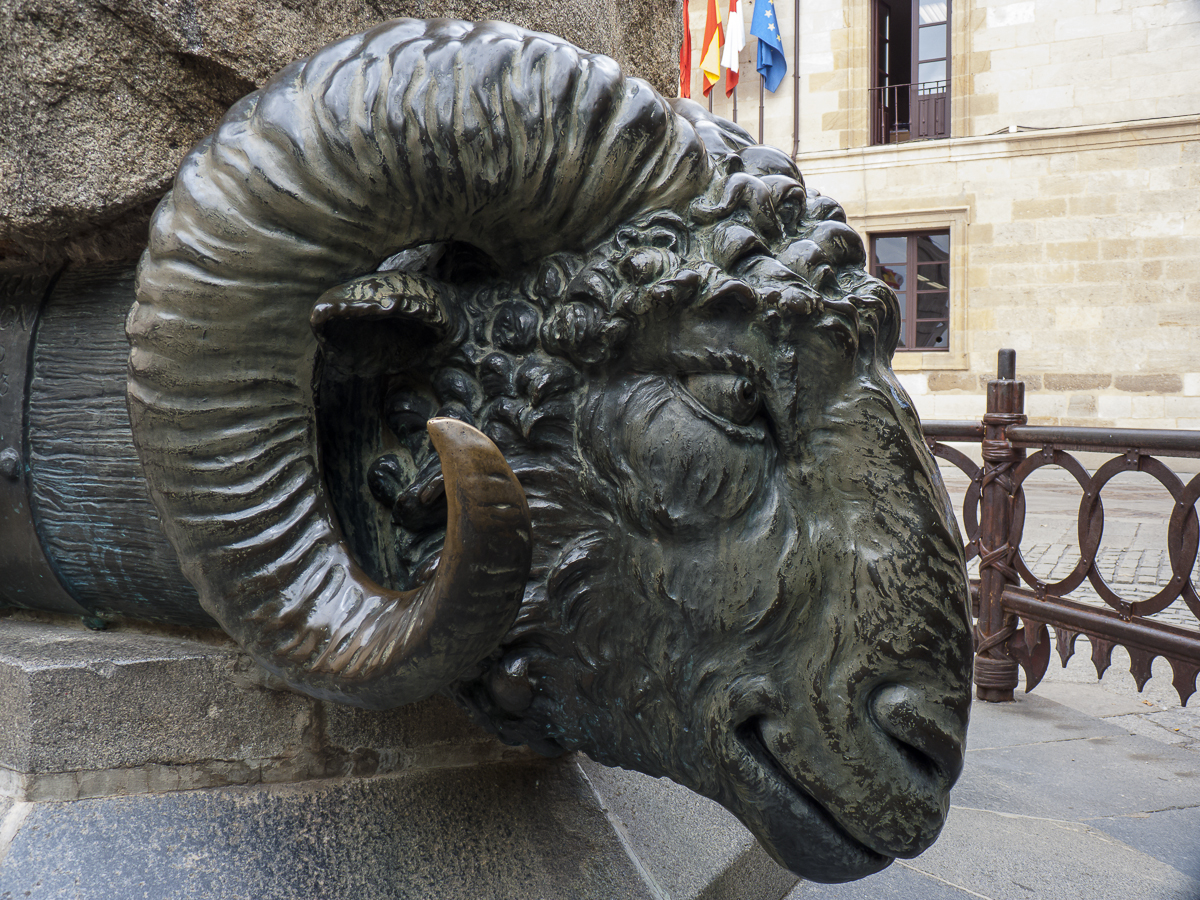
Detail of the head of the battering ram

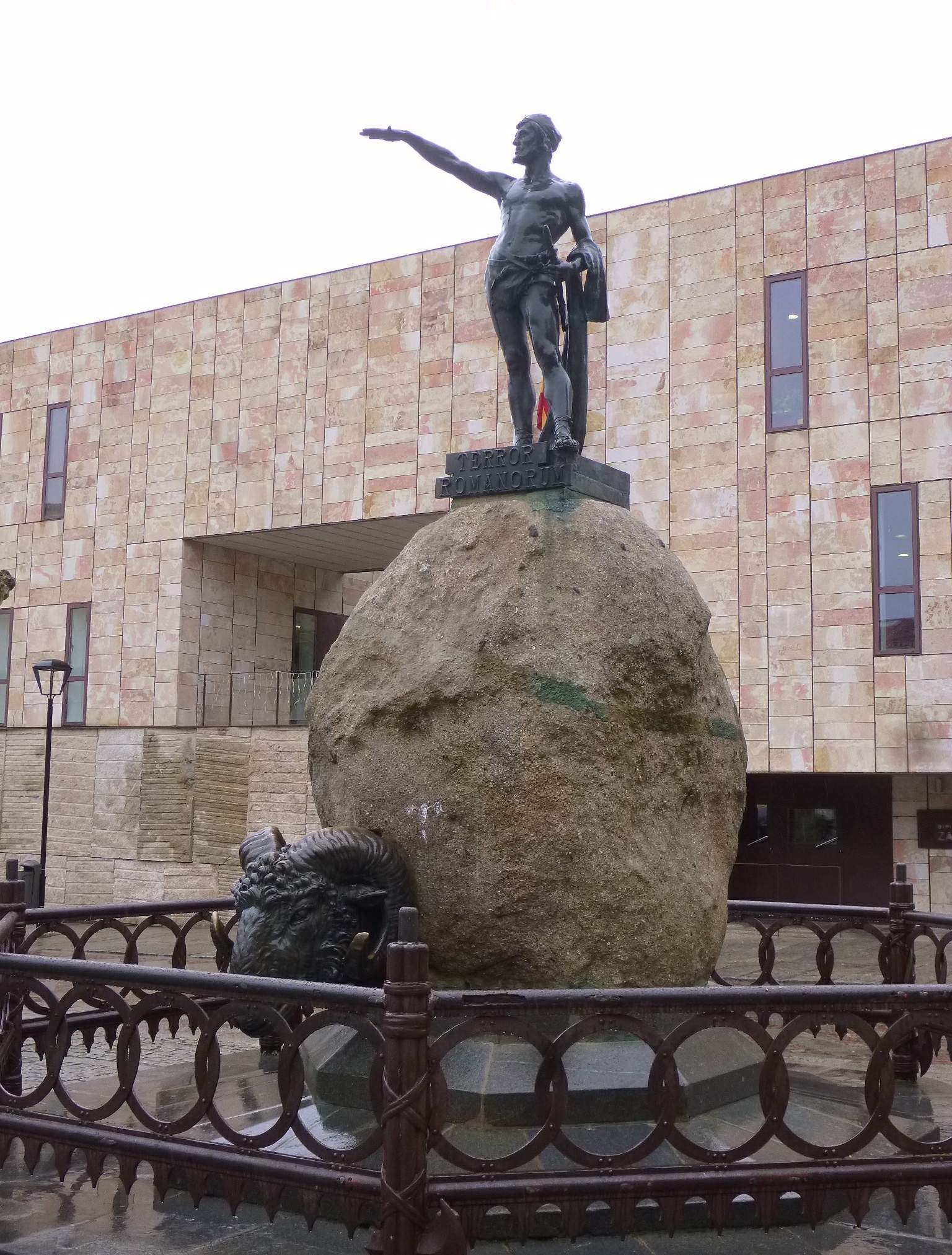
