= Roberto Freire =

Roberto Freire may refer to:

- Roberto Freire (politician) (born 1942), Brazilian politician
- Roberto Freire (psychiatrist) (1927–2008), Brazilian psychiatrist

== See also ==
- Freire
