= Freire =

Freire / Freyre is a word used in the Portuguese and Galician languages to define the occupational name for a friar or a nickname for a pious person or someone employed at a monastery.

The word is derived from Latin frater, which means brother. Not Jewish in origin but some Sephardic Jews adopted this name.

== History ==
In the eleventh century religious associations of horsemen were founded, called the Military Orders, whose members, in the language of the Church, were collectively called fratres, and each frater. This word entered the everyday language which meant fraternized Knight by the Military Orders, and, as circumstances of time and place, the Portuguese territory had evolved phonetically similar forms of the form "Frei" hence the name Freire of these knights, and how "Brother" was used as a prepositional name to qualify the proper name of the Knights. Among the knights who came from France, accompanied D. Raymond and D. Henry, who were the soldiers' "Freire, the family of former Galicia, which joined the Andrade, almost at the beginning, joining later for new wedlock so many times that is difficult to distinguish one from the other. These unions created one family, that of Freire de Andrade, who came to Portugal in the Middle Ages. Some use both names together, others only to Andrade or just Freire, and this, as it were the weapons were a (Coat of nobility) with the band, open mouthed serpent heads.

The Kingdom of León, a region which today corresponds to the extreme northern Spain, was divided into duchies, including the Duchy of Portu-Callis and the Duchy of Galicia.

Two French noblemen, D. Raymond, son of Count Henry of Burgundy and his cousin, offered to Alfonso VI, King of Leon to fight in the war against the Moors, perhaps in return for services rendered by war Afonso VI married his legitimate daughter, Urraca with Raymond and his illegitimate daughter, Dona Teresa to Henry. Raymond received the government of Galicia and Henry Duchy of Portu-Callis.

Portu-Callis was to become in 1143 the Kingdom of Portugal ruled by Henry (The conqueror), recognised by the Kingdom of Castile and the Kingdom of León through the Treaty of Zamora in 1143. In 1179 Pope Alexander III recognized Portugal as an independent nation and vassal of the church through the bull Manifestis Probatum.

Order of Avis - the creation date of this Order is unknown, but, like their counterparts, will have started by an association of riders in order to fight the Muslims, by mid-twelfth century. During the reign of Afonso Henriques (Henry) there was a military order with the name Freire of Évora, integrated into the Order of Calatrava of Castile, the king donated of several castles exposed to the attacks of the Moors. In 1211, D. Afonso II donated to these Freires the place of Avis which later came to be established as the order of Avis. In the initiation ritual they professed the following oath: "I come before God and before the Freires" ... Implying that this magic initiation ritual, occurred in the Castillo de Los Templar (this castle that belonged to the Order of Freires) in the town of Ponferrada in Galicia.

The Andrades took advantage of this family's prestige and titles using the Freire coat of arms since the Andrades did not belong to any order of chivalry. In turn the Freires tapped into a new source of wealth, it was a mutually beneficial alliance. Members of the Freire family gave rise powerful noblemen in Portugal during the time of the reconquista. King Pedro I entrusted his son John who later became D. João I (John I) King of Portugal, to Don Nuno Freire de Andrade the master of the Order of Christ, which was the converted Order of the Temple by King Pedro's father, King Dinis I of Portugal, since the Templars had been made extinct by a papal bull in 1318. Although an exception was made for the Templars' holdings in the Kingdoms of Aragon, Castile, Portugal and Mallorca, in other kingdoms throughout Europe such as France and England the Templar's property was transferred to the Hospitallers. In the event, the three kings principally concerned, Edward II, James II of Aragon and above all Philip IV of France, publicly agreed to the Pope's plans for the Temple's riches, but all ensured that a portion remained in their own hands and or the hands of their vassals. In the case of Portugal with King Dinis I this was no different although in this case the Templars were merely converted to the Order of Christ in 1318, some of the vassals to gain recognition with this were precisely the Freires. Again in this case there was an exception regarding the other kingdoms since they were already part of the Templars and the Hospitallers.

The Freire family continued to have an important part in the Order of Christ until the beginning of the 20th century in Portugal until this country became a Republic. The Freires endured for 700 years with close ties to the Portuguese and European nobility such as the Austrians, French and Germans.

The Freire coat of arms is recognised as being one of the oldest unchanged European coats of arms. It is also used under the name Freire de Andrade, although the arms belong to the Freire.

== People with the name ==
- Alejandro Freire (born 1974), Venezuelan baseball player
- Andrés Freire (born 1972), Argentine entrepreneur
- Bernardino Freire (1759–1809), Portuguese army general officer
- Carlos do Amaral Freire, Brazilian scholar and linguist
- Cecilia Freire (born 1981), Spanish actress
- Daniel Freire (born 1961), Argentine film actor
- Federico Freire (born 1990), Argentine footballer
- Francisco José Freire (1719–1773), Portuguese historian and philologist
- José Freire Falcão (born 1925), Brazilian cardinal of the Catholic Church
- Laura Espido Freire (born 1974), Spanish writer
- Juliette Freire (born 1989), Brazilian media personality, lawyer, makeup artist, digital influencer, television presenter, and singer
- Junqueira Freire (1832–1855), Brazilian poet and Benedictine monk
- Justa Freire (1896–1965), Spanish educator
- Manuel Freire (born 1942), Portuguese singer and composer
- Manuel Alberto Freire Andrade Armijo (c. 1765 – c. 1834), Spanish cavalry officer and general
- Nelson Freire (1944–2021), Brazilian classical pianist
- Nicolás Freire (born 1994), Argentine footballer
- Óscar Freire (born 1976), Spanish bicycle racer
- Paulo Freire (1921–1997), Brazilian educator
- Ramón Freire (1787–1851), President of Chile
- Roberto Freire (politician) (born 1942), Brazilian politician
- Roberto Freire (psychiatrist) (1927–2008), Brazilian psychiatrist and writer
- Willamy Freire (born 1987), Brazilian mixed martial arts fighter

== See also ==
- Freire Muniz River, a river of Espírito Santo state in eastern Brazil
- Freire's Sooty Barbthroat, a hummingbird sub-species in the family Trochilidae
- Freire (horse), a Chilean racehorse
