= Monument to Columbus (Salamanca) =

Monument in Salamanca, Spain

- Monumento a Colón
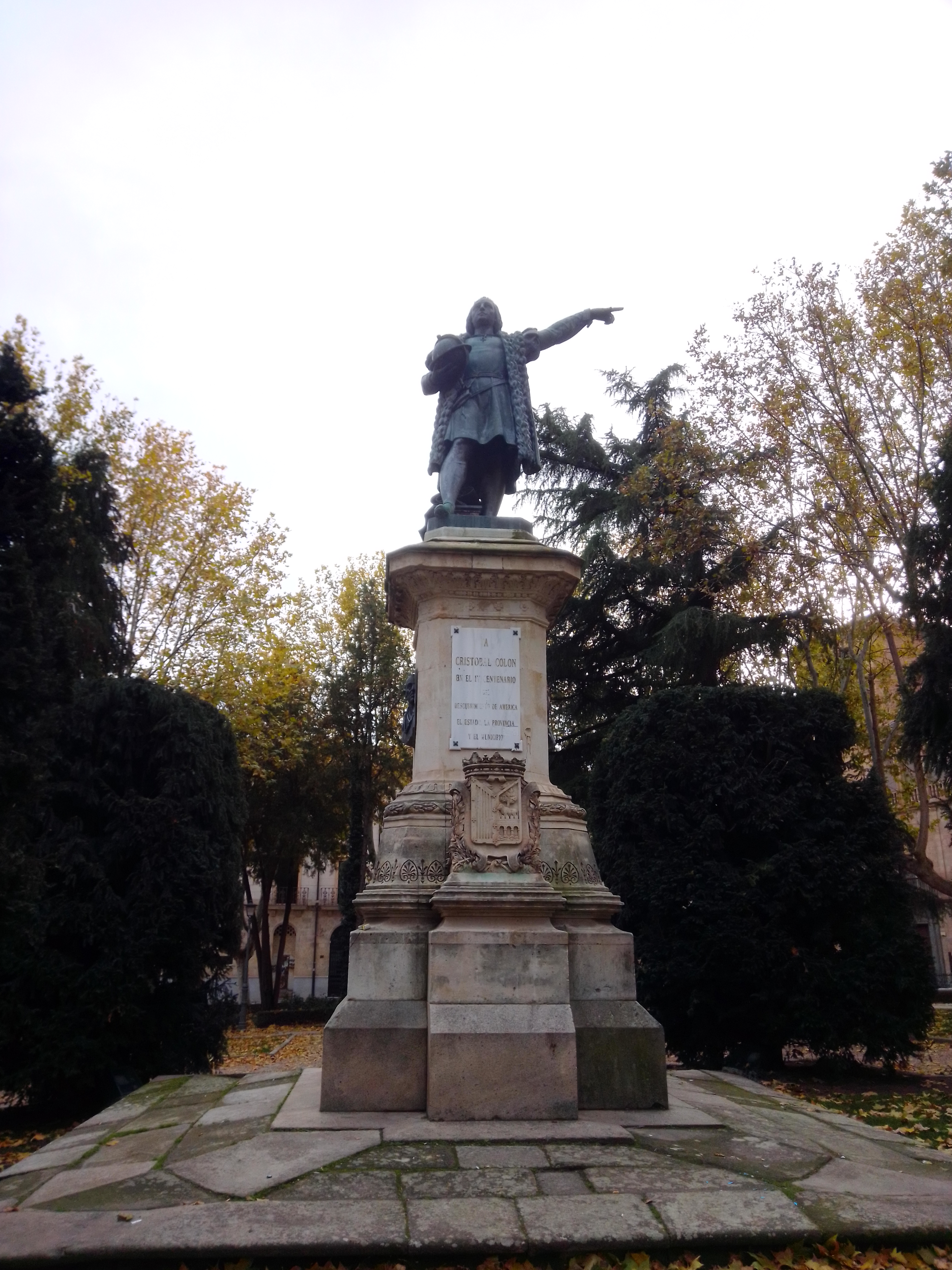
- Interactive map of Monument to Columbus
- Location: Plaza de Colón, Salamanca, Spain
- Coordinates: 40.962406°N 5.663876°W
- Designer: Eduardo Barrón
- Material: Bronze, stone
- Height: 3.30 m (statue)
- Opening date: 9 September 1893
- Dedicated to: Christopher Columbus

The Monument to Columbus (Spanish: Monumento a Colón) is an instance of public art in Salamanca, Spain. The monument, dedicated to Christopher Columbus, is erected on the centre of the namesake plaza.

== History and description ==
The idea for the erection of the monument was part of the series of initiatives in Spain intending to commemorate the 400th anniversary of the arrival of Columbus to the Americas. A work by Eduardo Barrón and standing 3.30 metre high, the statue representing Columbus was cast in bronze. The location chosen for the monument was the Plaza de los Menores, that from then on, it became known as "plaza de Colón". Building works started in 1892.

The frontside of the stone pedestal features the coat of arms of Salamanca, and an inscription reading a cristóbal colón en el iv centenario del descubrimiento de américa. el estado, la provincia y el municipio ("to Christopher Columbus in the 400th anniversary of the Discovery of the Americas. The State, the province and the municipality"), while the lateral sides incorporate two reliefs depicting the busts of Diego de Deza and Isabella of Castile.

It was unveiled on 9 September 1893.

== In popular culture ==
The finger-pointing statue helped to create a folkloric ditty: ¿Hacia dónde apunta Colón? A la calle de Pan y Carbón ("Where is Columbus pointing? To the Street of Bread and Coal").

== See also ==
- List of monuments and memorials to Christopher Columbus
