= Eduardo Barrón González =

Spanish sculptor (1858–1911)

Eduardo Barrón
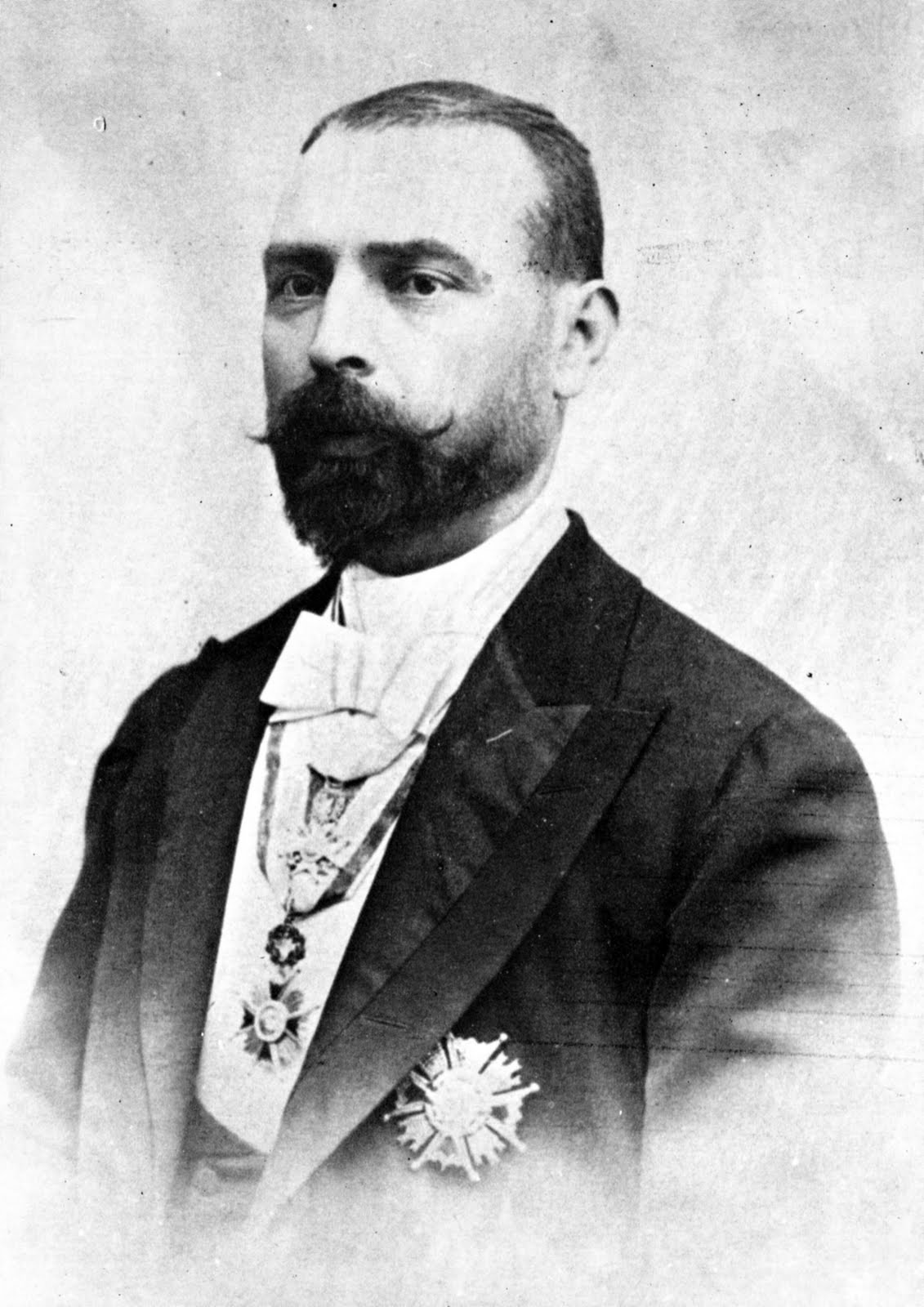
- Barrón circa 1898
- Born: 2 April 1858; Moraleja del Vino
- Died: 23 November 1911 (aged 53); Madrid
- Occupation: Sculptor, conservator-restorer
- Awards: Knight Grand Officer of the Order of Isabella the Catholic (1894)

Signature
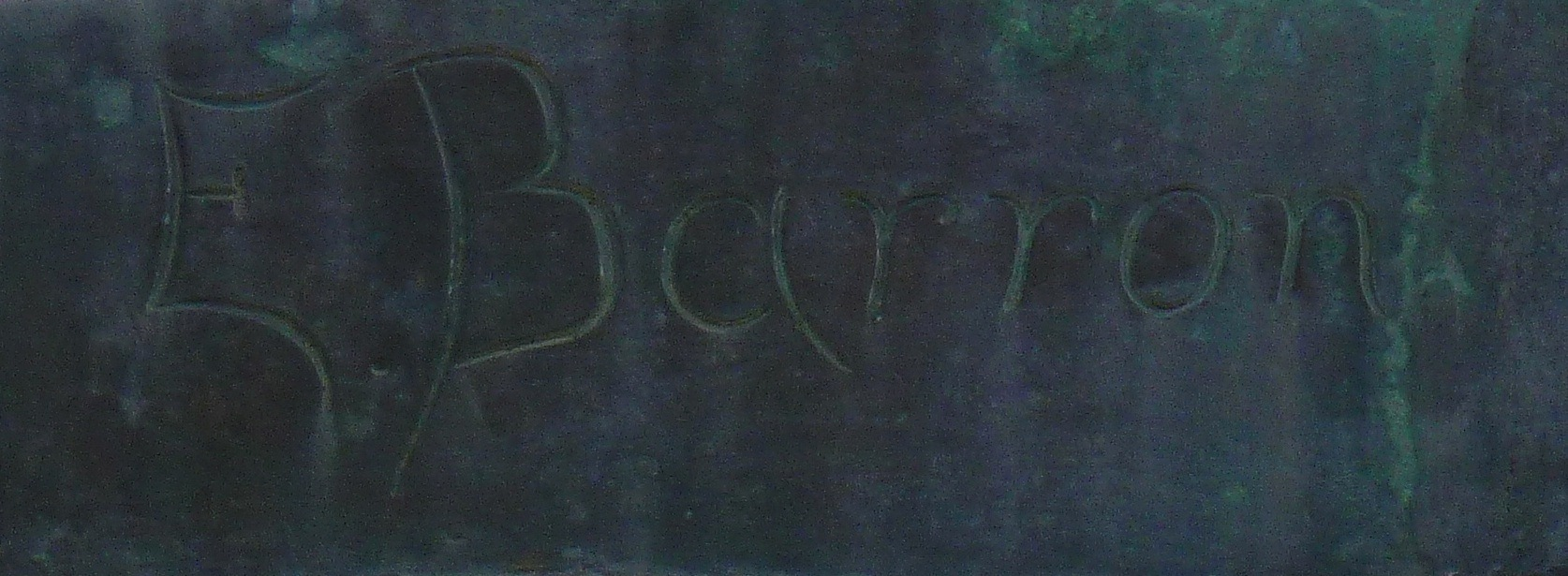

Eduardo Barrón González (2 April 1858 – 23 November 1911) was a Spanish sculptor.

Born in Moraleja del Vino, in the province of Zamora, he frequented the Instituto Provincial (of Zamora). He was granted a scholarship to study at the School of Paint, Sculpture and Engraving in Madrid in 1877. He moved to Rome to continue honing his skills in 1881. Following a brief interlude in Madrid, he returned to Rome for another spell in 1884, before his definitive instalment in Madrid in 1889.

Appointed to a post as conservator-restorer at the Prado Museum in 1895, he took office as numerary member of the Real Academia de Bellas Artes de San Fernando in the Section of Sculpture on 11 December 1910, taking the seat vacated by Elías Martín.

He died in Madrid on 23 November 1911.

== Works ==
- Viriato, Zamora.
- Cristóbal Colón, Salamanca.
- Hernán Cortés, Medellín.
- Nerón y Séneca, Córdoba.
- Emilio Castelar, Cádiz.
- Adán después del pecado, Zamora.

== Gallery ==
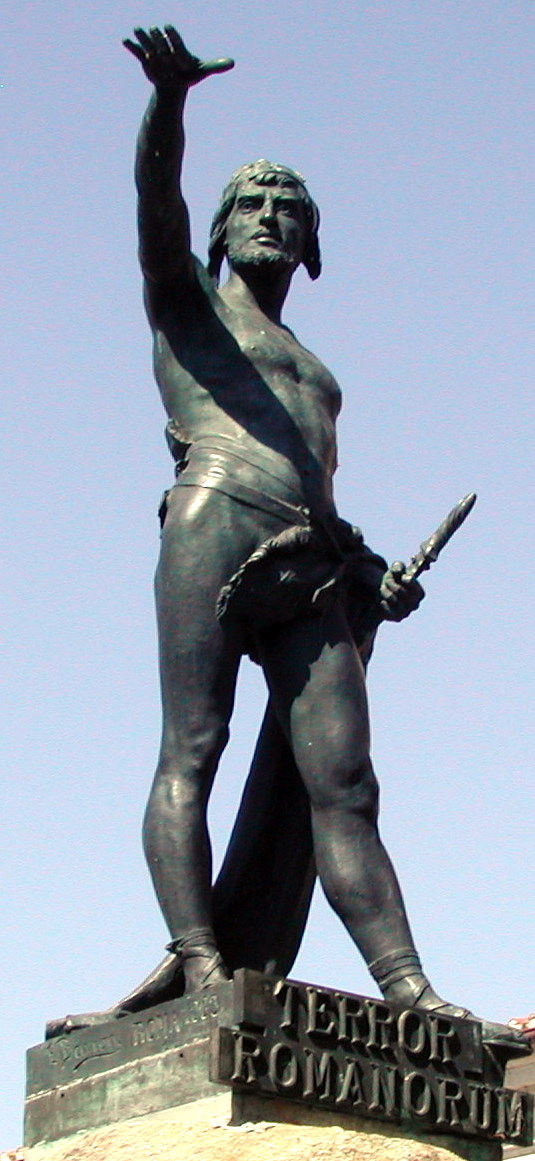
Monument to Viriathus, Zamora

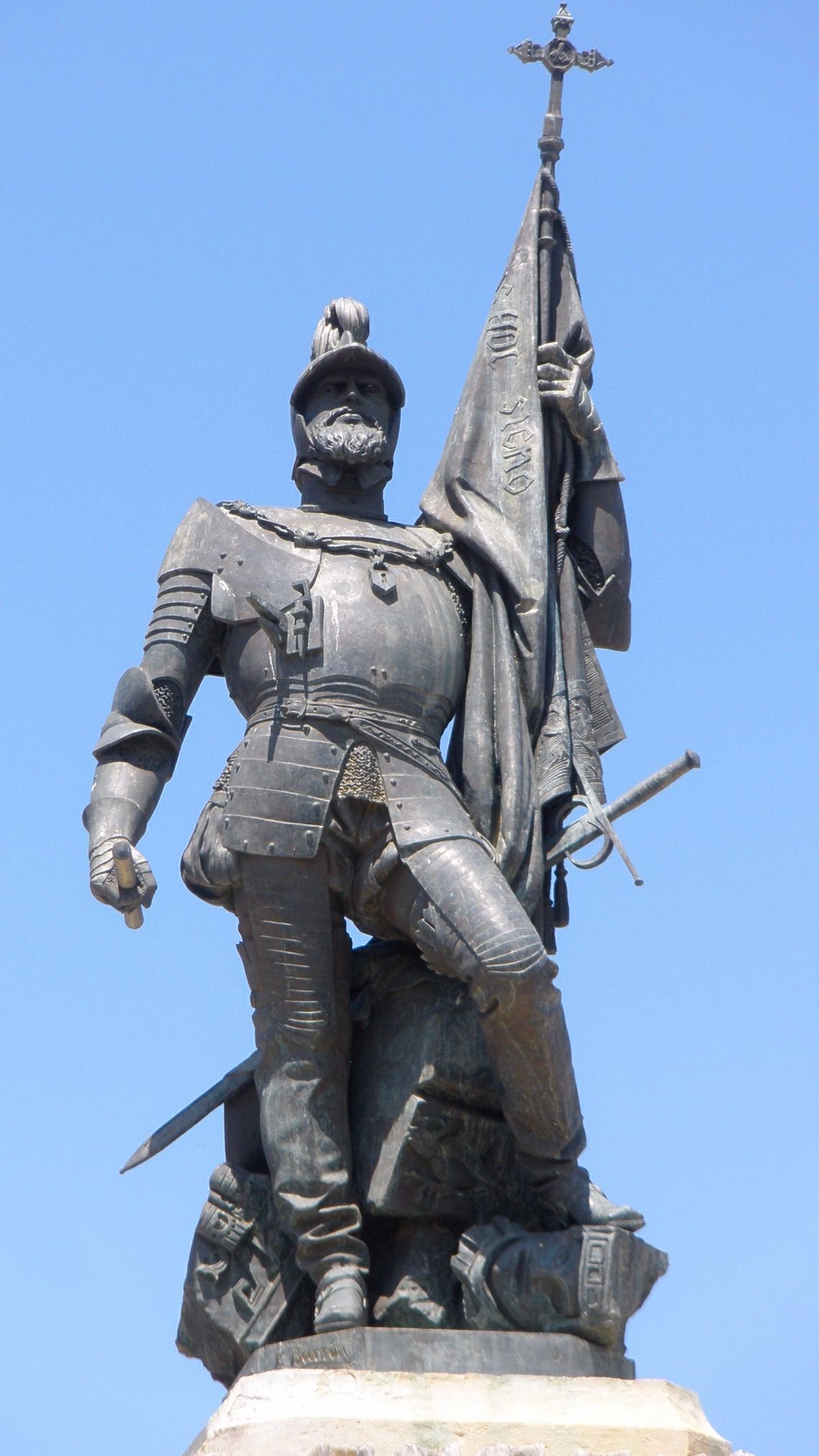
Monument to Hernán Cortés, Medellín

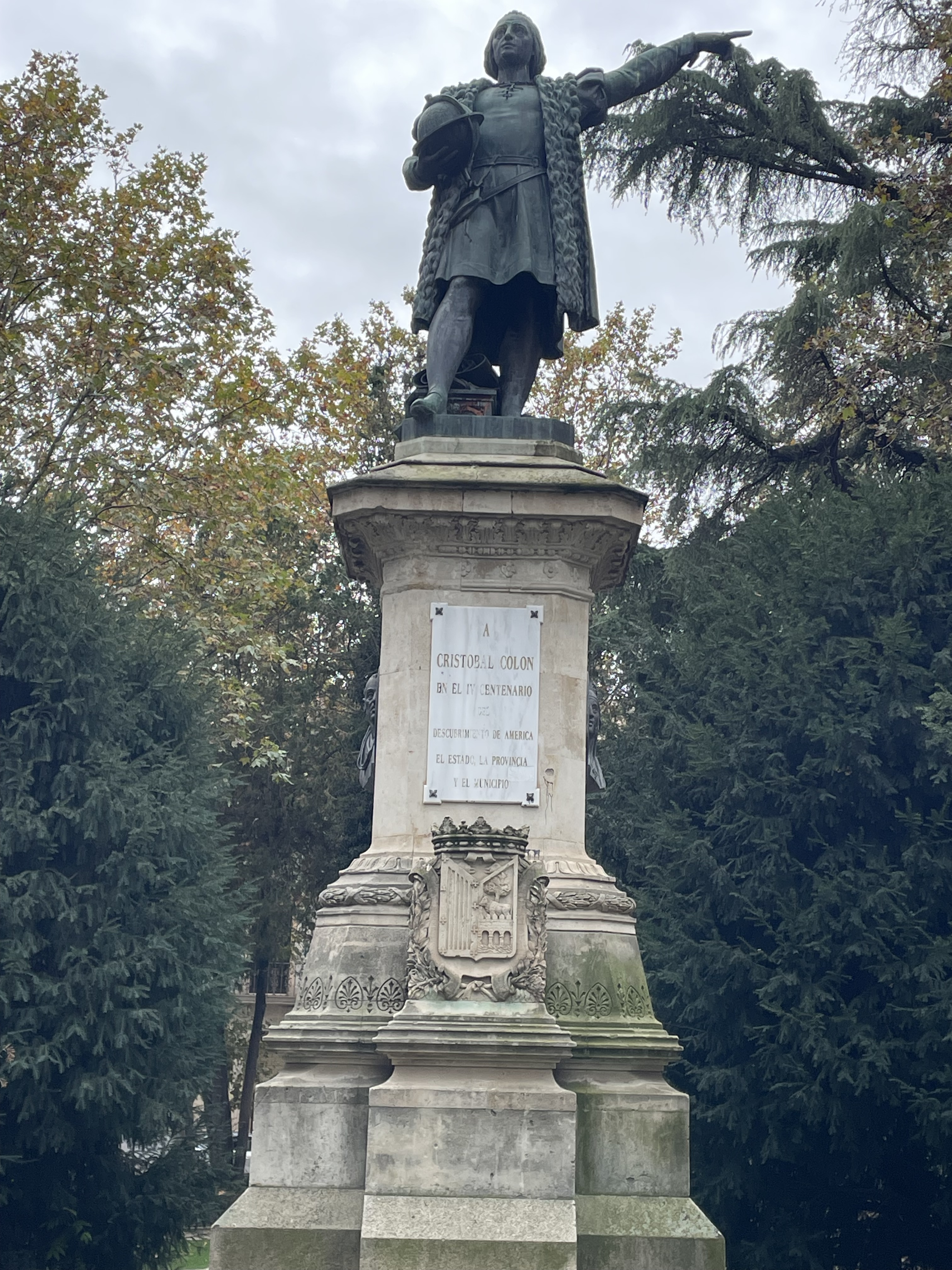
Monument to Columbus, Salamanca

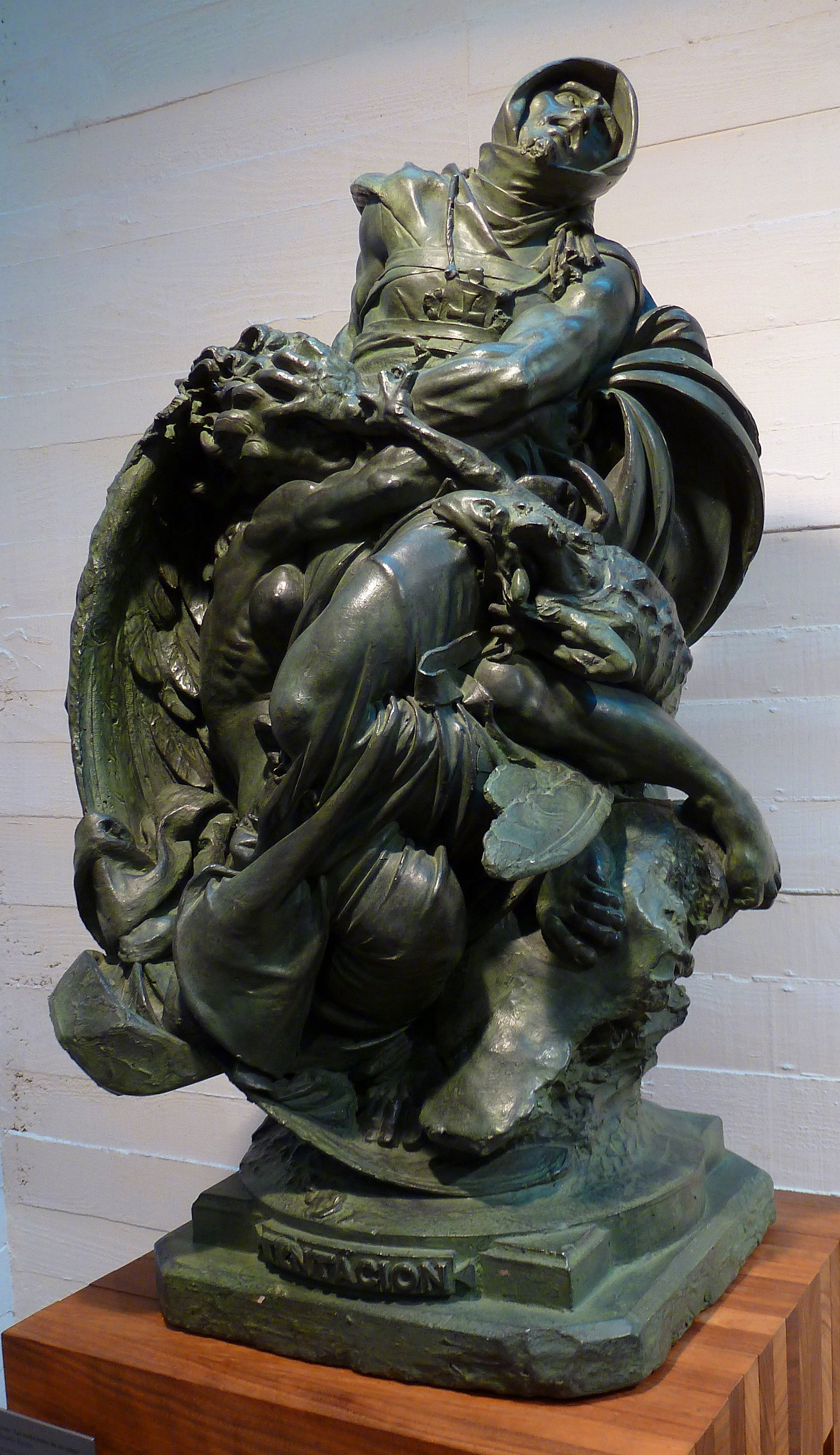
Tentación (sketch), Museo de Zamora

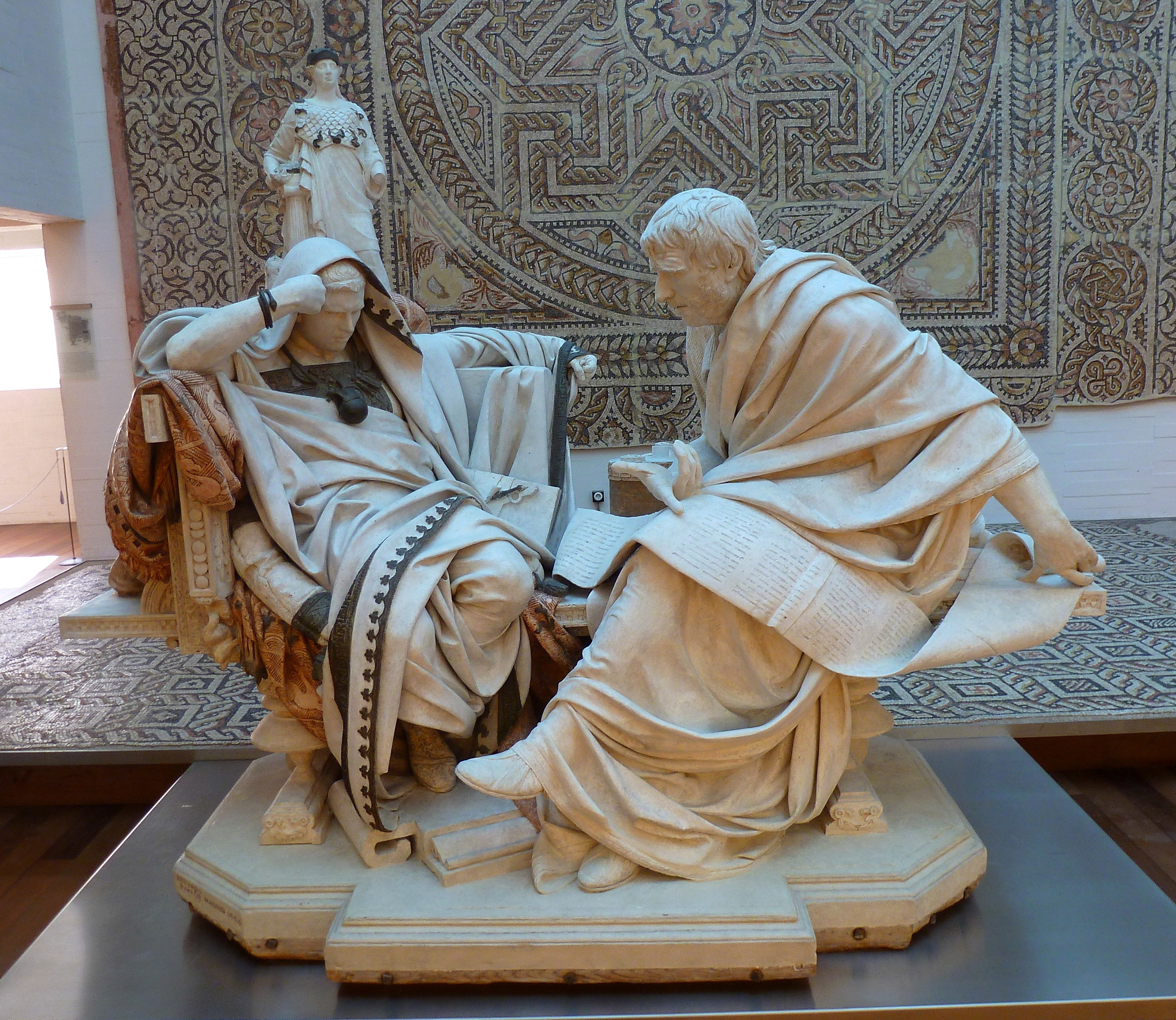
Nero and Seneca, Museo del Prado (deposited in the Museo de Zamora)

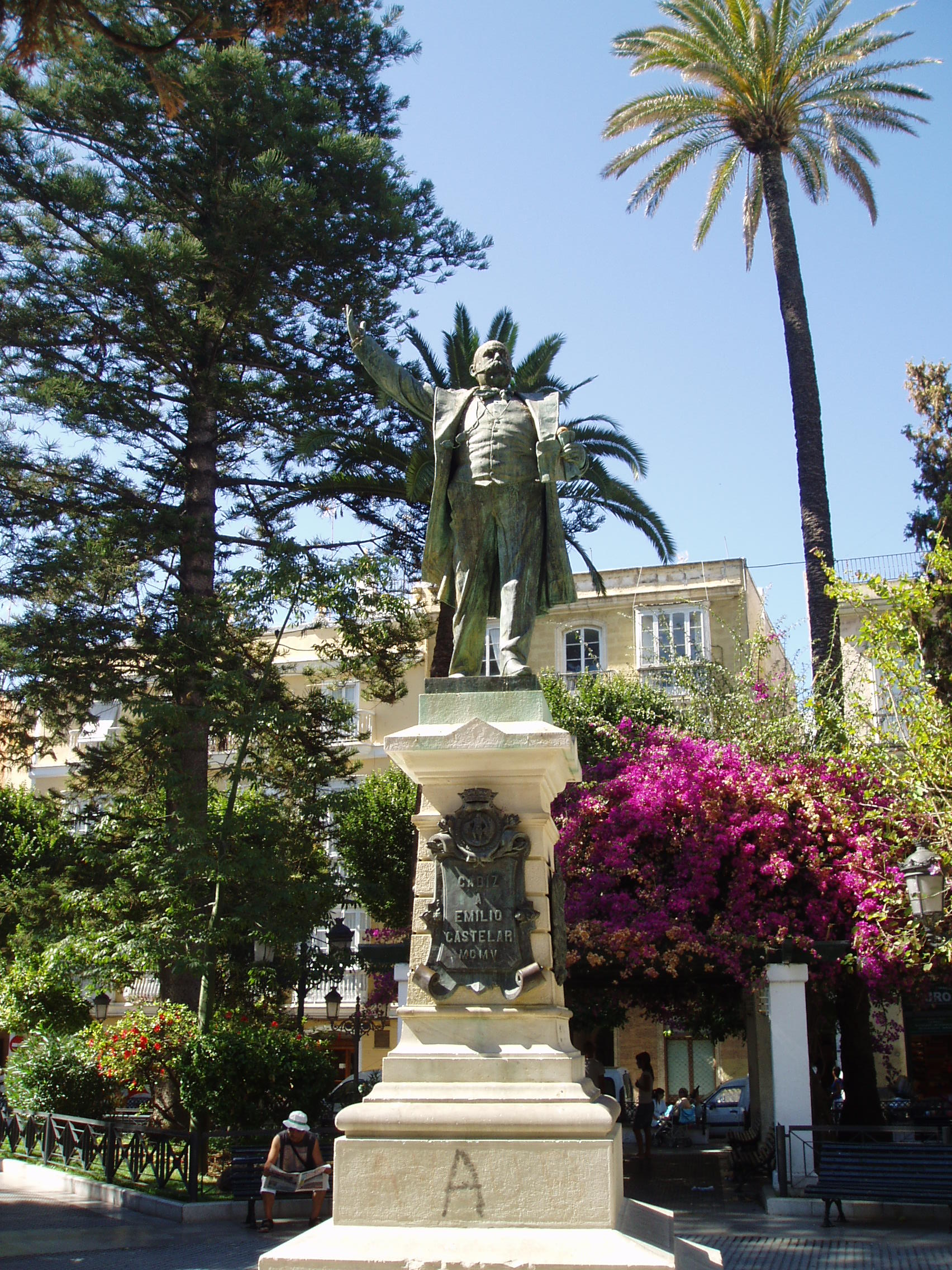
Monument to Emilio Castelar, Cadiz

Academic offices
Preceded by Elías Martín y Riesco	Member of the Real Academia de Bellas Artes de San Fernando (Section of Sculpture); 11 December 1910 – 23 November 1911	Succeeded by Miguel Ángel Trilles Serrano
