= Alot (store) =

Staples Argentina
- Type: Subsidiary
- Industry: Office supplies
- Founded: 1997
- Headquarters: Buenos Aires, Argentina, South America
- Number of locations: 4 stores, 4 warehouses (2014)
- Key people: Santiago Bilinkis (Founder); Andrés Freire (Founder)
- Owner: Staples Inc.
- Number of employees: 170 (2011)
- Website: www.staples.com.ar

Alot, formerly known as Staples Argentina, is the subsidiary of the American office supply chain Staples in Argentina and Brazil. The company is headquartered in Buenos Aires. Staples Argentina is the largest office supply company in Argentina and one of the top three in Brazil.

The company gained international recognition after Harvard Business School Professor Walter Kuemmerle wrote two cases for the International Entrepreneurship course.

== History ==
Officenet was founded in 1997 by Andy Freire and Santiago Bilinkis. Seed capital was provided by four angel investors from Argentina. The next year, Officenet was selected as an Endeavor Entrepreneur.

For a short period in 1999 and 2000, Officenet was a part of Submarino, Inc. Submarino started acquisition of Officenet in 1999, and the merger was finished on February 29, 2000. With the help of Submarino, Officenet expanded into Brazil that year, setting its office and warehouse in São Paulo. By the end of 2000, however, new investors in Officenet force a de-merge between the two companies.

Officenet was purchased by Staples Inc. in 2004. This acquisition applied to both Officenet Argentina and Officenet Brazil. The first Staples store opened in Argentina on 13 May 2008, followed by a second on November 14, although operated under the Officenet corporation. The company retained the original Officenet name until 2011, when it was rebranded as Staples Argentina.

Officenet Argentina started one of the first corporate blogs in the country, in 2006. Advantages to a corporate blog include enhancing and continuing "a trusted relationship with consumers," improving employee satisfaction, and enabling market research. Experts say that corporate blogs like Officenet's are underused in Argentina, thereby wasting these opportunities. In 2009, usability consultant Jakob Nielsen used Officenet as a case study in his Social Networking on Intranets column.

Staples Argentina has been often cited for its corporate code. Harvard Business School Professor Walter Kuemmerle used the company in two cases – in 2000 and 2001 – for the International Entrepreneurship course. In 2007, Officenet was ranked #30 in the "Great Places to Work" list for Argentina, and appeared on the list again in 2009 at place #33. In 2008, the US Embassy in Argentina acknowledged Officenet Staples' corporate social responsibility efforts. In 2009, the US Department of State selected Officenet Staples Argentina as a finalist for the Award for Corporate Excellence (ACE).

Founder Santiago Bilinkis left the company in 2010 after 13 years.

In 2011, the company launched the "Programa Emprendedor," a program that supports start-up (entrepreneurial) companies for up to 2 years with strong (50%) discounts. The program is part of the larger "Staples Soul."

Staples Argentina continues to roll out innovative use of technology. In 2011, Staples Argentina launched a "Virtual Store" concept with QR code technology, copying a Tesco subsidiary in Korea. In 2012 Staples Argentina launched its first locally-produced TV campaign, which was enthusiastically featured in Ad Age and Adweek.

Staples Argentina was rebranded to Alot in 2021 after being acquired by a local distribution company.
