= Ghostbusters: Sanctum of Slime =

2011 video game

- Developer: Behaviour Santiago
- Publisher: Atari
- Composer: Jean-Sébastien Robitaille
- Series: Ghostbusters
- Platforms: Microsoft Windows, PlayStation 3, Xbox 360
- Release: PlayStation 3: NA: March 22, 2011; PAL: March 30, 2011; Windows, Xbox 360; March 23, 2011
- Genres: Action, twin-stick shooter
- Modes: Single-player, multiplayer

Ghostbusters: Sanctum of Slime is a cooperative action video game developed by Behaviour Santiago, and published by Atari. The game features four-player cooperative gameplay where players control Ghostbusters to defeat enemy ghosts. It was released in March 2011 for Microsoft Windows, PlayStation 3 and Xbox 360.

== Gameplay ==
Many of the cutscenes were presented as if they were drawn from a comic book, complete with bubble captions.

== Plot ==
In 2010 B.C., on an island that would become Manhattan, a large group had gathered for the funeral of a deity called Dumazu the Destroyer. An artifact called the Relic of Nilhe was broken apart, and it is believed that reuniting the Relic would revive the god. In 1954 A.D., New York City maintenance workers unearth one of the fragments; it is placed in a museum.

Ismael McEnthol is admitted to the Parkview mental hospital for suffering bizarre delusions and horrifying hallucinations of Dumazu. Later, Janosz Poha, from the Ghostbusters II film, is admitted to the hospital and is placed with McEnthol. They become friends; McEnthol makes a deal that he would give him Dana Barrett in exchange for stealing the shard. After his release, Janosz steals the shard while working at the museum, but when he returns to Parkview, he is double-crossed and left in the hospital. McEnthol keeps the shard, and goes under an alias: Dr. Michael Tesmon. Meanwhile, Janosz goes insane over possessing the shard.

The old Ghostbusters put an ad out, and assemble a team of new Ghostbusters: Alan, Gabriel, Bridget and Samuel. For their first assignment, at the Sedgewick Hotel, they track down and capture the ghost of the hotel's former head chef, LeBlog. They then go to Parkview, where they meet Dr. Tesmon, who explains that Janosz has gone insane after taking possession of the shard. The ghosts have already overtaken the hospital. The Ghostbusters analyze the shard, and clear out some of the ghosts. The boss, a psychokinetic construct of electro-shock equipment, overwhelms them. After retreating to the sewers, they fight against "Mood Slime", eventually going up against a giant one.

The Ghostbusters call Geoff, who drives the Ecto 4WD. The Ecto's top is a platform where the Ghostbusters can fight ghosts while the car weaves about the city streets. The car breaks down, but they continue fighting. After repairing the vehicle, Geoff takes them to the subway station. The Ghostbusters fight The Subway Smasher, a monster formed from subway trains. After the fight, the Ghostbusters learn that the monster was brought to life from an artifact shard.

As the Ecto 4WD is stuck, Geoff tells the Ghostbusters they walk back to headquarters to meet with the senior Ghostbusters and Janosz. The Ghostbusters take a shortcut through the St. Joseph Cemetery, where they encounter "Snobies" (snot zombies) and gargoyles. They discover a signal that controls the gargoyles, and track it down to a crop circle at the center of the graveyard, where they fight a large gargoyle called a Grotesque.

At the headquarters, Janosz explains how he was tricked into giving his shard to McEnthol. Egon and Gabriel suspect that the shards are drawn to one another like magnets, and that they can use that information to locate the remaining pieces. The next shard to find is back at The Sedgewick Hotel, but pyro maniacal ghosts called Nocnitse have set the hotel on fire. The Ghostbusters work their way through the hotel and eventually capture the Nocnitse leader, collecting another shard.

Geoff drives the Ghostbusters back to headquarters, but along the way, they fight more ghosts that are attracted to the shards, including gargoyles from the cemetery, and the mood slime that have oozed through the cracks in the streets. The street collapses, and the Ghostbusters continue on foot through the sewers where they fight Arachnid Manifestations (ghost spiders) and a Spider Queen. They also revisit a cemetery where they fight a giant Tomb Effigy that animates statues. After defeating the tomb, the Ghostbusters find another shard. They return to headquarters but find, to their horror, that the four shards they have collected have assembled by themselves. They go back to Parkview in search of Tesmon.

At Parkview, the Ghostbusters fight the previous bosses (except the Subway Smasher). They discover that Dr. Tesmon is Ismael McEnthol, the Cultist seeking to reunite the Relic of Nilhe, and that the boss monsters they have twice defeated were actually trying to stop him. McEnthol performs a ritual that revives Dumazu, with himself as a host. He transports himself and the Ghostbusters into the Ghost World for the final battle, which is against McEnthol and then Dumazu.

Following the defeat of the final boss, the Ghostbusters celebrate. Janosz also arrives and apologizes for his actions.

== Reception ==
Reception

Aggregate score
Aggregator	Score		
Aggregator	PC	PS3	Xbox 360
Metacritic	43/100	42/100	45/100

Review scores
Publication	Score		
Publication	PC	PS3	Xbox 360
1Up.com	D	D	D
Eurogamer	4/10	4/10	4/10
GamePro	N/A	N/A	3/5
GameSpot	4/10	5/10	4.5/10
GameZone	N/A	4/10	N/A
IGN	4.5/10	4.5/10	4.5/10
Official Xbox Magazine (US)	N/A	N/A	4/10
PC Gamer (US)	40%	N/A	N/A
PlayStation: The Official Magazine	N/A	3/10	N/A
TeamXbox	N/A	N/A	3.5/10

The game received "generally unfavorable reviews" on all platforms according to the review aggregation website Metacritic.

Since its release, the Xbox 360 version sold 44,065 units worldwide by the end of 2011.
