= Medellín, Spain =

Medellín
- Municipality

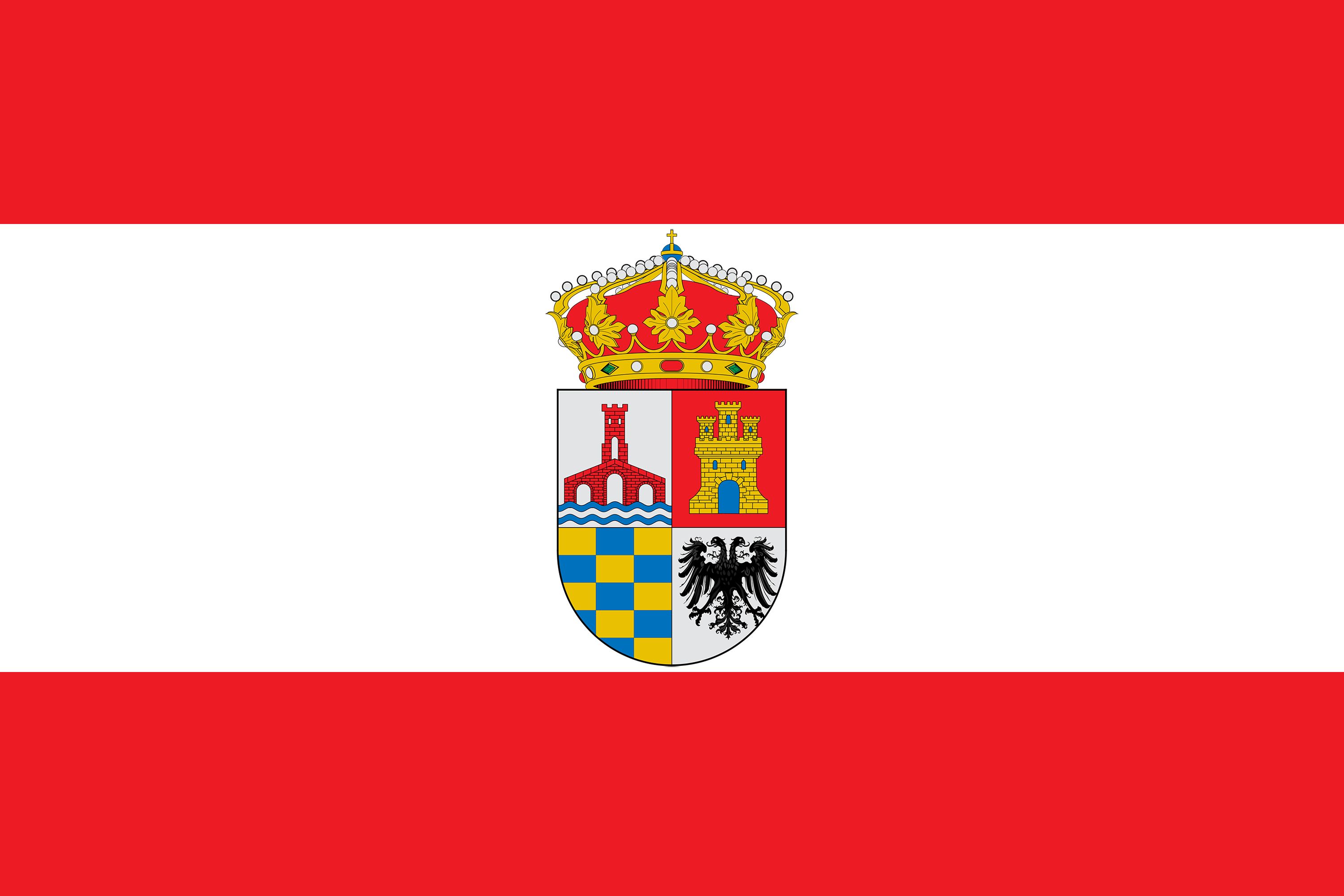
- Flag Coat of arms

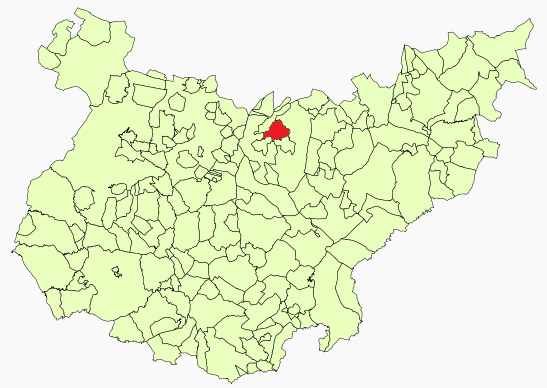
- Location of the municipality of Medellín within Badajoz

- Location of Medellín within Spain
- Coordinates: 38°57′47″N 5°57′28″W
- Country: Spain
- Region: Extremadura
- Province: Badajoz
- Comarca: Las Vegas Altas

Government
  - Type: Mayor–council
  - Body: Ayuntamiento de Medellín
  - Mayor: Antonio Parral Carmona
- Elevation: 264 m (866 ft)

Population (2025-01-01)
  - Total: 2,241
- Demonym: Metelinense
- Postal code: 06411
- Website: http://www.medellin.es/

Medellín (pronounced [meðeˈʎin]) is a village in the province of Badajoz, Extremadura, Spain, notable as both the birthplace of Hernán Cortés in 1485 and the site of the Battle of Medellín, during the Peninsular War. The second-largest city in Colombia, Medellín, was named in honour of the small village as well as Medellín, Veracruz in Mexico, two cities in Argentina, and Medellin, Cebu, in the Philippines.

The city was named after the Roman general Quintus Caecilius Metellus Pius, who founded it as a military base for his operations in western Iberia, during the Sertorian War. In Latin, it was called Metellinum. Medellín is well-known because of its cultural heritage, with places like the Roman theatre, the old castle and other archeological sites. It has a population of 2,337 (2009) and an area of 65 km^{2}.

== Gallery ==
Medellín and the Guadiana river

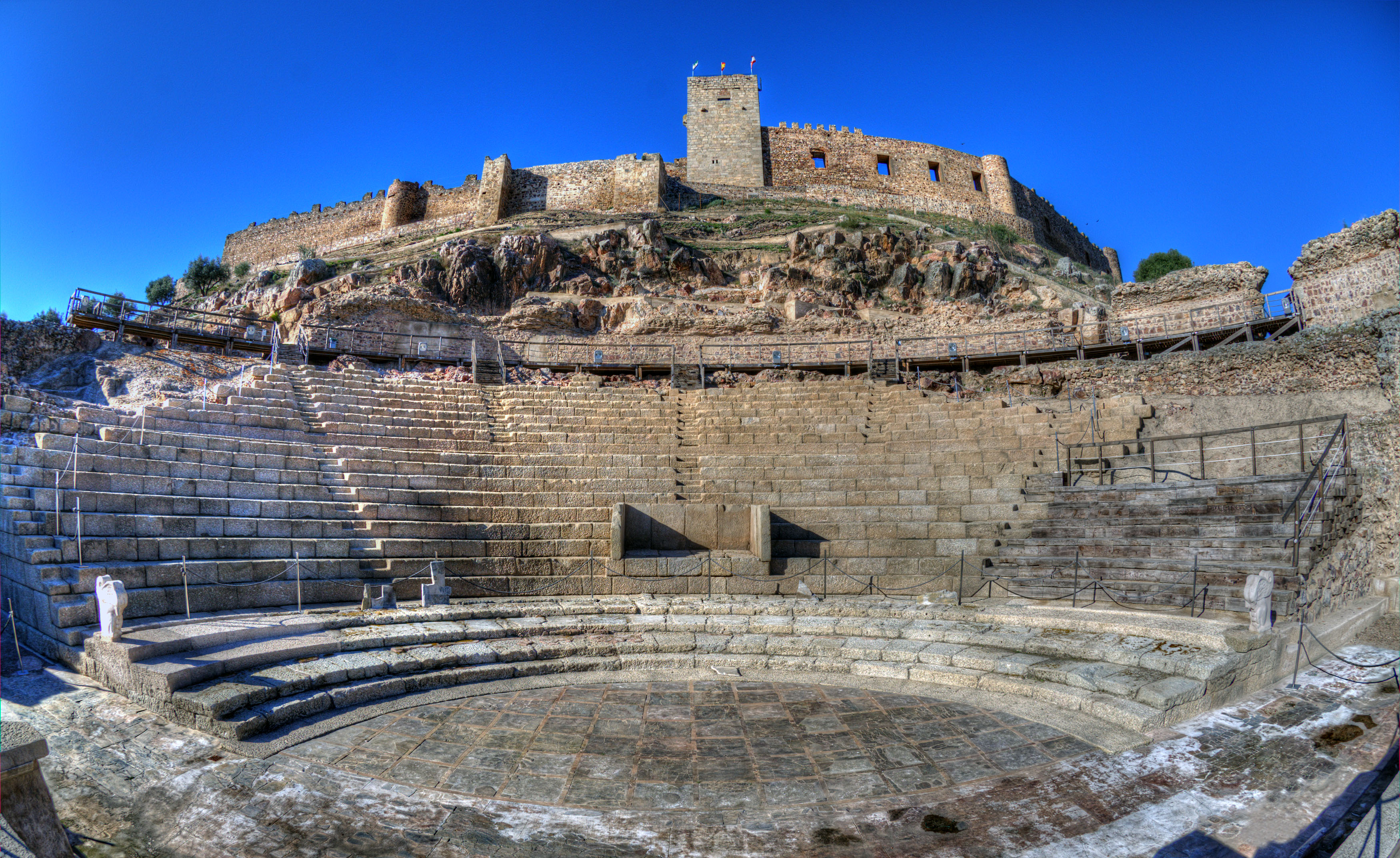
Roman theatre

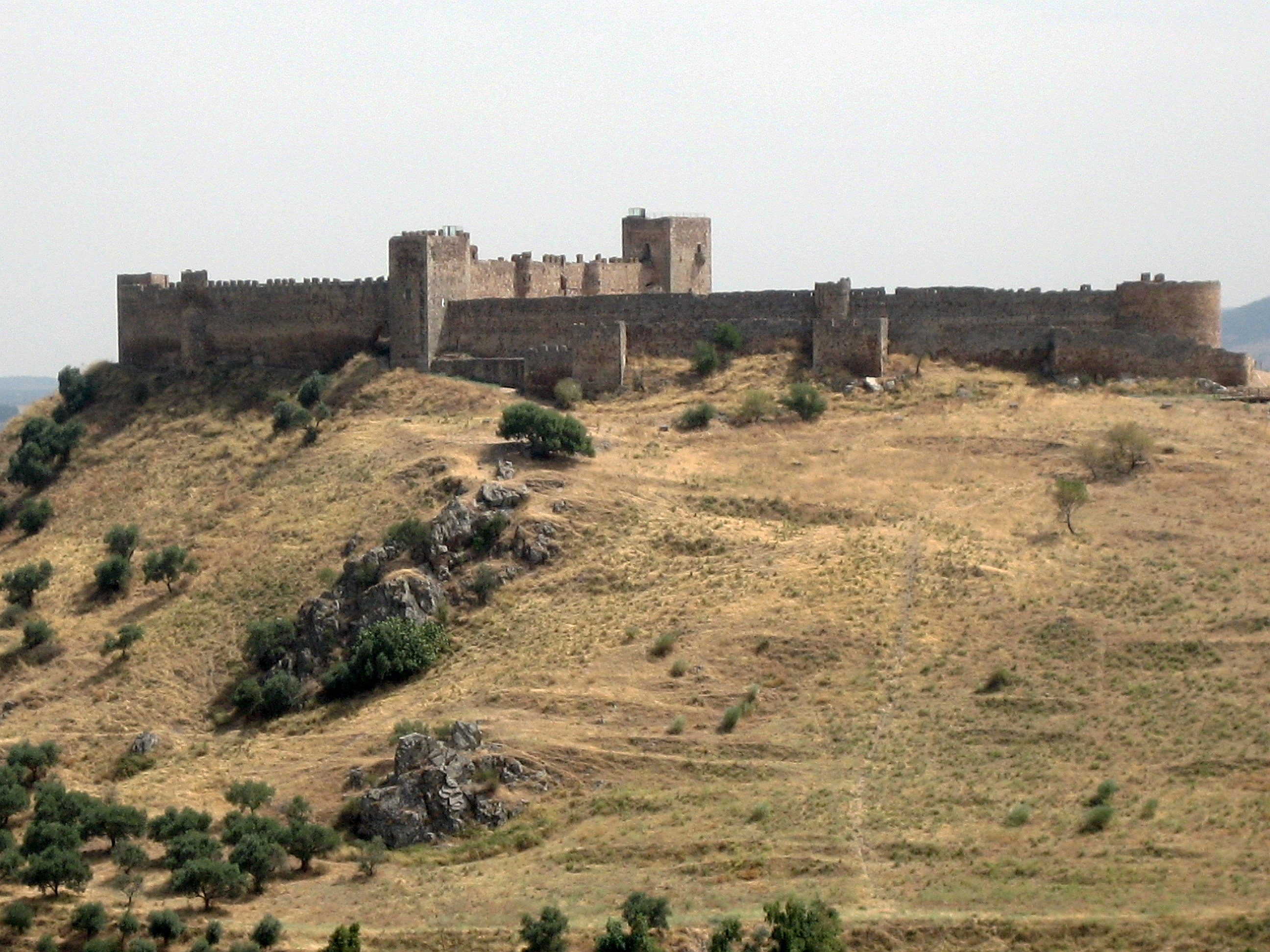
Medellín Castle

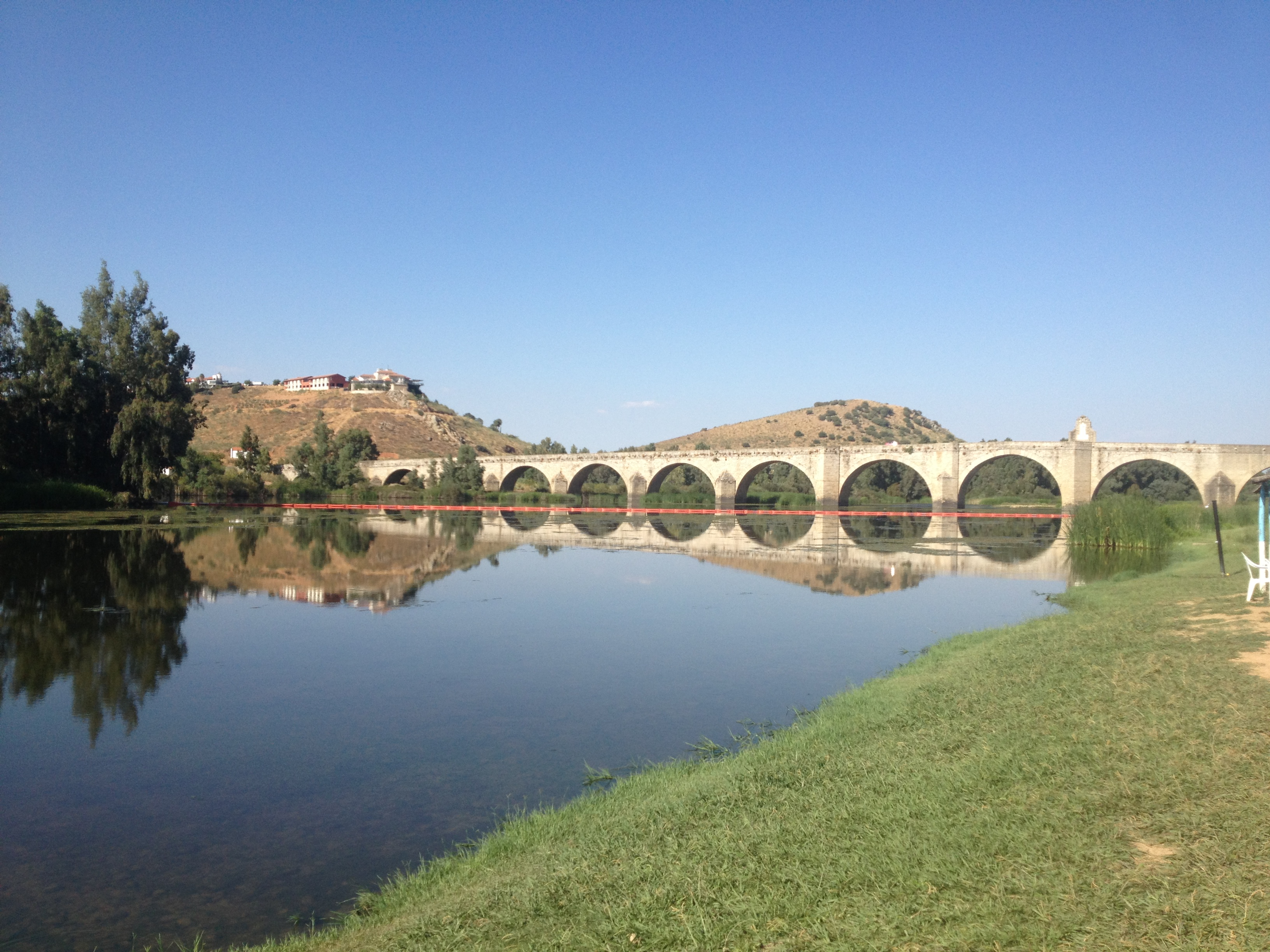
The bridge

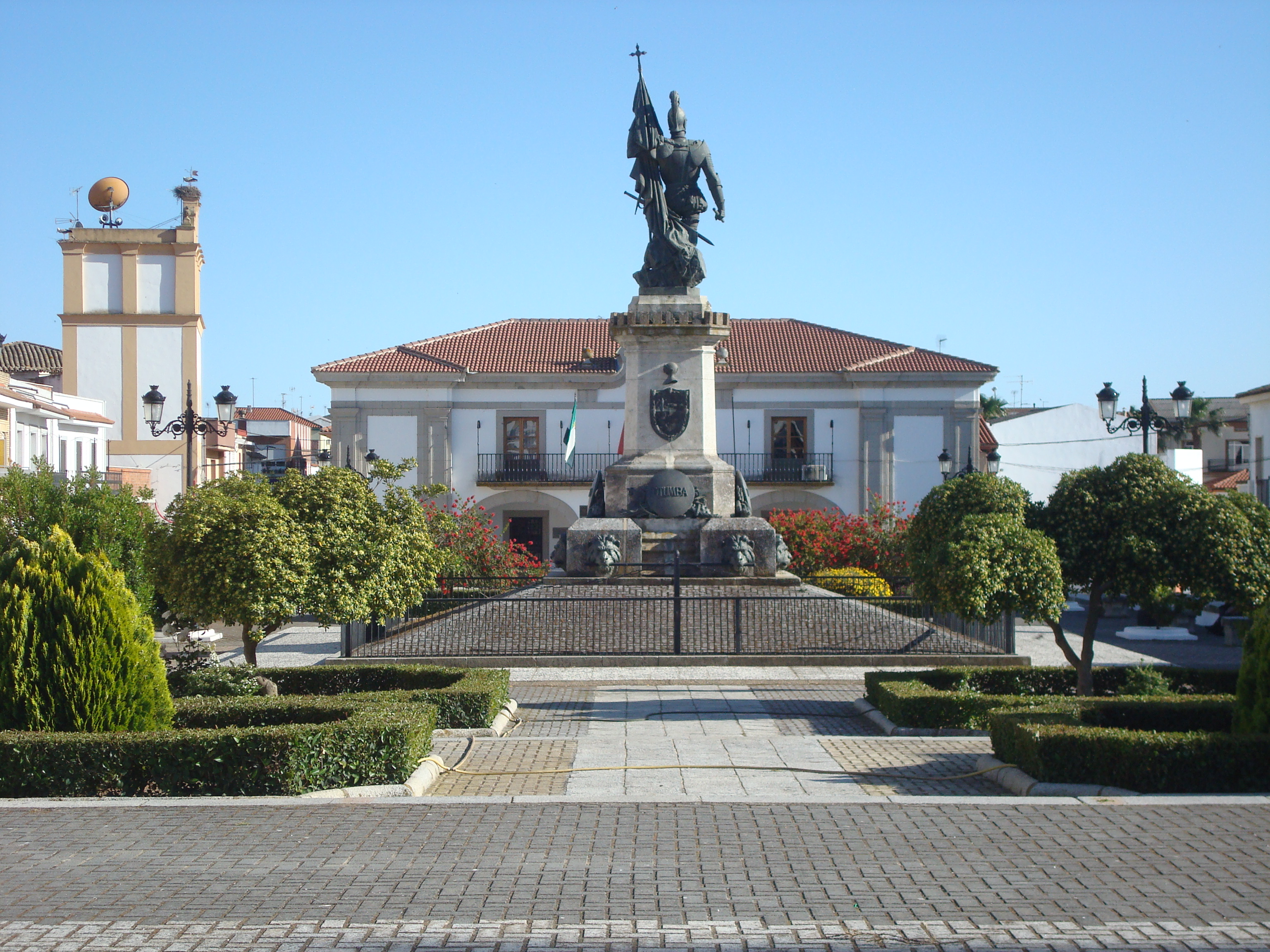
Hernán Cortés statue

== See also ==
- Monument to Hernán Cortés (Medellín)
- List of municipalities in Badajoz
- Hernán Cortés
- Conquistador
