= Monument to Hernán Cortés (Medellín) =

Monument in Medellín, Spain

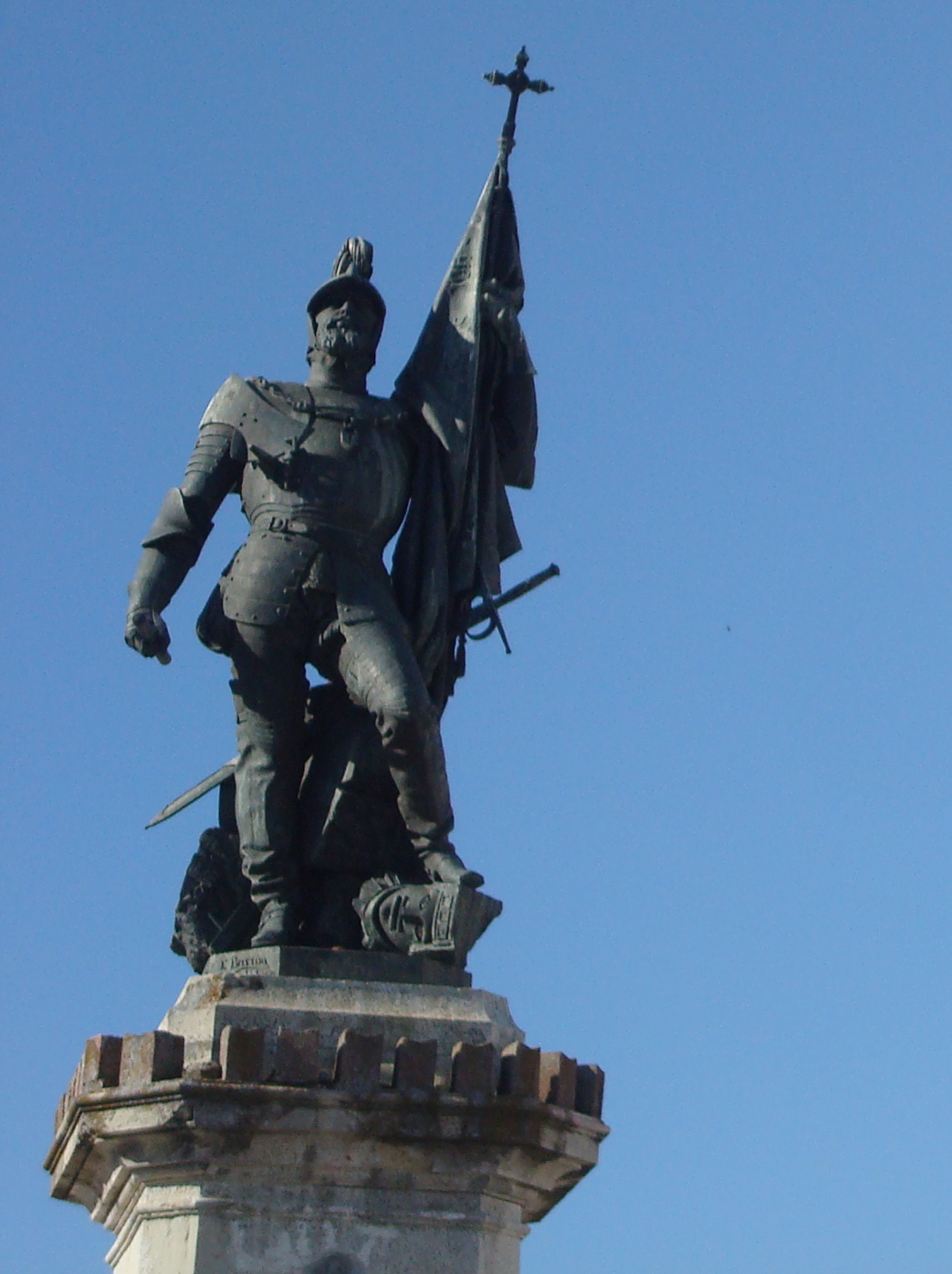
- 38.96369°N 5.957926°W
- Location: Medellín, Spain
- Designer: Eduardo Barrón
- Material: Bronze, stone
- Opening date: 2 December 1890
- Dedicated to: Hernán Cortés

The Monument to Hernán Cortés is an instance of public art dedicated to Hernán Cortés, conqueror of the Aztec Empire, erected in his native town of Medellín, Spain. It consists of a bronze rendition of Cortés designed by Eduardo Barrón on top of a stone pedestal.

== History and description ==
The first one to come up with the idea of erecting a monument to Cortés in Medellín was Carolina Coronado, formulating it as early as 1845, predating a 1858 public petition. However the realization of such plans would take decades. The project was eventually awarded to Eduardo Barrón. The model of the statue was sculpted in Rome, although the bronze was cast in Barcelona. It was funded by the Provincial Deputation of Badajoz and the Spanish State. Meanwhile, the bronze, obtained from cannons, was financed by Carlos Groizard y Coronado.

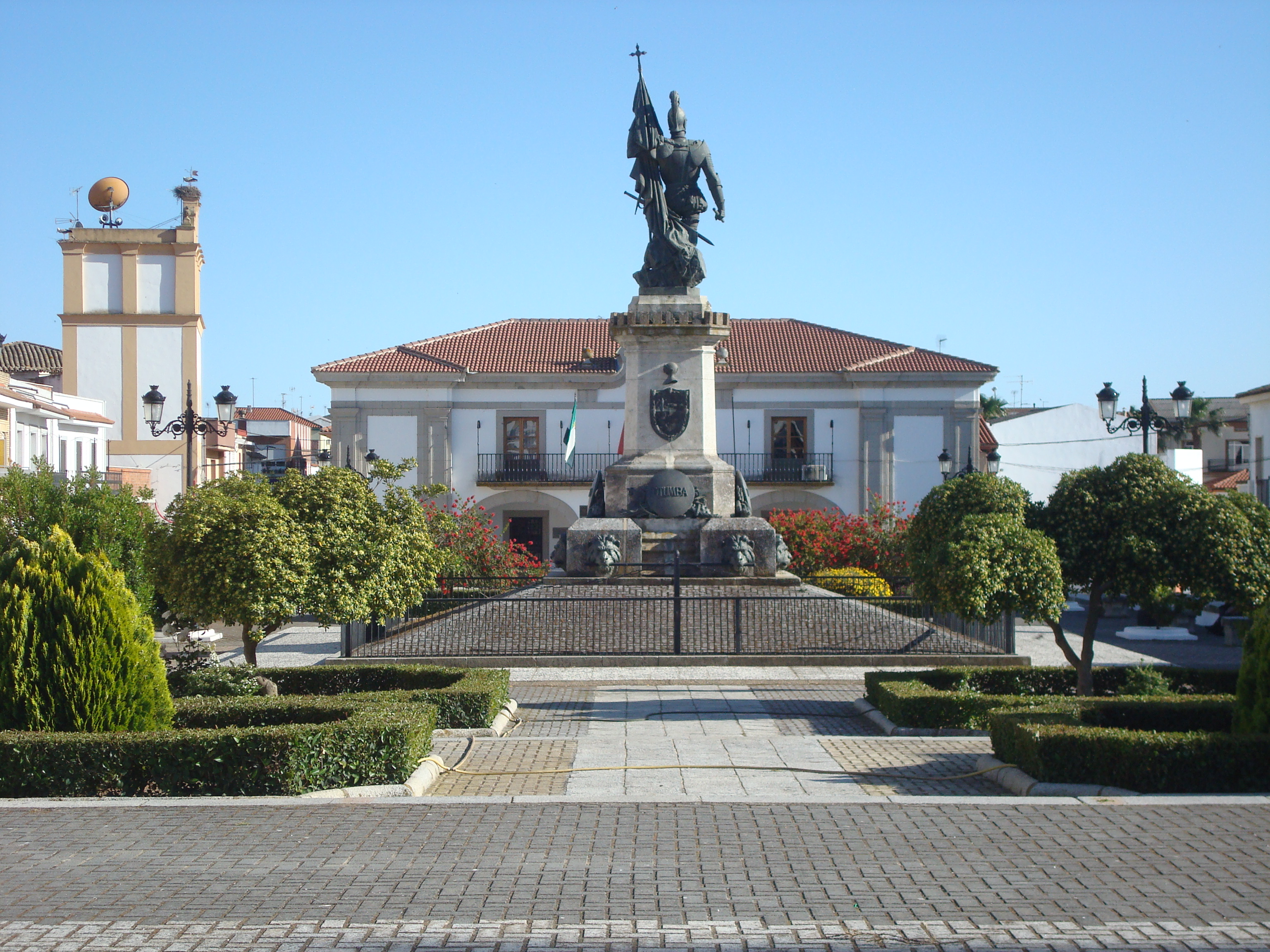
Backside view

The bronze statue of Cortés is depicted wearing armor, stepping on some Mexica idols while raising the banner of the Cross. Transported to Medellín in a journey not free from mishaps, the monument was unveiled on 2 December 1890 near the location of the old house of Cortés, during a ceremony attended by Raimundo Fernández Villaverde as representative of the national government.

The monument was vandalised in August 2010, a day after a friendly football fixture between the national teams of Mexico and Spain on the occasion of the 200th anniversary of the independence of Mexico; the statue was tagged in red paint, while vandals also left some leaflets nearby deriding the statue as "the cruel and arrogant glorification of genocide and an insult to the people of Mexico". The Mayor of Medellín, a municipality with barely 2,000 inhabitants, commented that everyone "is defined by their actions" concluding that the perpetrators "have put on themselves the label of tyranny and that of caciques because of their disrespect".
