= Assault Heroes =

2006 video game

- Cover art for the Xbox Live version.
- Developer: Wanako Games
- Publishers: Vivendi Games (Note: Released under the Sierra Online brand name); Konami (PSN)
- Platforms: Xbox 360; Windows; PlayStation 3
- Release: Xbox 360: NA: December 13, 2006; PC: NA: October 23, 2007; PS3: NA: January 28, 2010
- Genre: Top-down shooter
- Modes: Single-player, multiplayer

Assault Heroes is an arcade-style, top-down shooter video game developed by Wanako Games. The game has the player driving 4x4 vehicles, piloting speedboats, or proceeding on foot against enemy hordes. Players can play alone or co-operatively, including both online and offline 2-player co-operative modes.

Assault Heroes was originally available as an Xbox Live Arcade title. On March 19, 2008, its price was lowered when the game joined the Arcade Hits lineup. A Microsoft Windows retail version was released on October 23, 2007, and the PS3 version was added to the PlayStation Network on January 28, 2010, published by Konami in the United States.

== Story ==
Originally designed as an Xbox Live Arcade title, Assault Heroes features only minimal story elements. According to the game, the player controls "the last surviving member of an elite forces unit" searching for a secret enemy laboratory. Once located (near the end of the game), the goal is to destroy the lab and escape.

== Gameplay ==
Over the course of the game (which is very similar to the 1987 video game Time Soldiers), players battle through five progressively more difficult levels. In addition to countless lesser foes, each level generally contains several "bosses" which must be defeated in order to proceed. Using the left thumbstick to move and the right thumbstick to aim/shoot (when playing on the Xbox 360 & PS3), players dodge enemy fire while inflicting damage upon foes utilizing three primary weapons:

- Minigun - A traditional machine gun with a high rate of fire.
- Flak cannon - A cannon that, while slow, can produce devastating results.
- Flamethrower - A short-ranged weapon that continuously spews flame.

Player vehicles have access to these primary weapons at all times and can switch between them with a button press. Weapons have unlimited ammunition, although the flamethrower will "cut out" briefly if used without interruption for a period of time. Each weapon can be upgraded (up to three times) by collecting an appropriate power-up during play, although upgrades are lost if the player is killed.

Vehicle health depletes when damage is taken, but slowly replenishes over time. If a vehicle is destroyed, players are not immediately killed, but are instead thrown from the vehicle and must proceed on foot. While on foot, players are exceptionally frail and have only a small machine gun with which to defend themselves. If a player lacking a vehicle survives for a certain period of time, a new vehicle is automatically delivered and can be immediately boarded. Players can also temporarily leave their vehicle of their own free will, usually to collect power-ups which are not accessible from within a vehicle.

=== Special weapons ===
In addition to the standard weapons which vehicles are equipped with, players also have access to a limited number of grenades and nukes. Grenades are "thrown" from the current position towards a crosshair, and inflict heavy damage on anything they hit. Nukes (referred to as "smart bombs" in many other titles) explode in an area around the player, causing massive carnage to everything caught within the blast radius.

Additional quantities of both weapon types can be found and collected as power-ups during the game, with grenades being substantially more plentiful than nukes.

=== Bonus areas ===
Each level features a single underground bonus area. These are accessed by entering a specially-marked structure, which then transports the player(s) into an underground bunker. While underground, players are always on foot, and hence are easily killed. However, if players do die during these bonus sections, no life is actually lost; instead, players are immediately returned to the main (above ground) level and continue as before.

At the end of each underground area is an extra life (or "1-up"), earned for successfully completing the sub-level.

=== Multiplayer play ===
When playing with two players, both players share the same screen and work co-operatively to destroy enemy forces. Players cannot harm each other directly, although they can scroll (or refuse to scroll) the screen in a manner which can be problematic for the other player. The game does not increase or otherwise change the quantity and difficulty level of enemy forces based on the presence of a second player. As a result, having a second player can make gameplay somewhat easier.

Players can play multiplayer either offline, or online via Xbox Live or PSN. When playing offline, high scores are not recorded on the leaderboards for either player if one of the players is using a local account.

== Reception ==
Reception

Aggregate score
Aggregator	Score
Metacritic	79/100 (X360)

Review scores
Publication	Score
Eurogamer	7/10
G4	4/5
GameSpot	7.9/10
IGN	8.7/10
TeamXbox	8.5/10

Assault Heroes received positive reviews from critics. On Metacritic, the Xbox 360 version of the game has a score of 79/100 based on 16 reviews, indicating "generally favorable reviews".

== Sequel ==
- Assault Heroes 2
