= Justa Freire =

Spanish teacher (1896–1965)

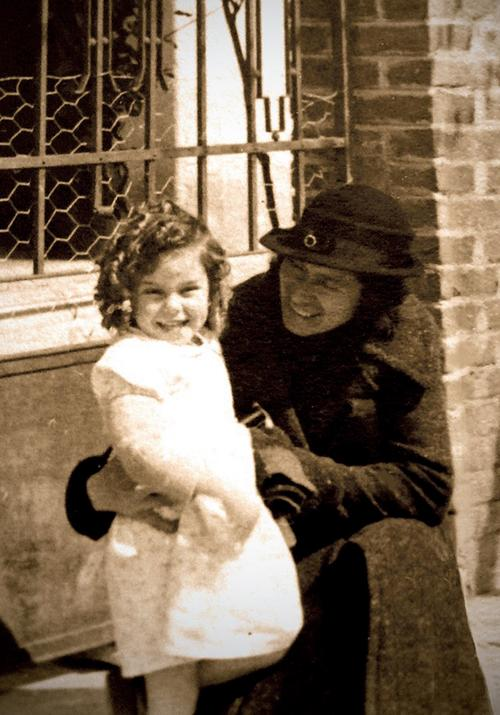
- In Madrid, c. 1933
- Born: Justa Freire Méndez; 4 August 1896; Moraleja del Vino, Spain
- Died: 15 July 1965 (aged 68); Madrid, Spain
- Education: Normal School of Zamora; School of Higher Teacher Training
- Occupation: Educator

Justa Freire Méndez (4 August 1896 – 15 July 1965) was a Spanish educator.

== Biography ==
Justa Freire was born in Moraleja del Vino on 4 April 1896. After studying teaching at the Normal School of Zamora, she passed the competitive examination for a position as a national school teacher in 1918. The same year, she joined the Unión General de Trabajadores (UGT), specifically its Federation of Education Workers. She briefly taught school in Casillas, Ávila.

In 1921, she moved to Madrid, where she obtained a position at the Colegio Cervantes, a center affiliated with the Institución Libre de Enseñanza, which educated the children of workers from the Cuatro Caminos neighborhood. There, Freire was responsible for social activities (maintaining the school, the dining hall, welcoming new students, family gatherings, and reunions with alumni), as well as the center's educational programs (nursery school, teacher training, and attending to visitors). Also, the Board for the Extension of Studies and Scientific Research financed trips to Belgium and France to improve her pedagogical training.

After graduating from the School of Higher Teacher Training in 1932, Freire dedicated herself to teaching pedagogy courses in Pamplona and San Martín de Valdeiglesias. In November 1933, she was appointed director of the Alfredo Calderón School Group (later renamed CEIP Padre Poveda) in Madrid's Ciudad Jardín, becoming one of the first Spanish women to lead an all-male team of teachers. She kept a diary of all pedagogical work she carried out at this educational center. Furthermore, she shared her innovative experiences with the educational community through her publications in the journal Escuelas de España (Schools of Spain). During this period, she collaborated with the Pedagogical Missions.

Due to the Civil War and the proximity of the rebel army to Madrid, classes could no longer be held normally at the Alfredo Calderón School. Therefore, in December 1936, an order was given to close it and evacuate its students to the Valencian Community. There, the Spanish government commissioned Freire to participate in the creation and development of the Family Education Communities, along with other prominent educators such as Ángel Llorca. Due to her excellent work, the government promoted her several times: Inspector-Visitor of Colonies, Regional Delegate of the National Council for Evacuated Children, and finally National Delegate.

At the end of the Civil War, in May 1939, the dictatorship arrested Freire, and that September a drumhead court-martial sentenced her to six years in prison as part of a series of reprisals against teachers. She was ultimately imprisoned for two years. During her time in the Ventas Women's Prison, she took charge of the adult education program, assisted by other teachers such as Rafaela González Quesada. The younger prisoners – minors, including some of Las Trece Rosas – were cared for by María Sánchez Arbós.

After being released from Ventas in 1941, she gave private lessons until 1944, when she began working as a secretary and teacher at the British School. In 1952, she requested permission to rejoin the national teaching corps. The following year, she managed to regain her teaching position, but lost all previous privileges, along with her seniority, and was expressly prohibited from teaching in Madrid. Therefore, in 1954, she was appointed teacher at the Padre Algué School in the Barcelona municipality of Manresa. In 1958, she was transferred to the National Teaching Service's Didactic Guidance Center in Madrid and returned to teaching at the British School. In those final years, she contributed articles to the magazine El Magisterio Español. She died in Madrid on 15 July 1965.

== Tributes ==
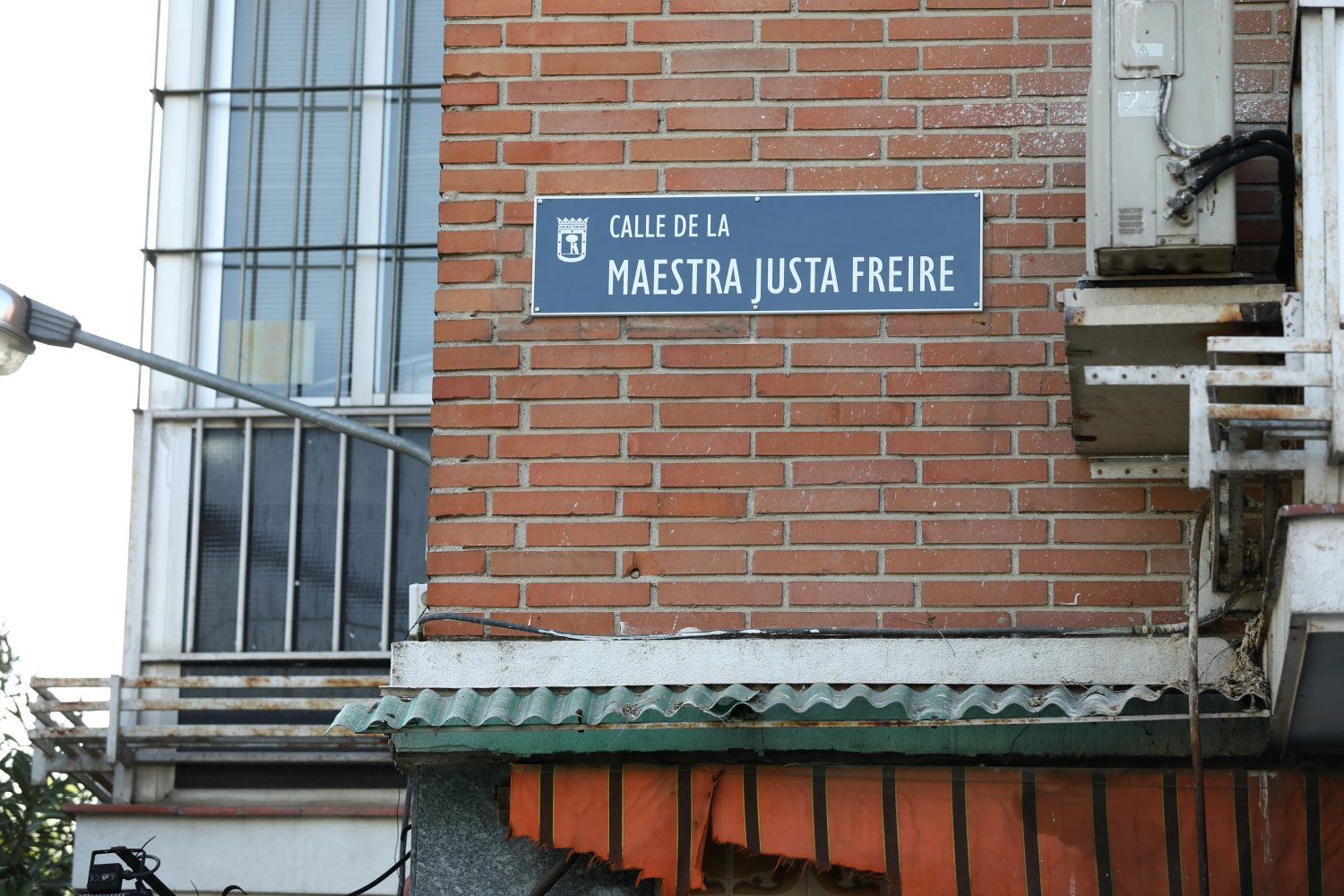
Maestra Justa Freire Street in 2018

Freire had a street named after her in Madrid's Las Águilas neighborhood in 2018. In May 2021, the Madrid Superior Court of Justice ruled to restore its previous name, Millán-Astray, after the head of propaganda for the fascist side in the Civil War.

She was one of the Republican teachers specifically honored at the "Diaries of Freedom: Teachers and Educators of the Republic" conference organized by UGT at the Galileo Cultural Center in Madrid from 14 to 16 November 2017.

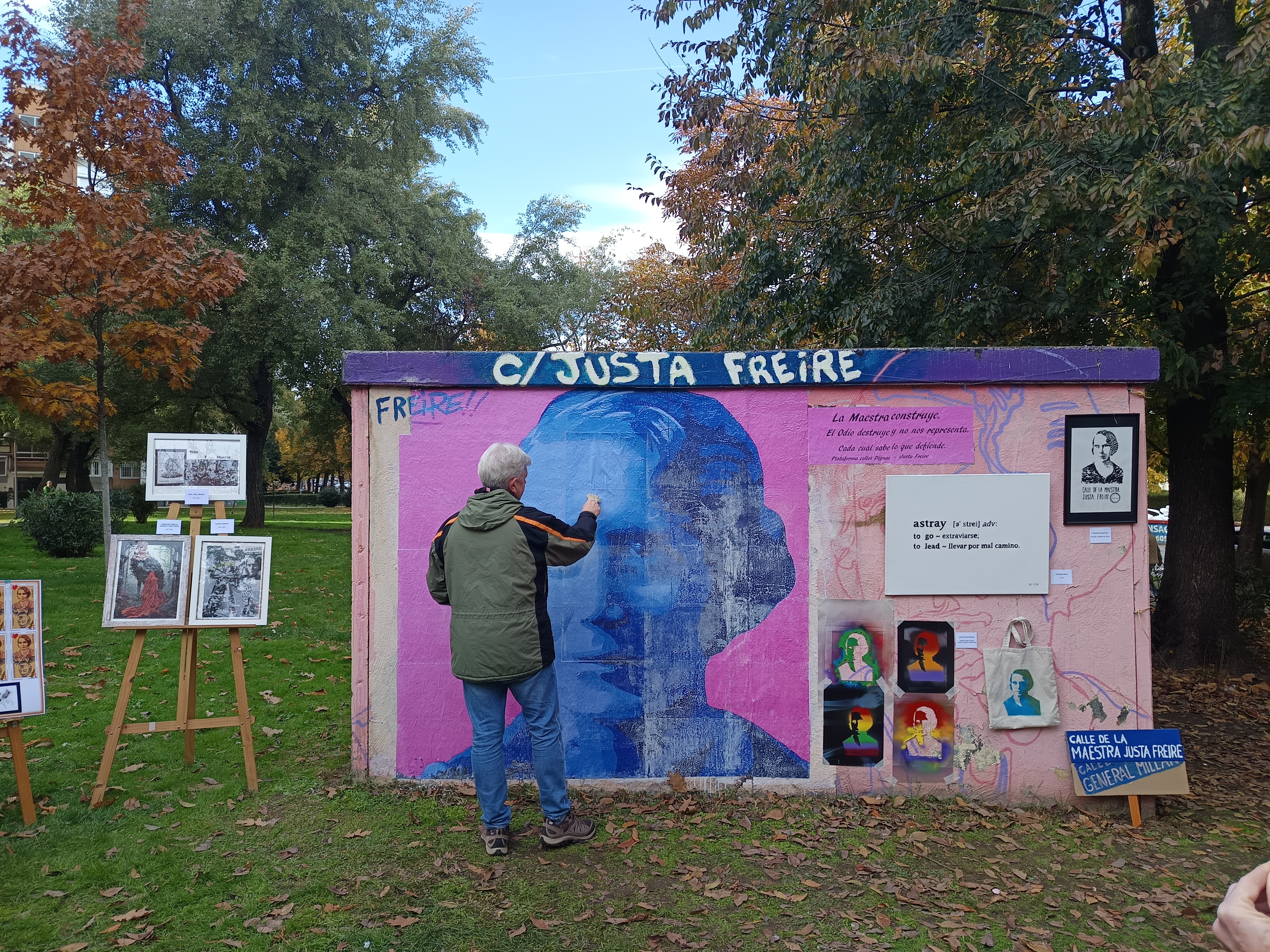
Restoration work on Freire's mural in November 2025

In March 2022, a group of residents organized as the Platform for the Name of Maestra Justa Freire Street, created a mural in her honor, which was initially prevented from being completed by the Madrid Municipal Police. Over the following three years it was vandalized at least four times with fascist messages.

In April 2022, a commemorative plaque was installed at CEIP Padre Poveda.

In March 2023, Fanjul Station on the Cercanías Madrid C-5 line was renamed Maestra Justa Freire-Polideportivo Aluche.

In 2023, a postage stamp was dedicated to her for the #8MTodoElAño collection, with a print run of 125,000.
