= Assault Heroes 2 =

2008 video game

- Developer: Wanako Games
- Publisher: Vivendi Games (Note: Released under the Sierra Online brand name)
- Platform: Xbox 360
- Release: May 14, 2008
- Genre: Top-down shooter
- Modes: Single-player, multiplayer

Assault Heroes 2 is the sequel to Assault Heroes, an arcade-style, top-down shooter video game developed by Chilean Wanako Games. The game was released for Xbox 360 via Xbox Live Arcade on May 14, 2008.

== Gameplay ==
Assault Heroes 2 gameplay screenshot.

The core gameplay remains the same as the first Assault Heroes, but the player now has the ability to hijack enemy units, allowing players to man such vehicles as tanks and helicopters. The game also features above and underground on-foot only areas, with larger maps than the previous game's on-foot underground lairs.

== Multiplayer ==
The game still supports two player co-op multiplayer both on- and off-line, and teammates may now link weapons for increased damage.

== Reception ==
Reception

Aggregate score
Aggregator	Score
Metacritic	75/100

Review scores
Publication	Score
Destructoid	7/10
Eurogamer	7/10
GameSpot	7.5/10
GameZone	8.5/10
IGN	8.5/10
Official Xbox Magazine (US)	7/10
TeamXbox	7/10

GameSpot's Tom McShea scored the game a 7.5/10 saying: "Despite the lack of innovation, this is one of the best shooters on the service, an eminently enjoyable old-school romp". IGN awarded the game an 8.5/10: "One of the best shooters on XBLA has returned" and "Assault Heroes 2 is a great game for Xbox Live Arcade, especially if you've never played through the original. It changes and improves elements from the original while still holding onto what everyone loved about the first game".
