= Arkadian Warriors =

2007 video game

- Developer: Wanako Games
- Publisher: Vivendi Games (Note: Released under the Sierra Online brand name)
- Platform: Xbox 360 (XBLA)
- Release: December 12, 2007
- Genre: Action RPG
- Modes: Single-player, multiplayer

Arkadian Warriors is an action role-playing game published by Vivendi Games under the Sierra Online division and developed by Wanako Games for the Xbox 360's Xbox Live Arcade service. The title was officially announced during the 2007 Leipzig Games Convention and was later released on December 12, 2007.

== Gameplay ==
Typical gameplay screenshot.

Players select one of three different character classes to play as from the choices of "Soldier", "Archer", and "Sorcerer". Players can play alone, or cooperatively with another player locally or over Xbox Live.

During play, characters are tasked with saving the land of Arkadia by completing a series of 19 quests, ultimately defeating the evil Gorgon. Quests are received at a town hub where other activities can also be carried out. Most of these quests are relatively straightforward in nature, such as recovering some quantity of a certain item, or defeating certain foes.

Within the randomly generated dungeon, players battle large numbers of enemies using abilities specific to their class. Upon gaining a certain amount of experience, characters increase in power and gain additional spells or skills. Additionally, while battling foes, a meter slowly fills which allows players to temporarily morph into a beastly form. These alter egos take the shape of a phoenix, lion or dragon, depending on class.

== Reception ==
Arkadian Warriors met with an icy reception at IGN, where it earned a grade of "Mediocre" (5.7/10). The review concludes, "We can handle repetitious gameplay in our dungeon crawlers -- it's generally mindless fun. When you add in a total lack of variety in dungeon and mission design and toss a bunch of generic monsters our way, it just becomes mindless." The GameSpot review also blasted the title for its generic and repetitive gameplay, earning it a similar "Mediocre" (5.0/10) score. Trigames.NET contributor Patrick Hickey Jr. said that Arkadian Warriors "feels like a haphazard clone of a dozen other good games and leaves its owner wanting to play something else."

== See also ==
- Diablo
- Gauntlet: Dark Legacy
- Ys
