= Alessandro Nelli =

Italian entrepreneur

Alessandro Nelli (Rome, 28 January 1842 – Russia?, after 1897) was an Italian entrepreneur. Nelli was the founder of the Fonderia Nelli (Nelli Foundry), which was the leading sculpture foundry in Rome from 1880 to 1900. He participated to national, international and universal exhibitions, winning several prizes and medals. He exported more than 100 pieces to the 1893 World's Columbian Exposition in Chicago. Nelli made artistic bronzes for several Italian and foreign artists, including several American artists.

== Works ==
- Odoardo Tabacchi, Monument to Arnaldo da Brescia, Brescia, Piazzale Arnaldo
- Ettore Ferrari, Monument to King Vittorio Emanuele II, Riva degli Schiavoni, Venice^{[5]}
- William Wetmore Story, Monument to William Prescott, Boston
- William Wetmore Story, Monument John Marshall, US Supreme Court, Washington D.C.
- Pius Welonsky, Gladiator, National Museum, Warsaw
- Franklin Simmons, Monument to John Logan, Logan Circle, Washington, D.C., 1892–1901
- Eugenio Maccagnani, Monument to Giuseppe Garibaldi, Brescia
- Reliquary of St Adamo Abate, Guglionesi
- Edward Müller, The Torch, Accademia di San Luca, Rome^{[6]}
- Ernesto Biondi, Monument to Manuel Montt and Antonio Varas, Santiago, Chile, 1900–1904
- Ernesto Biondi, Saturnalia, Galleria Nazionale d'Arte Moderna, Rome
- Giulio Tadolini, Equestrian monument to King Vittorio Emanuele II, 1890, Perugia
- Giulio Tadolini, Monument to Dalmacio Vélez Sársfield, 1893, Córdoba, Argentina
- Richard Henry Park, Monument to Vice President Thomas A. Hendricks, 1890, Indiana State House, Indianapolis, US
- Randolph Rogers, The last arrow, 1879–1880, Metropolitan Museum of Art, New York City
- Carlo Filippo Chiaffarino, Monument to Count Canevaro, Zoagli, Genoa
- Pietro Costa, Monument to King Victor Emmanuel II, 1881–1889, Turin
- Ettore Ferrari, Monument to King Victor Emmanuel II, c. 1880, Venice
- Ettore Ferrari, Monument to the poet Ovidius, 1887, Constanța, Romania
- Giulio Monteverde, Monument to King Victor Emmanuel II, 1888, Bologna
- Giulio Monteverde, Monument to King Victor Emmanuel II, 1889, Ferrara
- Giovanni Anderlini, Monument to Simón Bolívar, 1889, Guayaquil
- Eugenio Maccagnani, Monument to Giuseppe Garibaldi, 1889, Brescia
- Vincenzo Ragusa, Monument to Giuseppe Garibaldi, 1892, Palermo
- Augusto Rivalta, Monument to King Victor Emmanuel, 1893, Livorno
- Cesare Zocchi, Monument to Dante Alighieri, 1896, Trento
- Giovanni Ciniselli, Monument to marquiss Bernardo de Sá da Bandeira, 1884, Lisbon
- Felipe Moratilla, Monument to general José Prudencio Padilla, Riohacha
- Manuel Oms Canet, Monument to queen Isabella of Castilla, 1883, Madrid
- Eduardo Barrón González, Viriatus, 1883, Zamora
- Prosper d’Épinay, Paul et Virginie, Curepipe

== Additional sources ==
- Angelo de Gubernatis, Dizionario di artisti italiani viventi, Firenze, 1906, p. 235.
- Thieme-Becker, Allgemeinesküntlerlexikon, p. 25, p. 385
- E. Colle, A. Griseri, R. Valeriani, Bronzi decorativi in Italia: bronzisti e fonditori italiani dal Seicento all'Ottocento, Milano, Electa, 2001, pp. 42, 320–323, 386 ISBN 978-88-435-7218-2.
- P. Coen, Il recupero del Rinascimento. Arte, politica e mercato nei primi anni di Roma capitale (1870–1911), Silvana Editoriale, Cinisello Balsamo, 2020, pp. 177–187 ISBN 9788836645435.
