= Santiago Bilinkis =

Argentine businessman

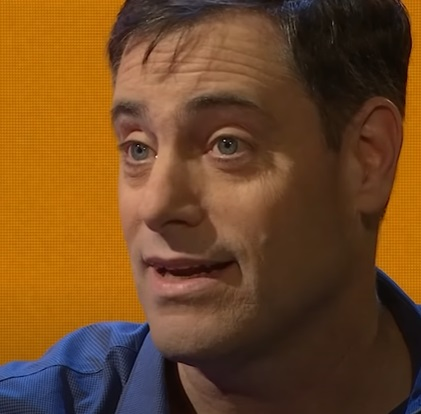
- Bilinkis in 2019
- Born: December 9, 1970 (age 55); Buenos Aires, Argentina
- Education: Universidad de San Andrés
- Occupations: Writer; businessman
- Children: 3
- Awards: Premio Konex
- Website: bilinkis.com

Santiago Bilinkis (born December 9, 1970, in Buenos Aires) is an Argentine entrepreneur, technologist, and author. He studied at the Colegio Nacional de Buenos Aires and continued his studies at the Universidad de San Andrés, where he graduated as an economist with a gold medal. He is a member of the Mensa organization and one of TEDxRiodelaPlata's organizers.

== Professional life ==
As a businessperson, he was co-founder and CEO of Officenet, the largest office supplies dealer in Argentina and Brazil, acquired by Staples Inc. in 2004. A case called "Officenet: how to make entrepreneurship work in Argentina" was written by Harvard Business School and taught at over 25 universities. He also co-founded several other companies, including Wanako Games, Restorando, acquired by The Fork; and Sirena, among others.

He is very active in the non-profit sector as well, having served as a board member to NGOs such as Endeavor, CIPPEC and Chequeado. The Konex Foundation awarded him a Konex Award mention as one of the top five business innovators of the last 10 years in 2018. The City of Buenos Aires awarded him as a “Notable Citizen in Science and Technology”.

He is the author of the blog Riesgo y Recompensa, one of the most popular on Technology and Entrepreneurship in Latin America. He has written two books: "Pasaje al futuro" (Penguin Random House, 2014, six editions) and "Guía para sobrevivir al presente: Atrapados en la era digital" (Penguin Random House, 2019, five editions).

As a technologist, he was selected in 2010 to attend the Global Solutions Program at Singularity University in Silicon Valley, where he learned from the most notable scientists and business leaders in areas such as Artificial Intelligence, Robotics, Biotech, Nanotech and Neuroscience.

As a science and technology communicator, he is the host of a radio show and podcast at "Todo pasa", one of the most widely heard in Argentina and writes a column for “Infobae” newspaper. In 2013 he was featured on the Discovery Channel documentary "2111", together with notable futurists Ray Kurzweil, James Canton and Aubrey de Grey.

As a keynote speaker, he gave numerous speeches at universities such as MIT Sloan School of Management and Harvard Business School, and for many companies and governmental entities. He is also one of the organizers of TEDxRiodelaPlata.

Santiago graduated with gold medal in Economics at San Andrés University.
