= Behaviour Santiago =

Chilean video game developer

Behaviour Interactive Chile Ltda.
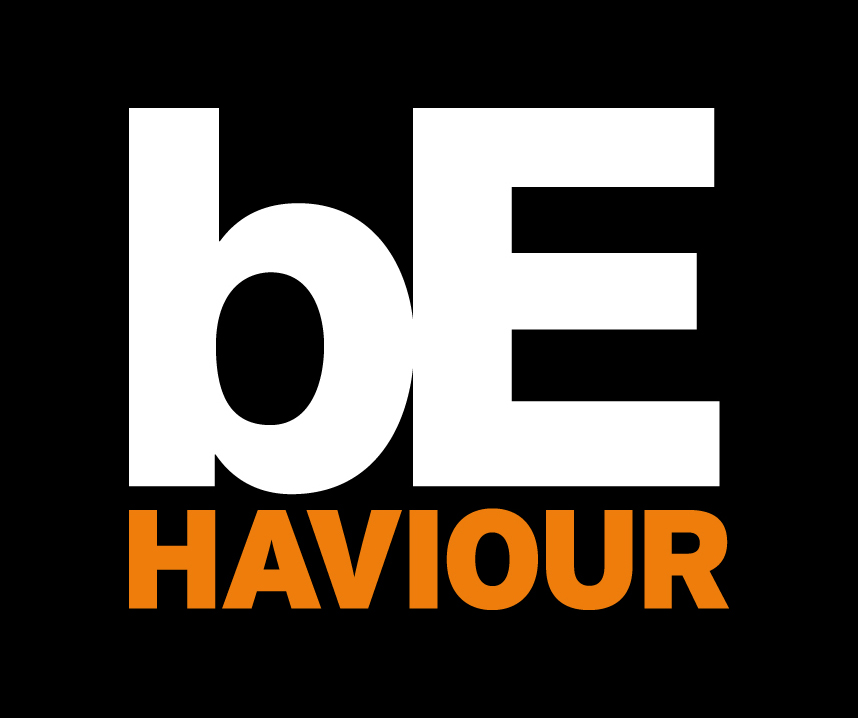
- Formerly: Wanako Games Chile Ltda. (2002–2010)
- Company type: Subsidiary
- Industry: Video games
- Founded: 2002; 23 years ago
- Founders: Esteban Sosnik; Tiburcio de la Cárcova; Santiago Bilinkis; Wenceslao Casares
- Defunct: 20 November 2017; 7 years ago
- Fate: Dissolved
- Headquarters: Santiago, Chile
- Parent: Vivendi Games (2007–2008); Activision (2008); Behaviour Interactive (2008–2017)

Behaviour Interactive Chile Ltda. (Behaviour Santiago; formerly Wanako Games Chile Ltda.) was a Chilean video game developer based in Santiago. The company was founded as Wanako Games in 2002, by Esteban Sosnik, Tiburcio de la Cárcova, Santiago Bilinkis, Wenceslao Casares. The studio was first acquired by Vivendi Games in February 2007 and ended up under Artificial Mind and Movement in December 2008. When Artificial Mind and Movement was renamed Behaviour Interactive in 2010, Wanako Games was renamed Behaviour Santiago. Behaviour Santiago was shut down on 20 November 2017.

Wanako Games's logo (2002–2010)

== History ==
Wanako Games was founded in 2002 by Esteban Sosnik, Tiburcio de la Cárcova, Santiago Bilinkis, Wenceslao Casares.

In February 2007, the studio was acquired by Vivendi Games for US$10 million, leaving it under the umbrella of Sierra Online, the Vivendi division in charge of producing online games and which, until then, had been the distributor of games. Wanako Games. Casares withdrew from the company after the sale.

On 20 February 2007, the studio announced that it had been acquired by Vivendi Games. After the merger between Vivendi Games and Activision that formed Activision Blizzard in July 2008, Wanako Games was sold by Activision to Artificial Mind and Movement on 15 December 2008. On 8 November 2010, Artificial Mind and Movement changed its name to Behaviour Interactive, also renaming Wanako Games to Behaviour Santiago. The studio was shut down on 20 November 2017. A mobile game based on Westworld was finished before shutting down and was released on 1 February 2018.

== Games developed ==
| Year | Title | Platform(s) | | | | | | | | | |
| Year | Title | PS3 | Win | X360 | PS4 | XONE | Wii U | 3DS | Vita | IOS | AND |
|---|---|---|---|---|---|---|---|---|---|---|---|
| 2004 | Ford Virtual Racing | No | Yes | No | No | No | No | No | No | No | No |
| 2004 | Cut to the Beat | No | Yes | No | No | No | No | No | No | No | No |
| 2004 | Blackhawk Striker 2 | No | Yes | No | No | No | No | No | No | No | No |
| 2004 | Groove-O-Matic | No | Yes | No | No | No | No | No | No | No | No |
| 2004 | Phoenix Assault | No | Yes | No | No | No | No | No | No | No | No |
| 2005 | Polar Tubing | No | Yes | No | No | No | No | No | No | No | No |
| 2005 | everGirl | No | Yes | No | No | No | No | No | No | No | No |
| 2005 | Jewel Thief | No | Yes | No | No | No | No | No | No | No | No |
| 2005 | Tornado Jockey | No | Yes | No | No | No | No | No | No | No | No |
| 2006 | Blasterball 3 | No | Yes | No | No | No | No | No | No | No | No |
| 2006 | Assault Heroes | Yes | Yes | Yes | No | No | No | No | No | No | No |
| 2007 | Sea Life Safari | No | Yes | Yes | No | No | No | No | No | No | No |
| 2007 | 3D Ultra Minigolf Adventures | No | Yes | Yes | No | No | No | No | No | No | No |
| 2007 | Arkadian Warriors | No | Yes | Yes | No | No | No | No | No | No | No |
| 2008 | Assault Heroes 2 | No | No | Yes | No | No | No | No | No | No | No |
| 2009 | Revenge of the Wounded Dragons | Yes | No | No | No | No | No | No | No | No | No |
| 2010 | 3D Ultra Minigolf Adventures 2 | Yes | No | Yes | No | No | No | No | No | No | No |
| 2010 | Doritos Crash Course | No | No | Yes | No | No | No | No | No | No | No |
| 2010 | Tetris | Yes | No | No | No | No | No | No | No | No | No |
| 2011 | Wipeout in the Zone | No | No | Yes | No | No | No | No | No | No | No |
| 2011 | Wipeout 2 | Yes | No | Yes | No | No | No | No | No | No | No |
| 2011 | Voltron: Defender of the Universe | Yes | No | Yes | No | No | No | No | No | No | No |
| 2011 | Ghostbusters: Sanctum of Slime | Yes | Yes | Yes | No | No | No | No | No | No | No |
| 2015 | SpongeBob HeroPants | No | No | Yes | No | No | No | Yes | Yes | No | No |
| 2015 | Fallout Shelter | No | No | No | No | No | No | No | No | Yes | Yes |
| 2015 | The Peanuts Movie: Snoopy's Grand Adventure | No | No | Yes | Yes | Yes | Yes | Yes | No | No | No |
| 2018 | Westworld | No | No | No | No | No | No | No | No | Yes | Yes |
