= Andrés Freire =

Argentine entrepreneur

Andy Freire
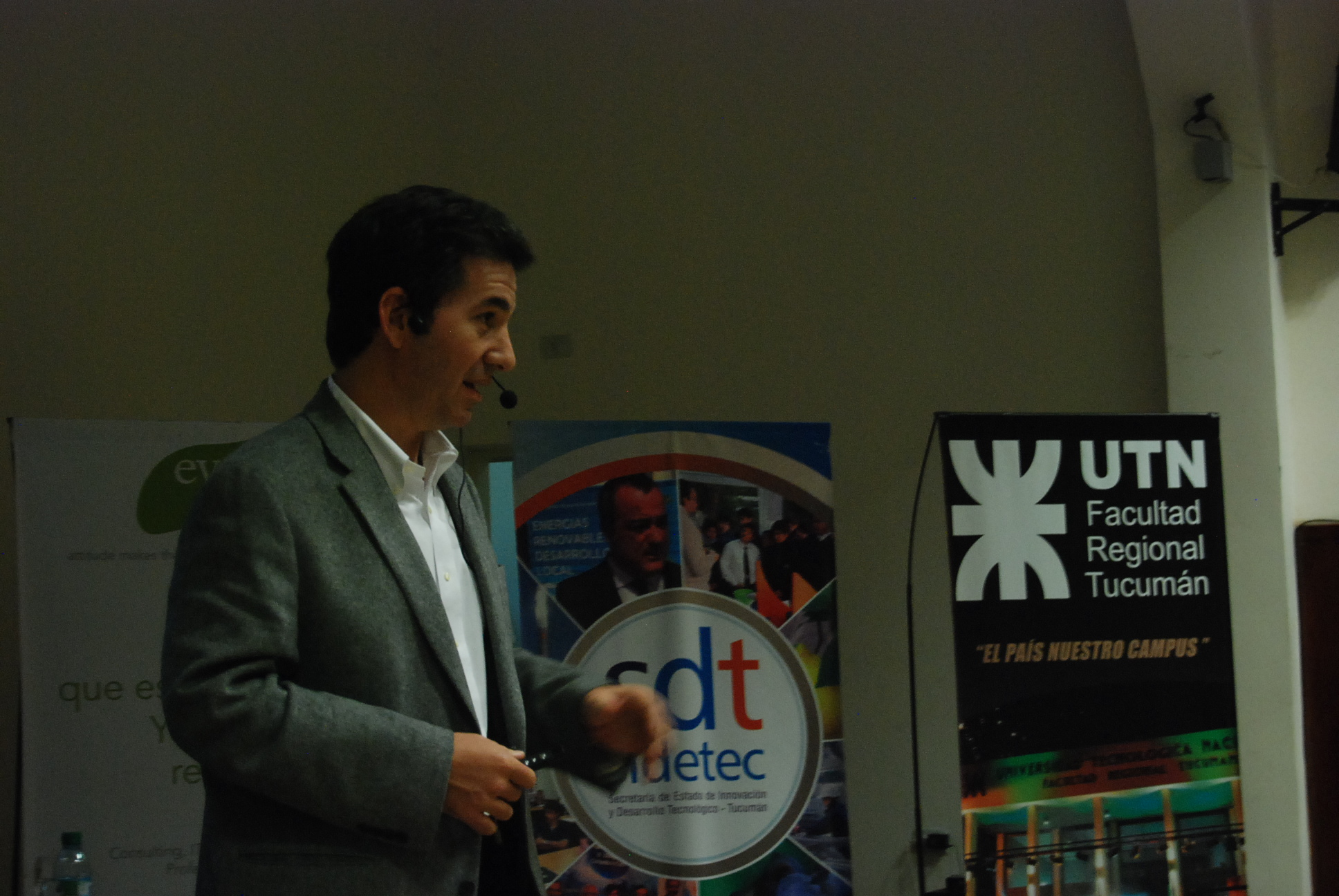
- Freire in 2013
- Born: 14 January 1972 (age 54); Buenos Aires, Argentina
- Occupations: Entrepreneur and consultant
- Known for: Co-founder of Officenet; Minister of Modernization, Innovation and Technology of Buenos Aires (2015–2017)

Andy Freire (Buenos Aires, 14 January 1972) is an entrepreneur, consultant and independent director. He is a co-founder of Officenet (later acquired by Staples) and served as Minister of Modernization, Innovation and Technology of the City of Buenos Aires from 2015 to 2017. He was a managing partner and head of the Southern Cone for the SoftBank Latin America Fund. He is currently linked to Baris, a brand that produces and sells in the United States Patagonian frozen raspberries covered with chocolate, and to Racquet360, a company builder focused on the development of padel in the United States.

== Career ==
He began his career at Procter & Gamble. He was a co-founder and director of Officenet, an office supplies distributor that expanded operations in Argentina and Brazil and was acquired by Staples in 2004; in 2011 it adopted the brand of its parent company. The company’s experience was the subject of the Harvard Business School case study Officenet (A): Making Entrepreneurship Work in Argentina.

After Officenet, he co-founded Axialent, a global consulting and coaching firm oriented to leadership, team effectiveness and culture, where he served as president and CEO until 2011. In 2013 he joined the founding team of Quasar Ventures, a technology company builder reported by The Next Web at launch.

From that ecosystem and other projects, he co-founded or helped launch startups including Restorando (later acquired by TheFork/Tripadvisor) and Sirena (acquired by Zenvia), as well as Trocafone (a refurbished smartphones marketplace based in Brazil). The acquisition of Restorando by TheFork was announced in 2019, and the purchase of Sirena by Zenvia was reported in 2020.

In investing, he was founding managing partner and Head Southern Cone of the SoftBank Latin America Fund. He currently serves as an independent director for public and private companies and focuses on leadership processes, executive coaching, team effectiveness and cultural transformation. He is also linked to Baris (frozen foods based on Patagonian raspberries) and to Racquet360 (a padel company builder in the United States).

== Public service ==
On 10 December 2015 he became Minister of Modernization, Innovation and Technology of the Government of the City of Buenos Aires; during the same administration he presided over the city’s Tourism Authority. In the 2017 legislative elections he joined the Vamos Juntos list for the Buenos Aires City Legislature; official results are published by the city government.

== Academic and media activity ==
He has delivered classes or talks as a guest at universities such as Stanford, MIT, Harvard, Notre Dame, Wharton and IE (Spain). He contributed as an entrepreneurship specialist on CNN en Español and Telefe Noticias; he participates weekly on FM100 and hosted the TV program Un millón para emprender.

== Recognition and affiliations ==
He was selected by the World Economic Forum for its Young Global Leaders community (2008). He has also received other recognitions such as Global Leader for Tomorrow (2000), Latin American Entrepreneur of the Year (Endeavor, 2001) and World Young Business Achiever (2002). He has held roles in organizations such as Endeavor Argentina and YPO Argentina, and in WEF bodies; he was a member of the Harvard Business School Global Advisory Board until 2017.

== Publications ==
- Pasión por emprender: De la idea a la cruda realidad. Aguilar, 2012. ISBN 9789870426059.
- 50 claves para emprendedores. 2007. ISBN 9786071112064.
- El 5%: El 5% de tu tiempo para cambiar el 100% de la vida de alguien que lo necesita (with Julián Weich). Penguin Random House, 2013. ISBN 9789870429401.
- ¡Libre! El camino del emprendedor como filosofía de vida. Aguilar, 2014. ISBN 9789870436553.
- Argentina emprendedora. Penguin Random House, 2015. ISBN 9789877351071.
