= Moraleja del Vino =

Coordinates: 41°28′N 5°39′W

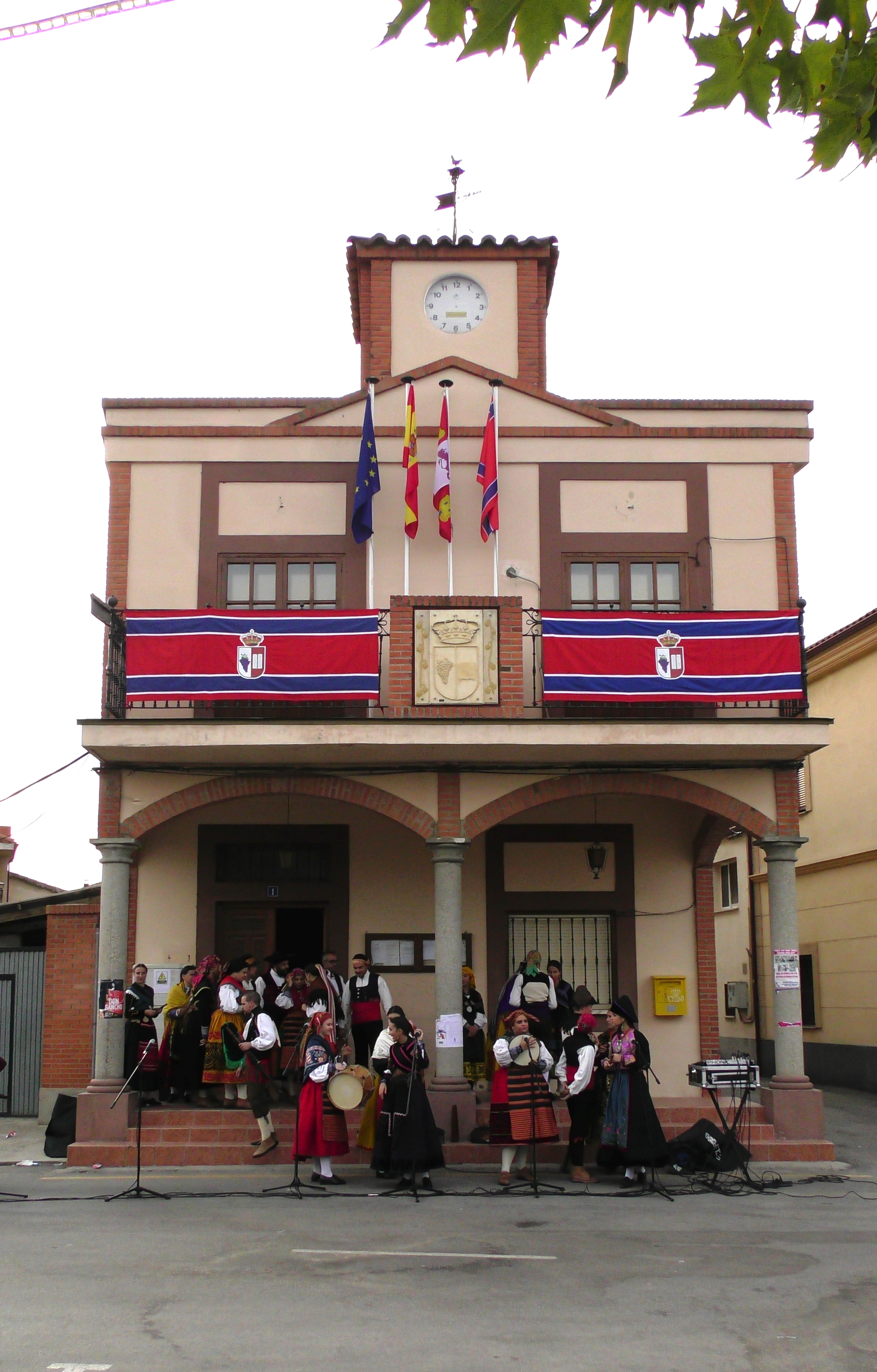

- Flag Coat of arms
- Interactive map of Moraleja del Vino
- Country: Spain
- Autonomous community: Castile and León
- Province: Zamora
- Municipality: Moraleja del Vino

Area
  - Total: 19 km^{2} (7.3 sq mi)

Population (2025-01-01)
  - Total: 1,796
  - Density: 95/km^{2} (240/sq mi)
- Time zone: UTC+1 (CET)
  - Summer (DST): UTC+2 (CEST)
- Website: Official website

Moraleja del Vino is a municipality located in the province of Zamora, Castile and León, Spain. According to the 2004 census (INE), the municipality has a population of 1,315 inhabitants.
