= List of PlayStation 3 games (D–I) =

There are currently 2304 games in this table across all pages: A to C, D to I, J to P, and Q to Z. It does not include PlayStation minis, PS one Classics or PS2 Classics.

Key
3D Stereoscopic 3-D	M PlayStation Move optional M required	SV SimulView	F2P Free-to-play	E PlayStation Eye	D Digital only games

Title	Developer(s)	Release date			Options	Ref.
Title	Developer(s)	JP	PAL	NA	Options	Ref.
Dai-2-Ji Super Robot Taisen OG	Bandai Namco Games	November 29, 2012	Unreleased	Unreleased		
Dai-3-Ji Super Robot Taisen Z Jigoku-hen	Bandai Namco	April 10, 2014	Unreleased	Unreleased		
Dai-3-Ji Super Robot Taisen Z Rengoku-hen (Note: stand-alone expansion for Dai-3-Ji Super Robot Taisen Z Jigoku-hen.)	Bandai Namco	April 2, 2015	Unreleased	Unreleased	D	
Dai-3-Ji Super Robot Taisen Z Tengoku-hen	Bandai Namco	April 2, 2015	Unreleased	Unreleased		
Daikoukai Jidai Online: Cruz del Sur	Koei	April 28, 2009	Unreleased	Unreleased		
Daikoukai Jidai Online: 2nd Age (Note: update for Daikoukai Jidai Online: Cruz del Sur.)	Koei	September 20, 2012	Unreleased	Unreleased		
Daikoukai Jidai Online: El Oriente (Note: update for Daikoukai Jidai Online: Cruz del Sur.)	Koei	December 15, 2009	Unreleased	Unreleased		
Daikoukai Jidai Online: GranAtlas (Note: update for Daikoukai Jidai Online: Cruz del Sur.)	Koei	December 3, 2013	Unreleased	Unreleased	D	
Daikoukai Jidai Online: Tierra Americana (Note: update for Daikoukai Jidai Online: Cruz del Sur.)	Koei	February 22, 2012	Unreleased	Unreleased		
Daisenryaku Perfect: Senjou no Hasha	System Soft	February 6, 2014	Unreleased	Unreleased	D	
Daito Giken Koushiki Pachi-Slot Sumulator Hihouden: Taiyou o Motomeru Monotachi	Paon Corporation	April 25, 2013	Unreleased	Unreleased		
Daisenryaku: Dai Toua Kouboushi – Tora Tora Tora Ware Kishuu Ni Seikou Seri	System Soft	June 20, 2013	Unreleased	Unreleased		
Daisenryaku: Dai Toua Kouboushi 3 - Dai-ni-ji Sekai Taisen Boppatsu! - Suujikugun Tai Rengougun Zensekaisen	SystemSoft	March 26, 2015	Unreleased	Unreleased		
Daisenryaku Exceed II	System Soft	July 30, 2015	Unreleased	Unreleased		
Damage Inc. Pacific Squadron WWII	Trickstar Games	Unreleased	August 28, 2012	August 28, 2012		
Damnation	Blue Omega Entertainment	Unreleased	May 22, 2009	May 26, 2009		
Dance Dance Revolution •Dance Dance Revolution New Moves^{EU}	Konami	Unreleased	March 18, 2011	November 16, 2010	M	
Dance! It's Your Stage	Neopica	Unreleased	September 30, 2011	Unreleased		
Dance Magic	Targem Games	Unreleased	January 8, 2013	Unreleased	D	
Dance on Broadway	Longtail Studios	Unreleased	March 18, 2011^{EU} March 24, 2011^{AU}	March 17, 2011	M	
Dante's Inferno	Visceral Games	February 18, 2010	February 12, 2010	February 9, 2010		
Dare to Fly!	Gameshastra	Unreleased	June 26, 2013	Unreleased	D	
Dark Awake: The King Has No Name	Recom	August 5, 2010	Unreleased	Unreleased	D	
Dark Mist	Game Republic	November 7, 2007	May 15, 2008	Unreleased	D	
Dark Sector	Digital Extremes	March 28, 2008	April 4, 2008	March 25, 2008		
Dark Souls	FromSoftware	September 22, 2011	October 7, 2011	October 4, 2011		
Dark Souls II	FromSoftware	March 13, 2014	March 11, 2014	March 14, 2014		
Dark Void	Airtight Games	Unreleased	January 22, 2010	January 19, 2010		
Darksiders	Vigil Games	March 18, 2010	January 8, 2010	January 5, 2010		
Darksiders II	Vigil Games	Unreleased	August 14, 2012	August 14, 2012		
Darkstalkers Resurrection (Night Warriors: Darkstalkers' Revenge and Darkstalkers 3)	Iron Galaxy	April 17, 2013	March 13, 2013	March 12, 2013		
Date A Live: Arusu Install	Compile Heart	June 26, 2014	Unreleased	Unreleased		
Date A Live: Rinne Utopia	Compile Heart	June 27, 2013	Unreleased	Unreleased		
Datura	Plastic	Unreleased	May 9, 2012	May 8, 2012	D M	
Days of Thunder: Video Game •Days of Thunder: NASCAR Edition^{UNK}	Piranha Games	Unreleased	Unreleased	February 22, 2011		
Daytona USA	Sega	October 26, 2011	November 23, 2011	October 25, 2011	D	
DC Universe Online	Sony Online Entertainment	Unreleased	January 14, 2011	January 11, 2011	F2P	
de Blob 2	Blue Tongue Entertainment	Unreleased	February 25, 2011	February 25, 2011	3D M	
Dead Block	Candygun Games	Unreleased	July 27, 2011	July 19, 2011	D	
Dead Island	Techland	October 20, 2011	September 9, 2011	September 6, 2011		
Dead Island: Riptide (Note: stand-alone expansion for Dead Island.)	Techland	Unreleased	April 26, 2013	April 23, 2013		
Dead Nation	Housemarque	Unreleased	December 1, 2010	November 30, 2010	D	
Dead Rising 2	Blue Castle Games	September 30, 2010	September 24, 2010	September 28, 2010		
Dead Rising 2: Off the Record	Capcom Vancouver	October 13, 2011	October 14, 2011	October 11, 2011		
Dead Space	EA Redwood Shores	Unreleased	October 31, 2008	October 14, 2008		
Dead Space 2	Visceral Games	Unreleased	January 28, 2011	January 25, 2011		
Dead Space 3	Visceral Games	Unreleased	February 8, 2013	February 5, 2013		
Dead Space Extraction HD	Visceral Games; Eurocom	Unreleased	January 26, 2011	January 25, 2011	D M	
Dead Space Ignition	Sumo Digital / Visceral Games	Unreleased	October 13, 2010	October 12, 2010	D	
Deadfall Adventures: Heart of Atlantis	The Farm 51	Unreleased	October 29, 2014	October 28, 2014	D	
Deadliest Catch: Sea of Chaos	DoubleTap Games	Unreleased	Unreleased	November 29, 2010	M	
Deadliest Warrior: Ancient Combat	Pipeworks Software	Unreleased	Unreleased	April 17, 2012		
Deadliest Warrior: Legends	Pipeworks Software	Unreleased	Unreleased	July 26, 2011	D	
Deadliest Warrior: The Game	Pipeworks Software	Unreleased	Unreleased	October 5, 2010	D	
Deadly Premonition: The Director's Cut •Deadly Premonition: Red Seeds Profile: Complete Edition^{JP} (Note: Released originally as Red Seeds Profile in Japan and Deadly Premonition for Microsoft Windows and Xbox 360.)	Access Games	March 13, 2015	April 26, 2013	April 26, 2013	3D M	
Deadpool	High Moon Studios	Unreleased	June 28, 2013	June 25, 2013		
Deadstorm Pirates	Namco Bandai	Unreleased	November 24, 2010	Unreleased	D	
Dead or Alive 5	Team Ninja / Sega AM2	September 27, 2012	September 28, 2012	September 25, 2012		
Dead or Alive 5 Ultimate (Note: update for Dead or Alive 5.)	Team Ninja / Sega AM2	September 5, 2013	September 6, 2013	September 3, 2013		
Dead or Alive 5 Last Round (Note: update for Dead or Alive 5 Ultimate.)	Team Ninja / Sega AM2	February 19, 2015	February 20, 2015	February 24, 2015		
Dead to Rights: Retribution	Volatile Games	July 8, 2010	April 23, 2010	April 27, 2010		
Death Track: Resurrection	Gaijin Entertainment	Unreleased	June 2, 2010	June 8, 2010	D	
Deathmatch Village	Bloober Team	Unreleased	August 7, 2013	September 2, 2013	D F2P	
DeathSpank	Hothead Games	Unreleased	July 14, 2010	July 13, 2010	D	
DeathSpank: Thongs of Virtue	Hothead Games	Unreleased	September 22, 2010	September 20, 2010	D	
Deception IV: Blood Ties	Koei Tecmo Games	February 27, 2014	March 28, 2014	March 25, 2014		
Deception IV: The Nightmare Princess (Note: update for Deception IV: Blood Ties.)	Koei Tecmo	March 26, 2015	Unreleased	Unreleased		
Deep Black	Biart	Unreleased	August 22, 2012	August 21, 2012	D	
Def Jam: Icon	EA Chicago	June 21, 2007	March 23, 2007	March 6, 2007		
Def Jam Rapstar	4mm Games	Unreleased	November 26, 2010	October 5, 2010	E	
Defenders of Ardania	Most Wanted Entertainment	Unreleased	March 6, 2013	Unreleased	D	
Defense Technica	Kuno Interactive	Unreleased	Unreleased	April 22, 2014	D	
Defiance	Trion Worlds; Human Head Studios	Unreleased	April 2, 2013	April 2, 2013	F2P	
Demolition Inc.	Zeroscale	Unreleased	December 12, 2012	Unreleased	D	
Demon's Souls	From Software	February 5, 2009	June 25, 2010	October 6, 2009		
Dengeki Bunko: Fighting Climax	French Bread (game developer)	November 13, 2014	October 6, 2015	October 6, 2015		
Dengeki Bunko: Fighting Climax Ignition (Note: update for Dengeki Bunko: Fighting Climax.)	French Bread (game developer)	December 17, 2015	Unreleased	Unreleased		
Derby Time Online	Japan Studio	November 13, 2008	Unreleased	Unreleased		
Derrick the Deathfin	Different Tuna	Unreleased	October 10, 2012	October 9, 2012	D	
Destiny	Bungie	September 11, 2014	September 9, 2014	September 9, 2014		
Destroy All Humans! Path of the Furon	Sandblast Games	Unreleased	February 13, 2009	Unreleased		
Deus Ex: Human Revolution	Eidos Montréal	October 20, 2011	August 26, 2011	August 23, 2011		
Deus Ex: Human Revolution Director's Cut (Note: update for Deus Ex: Human Revolution.)	Eidos Montréal	Unreleased	October 25, 2013	October 22, 2013		
Devil May Cry 4	Capcom	January 31, 2008	February 8, 2008	February 5, 2008		
Devil May Cry HD Collection	Capcom	March 22, 2012	April 3, 2012	April 3, 2012		
Diablo III	Blizzard Entertainment	September 3, 2013	September 3, 2013	September 3, 2013		
Diablo III: Reaper of Souls (Note: update for Diablo III.)	Blizzard Entertainment	August 19, 2014	August 19, 2014	August 19, 2014		
Digger HD	Creat Studios	Unreleased	October 8, 2009	October 1, 2009	D	
Digimon All-Star Rumble	Prope	Unreleased	November 14, 2013	November 11, 2013		
Diner Dash	GameLab	December 14, 2009	January 14, 2010	November 24, 2009	D	
Dirt 3	Codemasters Birmingham	August 25, 2011	May 24, 2011	May 24, 2011		
Dirt: Showdown	Codemasters Southam	Unreleased	May 25, 2012	June 12, 2012		
Disgaea 3: Absence of Justice	Nippon Ichi	January 31, 2008	February 20, 2009	August 26, 2008		
Disgaea 4: A Promise Unforgotten	Nippon Ichi	February 24, 2011	November 4, 2011	September 6, 2011		
Disgaea D2: A Brighter Darkness	Nippon Ichi	March 20, 2013	September 27, 2013	October 8, 2013		
Dishonored	Arkane Studios	October 11, 2012	October 8, 2012	October 9, 2012		
Disney Infinity	Avalanche Software	Unreleased	August 22, 2013	August 18, 2013		
Disney Infinity 2.0 Edition	Avalanche Software	Unreleased	September 18, 2014	September 23, 2014		
Disney Infinity 3.0	Avalanche Software	November 12, 2015	August 28, 2015	August 30, 2015		
Disney Sing It	Zoë Mode	Unreleased	November 7, 2008	October 14, 2008		
Disney Sing It: Family Hits •Disney Sing It: Filmhits^{EU}	Zoë Mode	Unreleased	October 8, 2010	August 3, 2010		
Disney Sing It! – High School Musical 3: Senior Year	Zoë Mode	Unreleased	November 28, 2008	February 17, 2009		
Disney Sing It: Party Hits •Disney Sing It: Pop Party^{EU}	Zoë Mode	Unreleased	October 12, 2010	October 12, 2010		
Disney Sing It: Pop Hits	Zoë Mode	Unreleased	October 6, 2009	October 6, 2009		
Disney Universe	Eurocom	Unreleased	October 28, 2011	October 28, 2011		
Disorder 6	5pb.	August 22, 2013	Unreleased	Unreleased		
Divekick	Iron Galaxy	September 17, 2014	August 21, 2013	August 20, 2013	D	
DJ Hero	FreeStyleGames	Unreleased	October 29, 2009	October 27, 2009		
DJ Hero 2	FreeStyleGames	Unreleased	October 22, 2010	October 19, 2010		
DmC: Devil May Cry	Ninja Theory	January 17, 2013	January 15, 2013	January 15, 2013		
Do Not Fall	XPEC Entertainment Inc.	Unreleased	July 24, 2013	July 23, 2013	D	
Doc Clock: The Toasted Sandwich of Time	Stickmen Studios	Unreleased	April 18, 2012	May 1, 2012	D	
Doctor Who: The Eternity Clock	Id Software	May 23, 2012	May 23, 2012	May 23, 2012		
Dogfight 1942	CI Games	Unreleased	October 17, 2012	December 18, 2012	D	
Don Bradman Cricket 14	Big Ant Studios	Unreleased	April 11, 2014	Unreleased		
Doki-Doki Universe	HumaNature	February 22, 2014	December 11, 2013	December 10, 2013	D	
Dollar Dash	Candygun Games	Unreleased	March 20, 2013	March 19, 2013	D	
Don't Starve: Giant Edition	Klei Entertainment	Unreleased	June 24, 2015	June 23, 2015	D	
Doodle Devil	JoyBits	Unreleased	March 23, 2016	August 25, 2016	D	
Doodle God	JoyBits	Unreleased	December 24, 2015	July 13, 2016	D	
Doodle Kingdom	JoyBits	Unreleased	April 13, 2016	September 19, 2016	D	
Doom 3 BFG Edition	Id Software	October 16, 2012	October 16, 2012	October 16, 2012	3D	
DOOM Classic Complete	Bethesda Softworks	Unreleased	November 21, 2012	November 20, 2012	D	
Double Dragon Neon	WayForward Technologies	December 12, 2013	Unreleased	September 11, 2012	D	
Dragon Age: Origins	BioWare	January 27, 2011	November 20, 2009	November 3, 2009		
Dragon Age: Origins – Awakening (Note: stand-alone expansion for Dragon Age: Origins (disc version))	BioWare	March 17, 2010	March 18, 2010	March 16, 2010		
Dragon Age II	BioWare	March 30, 2011	March 11, 2011	March 8, 2011		
Dragon Age: Inquisition	BioWare	November 27, 2014	November 21, 2014	November 18, 2014		
Dragon Ball Z Budokai HD Collection	Namco Bandai	Unreleased	November 2, 2012	November 6, 2012		
Dragon Ball Z: Battle of Z	Artdink	January 23, 2014	January 24, 2014	January 28, 2014		
Dragon Ball Z: Burst Limit	Dimps	June 5, 2008	June 6, 2008	June 10, 2008		
Dragon Ball: Raging Blast	Spike	November 9, 2009	November 13, 2009	November 10, 2009		
Dragon Ball: Raging Blast 2	Spike	November 11, 2010	November 5, 2010	November 2, 2010		
Dragon Ball XenoVerse	Dimps	February 5, 2015	February 27, 2015	February 24, 2015		
Dragon Ball Z: Ultimate Tenkaichi	Spike	December 8, 2011	October 28, 2011	October 25, 2011		
Dragon's Crown	Vanillaware	July 25, 2013	August 6, 2013	October 11, 2013		
Dragon's Dogma	Capcom	May 24, 2012	May 25, 2012	May 22, 2012		
Dragon's Dogma Online	Capcom	August 27, 2015	Unreleased	Unreleased		
Dragon's Dogma: Dark Arisen (Note: update for Dragon's Dogma.)	Capcom	April 23, 2013	April 23, 2013	April 23, 2013		
Dragon Fantasy Book I	The Muteki Corporation	Unreleased	June 18, 2014	April 16, 2013	D	
Dragon Fantasy Book II	The Muteki Corporation	Unreleased	Unreleased	September 10, 2013	D	
Dragon Fin Soup	Grimm Bros.	December 2, 2015	November 3, 2015	November 3, 2015	D	
Dragon's Lair	Digital Leisure	Unreleased	February 16, 2011	November 23, 2010	D	
Dragon's Lair II: Time Warp	Digital Leisure	Unreleased	June 29, 2011	June 2, 2011	D	
Dragon Quest Builders	Square Enix	January 28, 2016	Unreleased	Unreleased		
Dragon Quest Heroes II	Square Enix	May 27, 2016	Unreleased	Unreleased		
Dragon Quest Heroes: Yamiryuu to Sekaiju no Shiro	Square Enix	February 26, 2015	Unreleased	Unreleased		
Drakengard 3	Access Games	December 19, 2013	May 21, 2014	May 20, 2014		
Dream Chronicles	KatGames	October 28, 2010	January 5, 2011	November 23, 2010	D	
Dream C Club Gogo.	D3Publisher	April 10, 2014	Unreleased	Unreleased		
Dream C Club: Complete Edipyon!	D3Publisher	November 15, 2012	Unreleased	Unreleased		
Dream C Club Zero	D3Publisher	January 27, 2011	Unreleased	Unreleased		
DreamWorks Super Star Kartz	High Impact Games	Unreleased	November 18, 2011	November 15, 2011		
dress	SCEI	January 14, 2009	Unreleased	Unreleased	D	
Driver: San Francisco	Ubisoft Reflections	September 2, 2011	September 2, 2011	September 6, 2011		
Droplitz	Blitz Arcade	Unreleased	August 13, 2009	June 25, 2009	D	
Duck Dynasty	Fun Labs	Unreleased	Unreleased	October 14, 2014		
DuckTales: Remastered	WayForward Technologies	Unreleased	August 13, 2013	August 13, 2013		
Duke Nukem Forever	3D Realms / Triptych Games / Gearbox Software / Piranha Games	Unreleased	June 10, 2011	June 14, 2011		
Duke Nukem 3D Megaton Edition	Devolver Digital	Unreleased	January 7, 2015	January 6, 2015	D	
Dungeon Defenders	Trendy Entertainment	Unreleased	December 21, 2011	October 18, 2011	D 3D M	
Dungeon Hunter: Alliance	Gameloft	September 13, 2011	April 6, 2011	April 12, 2011	D M	
Dungeon Twister	Hydravision Entertainment	Unreleased	July 4, 2012	July 3, 2012	D	
Dungeons & Dragons: Chronicles of Mystara (Dungeons & Dragons: Shadow over Mystara, Dungeons & Dragons: Tower of Doom)	Capcom	August 22, 2013	June 19, 2013	June 18, 2013		
Dungeons & Dragons: Daggerdale	Bedlam Games	Unreleased	July 11, 2012	May 22, 2012	D	
Dunamis 15	5pb.	September 15, 2011	Unreleased	Unreleased		
Dungeon Siege III	Obsidian Entertainment	July 28, 2011	June 17, 2011	June 21, 2011		
Dust 514	CCP Games	May 14, 2013	May 14, 2013	May 14, 2013	D F2P M	
Dustforce	Hitbox Team	Unreleased	February 5, 2014	February 4, 2014	D	
Dyad	Right Square Bracket Left Square Bracket Games	Unreleased	November 7, 2012	July 17, 2012	D	
Dynasty Warriors: Godseekers	Omega Force	October 3, 2016	Unreleased	Unreleased		
Dynasty Warriors 6	Omega Force	November 11, 2007	March 7, 2008	February 19, 2008		
Dynasty Warriors 6 Empires (Note: stand-alone expansion for Dynasty Warriors 6.)	Omega Force	May 28, 2009	June 26, 2009	June 23, 2009		
Dynasty Warriors 7	Omega Force	March 10, 2011	March 25, 2011	March 22, 2011	3D	
Dynasty Warriors 7: Xtreme Legends (Note: stand-alone expansion for Dynasty Warriors 7.)	Omega Force	September 29, 2011	November 18, 2011	November 15, 2011		
Dynasty Warriors 7 Empires (Note: stand-alone expansion for Dynasty Warriors 7.)	Omega Force	November 8, 2012	February 22, 2013	February 26, 2013		
Dynasty Warriors 8	Omega Force	February 28, 2013	July 19, 2013	July 16, 2013		
Dynasty Warriors 8: Empires (Note: stand-alone expansion for Dynasty Warriors 8.)	Omega Force	February 24, 2015	February 24, 2015	February 24, 2015	D	
Dynasty Warriors 8: Xtreme Legends (Note: stand-alone expansion for Dynasty Warriors 8.) •Dynasty warriors 7: XL^{Asia}	Omega Force	January 22, 2014	April 4, 2014	April 4, 2014		
Dynasty Warriors: Gundam	Omega Force	March 1, 2007	November 9, 2007	August 28, 2007		
Dynasty Warriors: Gundam 2	Omega Force	December 18, 2008	April 24, 2009	April 21, 2009		
Dynasty Warriors: Gundam 3	Omega Force	December 16, 2010	July 1, 2011	June 28, 2011		
Dynasty Warriors: Gundam Reborn	Omega Force	December 19, 2013	June 27, 2014	July 1, 2014		
Dynasty Warriors Online •Shin Sangoku Musou Online: Kamishou Ranbu^{JP}	Koei Tecmo	February 18, 2010	Unreleased	Unreleased		
Dynasty Warriors: Strikeforce	Blue Omega Entertainment	Unreleased	May 22, 2009	May 26, 2009		
Dynasty Warriors: Strikeforce 2 HD Edition (Multi Raid 2)	Omega Force	July 26, 2010	Unreleased	Unreleased		
E.X. Troopers	Capcom / HexaDrive	November 22, 2012	Unreleased	Unreleased		
Earth Defense Force 2025	Sandlot	July 4, 2013	March 21, 2014	February 8, 2014		
Earth Defense Force: Insect Armageddon	Sandlot	July 7, 2011	July 22, 2011	July 5, 2011		
Earthworm Jim HD	Gameloft	February 1, 2011	July 28, 2010	August 3, 2010	D	
EA Sports Active 2	EA Tiburon	Unreleased	November 19, 2010	November 16, 2010		
EA Sports MMA	EA Tiburon	October 22, 2010	October 22, 2010	October 19, 2010	E	
Eat Lead: The Return of Matt Hazard	Vicious Cycle Software	February 18, 2010	March 6, 2009	February 26, 2009		
Eat Them!	FluffyLogic	July 20, 2011	December 22, 2010	December 21, 2010	D	
Echochrome	Japan Studio	March 19, 2008	July 10, 2008	May 1, 2008	D	
Echochrome II	Japan Studio	December 23, 2010	December 22, 2010	December 21, 2010	M	
Eiyuu Senki: The World Conquest	Tenco	November 24, 2015	Unreleased	Unreleased		
El Chavo Kart	Effecto Studios / Slang	Unreleased	Unreleased	February 21, 2014		
El Shaddai: Ascension of the Metatron	Ignition Tokyo	April 28, 2011	September 9, 2011	August 16, 2011		
Elefunk	8bit Games	July 10, 2008	July 17, 2008	July 17, 2008	D	
Elemental Monster: Online Card Game	Hudson Soft	December 22, 2010	September 28, 2011	September 13, 2011	D	
Elevator Action Deluxe	Square Enix	August 31, 2011	August 31, 2011	August 30, 2011	D	
The Elder Scrolls IV: Oblivion •The Elder Scrolls IV: Oblivion (Game of the Year edition)	Bethesda Game Studios	September 27, 2007	April 27, 2007	March 20, 2007		
The Elder Scrolls IV: Shivering Isles (Note: DLC for The Elder Scrolls IV: Oblivion.)	Bethesda Game Studios	Unreleased	Unreleased	November 20, 2007		
The Elder Scrolls V: Skyrim •The Elder Scrolls V: Skyrim (Legendary Edition)	Bethesda Game Studios	December 8, 2011	November 11, 2011	November 11, 2011		
Enchanted Arms	From Software	January 25, 2007	March 23, 2007	April 3, 2007		
Enemy Front	CI Games	Unreleased	June 10, 2014	June 10, 2014		
Enemy Territory: Quake Wars	Splash Damage / Underground Development	June 26, 2008	May 30, 2008	May 27, 2008		
Enslaved: Odyssey to the West	Ninja Theory	October 7, 2010	October 8, 2010	October 5, 2010	3D	
Entwined	Pixelopus	July 24, 2014	July 23, 2014	July 22, 2014	D	
Epic Mickey 2: The Power of Two	Junction Point Studios	November 19, 2012	November 23, 2012	November 23, 2012	3D M	
Escape Dead Island	Fatshark	Unreleased	November 21, 2014	November 18, 2014		
Eternal Sonata	tri-Crescendo	September 18, 2008	November 28, 2008	October 21, 2008		
Ethan: Meteor Hunter	Seaven Studio	Unreleased	October 23, 2013	October 22, 2013	D	
Eufloria	Omni Systems	Unreleased	October 5, 2011	October 4, 2011	D	
Eureka Seven AO: Jungfrau no Hanabanatachi	Bandai Namco Games	September 20, 2012	Unreleased	Unreleased		
Everybody Dance •DanceStar Party^{EU}	London Studio	Unreleased	October 21, 2011	October 18, 2011	M	
Everybody Dance 2 •DanceStar Party Hits^{EU}	London Studio	Unreleased	October 12, 2012	November 27, 2012^{Latin America}		
Everybody Dance 3^{Latin America}	London Studio	Unreleased	Unreleased	2013^{Latin America}	M	
Everybody Dance Digital •DanceStar Digital^{EU}	London Studio	Unreleased	September 4, 2013	February 12, 2013	M D F2P	
Hot Shots Golf: Out of Bounds •Everybody's Golf 5^{JP} •Everybody's Golf: World Tour^{EU}	Clap Hanz	July 26, 2007	March 26, 2008	March 18, 2008	3D	
Everyday Shooter	Queasy Games	May 15, 2008	February 14, 2008	October 11, 2007	D	
Everyone Sing	O-Games	Unreleased	September 4, 2012	September 4, 2012		
Explodemon	Curve Studios	Unreleased	February 9, 2011	February 8, 2011	D	
Extreme Exorcism	Golden Ruby Games	Unreleased	September 23, 2015	September 23, 2015	D	
EyeCreate (app)	London Studio	Unreleased	October 26, 2007	October 23, 2007	E	
The Eye of Judgment	Japan Studio	October 25, 2007	October 26, 2007	October 23, 2007	E	
EyePet	London Studio	Unreleased	October 23, 2009	September 5, 2010	3D M E	
EyePet & Friends	London Studio	May 2, 2013	November 18, 2011	November 18, 2011	3D M E	
EyePet: Move Edition (Note: update for EyePet.)	SCEE London Studio	October 21, 2010	September 5, 2010	September 5, 2010		
F.E.A.R.	Monolith Productions / Day 1 Studios	Unreleased	April 20, 2007	April 24, 2007		
F.E.A.R. 2: Project Origin	Monolith Productions	August 27, 2009	February 13, 2009	February 10, 2009		
F.E.A.R. 3	Day 1 Studios	July 21, 2011	June 24, 2011	June 21, 2011		
F1 2010	Codemasters Birmingham	October 7, 2010	September 24, 2010	September 22, 2010		
F1 2011	Codemasters	October 7, 2011	September 23, 2011	September 20, 2011		
F1 2012	Codemasters	September 20, 2012	September 22, 2012	September 18, 2012		
F1 2013	Codemasters	October 4, 2013	October 4, 2013	October 4, 2013		
F1 2014	Codemasters	October 2, 2014	October 17, 2014	October 21, 2014		
F1 Race Stars	Codemasters	March 7, 2013	November 16, 2012	November 16, 2012		
FaceBreaker	EA Canada	October 16, 2008	September 5, 2008	September 3, 2008	E	
Faery: Legends of Avalon	Spiders	Unreleased	January 12, 2011	January 11, 2011	D	
Fairy Fencer F	Compile Heart	October 10, 2013	September 19, 2014	September 16, 2014		
Fairytale Fights	Playlogic Game Factory	Unreleased	October 23, 2009	October 27, 2009		
Falling Skies: The Game	Little Orbit	November 4, 2010	October 17, 2014	September 30, 2014		
Fallout 3	Bethesda Game Studios	January 15, 2009	October 31, 2008	October 28, 2008		
Fallout: New Vegas	Bethesda Game Studios	November 4, 2010	October 22, 2010	October 19, 2010		
Family Feud	Virtuos	Unreleased	Unreleased	July 6, 2010	D	
Family Feud Decades	Virtuos	Unreleased	Unreleased	December 13, 2011	D	
Family Guy: Back to the Multiverse	Heavy Iron Studios	Unreleased	November 23, 2012	November 20, 2012		
Fantastic Four: Rise of the Silver Surfer	7 Studios / Visual Concepts	Unreleased	June 15, 2007	June 15, 2007		
Far Cry 2	Ubisoft Montreal	December 25, 2008	October 24, 2008	October 21, 2008		
Far Cry 3	Ubisoft Montreal	Unreleased	September 6, 2012	September 4, 2012		
Far Cry 3: Blood Dragon (Note: stand-alone expansion for Far Cry 3.)	Ubisoft Montreal	Unreleased	May 1, 2013	April 30, 2013	D	
Far Cry 4	Ubisoft Montreal	November 18, 2014	November 18, 2014	November 18, 2014		
Far Cry Classic	Crytek	Unreleased	February 12, 2014	February 11, 2014	D	
Farming Simulator 13	Giants Software	September 10, 2013	September 10, 2013	September 10, 2013		
Farming Simulator 15	Giants Software	May 19, 2015	May 19, 2015	May 19, 2015		
Fast and Furious: Showdown	Firebrand Games	Unreleased	May 24, 2013	May 21, 2013		
Fast Draw Showdown	Digital Leisure	Unreleased	Unreleased	July 22, 2011	D M	
Fat Princess	Titan Studios	December 25, 2009	July 30, 2009	July 30, 2009	D	
Fatal Inertia EX	Koei Canada	May 29, 2008	July 15, 2008	June 19, 2008	D	
Ferrari Challenge: Trofeo Pirelli	Eutechnyx	Unreleased	July 11, 2008	August 26, 2008		
Feeding Frenzy 2: Shipwreck Showdown	PopCap Games	Unreleased	May 5, 2010	March 11, 2010	D	
Ferrari: The Race Experience (Note: update for Ferrari Challenge: Trofeo Pirelli.)	Eutechnyx	Unreleased	October 6, 2010	September 13, 2011		
Fez	Polytron Corporation	August 20, 2014	March 26, 2014	March 25, 2014	D	
Fibbage	Jackbox Games	Unreleased	Unreleased	September 16, 2014	D	
FIFA 08	EA Canada	December 20, 2007	September 28, 2007	October 16, 2007		
FIFA 09	EA Canada	December 18, 2008	October 3, 2008	October 14, 2008		
FIFA 10	EA Canada	October 22, 2009	October 2, 2009	October 20, 2009		
FIFA 11	EA Canada	September 30, 2010	October 1, 2010	September 28, 2010		
FIFA 12	EA Canada	Unreleased	September 30, 2011	September 27, 2011		
FIFA 13	EA Canada	October 18, 2012	September 28, 2012	September 25, 2012	M	
FIFA 14	EA Canada	September 27, 2013	September 27, 2013	September 24, 2013	M	
FIFA 15	EA Canada	September 26, 2014	September 26, 2014	September 26, 2014		
FIFA 16	EA Canada	October 8, 2015	September 24, 2015	September 22, 2015		
FIFA 17	EA Canada	September 29, 2016	September 29, 2016	September 27, 2016		
FIFA 18	EA Canada	September 29, 2017	September 29, 2017	September 29, 2017		
FIFA 19	EA Canada	September 28, 2018	September 28, 2018	September 28, 2018		
FIFA Street	EA Canada	Unreleased	March 16, 2012	March 13, 2012		
FIFA Street 3	EA Canada	June 5, 2008	February 22, 2008	February 18, 2008		
The Fight: Lights Out	ColdWood Interactive	November 18, 2010	November 5, 2010	November 9, 2010	3D M E	
Fight Night Champion	EA Canada	March 10, 2011	March 4, 2011	March 1, 2011	E	
Fight Night Round 3	EA Canada / EA Chicago	March 15, 2007	March 23, 2007	December 5, 2006		
Fight Night Round 4	EA Canada	January 28, 2010	June 26, 2009	June 23, 2009	E	
Fighting Vipers	Sega	November 28, 2012	December 5, 2012	November 27, 2012	D	
Final Exam	Mighty Rocket Studio	March 4, 2014	November 6, 2013	November 5, 2013	D	
Final Fantasy X/X-2 HD Remaster	Square Enix	December 26, 2013	March 21, 2014	March 18, 2014		
Final Fantasy XIII	Square Enix	December 17, 2009	March 9, 2010	March 9, 2010		
Final Fantasy XIII-2	Square Enix	December 15, 2011	February 3, 2012	January 31, 2012		
Final Fantasy XIV: A Realm Reborn	Square Enix	August 27, 2013	August 27, 2013	August 27, 2013		
Final Fight: Double Impact (Final Fight, Magic Sword)	Capcom	Unreleased	April 15, 2010	April 15, 2010	D	
Fireburst	exDream	Unreleased	April 16, 2010	Unreleased	D	
Fist of the North Star: Ken's Rage	Koei	March 25, 2010	November 5, 2010	November 2, 2010		
Fist of the North Star: Ken's Rage 2	Koei	December 20, 2012	February 8, 2013	February 5, 2013		
Fit in Six	Ubisoft	Unreleased	July 28, 2011	March 15, 2011		
Flashback	VectorCell	October 2, 2013	October 2, 2013	October 1, 2013	D	
Flight Control HD	Firemint	October 21, 2010	September 15, 2010	Unreleased	D 3D M	
Flock!	Proper Games	Unreleased	April 9, 2009	April 9, 2009	D	
flOw	ThatGameCompany	May 11, 2007	March 30, 2007	February 22, 2007	D	
flower	ThatGameCompany	February 12, 2009	February 12, 2009	February 12, 2009	D	
Folklore	Game Republic	June 21, 2007	October 12, 2007	October 9, 2007		
Foosball 2012	Grip Digital	Unreleased	July 25, 2012	July 24, 2012	D	
Forest Legends: The Call of Love	Alawar	Unreleased	January 22, 2014	February 18, 2014	D	
Formula One Championship Edition	Studio Liverpool	December 28, 2006	March 23, 2007	March 14, 2007		
Fracture	Day 1 Studios	October 30, 2008	October 10, 2008	October 7, 2008		
Free Realms	Sony Online Entertainment	Unreleased	March 29, 2011	March 29, 2011	D	
Fret Nice	Tecmo	Unreleased	May 26, 2010	February 4, 2010	D	
Fritz Chess	Deep Silver	Unreleased	July 31, 2009	Unreleased		
Frogger Returns	Hijinx Studios	April 15, 2010	February 11, 2010	December 10, 2009	D	
Frogger: Hyper Arcade Edition	Zombie Studios	Unreleased	July 11, 2012	July 10, 2012	D	
From Dust	Ubisoft Montpellier	Unreleased	September 14, 2011	September 13, 2011	D	
Front Mission Evolved	Double Helix Games	September 16, 2010	October 8, 2010	September 28, 2010		
Frozen Free Fall: Snowball Fight	SuperVillain Studios	Unreleased	September 15, 2015	September 15, 2015	D	
Frozen Synapse Prime	Double Eleven	December 3, 2014	November 5, 2014	November 4, 2014	D	
Fuel	Asobo Studio	September 17, 2009	June 5, 2009	June 2, 2009		
Fuel Overdose	I-FRIQIYA	Unreleased	December 21, 2012	March 5, 2013	D	
Funky Lab Rat	Hydravision Entertainment	Unreleased	November 24, 2010	November 30, 2010	D M	
Full Auto 2: Battlelines	Pseudo Interactive	Unreleased	March 23, 2007	December 12, 2006		
Furmins	Housemarque	Unreleased	November 20, 2013	Unreleased	D	
Fuse	Insomniac Games	May 28, 2013	May 28, 2013	May 28, 2013		
G1 Jockey 4 2007	Koei	November 1, 2007	Unreleased	Unreleased		
G1 Jockey 4 2008	Koei	September 18, 2008	September 26, 2008	Unreleased		
Gal Gun	Inti Creates	February 23, 2012	Unreleased	Unreleased	M	
Galaga Legions DX	Bandai Namco Entertainment	August 3, 2011	August 3, 2011	August 2, 2011	D	
Game of Thrones	Cyanide	June 8, 2012	June 8, 2012	June 8, 2012		
Game of Thrones	Telltale Games	Unreleased	December 3, 2014	December 9, 2014		
Gatling Gears	Vanguard Games	July 29, 2014	June 29, 2011	June 28, 2011	D	
Gauntlet II	Sony Online Entertainment	Unreleased	June 29, 2007	May 3, 2007	D	
Gekiatsu!! Pachi Game Damashi Max: Evangelion 7 x Seimei no Kodou	Fields	September 6, 2013	Unreleased	Unreleased		
Gekiatsu!! Pachi Game Tamashi Vol. 2: CR Evangelion - Shinjitsu no Tsubasa	Fields	June 9, 2011	Unreleased	Unreleased		
Gekiatsu!! Pachi Game Tamashi: CR Evangelion - Hajimari no Fukuin	Fields	November 18, 2010	Unreleased	Unreleased		
Gekijouban Macross F: 30th d Shudisuta b Box - Hybrid Pack	Bandai Namco	May 15, 2014	Unreleased	Unreleased		
Gekijouban Macross F: Itsuwarino Utahime - Hybrid Pack	Bandai Namco	October 7, 2010	Unreleased	Unreleased		
Gekijouban Macross F: Sayonara no Tsubasa - Hybrid Pack	Bandai Namco	October 20, 2011	Unreleased	Unreleased		
Gendai Daisenryaku 2016: Chitsujo no Houkai - Haken Kokka Shittsui	SystemSoft Alpha	April 28, 2016	Unreleased	Unreleased		
Generator Rex: Agent of Providence	Virtuos	Unreleased	November 4, 2011	November 4, 2011		
Genji: Days of the Blade	Game Republic	November 11, 2006	March 23, 2007	November 17, 2006		
Geometry Wars 3: Dimensions	Lucid Games	Unreleased	November 26, 2014	November 25, 2014	D	
Geometry Wars 3: Dimensions Evolved (Note: update for Geometry Wars 3: Dimensions.)	Lucid Games	Unreleased	November 26, 2014	March 31, 2015	D	
Geon	Strawdog Studios	Unreleased	October 2, 2008	September 25, 2008	D	
Germinator	Creat Studios	Unreleased	February 13, 2013	March 5, 2013	D	
Get Fit With Mel B	Lightning Fish	Unreleased	November 26, 2010	October 20, 2010	M	
Get Up and Dance	O-Games	Unreleased	November 4, 2011	November 4, 2011		
Germany's Next Top Model 2011	dtp entertainment AG	Unreleased	March 18, 2011	Unreleased		
G-Force	Eurocom	Unreleased	July 31, 2009	July 21, 2009		
Ghostbusters: Sanctum of Slime	Behaviour Interactive	Unreleased	March 30, 2011	March 22, 2011	D	
Ghostbusters: The Video Game	Terminal Reality / Threewave Software	Unreleased	June 19, 2009	June 16, 2009		
Giana Sisters: Twisted Dreams	Black Forest Games	October 31, 2013	June 19, 2013	June 18, 2013	D	
Ginsei Igo 2: Next Generation	Magnolia	December 12, 2013	Unreleased	Unreleased		
Girl Fight	Kung Fu Factory	Unreleased	October 2, 2013	September 24, 2013	D	
G.I. Joe: The Rise of Cobra	Double Helix Games	Unreleased	August 7, 2009	August 4, 2009		
Gladiator VS	Acquire	November 23, 2011	Unreleased	Unreleased		
Go! Sports Ski	Yuke's	September 28, 2007	November 1, 2007	October 4, 2007	D	
Go! Puzzle	Cohort Studios	September 6, 2007	June 1, 2007	June 14, 2007	D	
Go! Sports Skydiving	SystemSoft Alpha	January 10, 2008	February 7, 2008	February 7, 2008	D	
Go! Sudoku	Sumo Digital	December 20, 2006	April 24, 2007	December 7, 2006	D	
Goat Simulator	Double Eleven	October 7, 2015	August 12, 2015	August 11, 2015	D	
The Godfather: The Don's Edition	EA Redwood Shores	October 11, 2007	April 20, 2007	March 21, 2007		
The Godfather II	EA Redwood Shores	April 16, 2009	April 10, 2009	April 7, 2009		
God Mode	Old School Games	Unreleased	April 24, 2013	April 23, 2013	D	
God of War HD	Bluepoint Games	April 21, 2011	November 3, 2010	November 2, 2010	D	
God of War II HD	Bluepoint Games	April 21, 2011	November 3, 2010	November 2, 2010	D	
God of War III	Santa Monica Studio	March 25, 2010	March 19, 2010	March 16, 2010		
God of War: Ascension	Santa Monica Studio	Unreleased	March 13, 2013	March 12, 2013		
God of War: Chains of Olympus	Ready at Dawn	October 6, 2011	September 14, 2011	September 13, 2011	D 3D	
God of War: Ghost of Sparta	Ready at Dawn	October 6, 2011	September 14, 2011	September 13, 2011	D 3D	
Godzilla (2014 video game)	Natsume Atari	December 18, 2014	July 17, 2015	July 14, 2015		
Golden Axe	Sega	July 28, 2011	July 20, 2011	July 26, 2011	D	
Golden Axe: Beast Rider	Secret Level, Inc.	Unreleased	October 17, 2008	October 14, 2008		
GoldenEye 007: Reloaded	Eurocom	Unreleased	November 4, 2011	November 1, 2011	M	
The Golden Compass	Shiny Entertainment	March 27, 2008	December 5, 2007	December 7, 2007		
Goosebumps: The Game	WayForward Technologies	Unreleased	Unreleased	October 13, 2015	D	
Gotham City Impostors	Monolith Productions	Unreleased	December 8, 2012	February 7, 2012	D	
Gran Turismo 5	Polyphony Digital	November 25, 2010	November 24, 2010	November 24, 2010	3D SV M E	
Gran Turismo 5 Prologue	Polyphony Digital	December 13, 2007	March 28, 2008	April 15, 2008		
Gran Turismo 5 Prologue Spec III (Note: update for Gran Turismo 5 Prologue.)	Polyphony Digital	October 30, 2008	Unreleased	Unreleased		
Gran Turismo 6	Polyphony Digital	December 5, 2013	December 6, 2013	December 6, 2013	3D	
Grand Slam Tennis 2	EA Canada	Unreleased	February 10, 2012	February 14, 2012	M	
Grand Theft Auto IV	Rockstar North	October 30, 2008	April 29, 2008	April 29, 2008		
Grand Theft Auto V	Rockstar North	October 10, 2013	September 17, 2013	September 17, 2013		
Grand Theft Auto: Episodes from Liberty City (Note: stand-alone expansion for Grand Theft Auto IV.)	Rockstar North	Unreleased	April 16, 2010	April 13, 2010		
Grand Theft Auto: San Andreas	War Drum Studios	December 1, 2015	December 1, 2015	December 1, 2015		
Gravity Crash	Just Add Water	December 24, 2009	November 24, 2009	November 24, 2009	D	
Grease Dance	Zoë Mode	Unreleased	November 4, 2011	October 25, 2011		
Greed Corp	W!Games	August 19, 2010	February 25, 2010	February 25, 2010	D	
Green Day: Rock Band	Harmonix / Demiurge Studios	June 10, 2010	June 11, 2010	June 8, 2010		
Green Lantern: Rise of the Manhunters	Double Helix Games	Unreleased	June 10, 2011	June 25, 2011	3D	
Greg Hastings Paintball 2	Super X Studios	Unreleased	June 14, 2011	June 14, 2011		
GRID Autosport	Codemasters	Unreleased	June 27, 2014	June 24, 2014		
GripShift	Sidhe Interactive	Unreleased	March 23, 2007	January 4, 2007	D	
Groovin' Blocks	Empty Clip Studios	Unreleased	July 7, 2010	March 18, 2010	D	
GTI Club+: Rally Côte d'Azur	Sumo Digital	February 25, 2010	December 4, 2008	January 15, 2009	D E	
Guacamelee!	DrinkBox Studios	March 27, 2014	April 10, 2013	April 9, 2013	D	
Guardians of Middle-Earth	Monolith Productions	December 4, 2012	December 4, 2012	December 4, 2012	D	
The Guided Fate Paradox	Nippon Ichi Software, Inc.	January 24, 2013	October 28, 2013	November 5, 2013		
Guilty Gear XX Λ Core Plus	Arc System Works	November 1, 2012	Unreleased	December 4, 2012	D	
Guilty Gear Xrd -REVELATOR- (Note: update for Guilty Gear Xrd -SIGN-.)	Arc System Works	May 26, 2016	June 10, 2016	June 7, 2016		
Guilty Gear Xrd -SIGN-	Arc System Works	December 4, 2014	June 3, 2015	December 23, 2014		
Guilty Gear Xrd: Rev 2 (Note: DLC for Guilty Gear Xrd -REVELATOR-.)	Arc System Works	Unreleased	May 26, 2017	May 26, 2017	D	
Guitar Hero III: Legends of Rock	Neversoft	October 9, 2008	November 23, 2007	October 29, 2007		
Guitar Hero 5	Neversoft	Unreleased	September 11, 2009	September 1, 2009		
Guitar Hero: Aerosmith	Neversoft	October 9, 2008	June 27, 2008	June 29, 2008		
Guitar Hero: Live	FreeStyleGames	Unreleased	October 23, 2015	October 20, 2015		
Guitar Hero: Metallica	Neversoft	Unreleased	May 29, 2009	March 29, 2009		
Guitar Hero Smash Hits	Beenox	Unreleased	June 26, 2009	June 16, 2009		
Guitar Hero: Van Halen	Underground Development / Neversoft / Budcat Creations	Unreleased	February 19, 2010	December 22, 2009		
Guitar Hero: Warriors of Rock	Neversoft	Unreleased	September 24, 2010	September 28, 2010		
Guitar Hero World Tour	Neversoft	Unreleased	November 7, 2008	October 26, 2008		
Gundam Battle Operation NEXT	Bandai Namco Entertainment	August 27, 2015	Unreleased	Unreleased	D	
Gundam Breaker	Bandai Namco Games	June 27, 2013	Unreleased	Unreleased		
Gundam Breaker 2	Bandai Namco Games	December 18, 2014	Unreleased	Unreleased		
GundeadliGne	Rockin' Android	Unreleased	August 4, 2010	June 15, 2010	D	
Gundemonium Recollection	Rockin' Android	Unreleased	August 4, 2010	June 15, 2010	D	
Gunstar Heroes	Treasure	Unreleased	June 11, 2009	June 11, 2009	D	
Hail to the Chimp	Wideload Games	Unreleased	October 17, 2008	July 1, 2008		
Hajime no Ippo: The Fighting!	Bandai Namco Games	December 11, 2014	Unreleased	Unreleased		
Hakuoki: Stories of the Shinsengumi	Design Factory	June 17, 2010	Unreleased	May 6, 2014		
Hakuouki: Reimeiroku Nagorigusa	Idea Factory	June 28, 2012	Unreleased	Unreleased		
Hamilton's Great Adventure	Fatshark	Unreleased	August 24, 2011	August 23, 2011	D	
Hamsterball	TikGames	Unreleased	April 22, 2010	March 25, 2010	D	
Hanasaku Manimani	5pb.	November 21, 2013	Unreleased	Unreleased		
Handball 16	EKO Software	Unreleased	November 30, 2015	November 30, 2015		
Handball 17	EKO Software	Unreleased	November 11, 2016	November 11, 2016		
Hannah Montana: The Movie	n-Space	Unreleased	May 8, 2009	April 7, 2009		
Happy Feet Two	KMM Games	Unreleased	November 11, 2011	November 8, 2011		
Hard Corps: Uprising	Arc System Works	March 15, 2011	March 23, 2011	March 15, 2011	D	
Harem Tengoku da to Omottara Yandere Jigoku Datta	Nippon Ichi Software	April 24, 2014	Unreleased	Unreleased		
Harry Potter and the Deathly Hallows: Part I	EA Bright Light Studio	Unreleased	November 19, 2010	November 16, 2010		
Harry Potter and the Deathly Hallows: Part II	EA Bright Light Studio	Unreleased	July 15, 2011	July 12, 2011	M	
Harry Potter and the Half-Blood Prince	EA Bright Light Studio	Unreleased	July 3, 2009	June 30, 2009		
Harry Potter and the Order of the Phoenix	EA UK	November 22, 2007	June 28, 2007	June 25, 2007		
Hasbro Family Game Night	EA Bright Light	Unreleased	October 29, 2009	October 29, 2009	D	
Hasbro Family Game Night 3	EA Bright Light	Unreleased	October 26, 2010	October 26, 2010		
Hasbro Family Game Night 4: The Game Show	Wahoo Studios/EA Salt Lake	Unreleased	November 1, 2011	November 1, 2011		
Hatsune Miku: Project DIVA F	Crypton Future Media	March 3, 2013	September 4, 2013	August 27, 2013	3D	
Hatsune Miku: Project DIVA Dreamy Theater (Note: DLC for Hatsune Miku: Project DIVA.)	Sega	June 24, 2010	Unreleased	Unreleased	D	
Hatsune Miku: Project DIVA Dreamy Theater 2nd (Note: DLC for Hatsune Miku: Project DIVA 2nd.)	Sega	August 4, 2011	Unreleased	Unreleased	D	
Hatsune Miku: Project DIVA Dreamy Theater Extend (Note: DLC for Hatsune Miku: Project DIVA Extend.)	Sega	September 13, 2012	Unreleased	Unreleased	D	
Hatsune Miku: Project DIVA F 2nd	Crypton Future Media	March 27, 2013	November 21, 2014	November 18, 2014		
Haze	Free Radical Design	May 22, 2008	May 23, 2008	May 20, 2008		
Heavenly Sword	Ninja Theory	November 15, 2007	September 14, 2007	September 12, 2007		
Heavy Fire: Afghanistan	Mastiff	August 16, 2012	Unreleased	October 25, 2011	M	
Heavy Fire: Shattered Spear	Mastiff	May 7, 2013	August 2, 2013	January 29, 2013		
Heavy Rain	Quantic Dream	February 18, 2010	February 24, 2010	February 23, 2010	M	
Heavy Rain: Move Edition (Note: update for Heavy Rain.)	Quantic Dream	Unreleased	September 22, 2010	September 22, 2010	M	
Heavy Weapon	PopCap Games	Unreleased	September 24, 2009	June 11, 2009	D	
Hell Yeah! Wrath of the Dead Rabbit	Arkedo Studio	October 3, 2012	October 3, 2012	September 25, 2012	D	
Hellboy: The Science of Evil	Krome Studios	Unreleased	August 1, 2008	June 24, 2008		
Helldivers	Arrowhead Game Studios	March 5, 2015	March 4, 2015	March 3, 2015	D	
Heroes Over Europe	Transmission Games	Unreleased	September 18, 2009	September 14, 2009	D	
High Stakes on the Vegas Strip: Poker Edition	Coresoft	Unreleased	December 14, 2007	September 13, 2007	E	
High Velocity Bowling •Free! Free! Bowling^{JP}	Mastiff	December 9, 2010	Unreleased	September 27, 2010	3D M	
High Velocity Bowling (Move Edition) (Note: update for High Velocity Bowling.)	Mastiff	December 9, 2010	Unreleased	September 21, 2010	3D M	
Higurashi no Naku Koro ni Sui	Kaga Create	March 12, 2015	Unreleased	Unreleased		
Hiiro no Kakera Aizouban: Akane Iro no Tsuioku	Idea Factory	May 26, 2011	Unreleased	Unreleased		
Himawari no Kyoukai to Nagai Natsuyasumi: extra vacation	Keromakura	November 28, 2013	Unreleased	Unreleased		
The History Channel: Battle for the Pacific	Magic Wand Productions	Unreleased	April 11, 2008	February 19, 2008		
History Civil War: Secret Missions	Cauldron HQ	Unreleased	Unreleased	November 4, 2008		
The History Channel: Great Battles Medieval	Slitherine Software	Unreleased	February 19, 2010	Unreleased		
History Legends of War: Patton	Enigma Software Productions S.L.	April 4, 2013	April 4, 2013	April 4, 2013		
Hitman 2: Silent Assassin HD	IO Interactive	Unreleased	January 29, 2013	January 29, 2013	D	
Hitman: Absolution	IO Interactive	January 24, 2013	November 20, 2012	November 20, 2012		
Hitman: Blood Money HD	IO Interactive	Unreleased	January 29, 2013	January 29, 2013	D	
Hitman: Contracts HD	IO Interactive	Unreleased	January 29, 2013	January 29, 2013	D	
Hitman: Sniper Challenge	IO Interactive	Unreleased	May 15, 2012	May 15, 2012		
Hitogata Happa	Rockin' Android	Unreleased	August 4, 2010	June 15, 2010	D	
HOARD	Big Sandwich Games	Unreleased	June 2, 2011	November 2, 2010	D	
Hohokum	Honeyslug	August 13, 2014	August 13, 2014	August 12, 2014	D	
Hollywood Squares	Ludia	Unreleased	Unreleased	November 15, 2011	D	
Homefront	Kaos Studios	April 14, 2011	March 18, 2011	March 15, 2011		
Hot Shots Golf: World Invitational	Clap Hanz	November 22, 2012	July 24, 2013	July 23, 2013		
Hot Wheels World's Best Driver	Firebrand Games	Unreleased	September 17, 2013	September 17, 2013		
Hotline Miami	Abstraction Games	July 15, 2015	June 26, 2013	June 25, 2013	D	
Hotline Miami 2: Wrong Number	Dennaton Games	July 15, 2015	March 11, 2015	March 10, 2015	D	
The House of the Dead III	Sega Wow	April 19, 2012	February 15, 2012	February 7, 2012	D M	
The House of the Dead 4	Sega Wow	April 19, 2012	April 18, 2012	April 17, 2012	D M	
The House of the Dead: Overkill	Headstrong Games	February 23, 2012	October 28, 2011	October 25, 2011	3D M	
How to Survive	EKO Software	March 4, 2014	November 6, 2013	November 5, 2013	D	
How to Train Your Dragon	Étranges Libellules	Unreleased	March 26, 2010	March 23, 2010		
How to Train Your Dragon 2	Torus Games	Unreleased	June 13, 2014	June 10, 2014		
Hunted: The Demon's Forge	Bethesda Softworks	August 25, 2011	June 3, 2011	May 31, 2011		
Hunter's Trophy	Bigben Interactive	Unreleased	October 28, 2011	Unreleased		
Hunter's Trophy 2: America	Kylotonn Entertainment	Unreleased	September 4, 2013	September 3, 2013		
Hunter's Trophy 2: Australia	Kylotonn Entertainment	Unreleased	September 11, 2013	September 10, 2013		
Hunter's Trophy 2: Europa	Kylotonn Entertainment	Unreleased	October 26, 2012	October 26, 2012		
Hustle Kings	VooFoo Studios	February 4, 2010	December 22, 2009	January 28, 2010	D 3D M	
Hydrophobia Prophecy	Dark Energy Digital	Unreleased	November 2, 2011	November 1, 2011	D	
Hyper Void	IN|Framez Technology	Unreleased	Unreleased	February 10, 2015	D	
Hyperballoid HD	iSquared Games	Unreleased	December 10, 2009	April 22, 2010	D	
Hyperdimension Neptunia	Idea Factory, Compile Heart	July 29, 2010	March 4, 2011	Feb 15, 2011		
Hyperdimension Neptunia Mk2	Idea Factory, Compile Heart	August 18, 2011	February 24, 2012	February 28, 2012		
Hyperdimension Neptunia Victory	Idea Factory, Compile Heart	August 30, 2012	March 22, 2013	March 21, 2013		
I Am Alive	Ubisoft Shanghai	Unreleased	April 4, 2012	April 3, 2012	D	
Ibb and Obb	Sparpweed	Unreleased	August 14, 2013	August 6, 2013	D	
Ice Age: Dawn of the Dinosaurs	Eurocom	Unreleased	June 24, 2009	June 30, 2009		
Ice Age: Continental Drift – Arctic Games	Behaviour Interactive	Unreleased	July 10, 2012	Unreleased		
Ico	Team Ico	September 22, 2011	September 28, 2011	September 27, 2011	3D	
IHF Handball Challenge 14	Neutron Games	Unreleased	March 28, 2014	Unreleased		
Ikki Online	Sunsoft	June 29, 2010	Unreleased	Unreleased	D	
IL-2 Sturmovik: Birds of Prey	Gaijin Entertainment	Unreleased	September 4, 2009	September 8, 2009		
iM@s Channel (app)	Bandai Namco Entertainment	October 2, 2013	Unreleased	Unreleased	D	
Imabikisō	Chunsoft	October 25, 2007	Unreleased	Unreleased		
In Space We Brawl	Forge Reply	September 10, 2015	October 15, 2014	October 14, 2014	D	
The Incredible Hulk	Edge of Reality	Unreleased	June 20, 2008	June 5, 2008		
inFAMOUS	Sucker Punch Productions	November 5, 2009	May 29, 2009	May 26, 2009		
inFAMOUS 2	Sucker Punch Productions	July 7, 2011	June 10, 2011	June 7, 2011	M	
Infamous: Festival of Blood (Note: stand-alone expansion for inFAMOUS 2.)	Sucker Punch Productions	Unreleased	October 26, 2011	October 15, 2011	D M	
Inferno Pool	Dark Energy Digital	Unreleased	May 28, 2009	October 29, 2009	D	
Infinite Stratos 2: Ignition Hearts	5pb.	February 27, 2014	Unreleased	Unreleased		
Infinite Stratos 2: Love and Purge	5pb.	September 3, 2015	Unreleased	Unreleased		
Injustice: Gods Among Us	NetherRealm Studios	June 9, 2013	April 19, 2013	April 16, 2013		
Initial D Extreme Stage	Sega Rosso	July 3, 2008	Unreleased	Unreleased		
International Cricket 2010	Trickstar Games	Unreleased	June 18, 2010	Unreleased		
International Snooker 2012	Big Head Games Ltd.	Unreleased	March 13, 2013	Unreleased	D	
Interpol: The Trail of Dr. Chaos	TikGames	Unreleased	September 10, 2009	September 17, 2009	D	
Inversion	Saber Interactive	Unreleased	June 8, 2012	June 5, 2012		
Invincible Knight	Keystone Game Studio Inc.	December 21, 2012	Unreleased	Unreleased	D	
Invincible Tiger: The Legend of Han Tao	Blitz Arcade	August 27, 2009	August 27, 2009	August 27, 2009	D 3D	
Invizimals: The Lost Kingdom	Magenta Software, Novarama	Unreleased	September 30, 2014	October 30, 2013		
Invokers Tournament	StormBASIC Games	Unreleased	Unreleased	September 15, 2015	D	
Ion Assault HD	Coreplay	Unreleased	November 30, 2011	April 2, 2013	D	
Iron Man	Secret Level, Inc.	Unreleased	May 2, 2008	May 2, 2008		
Iron Man 2	Sega Studios San Francisco	Unreleased	April 30, 2010	May 4, 2010		
Iron Sky Invasion	Reality Pump	December 12, 2012	December 12, 2012	December 12, 2012		

== Bundles and Game Versions ==
Title	Developer(s)	Release date			Options	Ref.
Title	Developer(s)	JP	PAL	NA	Options	Ref.
The Elder Scrolls IV: Oblivion (Game of the Year edition)	Bethesda Game Studios	Unreleased	October, 2007	October, 2007		
The Elder Scrolls V: Skyrim (Legendary Edition)	Bethesda Game Studios	June 4, 2013	June 4, 2013	June 4, 2013		
God of War Collection	Santa Monica Studio	March 18, 2010	April 29, 2010	November 17, 2009		
God of War Origin Collection	Ready at Dawn	June 10, 2011	September 13, 2011	September 13, 2011		
Hitman HD Trilogy	IO Interactive	Unreleased	January 31, 2013	January 29, 2013		
