= Savage Moon =

2008 video game

- PlayStation Store icon
- Developer: FluffyLogic
- Publisher: Sony Computer Entertainment
- Designers: Ana Kronschnabl, Tomas Rawlings, Stuart Griffin
- Engine: PhyreEngine
- Platform: PlayStation 3
- Release: PAL: 24 December 2008; NA: 29 January 2009
- Genres: Tower defense, strategy
- Mode: Single-player

Savage Moon is a tower defense video game developed by British company FluffyLogic and published by Sony Computer Entertainment for the PlayStation 3. The game was released on the PlayStation Network in the PAL region on 24 December 2008 and in North America on 29 January 2009. A Waldegeist Pack edition was released in the UK on 6 August 2009.

In the game, the player protects a remote, off-world mining facility from constant attack by Insectocytes, a type of carnivorous creature inhabiting the planets. The mission is to strategically place an array of upgradeable, defensive weapons in the way of the bugs. There is a range of towers, from rapid-fire machine guns to support towers such as the chaos tower.

In 2010 the soundtrack to the DLC of Savage Moon: Waldgeist - also composed by Elsaesser, was nominated for Best Original Video Game Score in the 55th Ivor Novello Awards. This was the first year that music from games was given a category in the awards.

On 22 December 2009, a new game set in the same universe and featuring some of the same units and towers was released on the PlayStation Portable, titled The Hera Campaign. FluffyLogic would work with Sony again on Eat Them!.

== Reception ==
=== Savage Moon ===
Savage Moon

Aggregate score
Aggregator	Score
Metacritic	73/100

Review scores
Publication	Score
4Players	70%
Eurogamer	7/10
Gamekult	7/10
GameSpot	6.5/10
GameZone	7.7/10
IGN	7/10
Jeuxvideo.com	15/20
PlayStation Official Magazine – UK	7/10
Play	86%
PSM3	77%
VideoGamer.com	8/10
411Mania	7.4/10

The game received "mixed or average reviews" according to the review aggregation website Metacritic.
