= High School Musical: Sing It! =

2007 video game

- NTSC PS2 cover art
- Developer: Artificial Mind and Movement
- Publisher: Disney Interactive Studios
- Platforms: PlayStation 2, Wii
- Release: NA: October 26, 2007; EU: November 9, 2007 (PS2); AU: November 15, 2007; EU: November 16, 2007 (Wii)
- Genre: Music video game
- Modes: Single-player, multiplayer

High School Musical: Sing It! is a video game for the Wii and PlayStation 2 based on the High School Musical franchise.

The game features the songs from the first High School Musical and its 2007 sequel, High School Musical 2. It also features a selection of songs from Disney Channel artists and a "Story mode" where the players can follow the story of the first movie through Kelsi's perspective.

The characters of Troy, Gabriella, Chad, Taylor, Ryan, and Sharpay are available to the player, alongside an option to create their own character. The visuals of the game are animated and based on motion capture.

It's the first game in the Disney Sing It series and was followed by the self-titled game.

== Songs ==
1. Start of Something New
2. Get'cha Head in the Game
3. What I've Been Looking For (Sharpay and Ryan version)
4. What I've Been Looking For (Troy and Gabriella version)
5. Stick to the Status Quo
6. When There Was Me and You
7. Bop to the Top
8. Breaking Free
9. We're All in This Together
10. I Can't Take My Eyes Off of You
11. What Time Is It?
12. Fabulous
13. Work This Out
14. You Are the Music in Me
15. I Don't Dance
16. You Are the Music in Me (Sharpay Version)
17. Gotta Go My Own Way
18. Bet On It
19. Everyday **
20. All for One
21. Humuhumunukunukuapua'a
22. All Good Now *
23. Beautiful Soul *
24. Cheetah Sisters *
25. Counting on You *
26. I Will Be Around *
27. Jump to the Rhythm *
28. No One*
29. On The Ride*
30. Push It to the Limit *
- Bonus Song. This song was not in any of the High School Musical movies.
  - Original movie soundtrack recording of this song.

== Stages ==
- Auditorium
- Cafeteria
- Corridors
- Golf Course
- Gym
- New Year's Eve Lodge
- Rooftop Garden
- School Grounds
- Science Class
- Summer Resort
- Swimming Pool
- Trophy Room

== Reception ==
Reception

Aggregate score
Aggregator	Score	
Aggregator	PS2	Wii
Metacritic	56/100	64/100

Review scores
Publication	Score	
Publication	PS2	Wii
Eurogamer	5/10	N/A
Gamekult	N/A	4/10
GamesMaster	44%	N/A
GameZone	N/A	6.5/10
IGN	6.5/10	6.6/10
Jeuxvideo.com	N/A	9/20
Nintendo Life	N/A	2/10
PlayStation Official Magazine – UK	6/10	N/A
PALGN	6/10	N/A
VideoGamer.com	7/10	N/A

The game received "mixed" reviews on both platforms according to the review aggregation website Metacritic.

The PlayStation 2 version received a "Platinum" sales award from the Entertainment and Leisure Software Publishers Association (ELSPA), indicating sales of at least 300,000 units in the UK.

== See also ==
- Disney Sing It
- Disney Sing It! – High School Musical 3: Senior Year
- Disney Sing It: Pop Hits
- Disney Sing It: Party Hits
- Disney Sing It: Family Hits
