= Disney Sing It: Party Hits =

2010 video game

- Developer: Zoë Mode
- Publisher: Disney Interactive Studios
- Series: Disney Sing It
- Platforms: PlayStation 3, Wii
- Release: EU: September 24, 2010; NA: October 12, 2010
- Genre: Karaoke
- Modes: Single-player, multiplayer

Disney Sing It: Party Hits is a karaoke video game released on September 24, 2010, throughout Europe and on October 12, 2010, in the United States for the PlayStation 3 and Wii.

It is the fifth game in the Disney Sing It series. The game features songs from Disney-affiliated artists and Disney Channel productions like Camp Rock 2, Demi Lovato, Ashley Tisdale and Selena Gomez & the Scene. It also features a selection of songs from non-Disney artists like Jason Mraz, Iyaz and Colbie Caillat and a "Singing lessons" mode with Demi Lovato as a vocal coach. This is the first game in the series to include a music store for downloadable content (not available to the Wii version). It was followed by a sixth and final game, Disney Sing It: Family Hits.

== Songs ==
Disney Sing It: Party Hits features a number of songs by Disney-affiliated artists as well as Disney Channel related shows and films, Camp Rock 2: The Final Jam, Hollywood Records and some other label signed artists and bands.

=== Track list ===
Artist/Band	Song	Disney affiliated	Released
Allstar Weekend	A Different Side of Me	No	2010
Ashley Tisdale	It's Alright, It's OK	Yes	2009
Black Eyed Peas	Boom Boom Pow	N/A	2009
Camp Rock 2	Brand New Day	Yes	2010
Camp Rock 2	Can't Back Down	Yes	2010
Camp Rock 2	Fire	Yes	2010
Camp Rock 2	Wouldn't Change a Thing	Yes	2010
Camp Rock 2	Introducing Me	Yes	2010
Camp Rock 2	It's On	Yes	2010
Colbie Caillat	I Never Told You	N/A	2010
David Guetta ft. Kelly Rowland	When Love Takes Over	No	2009
Demi Lovato	Here We Go Again	Yes	2009
Demi Lovato	Remember December	Yes	2009
Demi Lovato	Me, Myself and Time	Yes	2010
Iyaz	Solo	N/A	2010
Jason Mraz	I'm Yours	N/A	2008
Jonas Brothers	Fly With Me	Yes	2009
Jonas Brothers	Paranoid	Yes	2009
Jordin Sparks	Battlefield	Yes	2009
Justin Bieber	One Less Lonely Girl	N/A	2009
Justin Bieber	One Time	N/A	2009
Kelly Clarkson	Already Gone	N/A	2009
Nick Jonas & the Administration	Who I Am	Yes	2009
OneRepublic	All the Right Moves	No	2009
Owl City	Fireflies	N/A	2009
Paramore	Brick By Boring Brick	N/A	2009
Paramore	Ignorance	N/A	2009
Selena Gomez & the Scene	Falling Down	Yes	2009
Selena Gomez & the Scene	Magic	Yes	2009
Selena Gomez & the Scene	Naturally	Yes	2010

=== Downloadable content (Exclusive to PS3 version) ===
Artist/Band	Song	Disney affiliated	Released
Hannah Montana	Ordinary Girl	Yes	2010
Selena Gomez & the Scene	Round & Round	Yes	2010
Allstar Weekend	Dance Forever	Yes	2010
Orianthi	According to You	No	2009
Train	Hey, Soul Sister	No	2010
Jordin Sparks	S.O.S. (Let the Music Play)	No	2009
Carrie Underwood	Undo It	No	2010

== See also ==
- High School Musical: Sing It!
- Disney Sing It
- Disney Sing It! – High School Musical 3: Senior Year
- Disney Sing It: Pop Hits
- Disney Sing It: Family Hits
