= Rival Peak =

Series of interactive livestreams

- Developers: Pipeworks, DJ2 Entertainment
- Publisher: Genvid
- Platforms: Windows, MacOS, Android, iOS
- Release: December 2, 2020
- Genre: MILE

Rival Speak
- Developed by: Facebook, Genvid
- Starring: Wil Wheaton

Production
- Producer: DJ2 Entertainment

Original release
- Network: Facebook Watch
- Release: December 9, 2020 – March 2021

Rival Peak was a three-month interactive media experience that appeared (along with weekly companion show Rival Speak, hosted by Wil Wheaton) on Facebook from December, 2020 to March, 2021. Rival Peak and Rival Speak were co-created by game developer Pipeworks Studios, interactive broadcasting company Genvid Technologies, and Hollywood production firm DJ2 Entertainment in approximately six months, building on previous AI-driven, Unity-based simulation engines Pipeworks had created.

== Premise ==
Rival Peak involved 13 persistent, interactive livestreams broadcasting the activities of a dozen AI-driven "contestants" on a simulated reality television show featuring viewer interaction. Viewers were able to impact the contestants and their environs in real time via an interactive overlay on the livestreams to do things such as vote on tomorrow's weather, help or hinder the AI characters in a range of decisions and projects, solve puzzles and so forth. Audience interactions contributed points to each contestant's cumulative score, which in turn was used to determine the weekly elimination of a contestant.

== Rival Speak ==
Weekly wrap-up show Rival Speak featured host Wil Wheaton summarizing the previous week's activity and evolving storyline, interviewing the AI contestants, and revealing additional plot points. Because viewer interactions influenced the storyline in real-time, Rival Speak had an extremely tight production schedule. As Wheaton described it, "The technical challenges in pulling this thing together were interesting to watch. But it was really fun and exciting to watch them turn around episodes so fast." At its climax, viewers learned that Wil was also part of the conspiracy, as he appeared (via avatar) inside the simulation after previously manifesting as his live-action self in each episode of Rival Speak. Wheaton talked about his experience working with a dozen virtual characters and an always-evolving storyline/script during a pandemic.

== Development ==
The simulation at the heart of Rival Peak was evolved from earlier AI-driven simulations from Pipeworks studios code named Project Galapagos and Project Eleusis, respectively. The Rival Peak "game engine" enabled the twelve AI characters to interact and exist in their simulated world autonomously, like an elaborate ant farm. Viewers could then watch the independent livestream camera feeds for each AI contestant (as well as a thirteenth "homescreen" stream) and click on various buttons on the interactive overlay of each stream to interact with the show.

By handling all rendering, animation, and data input in the cloud and limiting user interaction to the video streams, any number of simultaneous participants could collectively and individually affect the gameplay natively through the Facebook app, on phones, tablets, and PCs.

Over the course of its thirteen-week run, numerous enhancements were added to the interactive, livestreamed experience, primarily based on viewer feedback.

Production on the weekly wrap-up show Rival Speak required an elaborate, open-ended storyline and frequent on-the-fly script revisions based on numerous elements of the show and characters being determined in real time by the viewers. DJ2 Entertainment's head of creative, Stephan Bugaj (who also oversaw creative direction on several of Telltale Games's titles such as its episodic adventure version of The Walking Dead) was the lead writer, eventually drafting more than 160,000 words of dialog - many of which went unused as the story unfolded in unanticipated directions.

== Viewership ==
Based on original IP, Rival Peak gained viewership gradually over its first month, geometrically over the second month and exponentially in its third/final month. Ultimately the interactive livestreams garnered more than 100 million viewer minutes while the Rival Speak companion show's twelve episodes attracted more than 155 million views.

== Reception ==
Rival Peak garnered more than 100 million minutes viewed over the course of its twelve-week season. Rival Speak also attracted a substantial audience, with the twelve weekly episodes averaging about thirteen million views each. Rival Peak attracted viewers from more than 70 countries with the biggest audiences coming from the United States, India, Brazil, Mexico and the Philippines. By the time the season ended, viewership had increased by 55x compared to Week One.

Critical acclaim for Rival Peak was broad, with both consumer and trade outlets touting Rival Peak as a potential technology and entertainment breakthrough. EGMNow's Josh Harmon stated "But more than the experience of watching (or play-watching, perhaps) Rival Peak, it's the technology and artistic approach underpinning the project that's of greatest interest to those of us who play traditional video games." Harmon also noted that "it's clear the gaming industry is looking for ways to tell different and more dynamic stories, and Rival Peak's technology points to another potential way forward," and "In the coming years, we may once again return to the days when new gaming experiences constantly redefine our expectations of what the medium can be. And if we do reach that lofty mountaintop, the quirky, category-defying Rival Peak will have to be remembered as a step on the way."

Screen Rant's John Orquiola described Rival Peak as "incredibly successful," and "a phenomenon on Facebook Watch," while the European gaming industry trade outlet MCV/Develop's editor Seth Barton stated "So this is cloud gaming in a form, but it's a very, very different approach from those who are trying to shift the games console into server farms. This is a far less intensive implementation, less interactive but still highly engaging it appears. And capable of reaching numbers that xCloud and Stadia can only dream about."

GameBusiness.jp, a Japanese trade outlet, described Rival Peak as "the world's first viewer-led reality show," and praised the unpredictability of the show caused by "viewer interventions." And Los Angeles Times game critic Todd Martens drew positive comparisons between Rival Peak and The Sims and Tamagotchi virtual pets.
