= Platine Dispositif =

Japanese Video Game Developer

- Industry: Video game development
- Headquarters: Japan
- Website: www.platinedispositif.net

PlatineDispositif is an independent Japanese video game developer, consisting solely of an individual with the pseudonym AEjuMurasame. The genres of the games are varied, but mostly consist of titles imitating early and mid 1990s console productions such as traditional shooters and metroidvania games. Most of his games are released for PC in varying forms, but some have been rereleased through the PlayStation Network.

== Games ==
- Beyond Fallendom – 2016 – A Top Down adventure game in the style of Zelda A Link To The Past.
- Bloodvane – 2011 – A sidescrolling bullet hell shooter.
- Bunny Must Die: Chelsea and the 7 Devils – 2006 – A 2D metroidvania title designed to be cleared twice. Clearing the game once alters the stage design and boss order and switches to another playable character.
- Dandelion – Starchild Journey – 2006
- DicingKnight.
- Engage to Jabberwock – 2004 – A Gauntlet type game, with manic shooter elements.
- GundeadliGne – 2010 – Sequel to Gundemonium.
- Gundemonium Collection – 2010 – Sequel to Gundemonium and GundeadliGne.
- Gundemonium – 2003 – A side-scrolling bullet hell shooter.
- Gundemoniums - 2018 - A PS4 remaster of Gundemonium.
- Hitogata Happa – Top-scrolling bullet hell shooter with elements from the Gundemonium games. More powerful player characters are bought after each stage and the player only loses when the stage timer runs out.
- Meido-san o Migi ni – 2004
- Royal Edoma Engine – 2005 – An isometric shooter combining the aesthetics of arcade games Viewpoint by Sammy and Märchen Maze by Namco, the player embodying a female hero similar to that of the latter game.
- Super Zangura - 2022 - A PS4 remaster of Zangura.
- Zangura - 2004
