= Disney Sing It! – High School Musical 3: Senior Year =

2008 video game

- Developer: Zoë Mode
- Publisher: Disney Interactive Studios
- Series: Disney Sing It
- Platforms: PlayStation 2 PlayStation 3 Wii; Xbox 360; Microsoft Windows
- Release: EU: November 28, 2008; NA: February 17, 2009
- Genre: Karaoke
- Modes: Single-player, multiplayer

Disney Sing It! – High School Musical 3: Senior Year is a karaoke video game released on November 28, 2008, across multiple platforms, within Europe and on February 17, 2009, in North America.

It's the third game in the Disney Sing It series and the second game of the series focused on the High School Musical franchise. Despite being titled after the third movie, the game features songs from the three movies of the main series. It also features a "Singing lessons" mode with Olesya Rulin as a vocal coach.

It was followed by a fourth game, Disney Sing It: Pop Hits.

== Gameplay ==
Unlike High School Musical: Sing It! which contained animations for the musical numbers, this game is set out exactly like a SingStar game but instead of music videos, they used the actual musical sequence from the film.

It was released in North America on February 17, 2009, coinciding with the DVD and Blu-ray Disc releases of the film. The North American version included an additional 2 songs from High School Musical 2, and 3 songs from High School Musical 3, giving the entire High School Musical 3 songlist.

Disney Sing It: High School Musical 3: Senior Year for the Xbox 360 allows use of the wireless Microsoft Lips microphones. Similarly the PlayStation 3 version allows the use of the SingStar wireless microphones.

== Songs ==
- NA: North America Version.

=== High School Musical ===
- "We're All in This Together"
- "Breaking Free"
- "When There Was Me and You"
- "Stick to the Status Quo"
- "Bop to the Top"
- "Get'cha Head in the Game
- "Start of Something New"

=== High School Musical 2 ===
- "All for One"
- "Everyday"
- "Gotta Go My Own Way"
- "I Don't Dance" (NA version only)
- "You Are the Music in Me"
- "Work This Out" (NA version only)
- "Fabulous"
- "What Time Is It"

=== High School Musical 3: Senior Year ===
- "High School Musical"
- "Walk Away"
- "Scream" (NA version only)
- "The Boys Are Back"
- "A Night to Remember"
- "Just Wanna Be with You"
- "Can I Have This Dance?"
- "I Want It All"
- "Right Here, Right Now" (NA version only) (second verse omitted)
- "Now or Never" (NA version only)

== See also ==
- High School Musical: Sing It!
- Disney Sing It
- Disney Sing It: Pop Hits
- Disney Sing It: Party Hits
- Disney Sing It: Family Hits
