= Disney Sing It: Pop Hits =

2009 video game

- Developer: Zoë Mode
- Publisher: Disney Interactive Studios
- Series: Disney Sing It
- Platforms: PlayStation 2, PlayStation 3, Wii
- Release: NA: October 6, 2009; EU: October 9, 2009; AU: October 21, 2009
- Genre: Karaoke
- Modes: Single-player, Multiplayer

Disney Sing It: Pop Hits is a karaoke video game released on October 6, 2009, across multiple platforms.

It's the fourth game in the Disney Sing It series. The game features songs from Disney-affiliated artists and Disney Channel productions like Hannah Montana, Camp Rock, Demi Lovato, Vanessa Hudgens and the Jonas Brothers. It also features a selection of songs from non-Disney artists like Taylor Swift, Coldplay and Duffy and a "Singing lessons" mode with a virtual vocal coach.

It was followed by a fifth game, Disney Sing It: Party Hits.

== Songs ==
Disney Sing It: Pop Hits features a number of songs by Disney-affiliated artists as well as Disney Channel related shows and films such as Hannah Montana, High School Musical 3, Camp Rock Cast (Demi Lovato and the Jonas Brothers) and popular songs heard on Radio Disney.

=== Track list ===
Artist/Band	Song	Disney affiliated	Released	US exclusive	EU exclusive
Miley Cyrus	"7 Things"	Yes	2008	-	-
Miley Cyrus	"Fly on the Wall"	Yes	2009	-	-
Miley Cyrus	"The Climb"	Yes	2009	-	-
Miley Cyrus	"Hoedown Throwdown"	Yes	2009	-	-
Demi Lovato	"Get Back"	Yes	2008	-	-
Demi Lovato	"La La Land"	Yes	2008	-	-
Demi Lovato	"Don't Forget"	Yes	2009	-	-
Jonas Brothers	"Hold On"	Yes	2007	-	-
Jonas Brothers	"SOS"	Yes	2007	-	-
Jonas Brothers	"When You Look Me In The Eyes"	Yes	2008	-	-
Jonas Brothers	"Lovebug"	Yes	2008	-	-
Jonas Brothers	"Burnin' Up"	Yes	2008	-	-
Colbie Caillat	"Realize"	-	2008	-	-
Colbie Caillat	"Bubbly"	-	2007	-	-
Vanessa Hudgens	"Sneakernight"	Yes	2008	-	-
Jesse McCartney	"It's Over"	-	2008	Yes	-
Jesse McCartney	"How Do You Sleep?"	-	2009	-	-
Taylor Swift	"I'm Only Me When I'm with You"	-	2006	-	-
Taylor Swift	"Change"	-	2008	-	-
OneRepublic	"Apologize"	-	2006	-	-
Duffy	"Warwick Avenue"	-	2008	-	-
Duffy	"Mercy"	-	2008	-	-
Coldplay	"Violet Hill"	-	2008	-	-
Steve Rushton	"Emergency"	-	2009	-	-
Love & Theft	"Don't Wake Me"	-	2009	Yes	-
Mitchel Musso	"Let It Go" (with Tiffany Thornton)	Yes	2009	Yes	-
Mitchel Musso	"The In Crowd"	Yes	2008	Yes	-
Hannah Montana	"Let's Do This"	Yes	2009	-	-
Hannah Montana	"Let's Get Crazy"	Yes	2009	-	-
Jem	"It's Amazing"	-	2008	-	-
High School Musical 3	"Right Here, Right Now"	Yes	2008	-	Yes
High School Musical 3	"Scream"	Yes	2008	-	Yes
Ismael	Dame Besos	"Yes"	2009	-	Yes
Jacopo Sarno	È Tardi	"Yes" (Italian Disney Channel)	2009	-	Yes

== See also ==
- High School Musical: Sing It!
- Disney Sing It
- Disney Sing It! – High School Musical 3: Senior Year
- Disney Sing It: Party Hits
- Disney Sing It: Family Hits
