= Dunamis 15 =

2011 video game

- Developer(s): 5pb.
- Publisher(s): 5pb.
- Producer(s): Kazuhiro Ichikawa; Hajime Kanasugi
- Artist(s): Megumi Nagahama
- Platform(s): PlayStation 3 PlayStation Portable; Xbox 360
- Release: PlayStation 3, Xbox 360: JP: September 15, 2011; PlayStation Portable: JP: July 26, 2012
- Genre(s): Adventure, visual Novel
- Mode(s): Single-player

Dunamis15 (デュナミス15, Dyunamisu15) is a suspense visual novel developed and published by 5pb. for the PlayStation 3 and Xbox 360. The game was released in Japan on September 15, 2011, featuring five chapters and five main characters. A port for the PlayStation Portable was released on July 26, 2012. The sequel title, Disorder 6, was released on August 22, 2013. It is the first title in Suspense-fiction Adventure series.

== Gameplay ==
Dunamis15 uses a game system called "multi site system," which has the player switch off between main characters depending on where their player is in the story. Time in the game will loop, so the player will end up experiencing the same story repeatedly. The player will need to follow the proper route in order to escape from this loop.

The game has five chapters, each told from the perspective of a different main character.

== Plot ==
=== Setting ===
Dunamis15 is set in a world slightly in the future where a nuclear explosion has caused genetic mutations. All the students at Ceres Academy are clones who were created as materials for cloning technology research. Certain events that transpired caused the students to rebel.

=== Story ===
Tōgo Takatsuki is leading a boring life at Ceres Academy, located on an isolated island called Dunamis Base. One day, while rushing to class after having overslept, Tōgo stumbles upon a mysterious girl in the school hallway. This brief encounter then changes Tōgo's life forever.

=== Characters ===
Tōgo Takatsuki (高槻東吾, Takatsuki Tōgo)
Voiced by: Hiroki Tōchi
Tōgo has the highest grade at Dunamis Base. He's scheduled to graduate next year, but has yet to have a clear vision for the future.

Nanao Oka (陸 七生, Oka Nanao)
Voiced by: Yuto Suzuki
Nanao likes to sneak into the girl's dorm. He's popular amongst the female students and will interact with any girl.

Ichika Yamato (倭 一花, Yamato Ichika)
Voiced by: Sumi Shimamoto
Ichika is an excellent student. She's humorous and is well liked by male students and teachers. She has no particular concern.

Manami Gotō (後藤眞波, Gotō Manami)
Voiced by: Sakura Tange
Manami is a precocious girl who wants to fall in love. It seems that she will be going after Tōgo.

Chihaya Setsu (世津茅早, Setsu Chihaya)
Voiced by: Minori Chihara
Chihaya is an exchange student from the main island. Due to a genetic mutation, her growth has stopped. She is described as a "cool girl".

== Music ==
The game's opening theme is Kimi ga Boku nara (キミがボクなら) performed by Asriel's Kokomi and the ending theme is Promised Land by Asami Imai. There is also a "grand ending"; Kokuin ~tattoo~ (刻印～tattoo～) by Naomi Tamura.

== Releases ==
Following the game's release for the PlayStation 3 and Xbox 360 on September 15, 2011, a version for the PlayStation Portable was released on July 26, 2012. The PSP version includes new features and additional "past and future" episodes of the story.
