= Hot Wheels: World's Best Driver =

2013 video game

- Developer: Firebrand Games
- Publishers: Warner Bros. Interactive Entertainment; Chillingo (iOS)
- Series: Hot Wheels
- Platforms: PlayStation 3; Xbox 360; Wii U; Windows; Nintendo 3DS; iOS
- Release: NA: September 17, 2013; EU: September 20, 2013; AU: October 2, 2013; AU: October 9, 2013 (3DS); iOS: WW: January 9, 2014
- Genre: Racing
- Modes: Single-player, multiplayer

Hot Wheels: World's Best Driver is an arcade-style video game based on the Hot Wheels toyline by Mattel, developed by Firebrand Games and published by Warner Bros. Interactive Entertainment. It was released in September 2013 for Windows, PlayStation 3, Xbox 360, Wii U, and Nintendo 3DS, and in January 2014 for iOS.

== Gameplay ==
World's Best Driver is an arcade-style video game. Players can play as either the Green, Red, Blue, and Yellow Team. Each team possess a different skill asset: Green Team focuses on speed, Red Team focuses on stunts, Blue Team on drifting, and Yellow Team on destruction.

== Reception ==
Reception

Aggregate scores
Aggregator	Score					
Aggregator	3DS	iOS	PC	PS3	Wii U	Xbox 360
GameRankings	N/A	N/A	N/A	30.00%	30.00%	N/A
Metacritic	N/A	39/100	40/100	40/100	30/100	N/A

Review scores
Publication	Score					
Publication	3DS	iOS	PC	PS3	Wii U	Xbox 360
Nintendo Life	N/A	N/A	N/A	N/A	3/10	N/A
3rd Strike	4.2/10	N/A	N/A	N/A	N/A	N/A
Pocket Gamer	N/A	4/10	N/A	N/A	N/A	N/A
Common Sense Media	N/A	N/A	N/A	N/A	N/A	4/5

Hot Wheels World's Best Driver received generally unfavorable reviews.
