= Pipeworks Studios =

American video game developer

Pipeworks, Inc.
- Trade name: Pipeworks Studios
- Formerly: Pipeworks Software; Pipeworks Studio
- Type: Subsidiary
- Industry: Video games
- Founded: November 1999; 27 years ago
- Founders: Dan White; Dan Duncalf
- Headquarters: Eugene, Oregon, US
- Key people: Lindsay Gupton (president)
- Number of employees: 204 (2022)
- Parent: Foundation 9 Entertainment (2005–2014); Digital Bros (2014–2018); Northern Pacific Group (2018–2020); Sumo Group (2020–2022); Jagex (2022–2025); Virtuos (2025–present)
- Website: pipeworks.com

Pipeworks, Inc. (also known as Pipeworks and doing business as Pipeworks Studios) is an American video game developer based in Eugene, Oregon. The company was founded in November 1999 by Dan White and Dan Duncalf and works to provide full development, co-development, and live operations to video game publishers and other partners, in addition to creating original IPs.

== History ==
Pipeworks Software was founded in Eugene, Oregon, in November 1999 by Dan White and Dan Duncalf, two developers formerly of Dynamix. White and Duncalf assumed the roles of chief technical officer and president, respectively, and Phil Cowles was hired as director of business development. On April 12, 2005, it was announced that Pipeworks had been acquired by Foundation 9 Entertainment, a video game conglomerate company founded the month prior. Subsequently, Duncalf joined Foundation 9's board of directors. By May 2010, Pipeworks had 60 employees. In September 2014, under advisory from GP Bullhound, Foundation 9 sold Pipeworks to Italian game publishing company Digital Bros. By February 2016, Pipeworks employed 75 people and had changed its name to Pipeworks Studio. Digital Bros sold Pipeworks off to Northern Pacific Group for US$20 million in February 2018, and the studio was later renamed Pipeworks Studios. In September 2020, Sumo Group acquired Pipeworks for $100 million. Together with its new parent company, the studio opened a subsidiary, Timbre Games, in Canada under the management of Joe Nickolls.

In July 2022, Pipeworks Studios was acquired by Jagex, developers of the RuneScape franchise. It was acquired by Virtuos for an undisclosed sum on January 22, 2025, with the goal of becoming Virtuos' lead video game studio in the Americas.

== Games developed ==
Year	Title	Platform(s)
2001	GLOM	Palm OS
2002	Godzilla: Destroy All Monsters Melee	GameCube, Xbox
2004	Godzilla: Save the Earth	PlayStation 2, Xbox
2005	Prince of Persia: Revelations	PlayStation Portable
2006	Rampage: Total Destruction	GameCube, PlayStation 2, Wii
2007	Prince of Persia: Rival Swords	PlayStation Portable, Wii
2007	NHRA Drag Racing: Countdown to the Championship	PlayStation 2, PlayStation Portable
2007	Godzilla: Unleashed	PlayStation 2, Wii
2007	Boogie	PlayStation 2
2008	Merv Griffin's Crosswords	Wii
2009	Night at the Museum: Battle of the Smithsonian	Wii, Xbox 360
2009	Charm Girls Club: Pajama Party	Wii
2009	GeoStorm	Windows
2010	Monopoly	PlayStation Portable
2010	Jeopardy!	Wii
2010	Wheel of Fortune	Wii
2010	Deadliest Warrior	PlayStation 3, Xbox 360
2010	Zumba Fitness	PlayStation 3, Wii, Xbox 360
2010	UDraw Studio	Wii
2011	Deadliest Warrior: Legends	PlayStation 3, Xbox 360
2011	Gremlins: Gizmo	Wii
2012	Devil May Cry: HD Collection	PlayStation 3, Xbox 360
2012	Wheel of Fortune	PlayStation 3, Wii U, Xbox 360
2012	Jeopardy!	PlayStation 3, Wii U, Xbox 360
2012	Deadliest Warrior Ancient Combat	Xbox 360, PlayStation 3
2012	Wreck-It Ralph	Wii, 3DS, DS
2013	Dancing With the Stars: Keep Dancing	Web Browser, Windows
2013	World Series of Poker: Full House Pro	Xbox 360
2013	Laugh Factory	PlayStation 3
2014	Godzilla: Smash 3	Android, iOS
2015	SoccerDie	iOS
2015	Gems of War	Xbox One, PlayStation 4
2016	Prominence Poker	Windows, PlayStation 4, Xbox One
2016	Superfight	Windows
2017	Queen's Sea Poker	Android, iOS
2018	Terraria (ports)	PlayStation 4, Xbox One, Nintendo Switch
2018	King's Cruise Lottery	Android, iOS
2019	SoccerDie: Cosmic Cup	Nintendo Switch
2019	Adventure Academy	iOS, Windows, MacOS
2019	Queen's Sea Blackjack	iOS, Android
2020	Rival Peak	Windows, MacOS, Android, iOS
2022	The Walking Dead: Last Mile	Windows, MacOS, Android, iOS
2022	Magic Spellslingers	Windows, MacOS, Android, iOS
2023	Mole Gem Mayhem	Netflix
2026	Godzilla: Destroy All Monsters Melee Remastered	Microsoft Windows, PlayStation 5, Xbox Series X, Nintendo Switch, Nintendo Switch 2

=== Co-development ===
Year	Title	Platform(s)	Ref.
2012	Sonic & All-Stars Racing Transformed	PlayStation 3, Wii U, Xbox 360	
2019	Madden 20	PlayStation 4, Xbox One, Windows	
2020	Madden 21	Windows, Xbox Series X/S, PlayStation 5, Xbox One, PlayStation 4	
2021	Madden 22	Windows, Xbox Series X/S, PlayStation 5, Xbox One, PlayStation 4	
2021	Call of Duty: Vanguard	Windows, Xbox Series X/S, PlayStation 5, Xbox One, PlayStation 4	
2022	Microsoft Flight Simulator 40th Anniversary Edition	Windows, Xbox Series X/S	
2022	Madden 23	Windows, MacOS, Android, iOS	
2023	Madden 24	Windows, Xbox Series X/S, PlayStation 5, Xbox One, PlayStation 4	
2023	Call Of Duty: Modern Warfare III	Windows, Xbox Series X/S, PlayStation 5, Xbox One, PlayStation 4	
2024	EA Sports College Football 25	Xbox Series X/S, PlayStation 5	
2024	Madden 25	Windows, Xbox Series X/S, PlayStation 5, Xbox One, PlayStation 4	
2024	Concord	Windows, PlayStation 5	
2024	Ara: History Untold	Windows	
2026	Marathon	Windows, Xbox Series X/S, PlayStation 5	
TBA	Wu-Tang: Rise of the Deceiver	Windows	
