= Fast & Furious: Showdown =

2013 video game

- Developer: Firebrand Games
- Publisher: Activision
- Series: Fast & Furious
- Platforms: Xbox 360; PlayStation 3 Wii U Nintendo 3DS; Microsoft Windows
- Release: NA: May 21, 2013; AU: May 22, 2013; EU: May 24, 2013
- Genre: Racing
- Modes: Single-player, multiplayer

Fast & Furious: Showdown is a racing video game developed by Firebrand Games. It was published by Activision for Xbox 360, PlayStation 3, Wii U, Nintendo 3DS, and Microsoft Windows. The game is based on Fast & Furious series, and bridges the story between the movies Fast Five and Fast & Furious 6.

== Plot ==
The player takes control of many of the major Fast & Furious series characters, except for the noticeably absent Dominic Toretto.

The story begins with a cut scene featuring Monica Fuentes finding Riley Hicks digging around through files in her office. Riley introduces herself and states she is going to meet Luke Hobbs in 24 hours, and needs to know everything Hobbs has been up to. The missions are then events told by Monica to explain what Hobbs had been dealing with. Through this, various events from the movies, like the safe dragging scene from Fast Five, or the hijacking scene from Fast & Furious are presented.

== Gameplay ==
The gameplay of Fast & Furious: Showdown focuses on cooperative driving and car combat. The game is centered around different missions, all centered around driving around in semi-destructible loops. These missions can range from a normal race to surviving a certain number of laps. In some missions, the character may need to hijack another vehicle by jumping from the top of their vehicle to the other. All the cars have health bars, and some feature nitro abilities.

The game can be played with an AI partner or in local cooperative play. There is no online gameplay. The gameplay varies from having two separate cars, to one person manning the turret while the other drives, to one person jumping out of the car and hijacking the other.

As you progress through the game you unlock concept art, movie stills and mods, which are limited to three slots per car, and can be used to assist the player during missions. For example, to increase health, acceleration, top speed and have unlimited ammo. (Mods are only available in select missions and playlists in the 3DS version)

== Reception ==
Reception

Aggregate score
Aggregator	Score				
Aggregator	3DS	PC	PS3	Wii U	Xbox 360
Metacritic	N/A	N/A	21/100	N/A	22/100

Review scores
Publication	Score				
Publication	3DS	PC	PS3	Wii U	Xbox 360
IGN	N/A	N/A	2.5/10	N/A	2.5/10
Nintendo Life	N/A	N/A	N/A	2/10	N/A
Pocket Gamer	5/10	N/A	N/A	N/A	N/A
New Game Network	N/A	42/100	N/A	N/A	N/A
Metro	N/A	N/A	N/A	N/A	1/10

Fast & Furious: Showdown received negative reviews from critics. IGN editor Marty Sliva said that the game "seemed to actively try to persuade me to stop playing before I reached the finish line." Alex V from New Game Network was less hard on the game and said that "Fast and Furious: Showdown should only be of interest to the casual gamers who enjoy the films."
