= Derby Time Online =

2008 horse racing video game

- Developer(s): Japan Studio
- Publisher(s): Sony Computer Entertainment
- Platform(s): PlayStation 3
- Release: JP: November 13, 2008
- Genre(s): Sports
- Mode(s): Single-player

Derby Time Online is a horse racing simulation video game developed and published by Sony Computer Entertainment for the PlayStation 3. It was only released in Japan.

The multiplayer servers for the game went offline on June 3, 2009.
