= Firebrand Games =

British video game developer

Firebrand Games Limited
- Company type: Private
- Industry: Video games
- Predecessor: DC Studios
- Founded: 2006; 19 years ago
- Founder: Mark Greenshields
- Headquarters: Glasgow, Scotland
- Key people: Mark Greenshields (CEO)
- Website: firebrandgames.com

Firebrand Games Limited is a British video game developer based in Glasgow, Scotland. The company was founded by chief executive officer Mark Greenshields in 2006 and has operated a second office in Merritt Island, Florida, since September 2007.

== History ==
Firebrand Games was founded by Mark Greenshields in 2006, after his previous venture, DC Studios, closed its operations in the United Kingdom earlier that year. He became the new company's chief executive officer. In September 2007, the company announced the opening a second office in Merritt Island, Florida. This office replaced DC Studios' only remaining studio, which was based in Montreal. In September 2009, Firebrand Games' headquarters were moved into new, larger office spaces within Glasgow. By August 2010, primarily due to the cost of doing business in Scotland, the Meritt Island office had grown larger in headcount than the Glasgow headquarters.

Firebrand Games has primarily worked on Nintendo DS versions of third-party intellectual properties in the racing genre, including TrackMania and Need for Speed. Several of these use the in-house game engine titled 3D Octane. In May 2011, the company stated its desire to develop a game in the F-Zero franchise. Firebrand Games announced its first original intellectual property, the puzzle game Solar Flux, in July 2013.

== Games developed ==
Year	Title	Platform(s)	Publisher(s)
2006	Cartoon Network Racing	Nintendo DS	The Game Factory
2007	Race Driver: Create & Race	Nintendo DS	Codemasters
2008	Ferrari Challenge: Trofeo Pirelli	Nintendo DS	System 3
2008	Race Driver: Grid	Nintendo DS	Codemasters
2008	TrackMania DS	Nintendo DS	Focus Home Interactive, Atlus USA
2008	Need for Speed: Undercover	Nintendo DS	Electronic Arts
2009	Colin McRae: Dirt 2	Nintendo DS	Codemasters
2009	Need for Speed: Nitro	Nintendo DS	Electronic Arts
2009	Planet 51: The Game	Nintendo DS	Sega
2010	SpongeBob's Boating Bash	Nintendo DS	THQ
2010	TrackMania Turbo	Nintendo DS	Focus Home Interactive
2010	TrackMania: Build to Race	Wii	Focus Home Interactive
2010	Hot Wheels: Track Attack	Nintendo DS, Wii	THQ
2010	Need for Speed: Nitro-X	Nintendo DSi	Electronic Arts
2011	NASCAR Unleashed	Nintendo 3DS, PlayStation 3, Wii, Xbox 360	Activision
2011	Cars 2	Nintendo 3DS, Nintendo DS	Disney Interactive Studios
2011	Need for Speed: The Run	Nintendo 3DS, Wii	Electronic Arts
2013	Fast & Furious: Showdown	Microsoft Windows, Nintendo 3DS, PlayStation 3, Wii U, Xbox 360	Activision
2013	Mr & Mrs	iOS	Sony Computer Entertainment
2013	Solar Flux	Linux, macOS, Microsoft Windows	Firebrand Games
2013	Solar Flux Pocket	Android, iOS	Firebrand Games
2013	Hot Wheels: World's Best Driver	Microsoft Windows, Nintendo 3DS, PlayStation 3, Wii U, Xbox 360	Warner Bros. Interactive Entertainment
2015	WRC FIA World Rally Championship	Nintendo 3DS, Android, iOS	Bigben Interactive
2017	NASCAR Heat Mobile	Android, iOS	704Games
2020	Conjurer Andy's Repeatable Dungeon	iOS, Microsoft Windows, Nintendo Switch	Firebrand Games
