= Hyper Void =

- Developer: InFramez Technology
- Publisher: InFramez Technology
- Designers: Homam Bahnassi; Wessam Bahnassi
- Programmer: Wessam Bahnassi
- Artist: Homam Bahnassi
- Composer: Kamel Bushnaq
- Engine: DSK
- Platforms: PlayStation 3 PlayStation 4 Xbox One; Microsoft Windows
- Release: PlayStation 3 February 10, 2015; PlayStation 4 September 8, 2015; Xbox One; January 6, 2016; Microsoft Windows; October 9, 2017
- Genre: Shooter
- Mode: Single-player

Hyper Void is a 3D shooter video game, developed and published by InFramez Technology. It was released for PlayStation 3, PlayStation 4, Xbox One and Microsoft Windows.

== Gameplay ==
Hyper Void is a 3D tube shooter. the RM-24, a combat space ship armed with 3 different weapons that can be fired simultaneously and are assigned to three different buttons. The weapons vary in damage, rate of fire and bullet speed and all of them consume energy from a shared power source that recharges over time, requiring the player to think and aim rather than just hold the fire button indefinitely.

Movement is restricted to sideways only. Combat occurs in a variety of different environments, most notably inside cross-dimensional wormholes depicted as dynamic twisted tubes with kaleidoscopic visuals, but also in deep outer space at different galaxies. The challenge of wormholes comes from the unconventional (often flipped) path ways, which in many cases loop in closed circles or other shapes, sometimes forcing the player to fly flipped upside-down. Certain wormholes are so distorted that even the player's bullets will ultimately reach the reverse of where they would normally go.

Enemy encounters vary in type and size. Common enemies are usually destroyed with a few well-timed shots and come in numbers and a wide variety of movement patterns. Such enemies exhibit different types and behaviors (e.g. explosive tracking mines, mobile missile pods, magnetically charged bombs and teleporters).

Another class of enemies is bosses, which appear in more than half of the levels, and pose a longer and more strategic challenge. Bosses often follow certain patterns of attack and require the player to discover their weakness point before taking them down.

The final class of enemies is the IPA virus. A formless cloud of matter that infects the player's ship causing different negative effects like graphical corruption, flipped controls, loss of weapon charge, and movement overriding. The virus is automatically cleaned away after a certain time of infection. In three levels, the virus manifests itself in boss encounters.

The game contains 29 levels organized in 3 different galaxies. At the end of each galaxy is a major encounter with the game's main enemy: the IPA virus.

Levels are generally split between two main setups: outer space and wormholes. Outer space is recognized by straightforward movement and outer space scenery such as planets and nebulae. Wormholes are tube-like with a wide variety of dynamic cross-sections. They also feature wildly changing colors and patterns often in sync with the background playing music.

Some levels offer a different experience than straight enemy shooting. Including following a branching network of gates to sync back to the time dimension, and racing fast through a set of blockades. In certain encounters the player is advised to not shoot at all and stick to maneuvering and dodging hazards without engaging.

The level names were all chosen from x86 assembly instructions where each instruction's workings and purpose roughly describe the main challenge of the level.

=== Hyper Mode ===
Destroying enemies accumulates points towards Hyper Score, which is a set number of points that is different for each level. Upon finishing a level while reaching or exceeding its Hyper Score, a special Hyper Mode is unlocked for that level.

In Hyper Mode, the player controls a different space ship that has a considerably stronger weapon charge as well as faster maneuverability. However, it also starts with a single level of armor rather than three under normal mode. Armor regeneration power-ups only restore one level of armor instead of full restoration.

Because of these changes, levels in Hyper Mode are more challenging and intense than normal mode levels.

== Plot ==
It is the year 2960, roughly 300 years after the events of Wing Commander Prophecy. Humans expanded their territory in space to vast areas across many galaxies. The United Observatory Network (UON) being tasked with monitoring and recording incidents and effects of Super Nova explosions within or near human territories, one day records a Super Nova explosion in Alpha Centauri that exhibited certain unrecognizable patterns. Regardless, the explosion was filed as SN-2960rda and was left open for investigation.

Not short after, defense grids (outposts on the borders of human territories) began reporting increased concentrations of attacks from many races even that from those whom were not in conflict with humans. Puzzled by this sudden increase of aggressive (even suicidal) behavior, the United Defense Agency (UDA) put together a special fleet of 26 space ships of different specialties and capabilities, labeled between RM-1 and RM-26. The goal is to investigate the cause of the sudden universal hostility.

The player commands the RM-24 (combat and defense specialist), and takes off from one of the defense grids in the first level. As the RM-24 makes its first jump to a wormhole, it is immediately engaged by hostile attacks from other races space crafts.

As the fleet progresses in their recon mission, they gradually discover that the hostile behavior is instigated by a virus of organic matter somehow capable of infecting computer systems, driving them in hostile ways even if the space craft itself was not designed for combat. The virus is code-named IPA (short for Infinite Parallel Agents) and usually appears as a formless cloud of matter moving together.

RM-24 makes its first virus encounter in level 5 which causes the ship's systems to misbehave for a certain time before it gets cleaned out.

In level 9, RM-24 runs through the remnants of the Lexington (a carrier vessel from Wing Commander 4) which has been haunted by the virus, leading to the first major virus encounter in which it overtakes a disabled satellite orbital station and reactivates it to destroy the player.

Following the encounter, the fleet begins to trace the origins of the virus as well as ways to neutralize it. RM-24 finds itself in a second encounter with the IPA virus, only this time the virus is determined to take vengeance against RM-24 since the last encounter. The battle leads to the RM-24 losing connection to the time dimension.

After going through a time resync challenge, RM-24 re-establishes communication with what remained of the fleet to learn about the demise of most members. However, the fleet managed to trace the virus origins to Alpha Centauri where the SN-2960rda explosion occurred.

RM-24 makes its way to Alpha Centauri for one final confrontation with the IPA virus on the surface of a large battleship. The battle quickly unfolds to an impossible situation with IPA continually spreading and surrounding RM-24. RM-24 takes a last-hope move and jumps into a highly volatile wormhole that is about to collapse. The IPA virus, determined to bring down RM-24, follows it into the wormhole. As it takes the grip on RM-24, the space ship redirects all weapon energy to its thrusters and blasts out of the wormhole just in time before the wormhole collapses on itself, crushing the IPA virus along in the collapse.

RM-24 traces back its path to make contact with the remaining RM fleet before reporting back the success of the mission.

== Development ==
As the developers were employees at EA Montreal, development on the game started in April 2013 after the studio's closure date and made its first release on PlayStation 3 initially, then it followed on PlayStation 4 then on Xbox One. The game was done on the company's internal engine, which supported Windows PC only at the beginning of the project. Support for other platforms was added gradually which led to the individual consecutive releases. The project took one year and 10 months from start until the first release. It was entirely financed from the savings of the developers preferred this over going to a publisher and sacrificing on creative control. There were some government-funded programs, but the major ones had a cost of their own both in terms of time and money. So we settled with smaller local incentives which did not impose a lot of pressure or restrictions, but they did not cover more than the price of the PlayStation 3 devkit and a couple software licenses.

The game ran with all of its graphical features on PlayStation 3 at 60 FPS with 2x MSAA at HD resolution. The development team attributed this result to the use of their internally-developed engine.

Influences for the game came from a number of existing space-shooters, including Tempest, Salamander, Xenon 2, and Wing Commander which is referenced in the game's story.

== Reception ==
Reception

Aggregate scores
Aggregator	Score
GameRankings	67.50%
Metacritic	70/100

At Metacritic, which assigns a normalized rating out of 100 to reviews from mainstream critics, the game has received an average score of 70, based on 5 reviews indicating "Mixed or average reviews".

In general, the game was well identified as a good return to arcade gaming, as well as its high quality and smooth graphics.

The story was often criticized as being too obscure. However, the developers of the game mentioned that the intention of the story was to make it more of a trivia to players who do research rather than being an essential part to win the game.
