= Deadliest Warrior: Legends =

2011 fighting video game

- Developer: Pipeworks Software
- Publishers: 345 Games; Spike Games
- Platforms: Xbox Live Arcade; PlayStation Network
- Release: Xbox 360; July 6, 2011; PlayStation 3 July 26, 2011
- Genre: Fighting
- Modes: Single-player, multiplayer

Deadliest Warrior: Legends is a fighting game developed by Pipeworks Software and published by 345 Games & Spike Games. Based on the Spike documentary TV series Deadliest Warrior and the sequel to Deadliest Warrior: The Game, Deadliest Warrior: Legends allows players to take control of various individual warriors from different time periods, utilizing their own unique set of weapons, armor, and fight styles. The game was announced on April 7, 2011, by Spike Games, featuring a new campaign mode and a new line-up of playable warriors. On June 6, 2011, a gameplay trailer was released on E3 Live on GT. On July 6 the game was released for the Xbox 360's Xbox Live Arcade, and July 26 for the PlayStation 3's PlayStation Network.

== Gameplay ==
Much like Deadliest Warrior: The Game, Deadliest Warrior: Legends is a three-dimensional weapons-based fighting game with realistic damage. Each warrior is divided into three classes: the heavily armored champions, the aggressive berserkers, or the agile guerrillas. Each warrior has three different weapon categories: close range (one handed, e.g. sword), mid-range (two handed, e.g. pole arm) and long range (limited projectiles, e.g. javelins). Most of the combat is the same as the previous game, but a few changes were made. There is no longer a health bar, and the stamina, projectile count, and timer can be turned off entirely. Guerrillas no longer have a slow-acting poison for their secondary projectile weapon. The player can use the new push ability to kill their opponent by sending them down holes in some of the arenas, or to create distance between themself and the opponent. A new ability called grappling replaces special weapons, where if an attack connects, the player enter a mode similar to that of rock-paper-scissors. If the defending opponent matches the attacker's input, the attack is blocked, but if the defending opponent does not match the attacker's input, either a leg-break, arm-break, or execution is pulled off depending on the button chosen.

A new Risk-like mode called Generals was added, in which opposing warriors wage war by commanding their armies. The simulation engine used on season 3 of the show factors in each warrior's strengths and weaknesses (called X-factors), and applies them to the situation and environment at play. Each of the warriors (excluding Mack, who is not playable in this mode) have a playable map which covers one of their campaigns, where players must account for their warrior's abilities when it comes to particular terrains. Upon taking a fort with their troops, the player must defeat its warrior in hand-to-hand combat, or else the fort stays in their possession. Upon taking a neutral fort before the opponent does, the player receive one of three upgraded abilities. To win, the player must take over the opposing player's home fort, and best them in an individual battle.

== Warriors ==
If the player has a file of the previous game on their hard drive, they will have exclusive access to a variant of each warrior's starting short- or mid-range weapon. They can either be the warrior's personal weapon (the version of William Wallace's claymore used in Braveheart), or that of a related warrior (Tizona and the Sword of Goujian), all of which have the same stats as the corresponding starter weapon. Also unlockable are joke weapons, which cause little damage and are drawn from the history of each warrior. Warriors playable at launch are William Wallace and Shaka Zulu from season 1, Attila the Hun, Alexander the Great, Vlad the Impaler and Sun Tzu from season 2, with Genghis Khan, Hannibal, Hernán Cortés, and Joan of Arc from the third season. Joan of Arc and co-host Richard "Mack" Machowicz, who at first were only unplayable opponents, are playable through the DLC made available on August 10 for the Xbox 360 and on August 30 for the PS3.

== Reception ==
Reception

Aggregate score
Aggregator	Score	
Aggregator	PS3	Xbox 360
Metacritic	55/100	56/100

Review scores
Publication	Score	
Publication	PS3	Xbox 360
GamePro	N/A	3.5/5
GameSpot	4/10	4/10
GamesRadar+	N/A	1.5/5
IGN	7/10	7/10
Joystiq	N/A	4/5
Official Xbox Magazine (US)	N/A	4.5/10
Metro	N/A	4/10

The game received "mixed" reviews on both platforms according to the review aggregation website Metacritic.

== Compilation ==
On September 26, 2011, Spike confirmed a compilation of Deadliest Warrior: The Game and Deadliest Warrior: Legends on one disc called Deadliest Warrior: Ancient Combat. Additional content which was not in the original versions includes 30 new weapons (one for each of the three categories for the 10 Legends), a new Graveyard arena, and new gameplay modes. Also on disc are unreleased episodes from all three seasons of the show. It was scheduled to be released for the Xbox 360 and PlayStation 3 on December 6, 2011, but was pushed back to January 10, 2012, and later to April 17.
