= Deadliest Warrior: The Game =

2010 video game

- Download display art featuring five of the playable warriors. Left to right; Spartan, Samurai, Pirate, Knight and Ninja.
- Developer: Pipeworks Software
- Publisher: 345 Games
- Platforms: Xbox 360, PlayStation 3
- Release: Xbox 360; July 14, 2010; PlayStation 3 October 5, 2010
- Genre: Fighting
- Modes: Single-player, multiplayer

Deadliest Warrior: The Game is a fighting game developed by Pipeworks Software and published by 345 Games. Based on the Spike documentary TV series Deadliest Warrior, the game allows players to take control of various warriors from different time periods, utilizing their own unique set of weapons, armor, and fight styles. It was first released as a downloadable title for the Xbox 360's Xbox Live Arcade on July 14, 2010 and later for the PlayStation 3's PlayStation Network on October 5, 2010.

== Gameplay ==
The Viking (left) versus the Spartan (right), the Spartan having landed a strike on the undefended torso of the Viking, causing critical damage due to the realistic nature of attacks and damage.

Deadliest Warrior is a fighting game that pits two warriors from different time periods and locations in head-to-head combat in an open arena. Players are not restricted to a two-dimensional fighting plane like most fighting games and instead are allowed to move freely around the arena. Each warrior has a unique set of weapons and attributes that the player must utilize appropriately in order to defeat their opponent. There are three different warrior classes, each utilizing different tactics based on evasive, defensive, and offensive capabilities. Guerillas lack armor, thus being more vulnerable to attacks but are much quicker in their movement and attacks, plus have a slow acting poison for their alternate projectile weapon. Champions specialize in heavier attacks and are slow due their use of a shield or heavy armor. Beserkers have strong attacks, but have weaker armor than the Champions and are slower than the Guerillas.

Each warrior has four weapons sets for use in combat; close range (one-handed, may also include shield) and mid range (two-handed) melee weapons, along with a long range projectile, plus a special unblockable yet dodgeable attack with a special weapon. Players can switch between each weapon when necessary, except special weapons which are activated by a two-button combo. Long ranged weapons have a pre-set amount of ammunition ranging between one and five shots depending on the warrior and weapon, (some of which may be reloaded by picking up the shot projectile if it did not connect, and can conversely be broken by the opponent). Each warrior has two weapons for each category (excluding special weapons), which players can select before each battle, both with their own different stats based on damage, speed, and injury type (piercing, slashing, and crushing). There are also two sets of armor to choose from, both providing varying levels of speed and defense from the three damage types. For some warriors, however, the armor only affects their appearance, and does not have any defensive capabilities. Such warriors include the Apache, Ninja, Pirate, Shaolin Monk, and Zande.

The game features a more realistic weapons damage system of fighting where weapons can cause heavy amounts of damage, breaking or amputating limbs, and potentially even instantly impinge fatal wounds such as from a strong strike to the chest or being decapitated, which subsequently can lead to some fights lasting as little as a few seconds without proper defense. In instances where limbs can be broken, warriors are not defeated but are drastically hindered. A broken leg can significantly impair movement, while a broken arm can limit the player to the use of just their close-combat weapon, as shields, mid range, and long range weapons require two hands. Amputated arms also hinder the same way but will also cause the warrior to bleed out, diminishing their health rapidly before dying, thus being defeated. Throughout a battle, a warrior can perform a special strike in which time is briefly slowed down. If a special strike lands when their opponent is critically low on health, the victor will perform a violent finishing kill/execution.

The game features a single player arcade mode where the player battles eight warriors with their own chosen warrior that unlock the ability to select different weapons and armor before each battle. In addition to this, there are also standard one on one battles against a computer controlled or local human opponent. Challenge modes include survival, where players battle a constant stream of opponents, as well a mini-game where the player must slice through hanging pig carcasses in record time. Online multiplayer also allows one-on-one battles between human opponents, along with a tournament mode that can host multiple players at once.

=== Warriors ===
The original release of the game features eight playable warriors from different time periods; a 19th century Apache warrior, a Centurion of the Roman legion, a Medieval European Knight, a Ninja and a Samurai of feudal Japan, an 18th century Pirate, an ancient Spartan hoplite, and a late 1st millennium Viking. Seven of the warriors were profiled on the first season of the TV series, while the Roman Centurion was the sole subject from second season.

Following the game's release, three additional warriors were made available for play via downloadable content: a Rajput clan warrior of Medieval India, a Shaolin monk of the renowned Buddhist monastery, and a Zande tribal warrior of north central Africa.

== Development ==
The game was first announced at the Spike Video Game Awards held on December 12, 2009, which featured a teaser trailer showcasing a non-gameplay cinematic battle between the medieval knight and the ninja. The game was also present at the Game Developers Conference and at E3 2010. The initial concept was considered prior to actual development of the game due to what the senior director for digital business development at MTVN Entertainment Games Studio, Lucy Lathan stated "at its core, the concept of the show could have easily been made into a game before being a TV series". The television show itself was reported to have been popular when featured on both the Xbox 360's and PlayStation 3's online services, resulting in what was considered "a logical next step for the franchise". Despite being attached to an intellectual property, Lathan felt that the game would fare better is it appealed to both fans and non-fans while also not having development time tied to the premiere of the second series.

In choosing the warriors, creative director Prithvi Virasinghe said that it was "a combined effort between the show, the developers and the community", taking into account the most popular episodes. The developers deferred to using historical warriors as they felt that modern warriors, such as the special forces units profiled on the show, and in particular their contemporary firearms, would change the dynamics of the game too much. The pirate however does wield a firearm although the decision to include the pirate was apparently "touch and go... right until the last minute", but would later be included due to the design choice of limited ammunition for ranged weapons, along with the popular internet meme of "pirates versus ninjas". After 16 warriors were selected, they were further narrowed down to provide the "best match ups and differences in fighting style". Other characters would later be chosen again for potential downloadable-content.

The game drew inspiration from the 1997 Bushido Blade developed by Bergsala Lightweight, another 3D weapons-based fighting game that utilizes a more realistic approach to combat. Prithvi felt that the game would fare better if it worked for both casual and advanced players, that the game was "designed for easy pick up and play to appeal to casual gamers who want to get some quick carnage. The counter, guard break and parrying systems are there for the advanced players to master as well". As a result, the warriors were continuously tested against AI and human players in order to achieve proper balancing between warriors. Despite the violence, the developers wanted to keep it realistic with the combat, where even though players can perform executions, they did not want it to be similar to Mortal Kombat where fatalities were considered fanatical and exaggerated. The game features motion capture by the various martial artists who appear on the television series.

=== Downloadable content ===
Prior to release the developers wanted to include an option for downloadable content due to the selection process of warriors and the resulting cuts made. When the DLC was officially announced, Spike TV made a poll on their official website where users could vote for their favorite warrior, thus allowing fans of the show to decide on new warriors for the game. Despite the poll also featuring historical figures like William Wallace and Vlad the Impaler, Spike later confirmed that no famous individuals from the show would appear in the first DLC pack. During the Live Aftermath segment on August 20, 2010, new Deadliest Warrior host Richard "Mack" Machowicz revealed that the Rajput would be one of the first downloadable character, with a possible release date in early 2011.

The first DLC pack was officially announced at the 2010 Spike Video Game Awards and included three new warriors: the previously announced Rajput, the Shaolin Monk, and the Zande. This first DLC pack was scheduled for release on February 22, 2011 for both consoles but was delayed until February 24 for the Xbox 360.

== Reception ==
Reception

Aggregate score
Aggregator	Score
Metacritic	(PS3) 70/100 (X360) 56/100

Review scores
Publication	Score
1Up.com	(X360) D+
Eurogamer	(X360) 4/10
GameSpot	(X360) 6.5/10
GameZone	(X360) 6/10
Giant Bomb	(X360) 2/5
IGN	7/10
Joystiq	(X360) 4/5
Official Xbox Magazine (UK)	(X360) 5/10
Official Xbox Magazine (US)	(X360) 6.5/10
VideoGamer.com	(X360) 4/10

The game received "mixed or average reviews" on both platforms according to the review aggregation website Metacritic.

While the game was noted for its violent combat and premise, it was also criticized for the overly quick nature of combat and depth. Sales, however, were strong. "Interest in the game has exceeded our expectations on every level," Dan Yang, Senior Vice President of Spike Games told IGN. "This is most prominently reflected in our sales, where 'Deadliest Warrior: The Game' continues to be a top 10 best selling title on Xbox Live Arcade after a month."

== Sequel ==
On April 7, 2011 Spike Games announced a new game for the Deadliest Warrior franchise, called Deadliest Warrior: Legends, featuring a new campaign mode and a new line-up of playable warriors. Legends was developed by Pipeworks Software and being published by 345 Games, Spike and Comedy Central's video game division. It was released in mid-July 2011 on the PlayStation Network and Xbox Live Arcade. In 2013, 345 Games announced an extension of the franchise on Steam. Dan Yang, General Manager of 345 Games added: "Chivalry: Deadliest Warrior enhances the exceptional first-person combat style of Chivalry that is enjoyed by over a million players, by speeding up and broadening the gameplay. It also takes the Deadliest Warrior franchise from one-on-one combat to the battlefield."

== Compilation ==
On September 26, 2011, Spike confirmed a compilation of Deadliest Warrior: The Game and Deadliest Warrior: Legends on one disc called Deadliest Warrior: Ancient Combat. Additional content which was not in the original versions includes 30 new weapons (one for each of the three categories for the 10 Legends), a new Graveyard arena, and new gameplay modes. Also on disc are unreleased episodes from all three seasons of the show. It was scheduled to be released for the Xbox 360 and PlayStation 3 on December 6, 2011, but was pushed back to January 10, 2012, and later to April 17.
