= Dragon Fantasy =

2011 video game

- Developer: The Muteki Corporation
- Publisher: The Muteki Corporation
- Platforms: PlayStation Vita, PlayStation 3, PlayStation 4, iOS, Android, Microsoft Windows, Mac OS X, Wii U, Nintendo 3DS
- Release: Microsoft Windows: WW: December 2, 2011; Mac: WW: December 14, 2011; iOS: WW: August 25, 2011; Android: WW: July 16, 2012; Book I PlayStation 3, PlayStation Vita: NA: April 16, 2013; PAL: June 18, 2014; The Volumes of Westeria; Microsoft Windows, Linux, Mac: WW: April 9, 2015; Nintendo 3DS, Wii U: NA: July 23, 2015
- Genre: Role-playing
- Mode: Single-player

Dragon Fantasy is a retro-style role-playing video game developed by The Muteki Corporation. It was originally created for iOS, but was subsequently released for Mac, Microsoft Windows, and Android phones. On April 9, 2012, Sony Computer Entertainment of America announced on their blog that an enhanced "16-bit" version would be launching on PlayStation 3 and PlayStation Vita. The game was originally created as a homage to series designer Adam Rippon's late father, sculptor and professor Thomas Rippon, who died in December 2010.

Dragon Fantasy features classic Japanese role-playing game gameplay, including random battles, lengthy treasure-filled dungeons, and a story about a lone hero saving the world. The game features numerous homages to other games in the genre, most notably Final Fantasy and Dragon Quest, but also Lufia and EarthBound, among others.

With the release of Dragon Fantasy Book I and Dragon Fantasy Book II on PlayStation Network, an enhanced mode with updated 16-bit styled graphics and orchestrated audio was added. This enhanced mode may be turned on or off at any time to allow the player to experience the game as either a Nintendo Entertainment System-style or Super Nintendo Entertainment System-style game. The compiled Volumes of Westeria that is available for Nintendo 3DS since mid-2015, via digital download on the Nintendo eShop, includes this feature as well.

Dragon Fantasy: The Black Tome of Ice (Book II), was released on March 22, 2016, for PlayStation Vita, PlayStation 3 and PlayStation 4 systems. It was released for the Wii U on May 26, 2016.

== Plot ==
Dragon Fantasy Book I features three canonical chapters, plus one intermission chapter based on Minecraft.

Chapter One, "Dragon Fantasy", centers around the character Ogden, who is based on the series creator's father Thomas Rippon, a diminished former hero getting back into the business of saving the world. It also sets up many of the characters and themes for the rest of the game.

Chapter Two, "The Heir Unapparent", tells the parallel story of Prince Anders, brother of Prince Marlon, who was kidnapped at the beginning of Chapter One. During his travels, Anders discovers an important artifact that becomes central to the story in the sequel, Dragon Fantasy Book II.

Chapter Three, "Operation Desert Plunder", introduces new characters Jerald and Ramona, a thief and his niece escaping the desert empire of Sandheim. They rob a ship that Anders and Ogden are traveling in, and find the artifact discovered in Chapter Two, to their great peril.

Finally, Intermission M features a non-canon side-story about the heroes traveling to a Minecraft server and retrieving Notch's magic Swedish hat from an Ender Dragon in order to return to the real world. It was created in honor of the game's first appearance at a convention during Minecon in 2011.
