= Ion Assault =

2009 multidirectional shooter video game

- Developer: Coreplay
- Publishers: Black Inc. BitComposer Games (PC)
- Platforms: Xbox 360 (XBLA), Microsoft Windows, PlayStation Network
- Release: September 23, 2009
- Genre: Multidirectional shooter
- Modes: Single-player, multiplayer

Ion Assault is a multidirectional shooter video game developed by Coreplay and published by Black Inc. for the Xbox Live Arcade, PlayStation Network, and Microsoft Windows. It was released in North America and Europe on September 23, 2009. Its gameplay is similar to that of the classic arcade shooter Asteroids. Ion Assault was the first Xbox Live Arcade game to be developed in Germany.

Ion Assault was released for Windows on the Steam platform on November 17, 2010. It was delisted in 2015, but got relisted in 2018 for Xbox 360 and in 2019 for Steam.

== Reception ==
Reception

Aggregate score
Aggregator	Score
Metacritic	PC: 62/100; X360: 74/100

Review scores
Publication	Score
Eurogamer	8/10
GameRevolution	3/10
GameSpot	7/10
GamesRadar+	3.5/5
GameZone	7/10
IGN	7.8/10
TeamXbox	8/10

Ion Assault received mixed reviews from critics. On Metacritic, the game holds scores of 62/100 for the PC version based on 4 reviews and 74/100 for the Xbox 360 version based on 23 reviews. It received praise for its graphics, particle effects and gameplay (including the recharging mechanic for the main weapon), but received criticism for its controls, short campaign and screen clutter during intense battles.
