= Disney Sing It =

2008 video game

Sing It
- Developer: Zoë Mode
- Publisher: Disney Interactive Studios
- Designer: Disney Interactive Studios
- Platforms: PlayStation 2, PlayStation 3, Wii, Xbox 360, Microsoft Windows
- Release: NA: October 21, 2008
- Genre: Karaoke
- Modes: Single-player, multiplayer

Disney Sing It is a karaoke video game. It was released on October 21, 2008 for the PlayStation 2, PlayStation 3, Wii, Xbox 360 and Microsoft Windows.

It's the second game in the Disney Sing It series after High School Musical: Sing It!. The game features 35 songs from Disney-affiliated artists and Disney Channel productions like Hannah Montana, Camp Rock, Aly & AJ, Miley Cyrus and the Jonas Brothers. It also features a selection of songs from the High School Musical franchise and a "Singing lessons" mode with Olesya Rulin as a vocal coach.

The game has received mixed reviews, with both 1UP.com and IGN praising its accessibility towards kids but finding serious fault with the gameplay, with Official Xbox Magazine ultimately calling it a "gateway game" at best.

It was followed by a third game, Disney Sing It! – High School Musical 3: Senior Year.

== See also ==
- High School Musical: Sing It!
- Disney Sing It! – High School Musical 3: Senior Year
- Disney Sing It: Pop Hits
- Disney Sing It: Party Hits
- Disney Sing It: Family Hits
