= Disorder 6 =

2013 video game

- Developer(s): 5pb.
- Publisher(s): 5pb.
- Producer(s): Kazuhiro Ichikawa; Hajime Kanasugi
- Designer(s): Megumi Nagahama
- Platform(s): PlayStation 3, Xbox 360
- Release: JP: August 22, 2013
- Genre(s): Adventure, visual Novel
- Mode(s): Single-player

Disorder6 (Note: Disorder6 (Japanese: ディスオーダー シックス, Hepburn: Disuōdā shikkusu)) is a suspense visual novel video game developed and published by 5pb. for the PlayStation 3 and Xbox 360. The game is a sequel to Dunamis15 in Suspense-fiction Adventure series, and it was released in Japan on August 22, 2013, featuring six chapters and 8 endings.

== Synopsis ==
Disorder6 is set in the same world as Dunamis15, and uses similar gameplay. The game has six chapters, each going through memories from the perspective of a main character.

=== Characters ===
Jō "Joe" (ジョー)
Voiced by: Kensho Ono
The main character of the game. An indecisive boy who has a weak will, he has just lost his memories.

Shiina "Sheena" (シーナ)
Voiced by: Saori Hayami
The main heroine and the girl who is chained to Jō. Just like Jō, she has just lost her memory. A girl who wears punk-rock style clothing, she has multiple personality disorder and isn't aware of these personalities.

Marika (マリカ)

An aggressive sadist, she treats everyone and especially Jō as her servants, to the point of even making him go onto the ground so she could walk on him.

Hayato (ハヤト)

The male personality. He has a snobbish personality and has the tendency to punch anyone who annoys him, even if it's a woman.

Yuno (ユーノ)

The young child personality. She acts completely like a spoiled and selfish 5-year-old. Although really energetic, she begins to act violently when she gets hungry.

Navi (ナヴィ)

A lethargic taciturn. She always mutters negative things and has a really quiet voice to the point of people thinking she doesn't even exist.

Hinako (ヒナコ)
Voiced by: Asami Sanada
Head of her family, Hinako is a woman with red hair. She is also a co-worker of Jō's.

== Reception ==
Reception

Review score
Publication	Score
Famitsu	30/40

Famitsu gave the game their silver award.
