= Gundemonium Collection =

Set of three shoot'em ups

Gundemonium Collection is a set of three shoot'em ups created by indie developer Platine Dispositif, consisting of Gundemonium, GundeadliGne, and Hitogata Happa. English language versions were released on Steam and the PlayStation Network by publisher Rockin' Android on August 4, 2010. Destructoid explains "All the games have Trophies to collect and include a feature that allows uploading your play sessions to YouTube." According to Metro, "There is a back story that links all three games".

== Reception ==
Metro summed up its review of the collection by saying "They don't call it bullet hell for nothing and although these three games are all good examples of the genre the high difficulty level will prove far too much for the uninitiated.", rating it a 7/10. PSN Stores liked the "frenzied 'bullet hell' shmup action", constant framerate, easy snapshot, YouTube functionality, and multiple gameplay modes. The site disliked the confusing HUD and hit detection, the fact that only one of the titles had 2 player co-op, and that "some of the modes are ludicrously difficult".
