= Daisenryaku Perfect HD =

2014 strategy video game

- Cover art for the game.
- Developer: SystemSoft Alpha
- Publisher: SystemSoft Alpha
- Series: Daisenryaku
- Platform: PlayStation 3
- Release: 6 February 2014
- Genre: Turn-based strategy
- Modes: Single-player, Multiplayer

Daisenryaku Perfect HD (大戦略PERFECT 戦場の覇者 Daisenryaku Perfect: Senjou no Hasha) is a turn-based strategy game released by SystemSoft Alpha for the PlayStation 3 on 6 February 2014.

== Gameplay ==
Daisenryaku Perfect HD is a Turn-Based military simulation set in the modern era. A player can choose a country to start off as and ally or attack others. The player has 22 countries to select from, each with their own different set of strengths and weaknesses to utilize and try to strengthen. There are 600 units spread across all the countries that act as their realistic counterparts would in the real world. To add to this, each individual unit can gain experience and level up, much like an RPG, and this will give units increased accuracy, defense, and other bonuses.

The game will also be the first in the series to feature online multiplayer for consoles, and will still allow for local multiplayer as well. There can be up to eight people in one session, with anyone being able to ally with computer controlled countries or with other players. There is no limit or rule for how many people can ally. There can be two teams of four, four teams of two, or even 7 against one if players wish it.

=== Factions ===
Daisenryaku Perfect HD features 22 different countries for players to command or conquer such countries include but or not limited to:

- United States
- Great Britain
- France
- Russia
- Japan
- Israel
- China
- Germany
- Australia

=== Units ===
There are over 600 units varying from infantry to vehicles that act correspondingly to their real life counterparts. There also are more fictitious units such as dragons, Pokémon (pocket monsters), Emo style soldiers, miniature armoured unicorns and spaceships at the players disposal within custom matches.

=== Editors ===
Daisenryaku Perfect HD also features a map, rules, weapon, nation, terrain, and unit editor.
