= Eat Them! =

2010 video game

- Developer: FluffyLogic
- Publisher: Sony Computer Entertainment
- Platform: PlayStation 3
- Release: NA: 21 December 2010; PAL: 6 July 2011
- Genre: Action
- Modes: Single-player, multiplayer

Eat Them! is a video game developed by British company FluffyLogic and published by Sony Computer Entertainment for PlayStation 3. The game is a spiritual successor to Rampage. It was ported to Japan for release under the name Eat Them! Hakase no Ikareru Monster (Eat Them！ 〜博士の怒れるモンスター〜, Eat Them! 〜Hakase no Ikareru Monsutā〜) on July 20, 2011.

== Reception ==
Reception

Aggregate score
Aggregator	Score
Metacritic	65/100

Review scores
Publication	Score
Edge	5/10
Eurogamer	6/10
GamesMaster	79%
GameSpot	6/10
GamesRadar+	3.5/5
GameZone	6.5/10
IGN	6.5/10
PlayStation: The Official Magazine	7/10
Push Square	5/10
VideoGamer.com	8/10

The game received "mixed" reviews according to the review aggregation website Metacritic.

VideoGamer.com thought the title was "brilliant", though they felt it could use more variation in its gameplay. GamesMaster called it "cel-shaded 3D take on arcade classic Rampage". GamesRadar+ thought the game was "fresh, fun, and satisfying". PlayStation: The Official Magazine felt that "repetitive objectives and frustrating difficulty spikes mean this monster meal is more junk food than solid nutrition." GameZone was disappointed by the game's multiplayer and health system, but appreciated the attention to detail by the developers. IGN thought the game had a "cool" idea, but that it was let down by its repetitive "smash stuff" game mechanics. Eurogamer thought the U.S. import's visual style was reminiscent of beautiful comic books. GameSpot felt that the stagnancy of the objectives and difficulty held the game back. Push Square, however, felt that the game's weak mission design, cumbersome controls and repetitive nature restrict it from being a long-standing source of entertainment. Edge felt that the U.S. import's core idea was sound, and that "when it works it's undeniable fun".
