= Disney Sing It: Family Hits =

2010 video game

- Developer: Zoë Mode
- Publisher: Disney Interactive Studios
- Series: Disney Sing It
- Platforms: PlayStation 3 Wii
- Release: August 3, 2010
- Genre: Karaoke
- Modes: Single-player; Multiplayer

Disney Sing It: Family Hits is a karaoke video game developed by Zoë Mode and published by Disney Interactive Studios for the PlayStation 3 and Wii.

== Reception ==
Reception

Review scores
Publication	Score
IGN	6.5/10
Newsday	5/5
The San Francisco Examiner	3/5
Slant Magazine	3/5
Jeuxvideo.com	10/20

IGN gave the game a score of 6.5 out of 10, stating: "If this game had an online store, or any community features, I could recommend it to everyone, but it really just doesn't have enough to stay fun for more than a night or two"
