= Hasbro Family Game Night (video game) =

2008 video game

- PlayStation 2 PAL version cover art.
- Developer: EA Bright Light
- Publishers: Electronic Arts; Encore Software (Windows)
- Composer: Richard Jacques
- Platforms: PlayStation 2, Wii, Xbox 360, PlayStation 3, Nintendo DS, Windows
- Release: PlayStation 2, Wii: NA: November 11, 2008; AU: November 20, 2008; EU: November 21, 2008; Xbox 360: WW: March 18, 2009 (Xbox Live Arcade); NA: November 10, 2009; EU: November 13, 2009; PlayStation 3: WW: October 29, 2009; Nintendo DS: NA: October 26, 2009; AU: November 5, 2009; EU: November 6, 2009; Microsoft Windows: NA: August 20, 2010
- Genre: Party
- Modes: Single-player, multiplayer

Hasbro Family Game Night is a 2008 party video game developed by EA Bright Light and published by Electronic Arts for the PlayStation 2 and Wii in November 2008, before being ported to the Xbox 360 and PlayStation 3 the following year with similar, un-related games of the same name being released for the Nintendo DS and Microsoft Windows. The game adapts a selection of popular Hasbro board games into a video game form, with both classic and enhanced versions of each game available to play. The game was named after the company's "Family Game Night" marketing campaign, which aimed for families to bond together while playing board games.

While receiving mainly mixed reviews upon release by critics, the game and marketing campaign were a commercial success for Hasbro and Electronic Arts. This allowed the two companies to produce a franchise featuring three additional video game entries, while a game show of the same name aired on The Hub from 2010 until 2014.

== Gameplay ==
Hasbro Family Game Night is a party video game which adapts six classic Hasbro board games in a single disc package, with Mr. Potato Head as the game's host. The game is set within a simple game room where the games will form up when chosen, with Mr. Potato Head flying around on a jetpack. The games are chosen through a robotic-style menu featuring the cover art of the game, whose design depends on the region. The game room can be customized with one of four different themes, while completing objectives can unlock new furniture and themes for the room, alongside trophies. In the options, the player can also choose wherever they want Mr. Potato Head to be enabled or not, in addition to wherever game tips show up while playing.

The games all have traditional versions as well as "advanced" variants exclusive to the video game. The Wii version utilizes motion controls with the Wii Remote for its gameplay, while the other versions use standard button controls.

The Xbox 360 version added online play through Xbox Live and widescreen support. The same applies to the PlayStation 3 version, but with its online play being through PlayStation Network. The online servers for the game were shut down in April 2012. Both versions also add Achievement (Xbox 360)/Trophy (PlayStation 3) support.

== Games ==
The games included are Battleship, Yahtzee, Boggle, Connect Four, Sorry! and Sorry! Sliders. Scrabble was added for the Xbox 360 and PlayStation 3 versions exclusively for the North American release (as Mattel holds the rights to the game outside North America). The Xbox 360 version also has Connect 4x4, Jenga, and Pictureka! as extra downloadable games, each of which came from its sequel Hasbro Family Game Night 2.

The DS version of the game contains four titles, each from this game (Battleship and Connect Four) and the sequel (Operation and Bop It).

The Windows version, on the other hand, is a package title containing six previously-released casual games previously made available on Pogo.com and casual game portals like Big Fish Games. The titles available in this version of the game are Cluedo, The Game of Life, Monopoly, Operation Mania, Pictureka! Museum Mayhem and Yahtzee.

== Development and release ==
On August 10, 2007, Hasbro announced that they had entered into a new worldwide strategic licensing agreement with Electronic Arts that would allow the publisher to develop and publish games based on a majority of Hasbro intellectual properties, including Monopoly, Littlest Pet Shop and Yahtzee, from 2008 until 2013. EA's Hasbro titles would be targeted towards all platforms, including console, PC, and mobile, and were the first major deal formed by EA's Casual Entertainment division after being created in June. This new agreement followed the ending of a prior seven-year deal Hasbro held with Atari for select Hasbro board games, which, due to their financial problems, had ended the deal after only three years - selling back the rights for $19.5 million.

Electronic Arts announced its first video games under the new deal in February 2008. In May, the company officially announced the release of Hasbro Family Game Night for the Wii and PlayStation 2, which would include over six Hasbro board games. The game would be targeted towards kids and families, and would see a Fall release window for the two systems. The game was officially released in November.

In January 2009, Electronic Arts announced that the game would be ported to the Xbox 360 as a "channel" application on Xbox Live Arcade. The Xbox 360 version would also include Scrabble for its North American release in addition to the six other games, with EA citing its inclusion due to its popularity as a casual game on Pogo.com. The game was released on March 18, 2009, initially having four games available for purchase for 800 Microsoft Points each with the other three games being available on May 27, 2009. The Xbox 360 version features higher-quality graphics, online functionalities and Avatar support. In November 2009, a physical version was released, which included all six/seven games on a single disc.

A PlayStation 3 version was released digitally through the PlayStation Store on October 29, 2009. This version of the game is a port of the Xbox 360 version with Scrabble included in the North American release. However, it is not a "channel" application but rather the full game, as with the PlayStation 2 and Wii versions.

The Nintendo DS version was announced alongside the release of its Wii-exclusive sequel in May 2009, including two games from each instalment.

In April 2010, Electronic Arts announced that an additional three titles would be made available for the Xbox 360 version in the summer. The Wii version was re-released as a single-disc bundle with the second game on November 9, 2010, entitled Hasbro Family Game Night Value Pack.

== Reception ==
The Wii version of the game received mainly mixed reviews. The review aggregator site Metacritic has an average score of 63%, based on 12 reviews. IGN rated it as 7 out of 10 ("Decent"), and said that control and interpretation issues cause problems for some of the games. Games Master UK magazine said: "Overall, this does everything you'd want it to (and no more)". IT Reviews concluded about the Xbox 360 version: "We would pass on Battleship, which just didn't hold our attention and had fairly weak variants. Connect 4 is worth a pop, though, with alternative play modes that really bring the game to life, and Yahtzee is certainly a little gem for the asking price".

In February 2010, Electronic Arts announced that both Hasbro Family Game Night and Hasbro Family Game Night 2 had sold a combined one million units.
