= Family Game Night =

Family Game Night may refer to:

- Family Game Night (TV series), an American television game show
- Hasbro Family Game Night, a video game released by Electronic Arts featuring Hasbro board games
- Family Game Night 2, a sequel to the Hasbro video game and second in the series
- Family Game Night 3, a sequel to the Hasbro video game and third in the series
- Family Game Night 4, a sequel to the Hasbro video game and fourth in the series

== See also ==
- Family game (disambiguation)
- Game Night (disambiguation)
