= Game Night =

Game Night may refer to:

- GameNight, radio show
- Game Night (film), a 2018 American dark comedy film starring Jason Bateman and Rachel McAdams
- "Game Night" (Adventure Time: Side Quests)
- "Game Night" (Brooklyn Nine-Nine)
- "Game Night" (How I Met Your Mother)
- "Game Night" (Milo Murphy's Law)
- Game Night (web series)

== See also ==
- Family Game Night (disambiguation)
