= Shox =

2002 video game

- Developer: EA UK
- Publisher: EA Sports BIG
- Director: Matt Birch
- Producer: Nick Channon
- Programmer: Rajan Tande
- Artist: David Kenyon
- Platform: PlayStation 2
- Release: EU: September 27, 2002; AU: October 31, 2002; NA: November 12, 2002
- Genre: Racing
- Modes: Single-player, multiplayer

Shox (also known as Shox: Rally Reinvented) is an arcade rally racing video game developed by EA UK and published by Electronic Arts under the EA Sports BIG label in North America and Europe for the PlayStation 2 in fall of 2002. Shox features 24 licensed vehicles from real-life makers like Audi, Mini, Toyota, Mitsubishi, Subaru, Lancia, and Ford. The game introduced a unique concept, "Shox Zones". Within each track there are specially designated areas, or "Shox Zones" where players are awarded Bronze, Silver, and Gold placements based on their driving skills.

== Gameplay ==
Shox: Rally Reinvented features three environments where all tracks are based upon: Arid (a desert-like, sandy environment), Jungle (a densely vegetated, muddy environment), and Ice (an arctic, snowy and icy environment). In every track, there are three "Shox Zones", areas the player must cross while being timed. When the player reaches the end of a Shox Zone, the player is rewarded with cash based on the time taken to cross it, divided into Gold, Silver and Bronze. However, if the player takes too long to cross the zone, beyond the Bronze time, a reward will not be given. Shox doesn't feature the genre's traditional gameplay modes. Instead of time trial, single race, and career modes, Shox has only one: the championship mode where players take one of 24 cars through 30 different races that are spread across five unique leagues. Shox features licensed rally cars, ranging from the Subaru Impreza WRC, Porsche Cayenne Turbo and Mitsubishi Lancer Evolution, which all feature visual damage and dirt from the tracks. The handling is very arcade oriented. Winning races earns money, which pays for car repairs or new cars. Multiplayer can be played with up to four-player splitscreen, either with races or capture the flag modes. There is also an option to split each controller so four players can be played with only two controllers.

Shox also features the concept of a "Shox Wave", a sort of shockwave that follows the track ahead of the player's car if they successfully pass, within Gold time, through all three Shox Zones, and is activated on the next 'checkpoint' (for lack of a better word) (it is not necessary to achieve Gold time in each Shox Zone within a single lap). During the duration of its presence, the player continually earns cash, but the Shox Zone system is temporarily disabled. The objective of the Shox Wave, should it be activated, is to drive fast enough to catch up to it before it reaches the next checkpoint. While approaching the Shox Wave, the screen will appear increasingly blurry and distorted and make driving at high speed more difficult. Should the player fail to catch up in time, the Shox Wave will disappear and the Shox Zone system will resume. On the other hand, if the player succeeds, the Shox Wave will speed ahead of the player upon passing the checkpoint, for the player to catch up to again.

== Development ==
Electronic Arts announced that an off-road rally car racer was in development for the PlayStation 2 at E3 2002. The game was developed by EA UK studio. Development reportedly took only eight months as the GameCube version was eventually scrapped in favor of a holiday season release. The game used the game engine from F1 2002. Described as a cross between Rally Cross and Ridge Racer, Shox is part of the EA Sports BIG lineup, which targeted casual gamers with slick presentation and over-the-top arcade-style gameplay.

In Japan, the game was released under the name Rally Shox (ラリーショックス, Rarī Shokkusu) and was released on January 9, 2003. This version was published by Electronic Arts Square under the EA Games label instead of the EA Sports BIG label.

== Reception ==
Reception

Aggregate score
Aggregator	Score
Metacritic	78/100

Review scores
Publication	Score
Edge	6/10
Electronic Gaming Monthly	7/10
Eurogamer	7/10
Famitsu	30/40
Game Informer	7.25/10
GameSpot	7.9/10
GameSpy	4/5
GameZone	7.6/10
IGN	7.8/10
Official U.S. PlayStation Magazine	3.5/5
X-Play	3/5

The game received "generally favorable reviews" according to the review aggregation website Metacritic. Famitsu gave it a score of 30 out of 40. GamePro said of the game, "Groan if you must, but Shox... rocks." (Note: GamePro gave the game three 4.5/5 scores for graphics, control, and fun factor, and 3/5 for sound.)
