= Hasbro Family Game Night =

Video game series adapting popular board games

- Genre: Virtual board game
- Developer: EA Bright Light
- Publisher: Electronic Arts
- Platforms: PlayStation 2, Wii, PlayStation 3, Nintendo DS, Xbox 360, Microsoft Windows
- First release: Hasbro Family Game Night; November 11, 2008
- Latest release: Family Game Night 4: The Game Show; November 1, 2011

Hasbro Family Game Night is a series of party video games published by Electronic Arts that adapt board games manufactured by Hasbro, and is named after the company's then-advertising campaign of the same name. There were four entries in the series, released yearly between 2008 and 2011.

== Hasbro Family Game Night ==
Hasbro Family Game Night is the first installment in the series, developed by EA Bright Light. The game contains six to ten adaptations of popular board games produced by the company, with classic and enhanced versions of each being available.

== Hasbro Family Game Night 2 ==
Hasbro Family Game Night 2
- Developer: EA Bright Light
- Publisher: Electronic Arts
- Platforms: Wii, Xbox 360
- Release: Wii: NA: October 26, 2009; AU: November 5, 2009; EU: November 6, 2009; Xbox 360: NA: November 1, 2011
- Genre: Party

Hasbro Family Game Night 2 is the second entry in the series, once again developed by EA Bright Light. It was originally released for the Wii and later for the Xbox 360.

=== Gameplay ===
Family Game Night 2 is once again set within a room-like setting, which is fully customizable to the player's content through unlockable objects that become available by completing objectives in the featured games. Mr. Potato Head returns as the game's host, and he can also be customized with unlockable clothing. The game supports Miis as playable characters, and contains five Hasbro board games - Operation, Pictureka!, Connect 4x4, Jenga and Bop It!. The Xbox 360 version is identical in content, but uses Xbox Avatars as playable characters instead of Miis due to Nintendo's protection of its intellectual property.

The game also includes a game show styled party mode with Mr. Potato Head as the host.

While the game was not initially released for the Xbox 360 or the PlayStation 3, Pictureka!, Jenga, and Connect 4x4 were added as downloadable content to the original game on June 23, 2010.

=== Release ===
In May 2009, Electronic Arts announced that they would release a sequel to Family Game Night, effectively titled Family Game Night 2, in the fall for the Wii and Nintendo DS, of which the latter would be a "best of" compilation.

The game was re-released with the first entry as part of the Hasbro Family Game Night Value Pack on November 9, 2010, where both entries were bundled together on a single disc. It was re-released again on November 1, 2011, as Hasbro Family Game Night Fun Pack, this time with the third entry. It was also released on the Xbox 360, which marked the full game's debut on the latter system.

== Hasbro Family Game Night 3 ==
Hasbro Family Game Night 3
- Developer: EA Bright Light
- Publisher: Electronic Arts
- Platforms: Wii, Xbox 360, PlayStation 3
- Release: Wii, PlayStation 3: NA: October 26, 2010; AU: October 28, 2010; EU: October 29, 2010; Xbox 360: NA: October 26, 2010; EU: November 5, 2010; AU: November 18, 2010
- Genre: Party

Hasbro Family Game Night 3 is the third entry in the series, once again developed by EA Bright Light, and released for the Wii, Xbox 360 and PlayStation 3.

=== Gameplay ===
Family Game Night 3 takes place on an island, with a Resort style setting. This time round, the player can choose either Mr. or Mrs. Potato Head as their host, who is once again fully customizable with unlockable accessories and clothing. The game includes five Hasbro board games: Mouse Trap, Twister, The Game of Life, Clue, and Yahtzee Hands Down. Each game features both the original version and a remix version that changes up the gameplay.

Miis and Xbox Avatars return as the playable characters for the Wii and Xbox 360 versions, while the PlayStation 3 uses a custom avatar maker in its place.

=== Release ===
A third entry in the series was teased in EA's release cycle for the fiscal year 2011. The game was officially announced in May 2010 for a fall release, as with the prior entries.

The game was re-released as a single-disc package with the second entry as part of the Hasbro Family Game Night Fun Pack for the Wii and the Xbox 360 on November 1, 2011.

== Family Game Night 4: The Game Show ==
Family Game Night 4: The Game Show
- Developer: Wahoo Studios (Note: Additional development by EA Salt Lake)
- Publisher: Electronic Arts
- Platforms: Wii, Xbox 360, PlayStation 3
- Release: NA: November 1, 2011; AU: November 3, 2011; EU: November 4, 2011
- Genre: Party

Hasbro Family Game Night 4: The Game Show is the fourth and final entry in the series, released for the PlayStation 3, Wii, and Xbox 360. This installment is a lot different than the previous entries; it was developed by Wahoo Studios instead of EA Bright Light, and was based on the series' TV game show adaptation on The Hub. Its host Todd Newton supplied the game's commentary.

=== Gameplay ===
The game is based on the first season of the game show, and adapts several games from it: Bop It! Boptagon, Connect 4 Basketball, Scrabble Flash/Boggle Flash, Sorry! Sliders and Yahtzee Bowling. As with Family Game Night 3, the Wii and Xbox 360 versions use Miis and Xbox Avatars as playable characters, while the PlayStation 3 version uses its own avatars.

The PlayStation 3 and Xbox 360 versions add motion controller support (PlayStation Move and Kinect), of which the functionality was previously exclusively used in the Wii version using the Wii Remote, like with the prior installments. Unlike the previous entries, this one lacks an online mode due to the game being released as a $40 budget title and thus ineligible to be included on EA's online pass.

=== Reception ===
The game received mainly mixed to negative reviews. The Xbox 360 and Wii versions were the highest rated versions on Gamerankings, with scores of 37% while the PS3 version was slightly below them at 35%. Push Square claimed that the game was much more fun with another person, but was still "a harsh drop off in quality compared to other Hasbro Family Game Night titles" and gave the game a 3/10. Official Xbox Magazine UK gave it a 3/10, claiming that the games were poorly represented and saying: "This casts doubt on whether Hasbro understand what makes its non-digital games good. Whatever the reasons behind FGN4 - this is reprehensible".

== Successors ==
While Hasbro would continue to work with Electronic Arts for mobile games, Hasbro would sign a new console deal with Ubisoft in August 2013. In October 2015 the company released a compilation title entitled Hasbro Family Fun Pack for the PlayStation 4 and Xbox One. The title includes four games that had previously been released digitally: Trivial Pursuit LIVE, Monopoly Plus, Risk and Scrabble (Boggle for Non-NA releases). It was followed up with Hasbro Family Fun Pack: Conquest Edition for the same systems in November 2016. It was identical to its predecessor but replaced Trivial Pursuit LIVE and Risk with Battleship and Risk Urban Assault. Another compilation for the Nintendo Switch was released in October 2018, entitled Hasbro Game Night, which bundled the Switch download versions of Trivial Pursuit LIVE, Monopoly and Risk.
