= Spare Parts (video game) =

2011 video game

- Cover art
- Developer: EA Bright Light
- Publisher: Electronic Arts
- Designer: Gary Nappers
- Artist: Lee Sullivan
- Composers: Christian Henson; Alexis Smith; Joe Henson
- Platforms: PlayStation 3 (PSN); Xbox 360 (XBLA)
- Release: PlayStation 3: NA: January 18, 2011; PAL: January 19, 2011; Xbox 360; January 19, 2011
- Genre: Platform
- Modes: Single-player, multiplayer

Spare Parts is a platform video game developed by EA Bright Light and published by Electronic Arts. It features cooperative gameplay for up to two players. Players can unlock new abilities which can be upgraded, and can also unlock new characters to play as. The story revolves around a pair of robots which become stranded on a planet by a race known as the Krofax. As the robots explore the planet they discover an abandoned spaceship. The ship's computer (voiced by Simon Pegg) informs them that they can find the parts necessary to repair the ship scattered throughout the planet. The robots then set off to find the necessary parts in the hopes of escaping the planet.

The game received mediocre reception from reviewers, who gave generally high remarks for the presentation of the game, with some commenting on the bright colors of the environment and voice acting by Simon Pegg as points of praise. Gameplay was subject to mixed reception from critics. While some critics enjoyed the simplicity of the combat, others felt it did not engage the player enough to be enjoyable. Negative comments were also directed towards the game's camera system; critics felt that the fixed camera did not allow the freedom of similar platform games. In its first two weeks, Spare Parts moved over 15,000 units. That number increased to over 34,000 units as of year-end 2011.

== Gameplay ==
Spare Parts is a platform game featuring robots.

Spare Parts is a platform game. It features local and online cooperative gameplay, and players can drop in and out on the fly. The game features incentives for cooperative play, such as special moves that can only be executed with two players. The game does not feature an AI companion when playing single player. The game has an average play length of between five and seven hours to complete the game, with approximately ten hours to reach 100% completion.

The player characters can be upgraded with different items which enhance abilities or grant new ones, such as x-ray vision, power arms, which allow the character to lift heavy objects, and rocket boots which allow temporary flight. Items acquired can be upgraded via in-game currency found throughout the game. Additionally, during cooperative games players may receive bonuses when certain items are equipped and in use simultaneously. Players will also be tasked with rescuing other robots stranded on the planet. Once found and repaired, players can use these robots to play through the game.

== Synopsis ==
The story is set around a pair of robots, Mar-T and Chip, who become stranded on a junkyard planet by an alien race known as the Krofax. As they journey they discover an abandoned spacecraft. Con-Rad, the ship's computer, informs the pair that the planet contains enough spare parts to repair the ship, but they are scattered throughout the landscape. The duo then set off to acquire the parts needed to be able to repair it and leave the planet.

Mar-T and Chip journey across the planet, rescuing other stranded robots and recovering parts for the craft. Shortly after exiting one of the planet's caves the robots learn from Con-Rad that the Krofax have constructed a surface-to-air laser that will destroy the ship upon takeoff if not disabled. Con-Rad further reveals that the Krofax leader, Lord Krung, wants to capture the spaceship and use Con-Rad's technologies for nefarious purposes. The robotic pair sabotage the laser which fires lethal shot to Lord Krung's cruiser as it explodes. Awakening on the surface of the planet, Krung sets the self-destruct on what remains of his vessel, threatening to destroy the entire planet.

Krung is confronted within the remains of his ship. The robotic duo defeat the Krofax leader and disarm the self-destruct. Krung makes an attempt at escape, however he and his minions defeated just outside by Mar-T and Chip. Krung drops the final crucial part for Con-Rad's spacecraft, and the robots return to the ship and begin their escape from the planet. As the vessel begins to leave orbit, Con-Rad detects movement in the hangar bay; Lord Krung survived their recent battle and has stowed away. Mar-T and Chip open the cargo bay doors, depressurizing the cargo bay. The equip their magnetic boots and eject Krung from the ship, victorious.

== Development and marketing ==
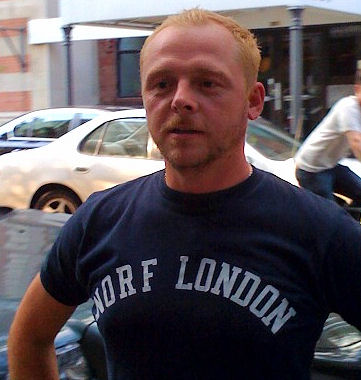
Simon Pegg provides the voice for Con-Rad, the ship's computer.

Spare Parts was developed by EA Bright Light and published by Electronic Arts. It was announced June 11, 2010 and subsequently shown three days later at the Electronic Entertainment Expo. The ship's computer is voiced by English actor Simon Pegg, known for the lead role in Shaun of the Dead. Pegg cited HAL 9000 from the Space Odyssey series, Mother from the film Alien, and GERTY from the film Moon as inspirations for his character. Of the game's cooperative emphasis, Pegg said during an interview with IGN "it's a great exercise in cooperation [...], it's like team building."

In an interview with Casualgaming.biz, EA Bright Light's Gary Napper said of the target audience, "I like to think that we've made a game for everybody. It feels like it's a young person's game, but it's the sort of game I hope a lot of older players, like myself, will play." Napper cited Ratchet & Clank series as one source of inspiration for the game. He also cited the platform genre in general, adding that he "couldn't really call out a specific title" as the main influence for the game. In his interview with IGN, Simon Pegg commented on the visual influences for the game. He cited Japanese manga and cyberpunk elements and added "it's a good representation of contemporary science fiction."

The developers placed emphasis on cooperative gameplay, and provided incentives available only when playing cooperatively. In an interview with Destructoid, Gary Napper stated, "We didn't want to make it just two players running around and doing the same thing, we want to make it so they can do stuff better." Napper further explained the dynamic in his interview with CasualGaming.biz. "There's things in the game that you can do, like if you both double jump at the same time, you perform a high-five which gives you a health pack," stated Napper. Napper said that the developers wanted players to work together, so the incentives provided a way to encourage cooperative play. Other examples of cooperative play incentive included puzzles which required a second player. While none of these puzzles were necessary to solve in order to complete a level, bonus items and other robot characters could be unlocked by completing these sequences. On April 13, 2012, Electronic Arts shut down multiplayer services for the game.

== Reception ==
Reception

Aggregate score
| Aggregator | Score | |
| Aggregator | PS3 | Xbox 360 |
|---|---|---|
| Metacritic | 53/100 | 52/100 |

Review scores
| Publication | Score | |
| Publication | PS3 | Xbox 360 |
|---|---|---|
| Eurogamer | N/A | 4/10 |
| Game Informer | 6/10 | 6/10 |
| GameSpot | 4.5/10 | 4.5/10 |
| IGN | 4.5/10 | 4.5/10 |
| PlayStation Official Magazine – Australia | 5/10 | N/A |
| PlayStation Official Magazine – UK | 6/10 | N/A |
| Official Xbox Magazine (UK) | N/A | 5/10 |
| Official Xbox Magazine (US) | N/A | 4/10 |
| PALGN | N/A | 5.5/10 |
| PlayStation: The Official Magazine | 5/10 | N/A |
| The A.V. Club | N/A | B+ |
| Metro | N/A | 5/10 |

Spare Parts received "mixed" reviews on both platforms according to the review aggregation website Metacritic. In its first two weeks, Spare Parts moved over 15,000 units. That number increased to 34,000 units as of year-end 2011.

Critics were generally favorable of the game's art design and audio. Multiple critics praised the use of comedic actor Simon Pegg. Chris Buffa of RunDLC stated that Pegg's performance "gives Spare Parts much needed personality, thanks to often times humorous dialogue." David Collins, reviewer for GameFocus, also gave high marks for Pegg's performance. Collins felt, however, that it was "unfortunate that the script work didn't use Simon Pegg as well as it could have." He did however give high commentary to the game's visuals. "The cartoony art style and vibrant color palette is sure to appeal to all ages," said Collins. GameSpot's Jeremiah Leif Johnson stated the Spare Parts has "colorful, lively characters and environments" and added "Mar-T and Chip have a few endearing animations, the minions ooze with diabolical cuteness, and the world is unfailingly colorful and upbeat."

Multiple reviewers expressed frustration with the game's camera system. Specifically, they commented on the set camera angles and the fact that the camera could not be rotated. Some reviewers added that the fixed camera angles often caused problems when playing cooperatively. Kristine Steimer and Colin Moriarty of IGN stated players will "end up fighting with your partner for the stubbornly-fixed camera's attention." Dan Whitehead of Eurogamer stated simply that the camera system in cooperative mode was "horrible".

Gameplay mechanics received mixed commentary from reviewers. Buffa praised the fact that the game has several items for the player to find and collect. He also gave high marks for the various upgrades which can be equipped to the characters. Johnson felt that the game lacked direction in regards to its upgrades and their use in the game environment. "[It's] often impossible to figure out which of these tools you need to use next without resorting to help," he noted. Johnson also felt the combat consisted of "repetitive button-mashing". Collins noted that the although the game allows players to defeat all enemies by "[spamming] the basic attack button" that each enemy had a weakness which was more susceptible to a specific combat move.

Brett Day of 411Mania gave the Xbox 360 version a score of 8.5 out of 10 and said, "EA has delivered a great game that will keep you coming back for more, as you will want to find everything on the planet. The biggest downfall is the blasted camera, and it will frustrate the fire out of you at times, and will cause you to die needlessly, but overall the game is excellent. If you are looking for a fun game that is great in both 1 player mode and 2 player modes, then you should definitely give Spare Parts a try." The A.V. Club gave it a B+ and called it "a solid platformer if you're playing solo, but it really shines in multiplayer." However, Roger Hargreaves of Metro gave it a score of five out of ten, saying, "Ratchet & Clank's less talented cousins show just how unimportant technical competence is when a game has no heart or ambition."
