= EA Bright Light =

UK-based video game developer

- Formerly: EA UK (1995-2008)
- Type: Subsidiary
- Industry: Video games
- Predecessor: Bullfrog Productions
- Founded: 1995; 31 years ago
- Defunct: 2011; 15 years ago
- Headquarters: Guildford, England, United Kingdom
- Key people: Harvey Elliott (General Manager)
- Products: The F.A. Premier League Football Manager series (1997–2001); Harry Potter series (2002–2011)
- Number of employees: 100
- Parent: Electronic Arts (1995–2011)

EA Bright Light (formerly known as EA UK) was a British video game developer founded in 1995 by Electronic Arts. The studio was primarily known for its work on licensed franchises such as the video game adaptation of the Harry Potter series. As of 2019, a subsidiary known as EA UK exists, albeit being a publishing operation.

== History ==
EA UK was founded in Chertsey, England, United Kingdom in 1995 by Electronic Arts. In 2001, Bullfrog Productions was merged into EA UK, making it to inherit franchises such as Populous, Dungeon Keeper, Syndicate, and Theme Park.

Originally focusing on developing original IPs, the studio released several well-received titles such as Zubo, the first EA title exclusive to Nintendo DS, in 2008. However, the title was a commercial failure, forcing the company to amend its policy and shift to develop casual games and games that were aiming for younger audience. In later years, they also worked on licensed franchises, such as the video game adaptation of the Harry Potter series, which generally received mixed reviews from critics. The company also worked on few Hasbro-related board game adaptations, such as Hasbro Family Game Night, which was released in 2008.

EA UK was renamed to EA Bright Light in 2008, with its headquarter moved to Guildford, England, United Kingdom. In 2011, after both the movie and the video game franchise of Harry Potter were ended, Electronic Arts began a consultation process to shut down EA Bright Light so as to "help centralise development on future projects, reduce development costs and will allow for better knowledge and talent sharing within the organization". After their last title, Harry Potter and the Deathly Hallows – Part 2 was released, Electronic Arts silently shut down EA Bright Light by the end of 2011. Most employees from Bright Light joined Criterion Games and Playfish, the remaining 2 subsidiaries of Electronic Arts in UK, while others joined Jagex and Supermassive Games.

Despite EA declaring that Bright Light would revive several IPs from Bullfrog, none of the titles were developed before the company's closure. Before the company's closure, it is known that they were developing a Maxis-related title.

== Games developed ==
Year	Title	Platform(s)
as EA UK
1997	FIFA Soccer Manager	Microsoft Windows
1998	The F.A. Premier League Football Manager 99	Microsoft Windows
1999	The F.A. Premier League Stars	Microsoft Windows, PlayStation
1999	The F.A. Premier League Football Manager 2000	Microsoft Windows
2000	The F.A. Premier League Football Manager 2001	Microsoft Windows, PlayStation
2000	The F.A. Premier League Stars 2001	Microsoft Windows, PlayStation
2001	The F.A. Premier League Football Manager 2002	Microsoft Windows
2001	F1 2001	PlayStation 2, Xbox
2002	Shox	PlayStation 2
2002	FIFA Football 2003	PlayStation
2002	Harry Potter and the Chamber of Secrets	PlayStation 2
2003	Harry Potter: Quidditch World Cup	GameCube, Microsoft Windows, PlayStation 2, Xbox
2004	Harry Potter and the Prisoner of Azkaban	GameCube, PlayStation 2, Xbox
2004	Catwoman	GameCube, Microsoft Windows, PlayStation 2, Xbox
2005	Harry Potter and the Goblet of Fire	GameCube, Microsoft Windows, PlayStation 2, Xbox, PlayStation Portable
2007	Burnout Dominator	PlayStation Portable, PlayStation 2
2007	Harry Potter and the Order of the Phoenix	Microsoft Windows, PlayStation 3, Wii, Xbox 360, PlayStation 2, macOS
2007	The Orange Box	PlayStation 3
as EA Bright Light
2008	Zubo	Nintendo DS
2008	Monopoly	PlayStation 2, PlayStation 3, Wii, Xbox 360
2008	Hasbro Family Game Night	PlayStation 2, Wii, PlayStation 3, Xbox 360, Nintendo DS
2009	Trivial Pursuit	PlayStation 2, PlayStation 3, Wii, Xbox 360
2009	Harry Potter and the Half-Blood Prince	Microsoft Windows, PlayStation 2, PlayStation 3, Wii, Xbox 360, macOS
2009	Need for Speed: Shift	PlayStation Portable
2009	Hasbro Family Game Night 2	Wii, Xbox 360
2009	Foto Face: The Face Stealer Strikes	DSiWare
2010	Flips	Nintendo DS
2010	Hasbro Family Game Night 3	PlayStation 3, Wii, Xbox 360
2010	Create	PlayStation 3, Microsoft Windows, Xbox 360, Wii, Mac
2010	Harry Potter and the Deathly Hallows – Part 1	Microsoft Windows, PlayStation 3, Xbox 360, Wii
2011	Spare Parts	PlayStation 3, Xbox 360
2011	Harry Potter and the Deathly Hallows – Part 2	Microsoft Windows, PlayStation 3, Xbox 360, Wii
