= Create (video game) =

2010 video game

- Create PC box art.
- Developer(s): EA Bright Light
- Publisher(s): Electronic Arts
- Platform(s): Microsoft Windows, PlayStation 3, Wii, Xbox 360, OS X
- Release: NA: November 16, 2010; EU: November 19, 2010
- Genre(s): Sandbox

Create is a chain reaction sandbox video game developed by EA Bright Light and published by Electronic Arts for Windows, PlayStation 3, Wii, Xbox 360 and Mac OS X . It was released on November 16, 2010 in North America and November 19, 2010 in Europe. The game supports the PlayStation Move motion controller in addition to standard controllers and Keyboard, mouse inputs. The game is mainly based on creating scenes where players can cause objects to automatically interact with each other in a domino-like effect. The object of the game is to get an object from one place to another, by causing other things to respond in its presence.

== Gameplay ==
The game consists of an interactive main hub which spans into ten themed stages, (such as Theme Park and Transportopia) and a bonus blank stage, where the player creates their own world from scratch. In each stage there are ten challenges to complete. Each challenge falls into a category depending on its objective. Each category consists of using certain objects to reach a goal/target (object challenge), by using several items at once to get the target object to the finish and get a high score (Scoretacular), or even building their own machine out of blocks, girders, wheels and hinges (Contraption-o-Matic). Upon completing a challenge, the player will unlock 'Creative Sparks'. Each Spark will reward the player with an item to use in challenges or to their own devices, props to place in their scenery etc.

To access items, the player must use the main interface which comprises Game Objects (These are used in challenges or can be played with), Brush Tools (These are used to colour each scene), Environment (The player may decorate the sky, add music and weather effects etc.), World Tools (Used to decorate the scenery with props) and options to Reset Creation and Save Creation.

The game also allows plenty of free will for the player, as they may have a break from challenges and play with the items which they have unlocked.

Players can also create custom challenges using the items they have unlocked, which they could upload online for other players to play. They could also upload their own solutions to the premade challenges. However, EA discontinued the online components on April 13, 2012.

== Reception ==
Reception

Aggregate score
Aggregator	Score			
Aggregator	PC	PS3	Wii	Xbox 360
Metacritic	54/100	61/100	62/100	60/100

Review scores
Publication	Score			
Publication	PC	PS3	Wii	Xbox 360
GameSpot	N/A	N/A	5.5/10	6/10
IGN	6/10	6/10	6/10	5.5/10

The game received mostly mixed reviews. With Metacritic counting 62/100 for the Wii, 61/100 for PlayStation 3, 60/100 for Xbox 360, and 54/100 for PC. IGN gave the PC 6.0/10, and said "Create tries to stretch the family game in new directions, but the individual portions of the game feel like lesser versions of a lot of other titles on the market." same score for PlayStation 3 but said "Create feels like a hodge-podge of small ideas that don't add up to a satisfying whole." Where the Xbox 360 got a 5.5/10, it said also like PlayStation 3 "Create feels like a hodge-podge of small ideas that don't add up to a satisfying whole." On the other side, the Wii was given a 5.4/10, and said "Sadly, Create gets boring very soon, and isn't creative at all. There are only a few challenges which are fun – the rest of them are tedious." Vandal gave it a 6/10, and said "Create is oriented to those who like puzzle-solving, but it is not remarkable within that genre. The control get tedious at times, and its map editor is not good enough." Game Informer gave it 50/100, and said "If pushed and polished, Create could have been a rewarding experience. Instead, it feels like EA Bright Light needed some inspiration of its own."
