= Zubo =

2008 video game

- Developer: EA Bright Light
- Publisher: Electronic Arts
- Director: Tony Dudson
- Producer: Michael Heywood
- Designer: Dominic Oldrey
- Programmer: Nick Tuckett
- Composers: Christian Henson; Joe Henson; Alexis Smith
- Platform: Nintendo DS
- Release: EU: October 3, 2008; AU: October 21, 2008; JP: January 22, 2009; NA: March 10, 2009
- Genres: Rhythm, action
- Mode: Single-player

Zubo (Japanese: Toobo (トゥーボ, Tūbo)) is a rhythm action video game developed by EA Bright Light for the Nintendo DS. The game was released in October 2008 in Europe and Australia, January 2009 in Japan and March 2009 in North America.

== Gameplay ==
The player in the midst of battle.

All actions, including movement, selection, and battles, are performed with the stylus and touch screen. In Zubo, players can befriend up to 55 different types of Zubos they meet while travelling in Zubalon, feed and nurture them, help them gain skills and strength, and assist them in chasing off Zombos. Each Zubo is one of 3 types which allows a fully flexible team that you can use to your own advantage in strategic battles with rhythm action mechanics, where the player attacks by tapping or sliding the stylus on the Nintendo DS's touchscreen; different Zubo types are stronger or weaker at attacking others. The game is divided into several themed worlds, each with a team of Zubos which the player can add to their team.

== Plot ==
Zubo is set in the world of Zubalon, which is inhabited by a race called the Zubos. Zubalon is under siege by Big Head and his army of fake Zubo clones, named Zombos.

The objective of the game is to go on a journey around Zubalon with a team of any 3 Zubos you meet along your way, to scavenger through 3 different worlds, defeat all bosses, and then defeat the final boss, Big Head at the end of the game to save and restore the world of Zubalon.

== Reception ==
Reception

Aggregate scores
Aggregator	Score
GameRankings	73.87% (15 reviews)
Metacritic	75/100 (18 reviews)

Review scores
Publication	Score
GameSpot	7.5/10
IGN	7.5/10
Nintendo Power	6.5/10

Zubo received mixed reviews. Critics complimented its charming presentation and new combat system, recommending it for children, while criticizing its lack of storyline and lack of objectives.
