= FIFA Manager =

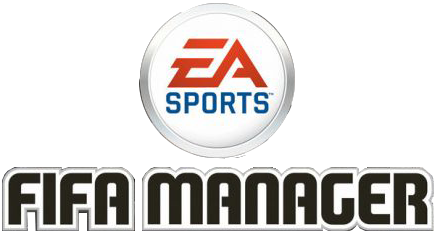
- Genres: Sports management (association football)
- Publisher: EA Sports
- Platform: Microsoft Windows
- First release: FIFA Soccer Manager; 1997
- Latest release: FIFA Manager 14; 25 October 2013

FIFA Manager is an association football series of sports management games published by Electronic Arts. The games were developed by the German studio Bright Future and EA Sports. The game was called Total Club Manager until the name changed to FIFA Manager with the FIFA Manager 06.

Before FIFA Manager and Total Club Manager, EA Sports released FIFA Soccer Manager (1997) and The FA Premier League Football Manager 99, 2000, 2001 and 2002, but while the first managed to attract some attention, the latter were released when the managing games market for non-Championship Manager titles was close to non-existent, and after two unsuccessful titles, it was dropped.

However, by 2001, several employees of German developer Ascaron moved to EA, and the first game, Fussball Manager 2002, was released in Germany only, as a test for a potential series. The game had positive reception, and a year later Total Club Manager 2003 was released, with Bobby Robson on the cover (for the second time, after FIFA Soccer Manager).

One of the key features of Anstoss 3 was the ability to actually play the games after Anstoss Action was released. Although it could be played as a stand-alone game, it only reached the full potential when used with the manager game. This feature, only present on other games with limited geographical distribution, the Spanish PC Fútbol, was included for buyers of both TCM 2004 and FIFA 2004, which could use the Football Fusion function. Some fans managed to control games in TCM 2003 by hacking the configuration files, but data loss and corruption was frequent. Celtic manager Martin O'Neill appeared on the cover of TCM 2004. Criticized by a confusing interface, EA reworked it for TCM 2005, with a more sleek design. European Champion with former FC Porto and Chelsea manager José Mourinho was selected for the main cover.

While the TCM series has been released for Windows, Xbox and PlayStation 2, the FIFAM series is only available for Windows. The PlayStation 2 and Xbox versions of the game were developed for EA Canada by Budcat Creations.

== Games ==
=== FIFA Soccer Manager ===
FIFA Soccer Manager
- Developer: EA UK
- Publisher: EA Sports
- Platform: Microsoft Windows
- Release: EU: 1997

FIFA Soccer Manager (or simply FSM) is a 1997 football managing computer game developed and published by Electronic Arts by their EA Sports label. It was followed by The FA Premier League Football Manager and the Total Club Manager series. An update for the game is freely available from Electronic Arts' FTP. One of the first games in the genre developed for Microsoft Windows, FSM included five playable leagues (England, Scotland, Italy, Germany and France) and all UEFA competitions, including around 7500 players.

FSM was also known for a complete stadium builder, where combining 300 different pieces (stands and roofs) allowed the creation of stadiums with over 300,000 seats (a figure which is still double the highest stadium capacity in the world). While the overall presentation (which included short FMV clips for some events, such as cup/league wins and being sacked) was praised, the interface relied too much on submenus that could not only be reached outside the main section, slowing down gameplay. Also, when the better players retired, they were replaced only by average younger players (rated between 75 and 80), which harmed the possibilities of games over 15 years long, combined with the impossibility of joining a different club.

=== The F.A. Premier League Football Manager 99 ===
The F.A. Premier League Football Manager 99
- Developer: EA UK
- Publisher: EA Sports
- Platform: Microsoft Windows
- Release: EU: 1998

The F.A. Premier League Football Manager 99 is a football sports management game. It is the first game to be released in the F.A. Premier League Football Manager series.

=== The F.A. Premier League Football Manager 2000 ===
The F.A. Premier League Football Manager 2000
- Developers: EA UK (PC); Krisalis Software (PS)
- Publisher: EA Sports
- Platforms: Microsoft Windows, PlayStation
- Release: Microsoft Windows: EU: 29 October 1999; PlayStation: EU: 25 August 2000

The F.A. Premier League Football Manager 2000 is a football sports management game. It is the first sequel to The F.A. Premier League Football Manager 99.

=== The F.A. Premier League Football Manager 2001 ===
The F.A. Premier League Football Manager 2001
- Developer: EA UK
- Publisher: EA Sports
- Platforms: Microsoft Windows, PlayStation
- Release: EU: 8 September 2000

The F.A. Premier League Football Manager 2001 is a football sports management game. It is the second sequel to The F.A. Premier League Football Manager 99.

=== The F.A. Premier League Football Manager 2002 ===
The F.A. Premier League Football Manager 2002
- Developer: EA UK
- Publisher: EA Sports
- Platform: Microsoft Windows
- Release: EU: 14 September 2001

The F.A. Premier League Football Manager 2002 is a football sports management game. It is the third sequel to The F.A. Premier League Football Manager 99.

=== Total Club Manager 2003 ===
Total Club Manager 2003
- Developer: Electronic Arts
- Publisher: EA Sports
- Platform: Microsoft Windows
- Release: EU: 20 September 2002

Total Club Manager 2003 is a football-oriented computer game in the FIFA Manager series, the first game to be released in the Total Club Manager series. It was developed by Electronic Arts.

The cover art features Bobby Robson, with Lothar Matthäus in the German version cover.

=== Total Club Manager 2004 ===
Total Club Manager 2004
- Developers: Electronic Arts; Budcat Creations (Xbox & PS2)
- Publisher: EA Sports
- Platforms: Microsoft Windows, Xbox, PlayStation 2
- Release: Microsoft Windows: EU: 28 November 2003; Xbox: EU: 5 December 2003; PlayStation 2: EU: 12 December 2003

Total Club Manager 2004 is a football-oriented computer game in the FIFA Manager series, the first sequel to Total Club Manager 2003. It was developed by Electronic Arts.

The cover art features Martin O'Neill.

=== Total Club Manager 2005 ===
Total Club Manager 2005
- Developers: EA Canada; Budcat Creations (PS2 & Xbox)
- Publisher: EA Sports
- Platforms: Microsoft Windows, PlayStation 2, Xbox
- Release: Microsoft Windows: EU: 22 October 2004; PlayStation 2 & Xbox: EU: 29 October 2004

Total Club Manager 2005 is the second sequel to Total Club Manager 2003. It was developed by EA Canada.

This game also seen the new feature, Create a Club. This gave the game players the opportunity to create a New Club and try to make them successful.

The cover art features José Mourinho in the English version, and Felix Magath in the German version.

It was the last game in the series to have console releases; all subsequent entries under the FIFA Manager name were PC-exclusive.

=== FIFA Manager 06 ===
FIFA Manager 06
- Developer: EA Canada
- Publisher: EA Sports
- Platform: Microsoft Windows
- Release: EU: 7 October 2005

FIFA Manager 06 is a game produced by EA under the brand EA Sports. It is a football (soccer) management game from the annual series of FIFA Manager titles. FIFA Manager 06 is the only game in the FIFA Manager series to have music from real bands.

1. Diva International – "Nothing to Do"
2. Exitpilot – "Circles Cycles and Braincells"
3. Hard-Fi – "Cash Machine"
4. McQueen – "Running Out of Things to Say"
5. Midnight Juggernauts – "Fire Below"
6. Stereophonics – "Dakota"
7. The Rakes – "Retreat"
8. Vatican DC – "Antisocial"
9. WhiteSilver – "In Brief"

=== FIFA Manager 07 ===
FIFA Manager 07
- Developer: Bright Future
- Publisher: EA Sports
- Platform: Microsoft Windows
- Release: EU: 3 November 2006

FIFA Manager 07 is the 2007 successor to the now annual FIFA Manager series from EA's sports brand, EA Sports. It is the follow-up to FIFA Manager 06.

==== FIFA Manager 07 Extra Time Expansion ====
The Extra Time expansion adds new features like a revised half time talk screen, new 3D stadiums, selling stand names, and more analysis for matches.

=== FIFA Manager 08 ===
FIFA Manager 08
- Developer: Bright Future
- Publisher: EA Sports
- Platform: Microsoft Windows
- Release: EU: 2 November 2007

FIFA Manager 08 is the 2008 successor to the now annual FIFA Manager series from EA's sports brand, EA Sports. It is the follow-up to FIFA Manager 07. FIFA Manager 08 has been created by Bright Future and published by EA Sports. Fußball Manager 08 – Simulationen und Casino Spiele | FM08.de FIFA 08's official site currently offers a Windows demo.

=== FIFA Manager 09 ===
FIFA Manager 09
- Developer: Bright Future
- Publisher: EA Sports
- Platform: Microsoft Windows
- Release: EU: 31 October 2008; AU: 6 November 2008; NA: 19 December 2008

FIFA Manager 09 is the 2009 successor to the FIFA Manager series from EA's sports brand, EA Sports. It is a follow up on FIFA Manager 08. FIFA Manager 09 was developed by Bright Future and published by EA Sports. On 29 October 2008, the first database update was released, including the first division of Cyprus and the necessary adjustments. The game gives players the chance to control a wide range of features from discussing tactics with individual players to creating monster stadiums to house fans.

FIFA Manager 09 received mixed reviews from Metacritic, with an average of 69%. Scores ranged from a dire 30% (Total PC Gaming) up to a more than respectable 85% (GameStar). Most reviews commented on the level of depth and realism involved in the game, while noting that it might well be too much for some. Play.tm called it "more a lifestyle than a game", observing that "a season, if played thoroughly, will take as long as most full games these days". IT Reviews commented that, "it may still feel like you're awash with a tsunami of statistics but FIFA manager 09 has injected a number of new features to appeal to micromanagement fans".

The German version features Joachim Löw on the cover.

=== FIFA Manager 10 ===
FIFA Manager 10
- Developer: Bright Future
- Publisher: EA Sports
- Platform: Microsoft Windows
- Release: WW: 30 October 2009; AU: 5 November 2009

FIFA Manager 10 is the 2010 successor to the FIFA Manager series from EA's sports brand, EA Sports, following up FIFA Manager 09. FIFA Manager 10 was developed by Bright Future and published by EA Spore. When installed there will be two executable files: Single-player mode and the Multiplayer mode that can be played online. The game allows control of a wide range of features from discussing tactics with individual players to creating monster stadiums to house fans. For the first time ever on the series, there is an online mode, as well as 3D animation and a customizable manager desktop.

Bright Future have released a new update on June 2, specially for their 10th anniversary, the new update lets the players manage their national team through the FIFA World Cup 2010. The players can choose the national teams that they want in the tournament and they can choose the original squad or make up their own squad.

=== FIFA Manager 11 ===
FIFA Manager 11
- Developer: Bright Future
- Publisher: EA Sports
- Platform: Microsoft Windows
- Release: EU: 29 October 2010; NA: 3 November 2010

FIFA Manager 11 is the 2011 successor to the FIFA Manager series from EA's sports brand, EA Sports, following up FIFA Manager 10, and is also the 10th edition of the franchise. FIFA Manager 11 was developed by Bright Future and published by EA Sports.

The game features a vast array of all-new features. Hundreds of improvements to the game have been made across the board with a special focus on its core areas. Introduced in 2009 it also includes a separate online mode where up to 8 players can play against each other over the internet.

The manager still has full control over the management of a football club. In the game the manager is responsible for the line-up, the tactics and the training of a team – as well as for signing the right players, improving the club facilities and the stadium. Special highlights are the FIFA 3D engine, more than 13,000 original player pictures, the player manager mode, the national team manager mode, the Create-a-Club mode and the Match Prognosis Tool.

=== FIFA Manager 12 ===
FIFA Manager 12
- Developer: Bright Future
- Publisher: EA Sports
- Platform: Microsoft Windows
- Release: EU: 21 October 2011

FIFA Manager 12 is a football manager simulation video game developed by Bright Future GmbH and published by Electronic Arts worldwide under the EA Sports label. It was released for Microsoft Windows. It is the eleventh game in FIFA Manager series of video games.

=== FIFA Manager 13 ===
FIFA Manager 13
- Developer: Bright Future
- Publisher: EA Sports
- Platform: Microsoft Windows
- Release: EU: 26 October 2012

FIFA Manager 13 is a football management video game developed by Bright Future and published by Electronic Arts. The game was released on Microsoft Windows. In the company's press release on 29 May 2012, Electronic Arts indicated that it would publish FIFA Manager 13 under its EA Sports label, and that Bright Future would develop the game, having previously developed earlier titles in the FIFA Manager series.

A demo for the game was released on the 23 October 2012, three days before the release of the actual game. In the demo allows play in one of six leagues, choice of over 100 teams and play through the first half of the current football season.

The new basic screen resolution of FIFA Manager 13 was increased from 1024x768 to 1280x1024 and the positional level was removed from the game. The general quality of a player will now be calculated with a formula that includes the skill levels and the player type.

=== FIFA Manager 14 ===
FIFA Manager 14
- Developer: Bright Future
- Publisher: EA Sports
- Platform: Microsoft Windows
- Release: EU: 25 October 2013

FIFA Manager 14 is a football management video game developed by Bright Future GmbH, published by Electronic Arts worldwide under the EA Sports label and released on Windows XP, Windows Vista, Windows 7 and Windows 8 in October 2013. The game was mentioned in an EA press release on 8 May by EA Labels president Frank Gibeau and later fully confirmed on the German EA Facebook page on 19 July. A statement regarding the game was finally released on 31 July. The game was released on 24 October 2013 in Germany and a day later in the UK. It is the last installment of the FIFA Manager series as it was announced no further editions after FIFA Manager 14 would be released.

The game was released as a Legacy Edition along with FIFA 14 for PS2, PSP, PS Vita, Wii and Nintendo 3DS. This means no updates to gameplay or game modes at all and no new game modes and features apart from updated kits, rosters and statistics. The only changes to FIFA Manager 14 are the fact that over 25 previously locked features are now available to play right from the start such as Psychological Profile, Coach Rumors, Team Matrix and Expanded Statistics. The international and national name pools have also undergone a complete overhaul, with over 6,000 names added.

The game consists of over 1000 officially licensed clubs, featuring more than 35,000 players, across more than 70 licensed leagues. FIFA Manager 14 retains all of the licenses from FIFA Manager 13, but with the addition of Brazil's Campeonato Brasileiro Série A, Chile's Campeonato Nacional Petrobras, Colombia's Liga Postobón, Argentine Primera División and the Polish Ekstraklasa. There is also the addition of licensed squads for all of the teams in the Ukrainian Premier League, Croatian Prva HNL and the Czech Gambrinus Liga.

== See also ==
- Football Manager
