= Family game =

Family Game or The Family Game may refer to:

- The Family Game, a 1983 Japanese film
- The Family Game (2013), a Japanese TV drama series adapted from the 1983 film
- The Family Game (game show), an American TV game show
- Family Game (console), an Argentine clone of the Nintendo Entertainment System console
- Family Game (2007 film), a 2007 Italian film
- Family Game (2022 film), a 2022 Canadian film
- Family board game, a category of board games

== See also ==
- Family Game Night (disambiguation)
