= Game Night (web series) =

Web series

Game Night is an online sitcom web series revolving around four dysfunctional friends and their quirky lives as told over their weekly video game night. It premiered on 25 October 2010 on YouTube and on the official Game Night – The Online Sitcom website. The series features an eclectic bunch of characters including East-Indian Americans Ajay (Ashwin Gore) and Leon (Rajan Velu), Australian Benny (Simon Dooley), and the Southern Megan (Sarah Zurell). Game Night is produced by Life I.F.T in Los Angeles.

== History ==
Game Night was created by Australian actors Ashwin Gore, Rajan Velu, and Simon Dooley through their newly established production company Life I.F.T. The series is based on their real-life experiences of living in Los Angeles. Ashwin Gore wrote the series while on a trip to Australia, and within two weeks of his return, the actors quickly gathered a cast and crew to shoot the series. The lack of diverse shows in Australia prompted the move to Los Angeles, where the industry is more open to multi-ethnic casting.

== Episodes ==
=== Season 1 (August 2010 – August 2011) ===
No. overall	No. in season	Title
1	1	"Flat Rates"
2	2	"Oh, Poo!"
3	3	"Bring A Friend"
4	4	"Playing Dress Up"
5	5	"Exuberant Dreams"
6	6	"Things that go Bump in the Night"
7	7	"Crystal Clear"
8	8	"Mail Bonding"
9	9	"Mafia"
10	10	"Mafia Part 2"
11	11	"The Call"

== Characters and cast ==
- Ajay is the anal-retentive facilitator of Game Night. Often mistaken for being homosexual, he quickly falls for the newest member of the Game Night crew, Megan. Ajay is portrayed by Ashwin Gore.
- Leon is one of Ajay's best friends and a fellow East-Indian. However, his dark complexion has deluded him into thinking that people keep mistaking him for an African-American. Leon is portrayed by Rajan Velu.
- Benny is the tall and outlandish Australian friend of Ajay and Leon. His quirky and often ridiculous behaviour gets him in trouble with the boys, but he always seems to find a way out. Benny is portrayed by Simon Dooley.
- Megan is the newest member of the Game Night team. Having just moved to Los Angeles, she is beautiful, but completely clueless. Without even trying, she quickly gets the attention of all the boys and soon has them swooning over her. Megan is portrayed by Sarah Zurell.
