= Operation (game) =

Battery-operated game of physical skill

- Logo used since 2013
- Designers: John Spinello
- Publishers: Hasbro
- Publication: March 27, 1965; 61 years ago
- Players: 1–4 players
- Setup time: 2 minutes
- Playing time: 10–20 minutes
- Chance: Low
- Age range: 6+
- Skills: Dexterity

Operation is a battery-operated game of physical skill that tests players' hand-eye coordination and fine motor skills. The game's prototype was invented in 1964 by University of Illinois industrial-design student John Spinello, who sold his rights to renowned toy designer Marvin Glass for $500 and the promise of a job upon graduation, which was not fulfilled. Initially produced by Milton Bradley in 1965, Operation is currently produced by Hasbro, with an estimated franchise worth $40 million.

The game is a variant of the old-fashioned electrified wire loop game popular at fairs. It consists of an "operating table", lithographed with a comic likeness of a patient (nicknamed "Cavity Sam") with a large red lightbulb for his nose. On the surface are several openings, labeled with the names of fictional and humorous ailments, that contain plastic pieces. The general gameplay requires players to remove these plastic objects with a pair of tweezers without touching the edge of the cavity opening.

== Gameplay ==
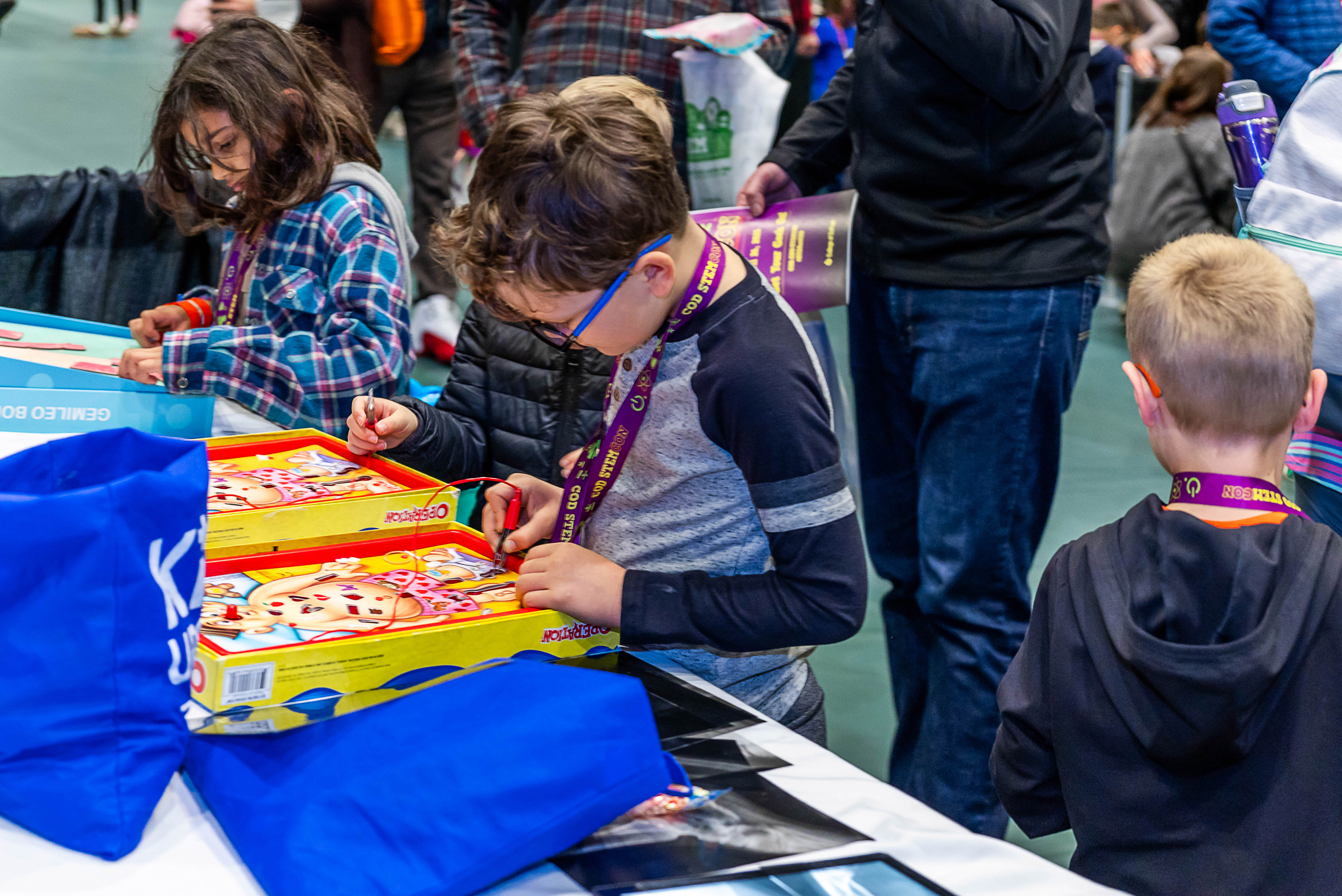
Children playing Operation at an educational event.

Operation includes two sets of cards, "Doctor" and "Specialist." The Specialist cards are dealt evenly to the players at the start of the game, and any extra cards are removed from play. The Doctor cards are shuffled to form a deck and are placed face-down.

In the American and Australian versions, players take turns drawing the top Doctor card from the deck, offering a cash payment for removing a particular object. The player in control uses a pair of tweezers (dubbed "Electro Probe" in earlier versions), connected to the board by a wire, to remove the piece without touching the metal edges of the cavity in which it rests. Successful removal of the piece awards the value shown on the card, while a failure allows the player holding the Specialist card for that ailment (if any) a chance to remove it for double value. If the Specialist card holder also fails, or if no player is holding it, the Doctor card is returned to the bottom of the deck. Cards of both types are removed from play as the pieces corresponding to their listed ailments are removed.

A player drawing a particular Doctor card while holding the corresponding Specialist card may deliberately fail the first attempt in order to have a second chance for double value.

The winner is the player with the most money after all plastic pieces have been extracted.

The game is challenging because of the shapes of the plastic pieces and the narrow openings are barely larger than the pieces that they contain.

== Play pieces ==
- Adam's Apple: An apple in the throat ($300).
- Broken Heart: A heart shape with a crack on the right side of the chest ($100).
- Wrenched Ankle: A wrench in the right ankle ($100).
- Butterflies in Stomach: A large butterfly in the middle of the torso ($500).
- Spare Ribs: Two ribs fused together as one piece ($150).
- Water on the Knee: A pail of water in the knee ($150).
- Funny Bone: A cartoon-styled bone ($400).
- Charlie Horse: A small horse that rests near the hip joint ($400).
- Writer's Cramp: A pencil in the forearm ($300).
- Ankle Bone Connected to the Knee Bone: A rubber band that must be stretched between two pegs at the left ankle and knee. This is the only non-plastic piece in the game and the only challenge in which the player must insert rather than remove something ($200). Its name derives from the spiritual song "Dem Bones".
- Wish Bone: A wishbone similar to that of a chicken located on the left side of the chest ($300).
- Brain Freeze: An ice-cream cone located in the brain ($600). This was added in 2004 when Milton Bradley allowed fans to vote on a new piece during a promotion titled "What's Ailing Sam?" that included a top prize of a $5,000 shopping spree. The other contenders were Tennis Elbow and Growling Stomach.
- Bread Basket: A slice of bread with a small notch removed from the top for easier grip ($1000).

== Other versions ==
The 1964-1965 Saturday morning children's game show Shenanigans had a life sized, three-dimensional Operation game as one of its challenges.

Aside from the traditional board game version, Milton Bradley also produced a hand-held version which had a screen in Sam's tummy.

This also had a PC game produced in 1998.

In 2002, a brain surgery version was released, requiring the player to pull pieces out of a wisecracking Cavity Sam's head, within 15 seconds. Sam's nose lights up after time runs out.

In May 2004, a Shrek version of the game was released.

In 2005, saw the release of a Simpsons version of the game, featuring a talking Homer Simpson being operated on by doctors Julius Hibbert and Nick Riviera. Items in the game include Bowler's Thumb, Foot in Mouth, and Rubber Neck. When a player misses, Homer screams or says one of his trademark lines such as "D'oh! or "This is not good!".

In December 2006, a Spider-Man version was released in which the player operates on the Marvel superhero Spider-Man. In early 2008, Hasbro featured another Marvel superhero when it released an Incredible Hulk edition of the game to promote The Incredible Hulk feature film. In 2010, Hasbro also released an Iron Man version of the game to promote Iron Man 2

In early 2007, a SpongeBob SquarePants version was introduced, featuring game pieces such as a "shoehorn" and a "Krabby Patty pleasure center". Based on the Nickelodeon TV series by the same name.

Later in 2007, Hasbro released a different version of the original game called "OPERATION Rescue Kit" in which the participant plays four different timed games with three skill levels. Each skill level reduces the starting amount of time. Cavity Sam has a heart monitor in this version, and the player can pump oxygen into him to gain more time.

In August 2008, Hasbro released a "Silly Skill Game" version which features 13 different sound effects for each of the different parts. Here the winner of the game is the player who removes most parts successfully.

A Doctor Who version of the game was released in Great Britain, where players get to "operate" on a Dalek in order to (from the product description) "make it strong enough to take over the world. But be careful... if you damage it'll quickly tell you with one of its terrifying phrases! Whether it's the Targeting Sensor that you need to operate on, or the Manipulator Arm, you'll need a steady hand and nerves of steel!"

In 2010, Hasbro released a Toy Story 3 version featuring Buzz Lightyear as the patient. This followed the release of the Toy Story 3 feature film into theaters. Another Pixar film was promoted in 2011, when Hasbro made a Cars 2 edition including Mater the tow truck.

On The Hub's television game show Family Game Night hosted by Todd Newton, a segment called Operation Relay is played, where two families compete one after the other. Family members take turns pulling pieces out of an oversized Operation gameboard, and then running through an obstacle course to eventually place them in a container at the end of the course. If a player fails to pull a piece without touching the side, or drops it while going through the obstacle course, they must move to the back of the line, and it's the next person's turn. Each piece is worth a specific amount of points, and whichever team has earned the highest score when time expires wins. Also on the show is Operation Sam Dunk, in which families play skee ball to collect the most points possible. Each family gets two turns and the team with the highest score wins the game. For the show's third season, Operation is introduced, in which one family can win money for a shopping spree by removing pieces to earn up to four rolls and then play skee ball in a same manner as in Operation Sam Dunk.

In 2013, Hasbro introduced Doc McStuffins and Despicable Me 2 versions of the game.

In 2016, Hasbro introduced Finding Dory and Trolls versions of the game.

In 2022, Hasbro introduced a Minions: The Rise of Gru version of the game.

== Reviews ==
- Games and Puzzles
