= Family Game Night (game show) =

American game show

- Genre: Game show
- Based on: Hasbro Family Game Night by Electronic Arts and Hasbro Board Games
- Directed by: Rich DiPirro
- Presented by: Todd Newton
- Announcer: Burton Richardson; Andrew Kishino; Stacey J. Aswad
- Composer: Vanacore Music
- Country of origin: United States
- Original language: English
- No. of seasons: 5
- No. of episodes: 101

Production
- Executive producers: Barry Poznick; John Stevens; Charles Steenveld (S1-S2); Bob Boden (S1-S2); Kevin Belickoff; Stephen Davis
- Production locations: Sunset Bronson Studios; Hollywood, California (2010–12; 2013–14); Delfino Studios; Sylmar, California (2012)
- Running time: 44 minutes
- Production companies: ZOO Productions; All3Media America (season 5); Hasbro Studios

Original release
- Network: The Hub / Hub Network (2010–2014); Discovery Family (2014)
- Release: October 10, 2010 – November 9, 2014

Family Game Night (abbreviated as FGN) is an American television game show based on Hasbro's family of board games and EA's video game franchise of the same name. The show was hosted by Todd Newton. Burton Richardson was the announcer for the first two seasons; he was replaced by Stacey J. Aswad in the third season, and Andrew Kishino was hired for the fourth season. The 60-minute program debuted on October 10, 2010, on The Hub (formerly Discovery Kids, the network became Discovery Family on October 13, 2014); it was previewed on October 9, 2010, on its sister channel, TLC. Seasons 1 and 2 contained 26 and 30 episodes respectively. Seasons 3, 4 and 5 each contained 15 episodes. Season 2 premiered on Friday, September 2, 2011, with additional games being added. The games added to the second season included Cranium Brain Breaks (which replaced Guess Who? as the opening toss-up game), Green Scream, Ratuki Go-Round, Simon Flash, Operation Sam Dunk, Trouble Pop Quiz, and Spelling Bee. However games from the previous season were still kept.

On June 19, 2012, Family Game Night was renewed for a third season by The Hub, which premiered on September 23, 2012.

On July 9, 2012, it was announced that Family Game Night was one of four original series from The Hub that won the CINE Golden Eagle Award for high-quality production and storytelling.

The show's fifth season premiered on August 3, 2014, and added a new feature in which a celebrity plays to win cash and prizes for the audience members that they team up with, as well as their favorite charities. The fifth season ended on November 9, 2014.

The show's host Todd Newton won a Daytime Emmy Award for Outstanding Game Show Host in 2012 for his work on the show, He was also nominated four times in that category.

== Gameplay ==
For the first two seasons, the TV show featured two families of four (one wearing red, the other wearing yellow) competing for cash and prizes. Each family consisted of the mother, the father, and two children, ages 8 to 18. Teams are usually named for the younger of the two kids (i.e. Willie's Family or Suzie's Family).

Teams earned "Monopoly Crazy Cash Cards" by playing five games that varied in each episode. Whenever a family won a game, the youngest child was allowed to select a Monopoly Crazy Cash Card from a rack located at the "Crazy Cash Corner" on the far left of the stage. The rack initially held 21 different cards, each depicting one of the tokens used in either the original "Monopoly" board game or the "Monopoly: Here and Now Edition" board game. Each card held a different randomized amount of money, which was revealed at the end of the show. Most of the cards were valued between $200–$995 in $5 increments, although at least one card held a four-figure amount (usually between $1,000–$7,000) and one card was the "Top Cash Card" worth between $7,500–$25,000.

In addition to the Cash Card, a family that won a game also received a special bonus prize which they kept regardless of the final outcome of the show. In the first season of the show, this prize was simply revealed by host Newton, but in the second season, each prize was a "Monopoly Party Prize" revealed by announcer Burton Richardson and still shown as a prize, but with a "(Subject of Prize) Party" before it being revealed and explained. At the end of the show, both families took their accumulated cards to the "Crazy Cash Machine". Each card was placed into the Machine, revealing its value, at which point the machine would spit out the amount in oversized Monopoly Money bills. Both families kept all the cash and prizes they won during the game, and the family with the most cash at the end also won a vacation. If there was a tie after both families had used all their cards, then both families won the vacation, rather than playing a tiebreaker. However, this never occurred in any episode. If the "Top Cash Card" was not found by the players, the host would tell the audience near the end of the show what card held it. The only time it was not told was in the second produced episode.

In season 3, the format of the show was changed. Instead of two families competing for the whole show, families of varying sizes (two to five members) were chosen from the studio audience to play the games, winning cash or prizes. Instead of earning Monopoly Cash Cards, teams competed for a prize and/or money (depending on the game). They each then took combination codes from the Mr. Monopoly statue's hand. After four games (five in seasons 4 and 5), the families attempted to use these cards to open the Community Chest. If they picked the winning combination, they won money and the chance to play for more money and a grand prize of a brand-new car.

The final game was the "Crazy Cash Machine" where the child chose from a board of 16 Monopoly Cash Cards, starting from the bottom row. Each row above it had one more "Go to Jail" card than the previous one (meaning there were none on the bottom row, one in the second row, two in the third row and three on the top row). The one winning card on the top row had the word "WIN" instead of a cash amount. If a "Go to Jail" card was selected, the game was over; however, the family kept the money they earned up to that point. If they made it to the top row and selected the WIN card, they won a new car in addition to the money accumulated.

== Games ==
=== Season 1 ===
Family Game Night featured an interchangeable selection of Games, similar to The Price Is Right. Many games involved family members playing in turn, starting in order with the youngest child, then the oldest child, the moms, and finally, the dads. In total, 10 games were used in the first season.

==== Guess Who? ====
Guess Who? is an opening toss-up game that decides which family is given the option to play first or second in the first game. The host gives up to four clues to the identity of a celebrity or a fictional person. The families can buzz in whenever they want. If they get it right, they get to pick to go first or second in the next game. If they get it wrong, the other family wins the round and they get to decide if they want to go first or second. In addition, after this game, each family selects a "Crazy Cash" card, starting with the family that will be playing first.

==== Scrabble Flash ====
Scrabble Flash is a game where the families have to make words using 5 oversized electronic Scrabble Flash letter tiles. Alternating between teams, each family member in family order takes a turn picking what word they can make. The player then arranges the Flash tiles used to make that word. The team gets 3 points for making a word with 3 letters, 4 points for making a word with 4 letters, or 5 points for making a word with 5 letters. The first family to reach a score of 25 points or more is the winner.

==== Cranium ====
Cranium is actually a set of four minigames, each represented by one of the Cranium characters. The host reveals one of the characters and the character's related game. The game is then played in two parts, with the children in each team competing first, followed by the parents. The team with the most points at the end of the game wins.

In an early episode, all 4 minigames were featured; the team with the highest combined score won the game.

Data Head: Players are shown a series of images and are either asked questions about the image or are asked to identify an aspect of the image or something related to it. Five such images/questions are asked to the kids for 10 points each. Then another five more difficult images/questions are asked of the parents for 20 points each.

Creative Cat: This minigame is divided into 2 halves. In the first half, the 2 children in each family are given clay, as well as a card with a thing that each pair of children has to make from their clay. After a commercial break, the clay "masterpieces" are brought out, and the parents have 15 seconds to guess what their children made. Each correct answer is worth 10 points per second remaining. Then, in the second half, the parents get to draw things for their children to guess. Each parent uses an electronic sketch pad and is blindfolded while drawing. The children then have 15 seconds to guess what each parent is drawing. Correct answers are worth 10 points per second remaining. The family with the most total points from the two halves wins the round.

Star Performer: In one version of this minigame, Dads have 30 seconds to guess activities performed by their kids and their wife; The first round had players form letters and are worth 10 points, the second round sees players forming numbers which are worth 20, the third round is symbols which are worth 30, and finally the characters form general things with each correct answer worth 40 points. The family with the most points wins the round. If there's a tie, then the Dad that guesses correctly in the least amount of time wins.

In another version of this minigame, the families faced a music keypad with five notes numbered and colored. 1-Blue, 2-Red, 3-Green, 4-Yellow and 5-Purple. This is a Simon-like game where the player who made a mistake forfeited the points to his/her opposing family. The kids played first and they must add one note at a time; their round is worth 10 points. The adults played second, but they must add two notes at a time; their round is worth 20 points. The family with the most points wins. This version is now played in the second season as Cranium Piano.

Word Worm: In one version of this minigame, the kids are shown words that are revealed either from top to bottom or reverse. The first team to guess a word scores 10 points; five words are played. Then, the parents participate in a "backwards spelling bee", in which they have to spell given words backwards, at 20 points per correct word. The family with the most total points wins.

In another version of this minigame, the families have to figure out what fills in the blank between two other words. For example Couch ______ Chip, the word in-between would be potato (similar to the "Before & After" puzzles on Wheel of Fortune).

==== Bop It! Boptagon ====
Bop It! Boptagon is a memory game designated to test how fast the players can respond to specific commands. Set inside a ring called the "Boptagon", the players each operate one of 8 stations: Twist It, Pull It, Shout It, Kick It, Whack It, Honk It, Crash It, and Bop It. The players will hear a command, and they must obey it in time (before the next command). They might also hear "Rotate It" and "Reverse It". When they hear one of these commands, they move one station left (clockwise) for Rotate It, and one station right (counter-clockwise) for Reverse It. Commands arrive more frequently over time. If one or more players fail to correctly obey the command, does their command if it is not the one called, activates it during "Rotate It" or "Reverse It", goes in the wrong direction during "Rotate It" or "Reverse It", or goes past their station during "Rotate It" or "Reverse It", they are knocked out. In case every alive player fails on the same command, they may still stay in the game. The family with at least one member left in the Boptagon (when the whole other team is out) is the winner.

==== Guesstures Free Fall ====
In Guesstures Free Fall, a variation of the charades game Guesstures, one parent member of the family has two minutes to guess things or actions mimed by the other three family members, each suspended in mid-air by wires. 10 points are awarded for each correct answer, but if the family member who guesses decides to pass on an item or if the family member who mimes talks or makes an illegal sound while doing so, the miming player is then lowered, freefall-style, behind the Guesstures barrier. The answer is then revealed, and another of the family members suspended in mid-air gets to mime. The family with the most points wins the round. Ties are broken by determining which family had the fewest passes.

A subsequent rules change for this game had the time limit reduced to 45 seconds, with all three family members acting out things or actions for the fourth member to guess. The same scoring rules remained in effect. At the 30-second mark, one of the family members is lowered, followed by another at the 15-second mark. Passing is allowed only 3 times.

A later rule change doubled the time limit to 90 seconds, with each family member being given 30 seconds to act out progressively harder words. In the first 30 seconds, the younger child will act out words for 10 points each. In the middle 30, the older child will act out 20-point words, and in the last 30 seconds, the adult will act out words for 30 points each. Guessers are still only allowed 3 passes.

The 2-minute version of Guesstures Free Fall continued for the second season, with the addition of a short fanfare playing once three members from each family rise in mid-air. Guessers are allowed infinite passes.

==== Operation Relay ====
Operation Relay is where the families take turns in family order to get the pieces from Cavity Sam using tongs. If they hit the edge, the person is buzzed and has to go to the end of the line. If they get the piece, they have to limbo under a giant bone (called the "limbone"), walk across two balance beams, jump over two hurdles, then go through a giant tissue box (in the first episode the game was featured in, the hurdles were not used and the balance beam was longer). If they do something wrong they do not get the points. If they trip over or miss an obstacle, they have to go to the end of the line. Each family is given 2 or 2½ minutes, with the family scoring the most points winning the game. If a tie occurs the family with the fewest buzzes from Sam is the winner.

==== Bounce 'n Boogie Boggle ====
On a 5-by-5 grid that resembles a Boggle board (a "Big Boggle" board), family members take turns searching for words. A player announces a word, then walks or jumps to the first letter in the word, and spells it out by jumping from square to square to spell them, scoring 1 point for each letter in a correct word. Words must be at least 3 letters long, and the letters used in spelling the word must touch each other in the grid vertically, horizontally, or diagonally. If a player spells a word that has two letters, backtracks (uses a letter square they have already used in the given word), spells a word incorrectly, uses unconnected letters, spells a word different from their announced word, steps on the same letter twice, uses contraction words, fails to make a word after beginning to jump, or fails to come up with a word in time, that player's turn is lost. The family that scores the most points in the 2-minute time limit wins. Also, if a family member spells a pre-determined 6-, 7-, or 8- letter Secret Word (which was shown to the home viewers), that family wins a bonus prize. This was changed to the "Boggle Bonus Word" in season 2.

==== Connect 4 Basketball ====
In this variation on the vertical checkers game Connect Four, the checkers are replaced with red and yellow balls. Family members take turns in family order throwing those balls into baskets on a 7x6 board, to get 4 in a row in any direction.

In the fifth aired (first produced) episode, players from both teams shot their red and yellow balls at the same time. The first team to make 4 in a row won one round; the first to win two rounds won the game.

==== Twister Lights Out ====
In this variation on Twister, the floor-level video board in the center of the studio turns into a 10-by-10 Twister board. Family members have to follow commands by placing a certain limb on a certain colored dot on the board. As play goes on, the dots disappear one by one, clockwise. If a family member's hand or foot is on a dot about to disappear, he/she must move their hand/foot to another dot of the same color. Multiple limbs of the same person may occupy the same dot, but any two people may not share a dot. If a family member either [1] has a body part that is on a disappeared dot, [2] does not follow the command in time, [3] has any body part other than hands or feet on the board, [4] has their hand or foot off of the Twister board (after all four limbs have been assigned a color), or [5] executes a command incorrectly, they are eliminated.

The first round has the kids participating; the second round has the adults taking part. Whichever family has one player standing wins a round; two rounds win the game. If a third round is needed, Todd tosses a coin, with heads indicating that the kids play, and tails indicating the adults play; whichever family wins that round then wins the game. However, the third round will have slight modifications to increase the difficulty; in Season 1, the commands are called more frequently, while in Season 2, the outer row of dots is removed and the dots disappear almost immediately.

==== Sorry! Sliders ====
In this big version of Sorry! Sliders, each family has one of rings with point values starting at 5 in the center, then 3, 1 and The Sorry! Ring, which is worth no points (and prompts the audience to shout out "Sorry!"), in the outer area. Players can push their opponent's pawns to affect the scoring. Each round consists of 2 rolls per family. The family with the most points slides the round, and the first family to win 2 rounds wins the game. If a round is tied, each family gets a half-win. If tied after 2 rounds, a "slide-off" takes place with only one roll per family; the most points wins. Starting in season 2, each team places a special prize dot on the board (except that they cannot place their dots on the 5-point zone). If a team's pawn is at least partially on their prize dot at the end of the round, their team wins a prize; if their pawn is on their opponent's dot at the end of the round, that pawn does not count for any points.

==== Yahtzee Bowling ====
In this variation of Yahtzee, the dice are represented as 5 six-sided bowling pins with dice pips numbered 1 through 6 on every pin. Each family gets three chances to roll a bowling ball down a lane and knock down the pins to make the best scoring combination possible—in order from least to best: a pair, two pair, three of a kind, a small square, a full house, a large straight, four of a kind, or Yahtzee (five of a kind).

The family with the best combination wins a frame; two frames win the game. If a "Roll-Off" is required after the families split the first two, each family gets only one roll, picking their best roller from each family, whoever scores the best combination wins the game. A family who makes a Yahtzee also receives a bonus prize (this only happened once, however).

==== Monopoly Crazy Cash Machine ====
Both teams use the Crazy Cash Cards from the Crazy Cash Corner to earn cash. The Crazy Cash Corner holds 21 cards in a 3x7 grid featuring Monopoly tokens. Both teams start with one card and they can earn more by winning games. Each player from a team inserts the card into the machine and a random amount of cash is added to their bank with the highest amount ranging from $7,500 to $25,000. When that happens, Monopoly money will come out of the machine. The team with the most cash when all of the cards are used earns a vacation. Both teams get to keep their money.

=== Season 2 ===
In addition to the return of Bop It Boptagon, Bounce 'n Boogie Boggle, Connect 4 Basketball, Cranium, Guesstures Freefall, Sorry! Sliders, Yahtzee Bowling and Twister Lights Out, new games were introduced. Also, Guess Who? was no longer the opening game, and Operation Relay and Scrabble Flash (now used on Scrabble Showdown) were removed. Also, teams earned "Monopoly Party Packages" for winning each game. In total, 16 games were used.

==== Cranium Brain Break ====
A Cranium Brain Break was the new toss-up for season 2. Teams would perform a short challenge, such as trying to throw two rings onto a Sorry! Slider in the dark, or getting more paper balls in a basket on host Newton's head in 30 seconds. In a timed event, if the game ends in a tie, the first team that scores in the game wins.

==== Cranium Guesstimator ====
One team is given a question that has a numeric answer. The other team must then predict if the actual answer is higher or lower than the first team's guess. The kids play first for questions worth 10, 20, 30 and 40 points, then the adults play more difficult questions for double points. The highest score wins. If there is a tie, one final question is read, and each team makes a numeric guess, with the closest guess winning.

==== Cranium Who's Older ====
Teams take turns being shown a pair of people and/or things and identifying which one is older. Right answers win points, wrong answers forfeit the points to the opposing team. The kids play four questions worth 10 points each, then the adults play four questions at double points. The highest score wins. If there is a tie, one final question is played, and the team that buzzes in first gets to answer, with the winner determined by their right or wrong answer.

==== Simon Flash ====
A variation on Simon, families wear giant cubes around their bodies, colored red, yellow, green, and blue. A sequence appears on screen and families arrange themselves to match the sequence to score a point. Each player's color randomly changes after each score. First to five points wins.

==== Operation Sam Dunk ====
Replacing Operation Relay, this game involves rolling skee-balls to land in various "Funatomy Cavities" on Sam's body to score points. Also, a bell (for Ringing In The Ears) is installed to double the team's total score if hit. (If no one has tried for the bell yet after the first round, Newton will call attention to it.) Each family member gets two rolls in family order. The highest score wins.

List of Funatomy Cavities from least to best scoring:

- Ringing in the Ears: Double Score
- Frog in the Throat: 500 Points
- Bird Brained: 400 Points
- Bad Plumbing: 350 Points
- The Giggles: 300 Points
- Toxic Gas: 250 Points
- Phone Finger: 200 Points
- Burp Bubbles: 150 Points

==== Ratuki Go-Round ====
A variation on Ratuki, this game involves a relay race to get rid of twenty cards, with values from 1 to 4 on it, and the final 20th card with a value of 5 on it (displayed by different types of pictures) by placing them on a center spinner initially holding five cards with values from 1 to 5 on them. Players can only place a card that is either one number higher or lower than the previous card that was placed. If a family member placed a 5 card, the other team froze for 10 seconds. The final card with a value of 5 cannot be placed down until all the other cards are gone. Breaking the rules causes the opponents to automatically win the game. The first family to place all their cards wins.

Midway through the season, the rules were adjusted. If a player placed an incorrect card, the entire team froze for 10 seconds. In addition, regular 5s were removed from the team's decks. The final 5, however, must still be played last to win.

==== Trouble Pop Quiz ====
The kids are asked number-based toss-up questions, using a big Pop-o-Matic to answer. A right answer or a false start from the opponent moves mom or dad (of the kid's choice) forward the number of spaces shown on the die. If a team answers incorrectly, the other team gets to answer. Landing on an opponent's space sends the opponent back a space. The first team to get both parents past their finish line (which is their opponents' starting line) wins. In the first three instances of this game (in production order), the children in each team would alternate answering, whereas later episodes saw all four children playing at the same time.

==== Green Scream ====
Kids roll around in green sacks on a green screen floor, thus revealing pictures (associated with a category) for the parents to guess in 90 seconds. Up to ten are used per family and a right answer scores ten points. The highest score after the game wins. If there is a tie after the 90 second time limit, the team who correctly solved the words in the fastest time wins. The parents may direct their kids to go in certain directions on the floor as they wish. Parents may pass on pictures, but they may not come back once they have done so.

==== Spelling Bee ====
Mom wears a "stinger" (a black marker) on her back to spell out words for other family members. The moms are not allowed to talk, or else the word is disqualified. They are, however, sometimes encouraged to make "buzzing" noises like a bee. If a family can't guess the word after the third letter, host Newton gives a clue to the word. Each right answer is worth 100 points, and each family has 90 seconds to guess as many words as possible. The highest score wins. Ties are broken by who took the least time to score their words.

=== Season 3 ===
Some of the basic games were held over from the previous seasons. However, they were changed in some ways to accommodate the show's new format as well as the addition of other games (with Simon Flash and Connect 4 Basketball as the only games to remain unchanged). Also, Stacey J. Aswad took over the announcing duties, replacing Burton Richardson. However, Newton himself does the announcing duties for the intro instead, while Aswad takes over after. After each game was played, each team picked a combination code for the Community Chest near the end of the show. Each combination had three specified colors, and if the chest was opened, the teams would play for a new car. If the chest was not opened, the teams kept the prizes they won earlier, as with seasons 1 and 2. In total, only 8 games were used.

==== Battleship ====
The players stood behind podiums with a button. On the 5x5 floor grid, six ships (3 cruisers, 2 submarines and a battleship) were hidden under coordinates that the players called out on the board (for example: B3). Once the coordinate was locked in, Newton and the audience did a three-second countdown. After the "Launch!" signal was given, the player pressed the button, which launched a virtual peg from the video screen in the background. Each hit sunk a ship, and three sunken ships won the game. If the family had a score of 3–2 without any misses, the family with 2 ships sunk would have a chance to get a prize as their opponents did, so that both families could win the same prize. The winners got to draw a Community Chest combination code from Mr. Monopoly's hand first and won the game's prize package.

==== Sorry! ====
Instead of Sorry Sliders, the parent now dressed up as a "Sorry!" pawn and was moved down a path with different dollar amounts from $100 to $900 in $100 steps by their child(s) choosing a card with either several spaces to move ranging from one to four, or "Sorry!" on them. The players could stop on any of the spaces and win the cumulative amount of money they landed on, or continue towards the prize at the end. If a "Sorry!" card was drawn, the parent was moved back to start and they lost the money in their bank at that point. If the other "Sorry!" card was drawn, the game was over. At the end of the game, the family drew a combination card for the Community Chest.

==== Operation ====
In this variation, the family can win money. To begin with, the family gets one roll and they can earn up to three more by removing a piece from the parent's body. After that, they will use these rolls to earn money by rolling into Cavity Sam, which is similar to Operation Sam Dunk from the show's second season. The family can win up to $4,000 in cash and they will also earn a Community Chest combination card.

==== Yahtzee Bowling ====
Although fundamentally the same from the previous seasons, instead of two families competing with each other, one family is chosen from the audience and three members must bowl (one for each person), trying to build up a different combination of numbers. However, instead of the highest combination winning the game in earlier seasons, each combination is assigned a different prize the family can win after they have all played ranging from cameras to a vacation. At the end of the game, they proceed to draw a Community Chest combination card.

==== Bop It! Boptagon ====
Though fundamentally the same as the previous seasons, the Boptagon is now smaller and accommodates only one player at a time in teams of two. Each player gets thirty seconds to get as many commands as possible. The new commands include "Chop It!" and "Squeeze It!" (which replace Twist It and Shout It). Pull It is now a rope instead of a leg with a shoe. After two rounds of play with both team members, the team with more correct commands wins the game. Ties are broken in favor of the child who completes their first command faster. After that, the two teams will receive a Community Chest combination card.

==== Twister Lights Out ====
Basically the same as the previous season, there are several changes. First, there is the new command of "air," which means the players must raise the indicated body part off the ground. Second, the dots no longer disappear one at a time but a "warning light" appears to alert the contestants that the outermost dots are disappearing, and they must move their body parts inward.

==== Monopoly Community Chest ====
All teams have a chance to play for a car by using a combination card from the previous games they've played during the show. Each card has three colors. To unlock the chest, the team captain must input the three-color combination code that Newton calls out before pressing the button. If it's locked, a buzzer will sound, signaling a wrong combination. When that happens, that team will go back into the studio audience. If it opens, however, then a fanfare will play, with firework sounds being heard, and Monopoly cash and confetti will come out from the chest, which signals a winning combination. When that happens, that team will move on to the Monopoly Crazy Cash Machine for a chance to win more money and a brand-new car.

==== Monopoly Crazy Cash Machine ====
This is the same as in the previous seasons, but only one family can play with 16 Crazy Cash Cards in a 4x4 grid. Nine of the cards have cash, six of them have Go To Jail, and the last one has Win. Each time they get a Cash Card from each row, they will earn the corresponding amount on the card and move on to the next one. If a team gets a Go To Jail Card (rows two through four), the game is over, but they get to keep all the money they've earned along with the prizes from earlier. When that happens, Newton will reveal wherein the top row of the car is. However, if they get to the top row and successfully find the Win Card (the screen displays "WIN!" and "GO TO JAIL" on slots), they'll earn a Jeep Patriot in Seasons 3 & 4, and a Ford Escape in Season 5, along with the prizes and the money they've accumulated.

=== Season 4 ===
For the show's fourth season, new games were introduced along with returning games, and some classic games were modified. Also, Andrew Kishino took over the announcing duties replacing Stacey J. Aswad. Newton also no longer announces during the intro, leaving Kishino to do all announcing duties similar to Richardson. The names in each selected family are also now shown on the big screen. Those families who lose their games receive $100. Combinations were still chosen from Mr Monopoly's hand to open the Monopoly Community Chest before playing the Monopoly Crazy Cash Machine. In all ten games were used.

==== Monopoly Remix ====
The fast-dealing game of properties is re-imagined in a whole new way; a sharp eye and a good sense of recall are rewarded with cash and prizes. One family plays on a MONOPOLY-style virtual game board with two dark blue property spaces — Boardwalk and Park Place — and starts with $1,000 of MONOPOLY money. In the first round, Boardwalk and Park Place are shuffled amongst two penalty spaces — Luxury Tax and Income Tax, $300 each. Family members use keen vision and extreme concentration to follow the properties as they are rapidly shuffled around the playing field. If the family accurately identifies and places their jumbo-sized hotels where Boardwalk and Park Place landed on the game board, they keep the $1,000 of MONOPOLY money. If the family places their hotels on the penalty spaces, they pay the fine. In the first round, the penalty spaces cost $300 each. In the second round, a Street Repairs space is added and the penalty spaces cost $400 each. In the final round, the fines increase to $500 and a Bankrupt space is added. If a hotel is placed on Bankrupt (and/or they run out of MONOPOLY money), the game is over. If the family has any MONOPOLY money left at the end of the game, they win that amount in real cash and a prize.

==== Jenga ====
Two families stack and remove blocks on an oversized version of the iconic Jenga tower. The game starts with one member from each family picking a numbered disc from a box. The number indicates how many Jenga blocks the other family members have to pull from anywhere on the tower and stack on top within a two-minute time allotment. The tension builds with each turn as the tower gets perilously higher and unbalanced, and the families race against the clock. The teammates must alternate tagging each other removing and placing the blocks, as well as pressing their buzzer to stop their clock. The family who avoids knocking over the tower or running out of time during their turn wins the game. A family can be assessed a five-second penalty if one teammate does something out of turn.

==== Yahtzee ====
The famous dice game was re-invented for the new season. Yahtzee is now played in two rounds by one family. The object of the game is to stop the spinning animated dice to get a Yahtzee, which is five-of-a-kind. Before the family plays, they answer one trivia question that has three correct answers. Each correct answer earns them one WILD space on all five dice; the WILD space can represent any number on the dice and helps the family get closer to the ultimate five-of-a-kind Yahtzee. If they get Yahtzee in three rolls or less, they win a prize.

==== Barrel of Monkeys ====
To win the game, the only family playing pulls virtual monkey chains of varying lengths out of ten big lettered barrels ranging from A to J and correctly hangs them in sequential order on one of five colored trees. But it is not as easy as it sounds. The family has to be strategic when placing each monkey chain to win the game. For example, if a family picks a barrel with a chain of nine animated monkeys and places it on the red tree on the far right, they could potentially lose the game if the next barrel they pick has a chain of ten monkeys. To help them out, one barrel's dubbed the Top Banana & if chosen, gives the family a save in case they make a mistake. An animated monkey will show the viewers which lettered barrel the Top Banana is located before the game starts.

==== Bop It! Boptagon ====
Though fundamentally the same as Season 3, the Boptagon has been altered. The "Whack It" and "Kick It" commands have been replaced with "Lift It" and "Dunk It" commands.

==== Monopoly Community Chest ====
The Monopoly Community Chest has been altered. Before, contestants manually changed the combination lock to the three colors on their cards. This season, a slot was added for the combination cards to be inserted into so that the combination would automatically light up on the combination lock. If the light flashes red, the chest remains locked and they'll go back into the studio audience. If the light flashes green, then the chest will unlock and the family will advance to the Monopoly Crazy Cash Machine for more money and a brand-new car. If only one family remains, then their combination will win for them.

==== Monopoly Crazy Cash Machine ====
Same rules as Season 3, but the only difference is that the Iron card has been replaced by the Cat card (since the Cat replaces the Iron in the MONOPOLY board games.)

=== Season 5 ===
The same games that were in Season 4 return, but now the show features celebrities playing alongside the families in various episodes. A victory awards $10,000 to a charity while a loss still awards half that amount, or $5,000, to a charity of their choice. A WWE special was produced as well, featuring WWE Superstars Cameron and Mike "The Miz" Mizanin, in which the stars would serve as teammates for the families. The celebrities are not eligible to participate in either the Monopoly Community Chest or the Monopoly Crazy Cash Machine.

==== Sorry! ====
The silver card is replaced by the yellow card as well as some visual changes to the cards.

==== Jenga ====
The rules are the same. Players now take blocks out of the mini Jenga tower to know how many blocks players need to pull and stack on the tower.

== Famous Contestants ==
Josie Totah and her mother were contestants in a season 4 episode and would play "Barrel of Monkeys"

In a season 5 episode, Trinitee Stokes and her mom and dad would appear as contestants and play "Monopoly Remix"

== International versions ==
Country	Name	Host	Network	Date premiered
New Zealand	Family Game Night	?	Three	2022
Spain	Juegos en familia	Emilio Pineda	Boing	October 7, 2011 – July 8, 2013
