= List of ice hockey video games =

This is a list of video games that have the sport of ice hockey as their subject.

== Video games ==
Title	Release date	Platform(s)	Published by
Hockey!/Soccer!	1979	Odyssey 2	Magnavox
NHL Hockey	1980	Intellivision	Mattel Electronics
Ice Hockey	1981	Atari 2600	Activision
Hockey	1981	Atari 8-bit	Gamma Software
Bull Fighter	1984	Arcade	Alpha Denshi
Hat Trick	1984	Arcade; Atari 7800; C64	Capcom
International Hockey (US) Slap Shot (Europe)	1985	C64	Advantage Artworx (US) Anirog (Europe)
Great Ice Hockey	1986	Master System	Sega
Superstar Ice Hockey	1987	C64	Mindscape
Face Off!	1987	C64; MS-DOS	Gamestar
Blades of Steel	December 1988	Arcade; NES	Konami
Ice Hockey	January 21, 1988	NES	
Wayne Gretzky Hockey	1988	MS-DOS, Amiga	Bethesda Softworks
Power Play Hockey: USA vs USSR	1988	C64	Electronic Arts
Hockey League Simulator	1989	MS-DOS, Amiga	Bethesda Softworks
Slap Shot	1990	Arcade; Master System	Sega
Wayne Gretzky Hockey	1991	NES	THQ
Mario Lemieux Hockey	1991	Genesis	Sega
TV Sports Hockey	1991	TurboGrafx-16	NEC Home Electronics
NHL Hockey, EA Hockey	1991	Genesis	EA Sports
NHLPA Hockey '93	September 7, 1992	SNES; Genesis	EA Sports
Hit the Ice	1992	Arcade; SNES; Genesis; TurboGrafx-16; Game Boy	Williams, Taito
Hockey League Simulator 2	1992	MS-DOS	Bethesda Softworks
International Ice Hockey	1992	C64	Zeppelin Games
NHL Stanley Cup	June 1, 1993	SNES	Nintendo
Pro Sport Hockey	1993	NES; SNES	Jaleco Entertainment
Brett Hull Hockey	1993	Genesis; SNES	Accolade
NHL '94	1993	SNES (as NHL Pro Hockey '94 in Japan) Genesis; Sega CD; MS-DOS (as NHL Hockey)	EA Sports
Karamalz Cup	1993	C64	64'er
Mutant League Hockey	1994	Genesis	Electronic Arts
ESPN National Hockey Night	1994	SNES Genesis; Sega CD	Sony Imagesoft
NHL 95	1994	SNES; Genesis; Game Gear (as NHL Hockey); Game Boy; TV Game	EA Sports; TV Game version released by Jakks Pacific (with the permission of Electronic Arts)
Wayne Gretzky and the NHLPA All-Stars	1995	SNES; Genesis	Time Warner Interactive
NHL All-Star Hockey '95	June 15, 1995	Genesis	Sega Sports
2 On 2 Open Ice Challenge	1995	Arcade; PC; PlayStation	Midway Games
NHL 96	1995	PC; SNES; Genesis; Game Boy	EA Sports
NHL FaceOff	November 30, 1995	PlayStation	989 Studios
NHL All-Star Hockey	1995	Saturn	Sega Sports
Ultra Hockey	1995	Arcade	Konami
NHL PowerPlay '96	July 1, 1996	PC; Saturn; PlayStation	Virgin Interactive
NHL 97	1996	PC; PlayStation SNES; Genesis; Saturn	EA Sports
NHL FaceOff '97	October 23, 1996	PlayStation	989 Studios
Wayne Gretzky's 3D Hockey	1996	Arcade; Nintendo 64	Williams Entertainment, Atari Games
NHL 98	1997	PC; PlayStation; SNES; Genesis; Saturn	EA Sports
NHL FaceOff 98	1997	PlayStation	989 Studios
NHL Powerplay 98	September 1997	PC; PlayStation	Virgin Interactive
NHL All-Star Hockey '98	October 31, 1997	Saturn	Sega Sports
Wayne Gretzky's 3D Hockey '98/Olympic Hockey '98	December 1997 / February 1998	Nintendo 64; PlayStation	Midway Games
NHL Breakaway 98	1998	Nintendo 64; PlayStation; Saturn; PC	Acclaim Sports
NHL 99	September 30, 1998	PC; PlayStation; Nintendo 64	EA Sports
NHL FaceOff 99	1998	PlayStation	989 Studios
NHL Breakaway 99	1998	Nintendo 64	Acclaim Sports
NHL Blades of Steel '99	April 5, 1999	Nintendo 64; Game Boy Color	Konami
Actua Ice Hockey 2	April 1999	PC; PlayStation	Gremlin Interactive
NHL Championship 2000	September 30, 1999; November 3, 1999	PC; PlayStation	Fox Sports Interactive
NHL 2000	August 31, 1999	PC; PlayStation; Game Boy Color	EA Sports
NHL FaceOff 2000	1999	PlayStation	989 Studios
NHL Blades of Steel 2000	February 2000	PlayStation; Game Boy Color	Konami
NHL 2K	February 9, 2000	Dreamcast	Sega Sports
NHL Rock the Rink	February 29, 2000	PlayStation	Electronic Arts
NHL 2001	September 26, 2000	PC; PlayStation 2 PlayStation	EA Sports
NHL FaceOff 2001	2000	PlayStation 2 PlayStation	989 Studios
NHL FaceOff 2002	2001	PlayStation 2	989 Studios
NHL 2002	2001	PC; PlayStation 2 Xbox; Game Boy Advance	EA Sports
NHL Hitz 20-02	2001	PlayStation 2 Xbox; GameCube	Midway Games
ESPN National Hockey Night	March 25, 2001	PlayStation 2 Game Boy Color	Konami
Eastside Hockey Manager	October 24, 2001	PC	EHM-Team
NHL 2K2	February 14, 2002	Dreamcast	Sega Sports
NHL Hitz 20-03	September 16, 2002	PlayStation 2 Xbox; GameCube; Game Boy Advance	Midway Sports
NHL 2003	September 30, 2002	PC; PlayStation 2 Xbox; GameCube	EA Sports
NHL 2K3	November 19, 2002	GameCube; PlayStation 2 Xbox	Sega Sports
NHL FaceOff 2003	2002	PlayStation 2	989 Studios
Backyard Hockey	2002	PC	Infogrames
ESPN NHL Hockey	September 9, 2003	PlayStation 2 Xbox	ESPN Video games, Sega
NHL 2004	September 22, 2003	PC; PlayStation 2 Xbox; GameCube	EA Sports
NHL Hitz Pro	September 25, 2003	PlayStation 2 Xbox; GameCube	Midway Sports
NHL Rivals 2004	November 18, 2003	Xbox	Microsoft Games
Backyard Hockey	2003	Game Boy Advance	Atari
Hockey Mania	2003	C64	Protovision
Hockey.tk	2004	Windows	Jouko Pynnönen
ESPN NHL 2K5	August 30, 2004	PlayStation 2 Xbox	ESPN Video games, Sega
NHL 2005	September 14, 2004	PC; PlayStation 2 Xbox; GameCube	EA Sports
NHL Eastside Hockey Manager	October 19, 2004	PC	Sports Interactive
Gretzky NHL 2005	November 9, 2004 (PS2); March 14, 2005 (PSP)	PlayStation 2 PSP (as Gretzky NHL)	Sony Computer Entertainment
Backyard Hockey 2005	2004	PC	Atari
NHL 06	September 6, 2005	PC; PlayStation 2 Xbox; GameCube	EA Sports
NHL 2K6	September 6, 2005	Xbox 360; PlayStation 2 Xbox	2K Games
Gretzky NHL 2006	September 20, 2005	PlayStation 2 PSP	Sony Computer Entertainment
NHL: Eastside Hockey Manager 2005	October 5, 2005	PC	Sports Interactive
NHL 5-On-5 2006	November 2005	Mobile	
NHL 07	September 12, 2006	PC; PlayStation 2 PSP; Xbox; Xbox 360	EA Sports
NHL 2K7	September 12, 2006; October 2, 2006; November 13, 2006	PlayStation 2 Xbox; Xbox 360; PlayStation 3	2K Sports
NHL: Eastside Hockey Manager 2007	September 22, 2006	PC	Sports Interactive
NHL 2K8	September 11, 2007	PlayStation 2 PlayStation 3 Xbox 360	2K Sports
NHL 08	September 12, 2007	PC; PlayStation 3 Xbox 360; PlayStation 2	EA Sports
Backyard Hockey	2007	Nintendo DS	Atari
Kidz Sports Ice Hockey	January 14, 2008	Wii	Data Design Interactive; Destineer; Bold Games
NHL 2K9	September 9, 2008	PlayStation 2 PlayStation 3 Xbox 360; Wii	2K Sports
NHL 09	September 11, 2008	PC; PlayStation 3 Xbox 360; PlayStation 2	EA Sports
3 on 3 NHL Arcade	February 11, 2009	Xbox 360; PlayStation 3	EA Sports
NHL 2K10	September 15, 2009	PlayStation 2 PlayStation 3 Xbox 360; Wii	2K Sports
NHL 10	September 15, 2009	PlayStation 3 Xbox 360	EA Sports
Mario & Sonic at the Olympic Winter Games	October 23, 2009	Wii; Nintendo DS	Sega
NHL 2K11	August 24, 2010	Wii iOS	2K Sports
NHL 11	September 7, 2010	PlayStation 3 Xbox 360	EA Sports
NHL Slapshot	September 7, 2010	Wii	EA Sports
Mario Sports Mix	November 25, 2010	Wii	Nintendo
NHL 12	September 13, 2011	PlayStation 3 Xbox 360	EA Sports
Hockey?	January 1, 2012	PC	Cryptic Sea
NHL 13	September 11, 2012	PlayStation 3 Xbox 360	EA Sports
Hockey Action	October 9, 2012	Xbox 360	A Name Not Yet Taken AB
Franchise Hockey Manager 14	September 3, 2013	PC	OOTP Developments
NHL 14	September 10, 2013	PlayStation 3 Xbox 360	EA Sports
Mario & Sonic at the Sochi Olympic Winter Games	November 8, 2009	Wii U	Nintendo
GM Hockey Legacy 2013/14	January 28, 2014	PC	Logique Eclectic, Inc.
NHL 15	September 9, 2014	PlayStation 4 Xbox One; PlayStation 3 Xbox 360	EA Sports
NHL 16 EASHL Beta	July 30, 2015	PlayStation 4 Xbox One	EA Sports
NHL: Legacy Edition	September 9, 2015	PlayStation 3 Xbox 360	EA Sports
NHL 16	September 15, 2015	PlayStation 4 Xbox One	EA Sports
Eastside Hockey Manager	December 1, 2015	PC	Sega
NHL 17	September 13, 2016	PlayStation 4 Xbox One	EA Sports
Hockey Universe 2016	October 16, 2015	PC	Bionic Salmon
Hockey Universe Multiplayer	September 7, 2016	PC	Bionic Salmon
Destinée Hockey	October 1, 2016	PC	Bionic Salmon
Super Blood Hockey	August 17, 2017	PC	Loren Lemcke
Bush Hockey League	2017	PC; PlayStation 4 Xbox One	V7 Entertainment
NHL 18	September 15, 2017	PlayStation 4 Xbox One	EA Sports
Mini Hockey Champ!	November 2, 2017	Windows	26k
NHL 19	September 14, 2018	PlayStation 4 Xbox One	EA Sports
Slapshot	March 8, 2019	Windows	Oddshot Games
NHL 20	September 13, 2019	PlayStation 4 Xbox One	EA Sports
Slapshot: Rebound	December 7, 2020	Windows	Oddshot Games
NHL 21	October 16, 2020	PlayStation 4 Xbox One	EA Sports
Hoser Hockey	December 1, 2020	Windows	Sam
NHL 22	October 12, 2021	PlayStation 4 Xbox One; PlayStation 5 Xbox Series X Xbox Series S	EA Sports
NHL 23	October 14, 2022	PlayStation 4 Xbox One; PlayStation 5 Xbox Series X Xbox Series S	EA Sports
Tape to Tape	May 3, 2023	Windows	Excellent Rectangle
NHL 24	October 6, 2023	PlayStation 4 PlayStation 5 Xbox One; Xbox Series X Xbox Series S	EA Sports
Goons: Legends & Mayhem	April 11, 2024	Windows; PlayStation 5 Xbox Series X Xbox Series S	Firestoke Games
NHL 25	October 4, 2024	PlayStation 5 Xbox Series X/S	EA Sports
Puck	January 4, 2025	Windows	Nils Asejevs
Shoresy: Legends of the North	July 24, 2025	Windows	Treewood Games
NHL 26	September 12, 2025	PlayStation 5 Xbox Series X/S	EA Sports

== See also ==
- NHL (video game series)
- NHL 2K
- Ice hockey in popular culture
- Sports game
