= Visual Concepts =

American video game developer

Visual Concepts Entertainment
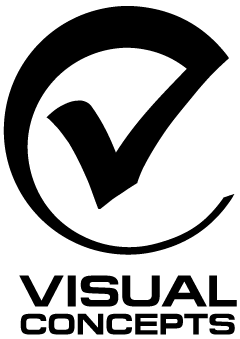
- Logo since 2018
- Type: Subsidiary
- Industry: Video games
- Founded: 1988; 38 years ago
- Founders: Scott Patterson; Greg Thomas; Jeff Thomas
- Headquarters: Novato, California, US
- Key people: Greg Thomas (president)
- Number of employees: 350+ (2018)
- Parent: Sega (1999–2005); 2K (2005–present)
- Divisions: VC Austin; VC Blueshift; VC Budapest; VC China; VC Irvine; VC Korea; VC Novato; VC South; VC WWE
- Website: vcentertainment.com

Visual Concepts Entertainment is an American video game developer based in Novato, California. Founded in May 1988, the company is best known for developing sports games in the 2K franchise, most recently NBA 2K and WWE 2K, and previously NFL 2K. Visual Concepts was acquired by Sega in May 1999 and sold to Take-Two Interactive in January 2005. The acquisition of the company led Take-Two Interactive to open their 2K label which Visual Concepts became part of, on the day following the acquisition. As of December 2018, the company employs more than 350 people.

== History ==
Logo used until 2018

Visual Concepts was founded in 1988 by programmer Scott Patterson and brothers Greg and Jeff Thomas, and was originally based in a small office above a bank in Novato, California. In 1992, programmer Cary Hammer, who worked as a freelancer for the company left to found Unexpected Development. In 1994, more employees left to found Tiburon Entertainment, mainly to take production of the Madden NFL game franchise. On January 25, 1995, Electronic Arts announced that they had acquired a stake in the company. In September 1997, Sega announced their intentions to acquire the company; the deal was closed on May 18, 1999, and Visual Concepts switched ownership for an undisclosed sum.

Following a June 2004 deal between Sega and Take-Two Interactive, wherein the two would co-publish and distribute titles in Visual Concepts' ESPN-based game series, rumors started spreading in December 2004, which suggested that Take-Two Interactive was planning to acquire Visual Concepts from Sega. On January 24, 2005, Take-Two Interactive announced to have completed a transaction of US$24 million to Sega for the acquisition of Visual Concepts, its subsidiary Kush Games, and the intellectual property to the 2K franchise. The publisher's 2006 Form 10-K filing later showed that a total of US$32.2 million had been paid to Sega for the acquisition of Visual Concepts and affiliated properties by January 2006. On January 25, 2005, the day following the acquisition, Take-Two Interactive announced their new publishing label, 2K, which would henceforth manage Visual Concepts and Kush Games.

A March 2009 research study on Metacritic scores, conducted by GameQuarry, ranked Visual Concepts as the number one "most consistent" video game developer on the review aggregator website, with 50 out of their 72 games at the time having received an aggregated review score of 80/100 or higher. In August 2010, Visual Concepts laid off 30 employees due to "the need for resource alignment and better efficiency". In December 2018, at The Game Awards 2018, Greg Thomas was honored with the "Industry Icon" award for his 30-year services with Visual Concepts.

2K acquired HookBang's game division, which had worked with Visual Concepts on the NBA 2K games previously, in March 2021. The division was rebranded as Visual Concepts Austin to continue to support Visual Concepts. In February 2024, an unknown number of employees at Visual Concepts Austin were affected by layoffs.

== Games developed ==
=== 1989–2004 ===
Year	Title	Platform(s)
1989	Gnarly Golf	Apple IIGS
1989	Great Western Shootout	Apple IIGS
1989	Sword of Sodan (unreleased)	Apple IIGS
1990	Designasaurus II	MS-DOS
1990	Pipe Mania	Apple IIGS
1990	Task Force	Apple IIGS
1991	Trog	NES
1991	MathCopter	MS-DOS
1992	McDonaldland	Game Boy
1992	Spot: The Cool Adventure	Game Boy
1992	Star Trek: 25th Anniversary	Game Boy
1992	Desert Strike: Return to the Gulf	Super NES
1993	Bill Walsh College Football	Super NES
1993	ClayFighter	Super NES
1993	Harley's Humongous Adventure	Super NES
1993	Madden NFL '94	Super NES
1993	Taz-Mania	Super NES
1993	We're Back! A Dinosaur's Story	Super NES
1994	ClayFighter: Tournament Edition	Super NES
1994	Claymates	Super NES
1994	Dominus	MS-DOS
1994	Lester the Unlikely	Super NES
1994	Madden NFL '95	Super NES
1994	MLBPA Baseball	Super NES
1994	NHL 95	Super NES
1995	Toughman Contest	Sega Genesis
1995	WeaponLord	Sega Genesis, Super NES
1995	Viewpoint	PlayStation
1995	Madden NFL '96	PlayStation (cancelled)
1996	NHL 97	PlayStation, Sega Saturn
1997	NBA Action 98	Microsoft Windows, Sega Saturn
1997	NBA Fastbreak '98	PlayStation
1998	One	PlayStation
1999	NBA 2K	Dreamcast
1999	NFL 2K	Dreamcast
1999	NHL 2K	Dreamcast
2000	NBA 2K1	Dreamcast
2000	NFL 2K1	Dreamcast
2001	Floigan Bros.	Dreamcast
2001	NBA 2K2	Dreamcast, GameCube, PlayStation 2, Xbox
2001	NCAA College Football 2K2: Road to the Rose Bowl	Dreamcast
2001	NFL 2K2	Dreamcast, PlayStation 2, Xbox
2001	NHL 2K2	Dreamcast, PlayStation 2, Xbox
2001	Ooga Booga	Dreamcast
2001	World Series Baseball 2K2	Dreamcast, Xbox
2002	NBA 2K3	GameCube, PlayStation 2, Xbox
2002	NCAA College Basketball 2K3	GameCube, PlayStation 2, Xbox
2002	NCAA College Football 2K3	GameCube, PlayStation 2, Xbox
2002	NFL 2K3	GameCube, PlayStation 2, Xbox
2002	NHL 2K3	GameCube, PlayStation 2, Xbox
2002	Sega Soccer Slam	GameCube, PlayStation 2, Xbox
2002	ToeJam & Earl III: Mission to Earth	Xbox
2003	ESPN College Hoops	PlayStation 2, Xbox
2003	ESPN NBA Basketball	PlayStation 2, Xbox
2003	ESPN NHL Hockey	PlayStation 2, Xbox
2003	ESPN NFL Football	PlayStation 2, Xbox
2003	World Series Baseball 2K3	PlayStation 2, Xbox
2004	ESPN College Hoops 2K5	PlayStation 2, Xbox
2004	ESPN NBA 2K5	PlayStation 2, Xbox
2004	ESPN NFL 2K5	PlayStation 2, Xbox
2004	ESPN NHL 2K5	PlayStation 2, Xbox
2004	ESPN Major League Baseball	PlayStation 2, Xbox

=== 2005–present ===
Year	Title	Platform(s)	Notes
2005	College Hoops 2K6	PlayStation 2, Xbox, Xbox 360	
2005	Major League Baseball 2K5	PlayStation 2, Xbox	Assisted Kush Games
2005	Major League Baseball 2K5: World Series Edition	PlayStation 2, Xbox	Assisted Kush Games
2005	NBA 2K6	PlayStation 2, Xbox, Xbox 360	
2005	NHL 2K6	PlayStation 2, Xbox, Xbox 360	Assisted Kush Games
2006	College Hoops 2K7	PlayStation 2, PlayStation 3, Xbox, Xbox 360	
2006	Major League Baseball 2K6	GameCube, PlayStation 2, PlayStation Portable, Xbox, Xbox 360	Assisted Kush Games
2006	NBA 2K7	PlayStation 2, PlayStation 3, Xbox, Xbox 360	
2006	NHL 2K7	PlayStation 2, PlayStation 3, Xbox, Xbox 360	Assisted Kush Games
2007	All-Pro Football 2K8	PlayStation 3, Xbox 360	
2007	College Hoops 2K8	PlayStation 2, PlayStation 3, Xbox 360	
2007	Fantastic Four: Rise of the Silver Surfer	PlayStation 3, Xbox 360	
2007	Major League Baseball 2K7	PlayStation 2, PlayStation 3, PlayStation Portable, Xbox, Xbox 360	Assisted Kush Games
2007	NBA 2K8	PlayStation 2, PlayStation 3, Xbox 360	
2007	NHL 2K8	PlayStation 2, PlayStation 3, Xbox 360	Assisted 2K Los Angeles
2007	The Bigs	PlayStation 2, PlayStation 3, PlayStation Portable, Wii, Xbox 360	Assisted Blue Castle Games
2008	Major League Baseball 2K8	PlayStation 2, PlayStation 3, PlayStation Portable, Xbox 360	Assisted 2K Los Angeles
2008	NBA 2K9	Microsoft Windows, PlayStation 2, PlayStation 3, Xbox 360	
2008	NHL 2K9	PlayStation 2, PlayStation 3, Wii, Xbox 360	
2009	Major League Baseball 2K9	Microsoft Windows, PlayStation 2, PlayStation 3, Xbox 360	
2009	NBA 2K10	Microsoft Windows, PlayStation 2, PlayStation 3, Wii, Xbox 360	
2009	NBA 2K10: Draft Combine	PlayStation 3, Xbox 360	
2009	NHL 2K10	PlayStation 2, PlayStation 3, Wii, Xbox 360	
2010	Major League Baseball 2K10	Microsoft Windows, PlayStation 3, Xbox 360	
2010	NBA 2K11	Microsoft Windows, PlayStation 2, PlayStation 3, Wii, Xbox 360	
2010	NHL 2K11	Wii	
2011	Major League Baseball 2K11	Microsoft Windows, PlayStation 3, Wii, Xbox 360	
2011	NBA 2K12	Microsoft Windows, PlayStation 3, Wii, Xbox 360	
2012	Major League Baseball 2K12	Microsoft Windows, PlayStation 3, Xbox 360	
2012	MyNBA 2K	Android, iOS	
2012	NBA 2K13	Microsoft Windows, PlayStation 3, Wii U, Xbox 360	
2012	NBA 2K MyLife	Facebook Platform	
2013	Major League Baseball 2K13	PlayStation 3, Xbox 360	
2013	NBA 2K14	Android, Fire OS, iOS, Microsoft Windows, PlayStation 3, PlayStation 4, Xbox 360, Xbox One	
2013	WWE 2K14	PlayStation 3, Xbox 360	Assisted Yuke's
2014	NBA 2K15	Android, Fire OS, iOS, Microsoft Windows, PlayStation 3, PlayStation 4, Xbox 360, Xbox One	
2014	NHL 2K	Android, iOS	Assisted Virtuos
2014	WWE 2K15	Microsoft Windows, PlayStation 3, PlayStation 4, Xbox 360, Xbox One	Assisted Yuke's
2015	NBA 2K16	Android, iOS, Microsoft Windows, PlayStation 3, PlayStation 4, Xbox 360, Xbox One	
2015	WWE 2K16	Microsoft Windows, PlayStation 3, PlayStation 4, Xbox 360, Xbox One	Assisted Yuke's
2016	NBA 2K17	Android, iOS, Microsoft Windows, PlayStation 3, PlayStation 4, Xbox 360, Xbox One	
2016	NBA 2K17: The Prelude	PlayStation 4, Xbox One	
2016	NBA 2KVR Experience	Android, Microsoft Windows, PlayStation 4	Assisted Specular Interactive
2016	WWE 2K17	Microsoft Windows, PlayStation 3, PlayStation 4, Xbox 360, Xbox One	Assisted Yuke's
2017	NBA 2K18	Android, iOS, Microsoft Windows, Nintendo Switch, PlayStation 3, PlayStation 4, Xbox 360, Xbox One	
2017	NBA 2K18: The Prelude	PlayStation 4, Xbox One	
2017	WWE 2K18	Microsoft Windows, PlayStation 4, Xbox One	Assisted Yuke's
2018	NBA 2K19	Android, iOS, Microsoft Windows, Nintendo Switch, PlayStation 4, Xbox One	
2018	NBA 2K19: The Prelude	PlayStation 4, Xbox One	
2018	WWE 2K19	Microsoft Windows, PlayStation 4, Xbox One	Assisted Yuke's
2019	NBA 2K20	Stadia, Microsoft Windows, Nintendo Switch, PlayStation 4, Xbox One	
2019	WWE 2K20	Microsoft Windows, PlayStation 4, Xbox One	
2020	NBA 2K21	Stadia, Microsoft Windows, Nintendo Switch, PlayStation 4, Xbox One, PlayStation 5, Xbox Series X/S	
2021	NBA 2K22	Microsoft Windows, Nintendo Switch, PlayStation 4, Xbox One, PlayStation 5, Xbox Series X/S	
2022	WWE 2K22	Microsoft Windows, PlayStation 4, Xbox One, PlayStation 5, Xbox Series X/S	
2022	NBA 2K23	Microsoft Windows, Nintendo Switch, PlayStation 4, Xbox One, PlayStation 5, Xbox Series X/S	
2023	WWE 2K23	Microsoft Windows, PlayStation 4, Xbox One, PlayStation 5, Xbox Series X/S	
2023	Lego 2K Drive	Microsoft Windows, Nintendo Switch, PlayStation 4, Xbox One, PlayStation 5, Xbox Series X/S	
2023	NBA 2K24	Microsoft Windows, Nintendo Switch, PlayStation 4, Xbox One, PlayStation 5, Xbox Series X/S	
2024	WWE 2K24	Microsoft Windows, PlayStation 4, Xbox One, PlayStation 5, Xbox Series X/S	
2024	NBA 2K25	Microsoft Windows, Nintendo Switch, PlayStation 4, Xbox One, PlayStation 5, Xbox Series X/S	
2025	WWE 2K25	Microsoft Windows, Nintendo Switch 2, PlayStation 4, PlayStation 5, Xbox One, Xbox Series X/S, Android, iOS	
2025	NBA 2K26	Microsoft Windows, Nintendo Switch, Nintendo Switch 2, PlayStation 4, PlayStation 5, Xbox One, Xbox Series X/S	
2026	WWE 2K26	Microsoft Windows, Nintendo Switch 2, PlayStation 5, Xbox Series X/S	
