= John Shrader =

American college professor

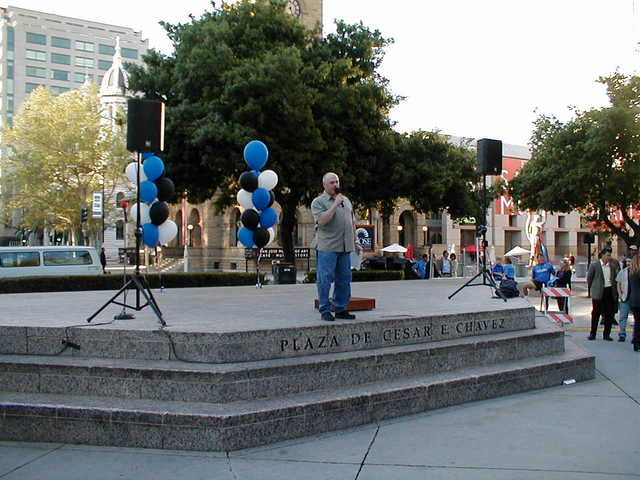
John Shrader

John W. Shrader (born c. 1957) is an American college professor and sports broadcaster, currently working in Nebraska. He is an assistant professor at the College of Journalism and Mass Communications at the University of Nebraska–Lincoln. He does LA Galaxy soccer play-by-play for Time Warner Cable SportsNet. He did play-by-play of the San Jose Earthquakes for Comcast SportsNet Bay Area and Comcast SportsNet California.

For 15 years, he was a sports anchor and talk show host for KNBR (680 AM), San Francisco, known locally as "The Sports Leader." In addition to his regular duties, Shrader was a sideline reporter for the San Francisco 49ers in 2005. He began his Northern California broadcasting career at KNTV (Channel 11) in San Jose as a weekend sports anchor before becoming the weekday sports anchor at KICU (Channel 36) in the same city. He started his broadcast career as a sportscaster and news reporter at NTV Network, KHGI-TV, in Kearney, Nebraska, and was also Sports Director of KHAS-TV in Hastings, Nebraska.

For nearly a decade, Shrader was the radio voice of San Jose State University sports. In 1988 and 1989, Shrader was on the television broadcast crew for the Oakland Athletics. In 2006, Shrader resigned his position with KNBR after 15 years, citing the new owner's difference of opinion regarding his worth to the station.

Shrader joined play-by-play announcer Randy Hahn and color analyst Drew Remenda on FSN Bay Area (now CSN Bay Area) as the San Jose Sharks intermission host and rink-side reporter for two seasons, beginning in 2007. He won an Emmy in 2009 for his work on a Stanley Cup playoff game.

Shrader has a Master's degree in Mass Communications from San Jose State (2008) and a Bachelor's degree in Journalism from the University of Nebraska–Lincoln. He is a native of Neligh, Nebraska.

== Trivia ==
- The likeness of John Shrader was used in NHL 95 by Electronic Arts. Shrader was used to introduce the games and the starting lineups for the two teams. He replaced the likeness of Ron Barr, who introduced the games in NHLPA Hockey 93 and NHL 94. He also introduces tournaments in PGA Tour III and games in MLBPA Baseball, both also by Electronic Arts.
- John Shrader lends his voice to the video game NHL 2K9 by Take2 where he appears as the Intermission Host / Rinkside Reporter, and has done so in NHL 2K10 and NHL 2K11 as well.

He does play-by-play commentary for Los Angeles Galaxy on Time Warner Cable Sportsnet. He has also commentated upon college football and high school football on TWC Sportsnet.
