= NHL 2K =

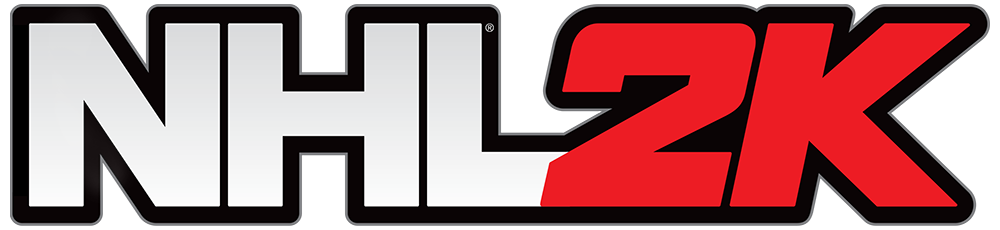
- Final logo of the series used in NHL 2K (2014)
- Genre: Sports
- Developers: Black Box Games (2000); Treyarch (2002); Kush Games (2003–2007); Visual Concepts (2008–2010); Visual Concepts China (2014); Virtuos (2014)
- Publishers: Sega Sports (2000–2004); 2K (2005–2014)
- Platforms: Dreamcast, PlayStation 2, Xbox, GameCube, Xbox 360, PlayStation 3, Wii, Android, iOS
- First release: NHL 2K; February 9, 2000
- Latest release: NHL 2K; October 23, 2014

NHL 2K was a series of hockey games developed by Visual Concepts. It was published by Sega Sports from 2000 to 2004, and 2K from 2005 to 2014. The games are officially licensed from the National Hockey League and NHL Players Association.

The series was initially developed for consoles, with its main competitor being EA Sports' NHL series. Beginning with the release of NHL 2K11 in 2010, the series would eventually become exclusive to mobile devices.

== Installments ==
Title	Release date	Console(s)	Cover athlete	Play-by-play announcer	Color commentator
Sega Sports (2000–2005)
NHL 2K	February 9, 2000	Dreamcast	Brendan Shanahan	Bob Cole	Harry Neale
NHL 2K2	February 14, 2002	Dreamcast	Chris Drury	Bob Miller	Michael Villani as Alex Crane
NHL 2K3	November 19, 2002	PlayStation 2, Xbox, GameCube	Jeremy Roenick	Michael A. Carlucci as Bill Peterson	Danny Mann as Mike Weese
ESPN NHL Hockey	September 9, 2003	PlayStation 2, Xbox	Jeremy Roenick	Gary Thorne	Bill Clement
ESPN NHL 2K5	August 30, 2004	PlayStation 2, Xbox	Martin St. Louis	Gary Thorne	Bill Clement
2K (2005–2014)
NHL 2K6	September 6, 2005	Xbox 360, PlayStation 2, Xbox	USA: Marty Turco; Europe/Canada: Mats Sundin	Bob Cole	Harry Neale
NHL 2K7	September 12, 2006	Xbox 360, PlayStation 2, Xbox, PlayStation 3	Most of World: Joe Thornton; Czech Republic: David Vyborny	Bob Cole	Harry Neale
NHL 2K8	September 11, 2007	Xbox 360, PlayStation 2, PlayStation 3	Jason Spezza	Bob Cole	Harry Neale
NHL 2K9	September 9, 2008	Xbox 360, PlayStation 2, PlayStation 3, Wii	Rick Nash	Randy Hahn	Drew Remenda
NHL 2K10	September 15, 2009	Xbox 360, PlayStation 2, PlayStation 3, Wii	Alexander Ovechkin	Randy Hahn	Drew Remenda
NHL 2K11	August 24, 2010	Wii, iPhone	Ryan Kesler	Randy Hahn	Drew Remenda
NHL 2K	October 23, 2014	iOS, Android	Ryan Kesler	None	

== History ==
=== Sega Sports ===
The series launched on the Dreamcast on February 7, 2000 as part of the Sega Sports line-up of sports titles. Its success led to it becoming one of the few Sega All Stars titles. The follow-up, NHL 2K2, was released on February 14, 2002, and was the last game released for the Dreamcast before the system was discontinued.

NHL 2K3 was released on November 19, 2002. It was the first in the series to feature a franchise mode, while the Xbox version became the first online console hockey game. Sega had signed a deal with Take-Two Interactive in which Global Star Software distributed and co-published Sega's ESPN sports games. ESPN NHL 2K5 was released on August 30, 2004, and was the last game in the series to be published by Sega, and the last to be released under the ESPN branding.

=== 2K Sports ===
==== NHL 2K6 and 2K7 ====
NHL 2K6 was soon released on September 7, 2005 as a launch title for the Xbox 360. It was the first game to be published under Take-Two's 2K company, after the acquisition of developer Visual Concepts. New features included a franchise mode, and a new 'goalie control' feature.

NHL 2K7, released on September 12, 2006, featured new animations, mainly geared towards skating, and 'Cinemotion' which is designed to capture the intensity of hockey through close up angles and orchestral music.

==== NHL 2K8 ====
NHL 2K8 was released in September 2007. The game features an all new face-off system which includes tie-ups, warnings, jostling, and penalties. The game also includes a new goaltending engine with improved goalies that react according to the situation. Goalies will challenge the puck carrier when appropriate, perform spectacular butterfly saves, and guard the post. Other features include variable attendance, a new skating engine, and authentic player equipment. Jason Spezza from the Ottawa Senators was on the cover.

==== NHL 2K9 ====
NHL 2K9 was released in September 2008, with Columbus Blue Jackets' captain Rick Nash as the cover athlete. NHL 2K9 was released on the Wii console, the first NHL licensed game to be released on the platform, in addition to the PlayStation 2, Xbox 360 and PlayStation 3.

==== NHL 2K10 ====
NHL 2K10 was released on September 15, 2009, with Washington Capitals left-winger Alexander Ovechkin on a special 10th Anniversary cover. The Wii version now sported online play, Mii Integration, and Wii MotionPlus. This is also the last game in the series to be released on the PlayStation 3, PlayStation 2 and Xbox 360. It was the last game in the series to be released on Microsoft and Sony consoles.

==== NHL 2K11 ====
NHL 2K11 was released on September 7, 2010 for iPhones and the Wii. On March 3, 2010 CEO Ben Feder explained that "We have decided to reevaluate our NHL strategy and will only be releasing NHL 2K11 for the Wii in fiscal year 2010. We want to become a stronger competitor in this category and taking a year off on PS3 and Xbox 360, while focusing on making the best possible game for Wii, should allow us to accomplish that goal." Vancouver Canucks forward Ryan Kesler was the cover athlete for the game.

=== Discontinuation ===
On May 25, 2011, 2K Sports confirmed the NHL 2K series would not be published on any console.

In September 2014, 2K Sports announced that the series would return exclusively on the iOS and Android platforms with NHL 2K. It would be the last game in the series.

== NHL SuperCard series ==
NHL SuperCard, a spin-off of the NHL 2K series, features gameplay that closely resembles Cat Daddy Games' WWE SuperCard and Take-Two Interactive's other mobile games. The first game was co-developed by Wahoo Studios, while Koolhaus Games developed the latter two instalments. All three games were released on iOS and Android platforms.

=== Games ===
- NHL SuperCard, released on October 8, 2015 and featured Zach Parise on the cover.
- NHL SuperCard 2K17, released on October 13, 2016 and featured Logan Couture on the cover.
- NHL SuperCard 2K18, released on October 10, 2017 and featured Kyle Turris on the cover.
