= 2K7 =

2K7 may refer to:

- the year 2007
- College Hoops 2K7, 2006 video game
- Dan the Automator Presents 2K7, NBA 2K7 soundtrack album
- Major League Baseball 2K7, 2007 video game
- NBA 2K7, 2006 video game
- NHL 2K7, 2006 video game
