= Ryan Kesler =

American ice hockey player (born 1984)

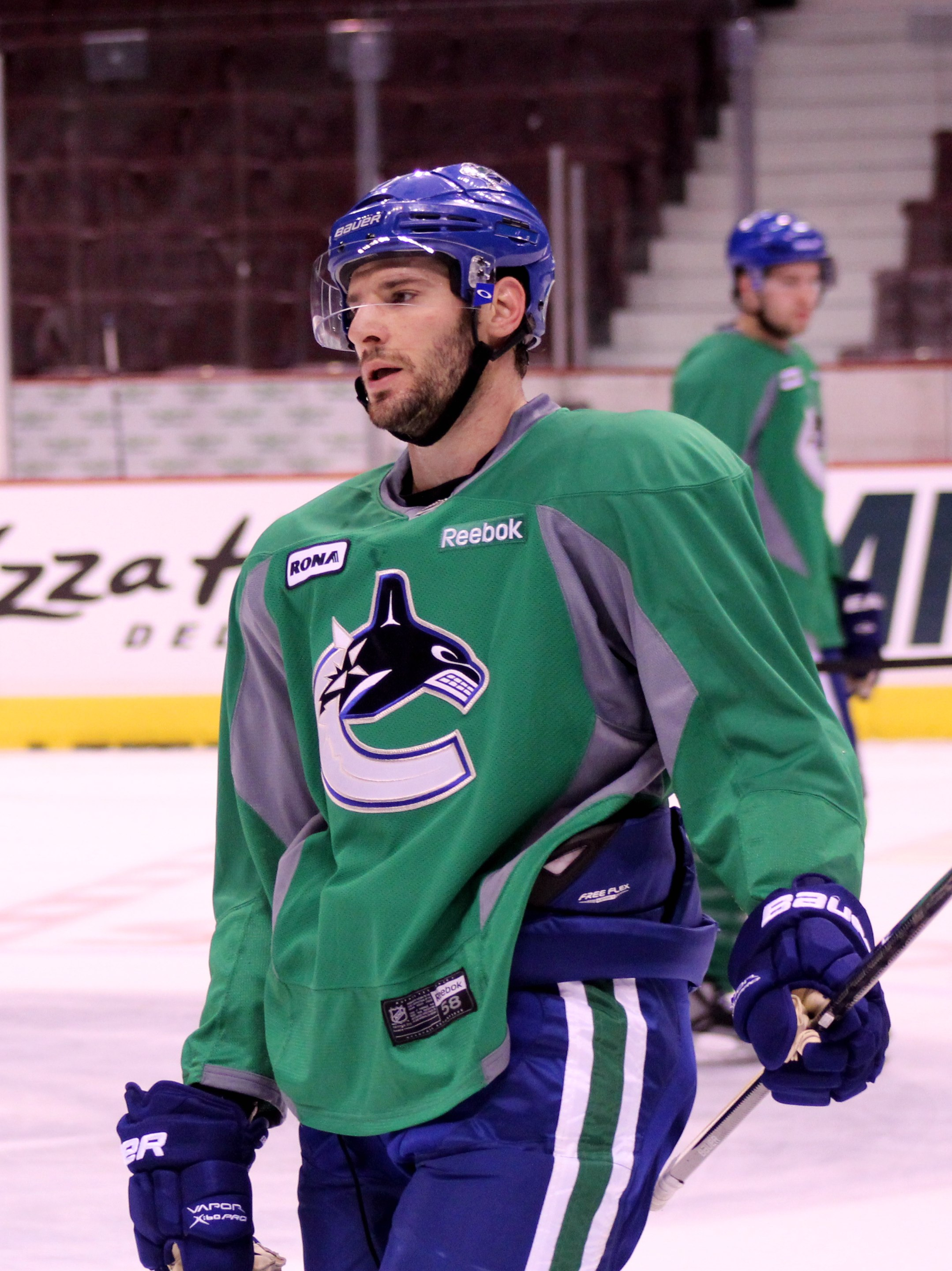
- Kesler with the Vancouver Canucks in March 2012
- Born: August 31, 1984 (age 42) Livonia, Michigan, U.S.
- Height: 6 ft 2 in (188 cm)
- Weight: 202 lb (92 kg; 14 st 6 lb)
- Position: Center
- Shot: Right
- Played for: Vancouver Canucks; Anaheim Ducks
- National team: United States
- NHL draft: 23rd overall, 2003; Vancouver Canucks
- Playing career: 2003–2019

Ryan James Kesler (born August 31, 1984) is an American former professional ice hockey player. A center, Kesler spent the first 10 years of his National Hockey League (NHL) career with the Vancouver Canucks; in 2014 he was traded to the Anaheim Ducks, with whom he spent the rest of his career. He is best known for being a two-way forward and his agitating style of play, winning the Selke Trophy in 2011 while also being a finalist for the award in 2009, 2010, 2016 and 2017.

Kesler played junior ice hockey with the USA Hockey National Team Development Program from which he then accepted a scholarship to play college ice hockey with the Ohio State Buckeyes of the Central Collegiate Hockey Association (CCHA). In one season with the Buckeyes, he was an honorable mention for the CCHA All-Rookie Team and was named CCHA Rookie of the Week three times and CCHA Rookie of the Month once. In addition to the USA Hockey National Team Development Program and the Ohio State Buckeyes, Kesler has also suited up for the Manitoba Moose of the American Hockey League (AHL), where he was named to the 2005 AHL All-Star Game.

Kesler has represented the United States at seven International Ice Hockey Federation-sanctioned events, winning one World U18 Championship gold medal, one World Junior Championship gold medal, one Winter Olympics silver medal, and one World U-17 Hockey Challenge gold medal.

== Early life ==
Kesler was born on August 31, 1984, in Livonia, Michigan, to Linda and Mike Kesler. He is the youngest of three children, after brother Todd and sister Jenny. His father, Mike, played college ice hockey at Colorado College and was a supervisor with the Blue Cross and Blue Shield Association for 37 years. He introduced his children to the ice at a very young age; Ryan recalls skating at around age four. Mike also coaches a Junior B ice hockey team and runs an ice hockey school in Livonia, which Kesler attended as a child every summer from the age of six to seventeen. In April 2007, Mike was diagnosed with carcinoid cancer and had seven inches of his small intestine removed in order to be rid of it.

Kesler played minor ice hockey in Detroit for teams such as Compuware, Honeybaked and Little Caesars of the Midwest Elite Hockey League (MWEHL). He played in the 1998 Quebec International Pee-Wee Hockey Tournament with the Little Caesars team. Around age 13, Kesler was cut from every AAA team he tried out for. Consequently, he played for his dad's Livonia Hockey Association bantam team, which he coached. Kesler credits his brother, who is nine years older than him, for getting him into hockey. During his minor career, he established a lasting friendship with Chris Conner, who went on to be drafted by the Dallas Stars.

Despite growing up in Michigan near Detroit, he was a Minnesota North Stars fan. As a young hockey player, Kesler looked up to North Stars center and fellow Livonia native Mike Modano as a role model. He has also listed Joe Sakic of the Quebec Nordiques and Colorado Avalanche as a favorite player during his childhood.

== Playing career ==
=== Early career ===
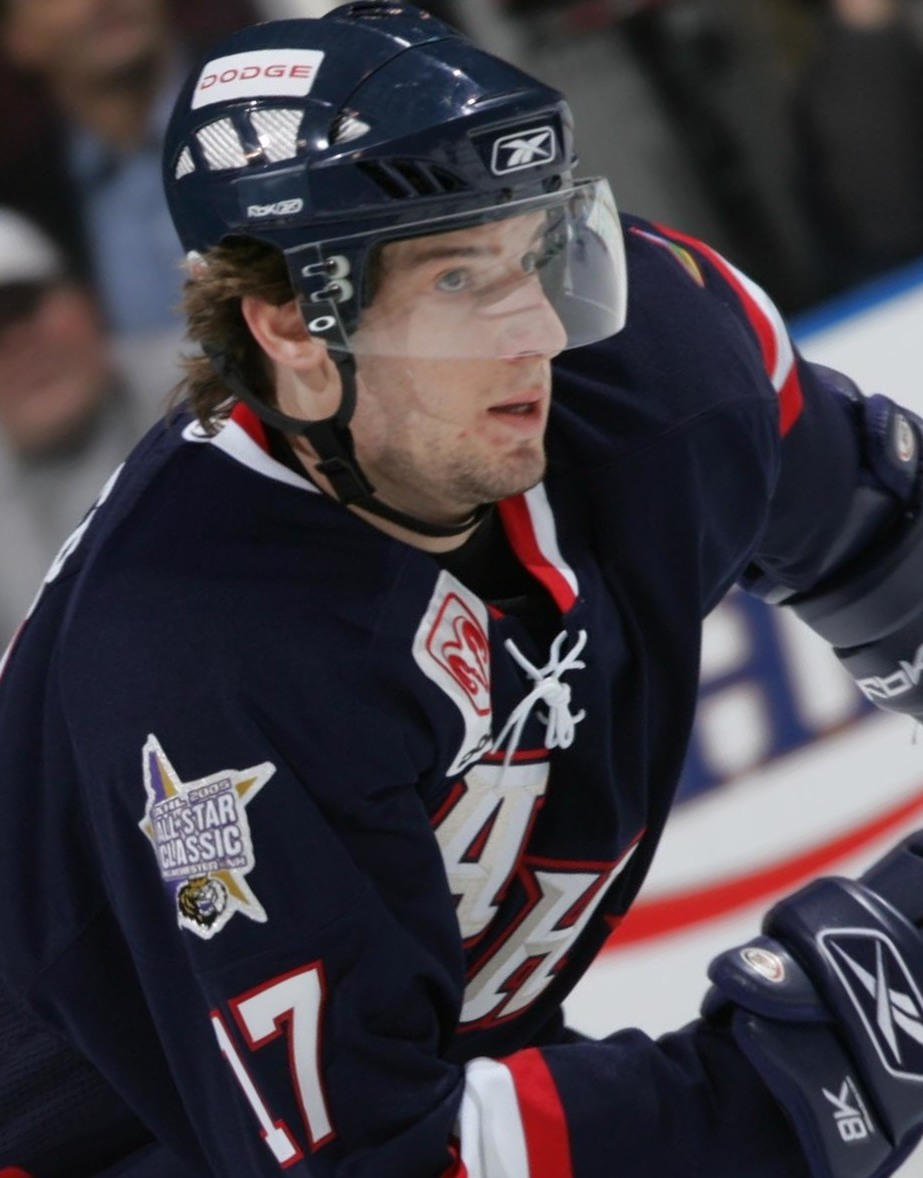
Kesler at the 2005 AHL All Star game

In June 2000, Kesler was drafted in the fifth round, 89th overall, by the Brampton Battalion in the Ontario Hockey League (OHL) Priority Selection. Despite being drafted by a Canadian OHL team, Kesler chose to play in the USA Hockey National Team Development Program (USNTDP) because of its close proximity to Livonia. This allowed Kesler to continue his high school education without leaving Winston Churchill High School. He entered the USNTDP for the 2000–01 season. Over his two seasons with the USNTDP, Kesler recorded 99 points in 131 games.

After two seasons with the USNTDP, Kesler accepted a scholarship to play college ice hockey at Ohio State University for the Ohio State Buckeyes of the Central Collegiate Hockey Association (CCHA). He chose Ohio State over the University of Wisconsin–Madison and its Wisconsin Badgers ice hockey program of the Western Collegiate Hockey Association (WCHA) because Ohio State was closer to Kesler's home in Livonia. As a freshman, Kesler scored 11 goals and 20 assists to finish fourth in team scoring behind junior and Hobey Baker Award finalist R. J. Umberger. Over the course of his freshman year, Kesler helped the Buckeyes to a third-place finish in the CCHA's regular season standings. At the 2003 CCHA Tournament, Kesler scored two goals as the Buckeye's finished in fourth place, losing to Northern Michigan 4–1 in the third-place game. Despite this finish, Ohio State secured an at-large bid to the 2003 NCAA Division I men's ice hockey tournament, the third appearance at the NCAA men's ice hockey championship in Ohio State's history. At the tournament, Ohio State suffered a 1–0 loss to Boston College in the opening round of the East Regional at the Dunkin' Donuts Center in Providence, Rhode Island, ending both the team's and Kesler's season.

Kesler's play as a freshman earned him an honorable mention for the CCHA All-Rookie Team. He was also named CCHA Rookie of the Week three times, CCHA Rookie of the Month once, and was awarded Ohio State's George Burke Most Valuable Freshman award. Following the season, Kesler entered the 2003 NHL entry draft ranked 16th overall among North American skaters. On June 21, 2003, he was drafted 23rd overall by the Vancouver Canucks.

Upon being drafted, Kesler considered returning to Ohio State for his sophomore season or joining the Brampton Battalion, who still held his OHL rights. However, on August 18, 2003, less than two months after being drafted, Kesler signed a three-year, $2.475-million entry-level contract with the Canucks, complemented by an $850,000 signing bonus. After attending Canucks training camp and playing in five preseason games, Kesler was cut by the Canucks and sent to their American Hockey League (AHL) affiliate, the Manitoba Moose.

=== Professional ===
==== Vancouver Canucks (2003–2014) ====
Kesler began his first professional season with the Manitoba Moose, but was recalled by the Canucks in November and made his NHL debut on November 24, 2003, in a 2–1 loss to the Toronto Maple Leafs, recording one shot on goal and 12:12 of ice time. He scored his first career NHL goal on November 29 against Calgary Flames goaltender Jamie McLennan in a 4–4 tie. For the remainder of the season, Kesler split time between the Canucks and the Moose, finishing his season with five points in 28 Canucks games and 11 points in 33 Moose games.

The 2004–05 NHL lockout, which cancelled the 2004–05 NHL season, forced Kesler to spend the entire season with the Moose. With Manitoba, Kesler emerged as one of the Canucks' top prospects. Midway through the season, Kesler was named to the PlanetUSA All-Star team for the 2005 AHL All-Star Game where he helped PlanetUSA defeat Team Canada for the first time in five years. Kesler finished third in team scoring with thirty goals and 57 points to be named the Moose's Most Valuable Player. Kesler added an additional nine points in 14 playoff games as the Moose advanced to the Western Conference finals before being swept by the Chicago Wolves.

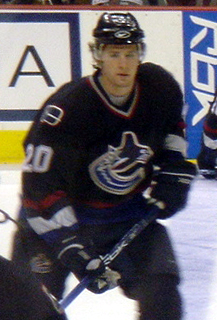
Kesler with the Canucks in October 2005. The 2005–06 season was Kesler's first full season in the NHL

When the NHL lockout ended and play resumed for the 2005–06 season, Kesler joined the Canucks for his first full season with the team, playing in all 82 games and finishing the season with 23 points (10 goals, 13 assists) as the Canucks came three points short of a playoff spot.

With his entry-level contract expiring in the 2006 off-season, Kesler rejected a $564,000 qualifying offer from the Canucks before becoming a restricted free agent on July 1, 2006. Unable to come to terms on a new deal with the Canucks, Kesler signed a one-year, $1.9-million offer sheet with the Philadelphia Flyers on September 12. The offer sheet from Flyers general manager Bobby Clarke was the first in the NHL since the Tampa Bay Lightning extended one to Brett Hauer in July 1999. The move was highly controversial, with many NHL general managers criticizing how Kesler's inflated salary would affect future free agent signings. The Canucks had one week to either match the offer or receive a second round draft pick from the Flyers in 2007 as compensation. Two days after the signing, the Canucks matched the Flyers' offer. After playing 48 games in the 2006–07 season, Kesler suffered a torn acetabular labrum in a game against the Buffalo Sabres on January 19, 2007, and missed the remainder of the season, finishing the season playing in 48 games with 16 points (six goals, 10 assists). Kesler returned to the Canucks lineup for the first game of their first round series in the 2007 playoffs on April 13 against the Dallas Stars, making his Stanley Cup playoff debut that day. While blocking a shot in the fourth overtime of the game, Kesler was re-injured, suffering a broken index finger. Despite finishing the game, Kesler was forced to undergo surgery to repair his finger and missed the remainder of the playoffs. In Kesler's absence, the Canucks defeated sixth-seeded Stars in seven games before getting defeated in five games by second-seeded and eventual Stanley Cup champion Anaheim Ducks.

On May 24, 2007, the Canucks re-signed Kesler to a three-year, $5.25 million contract extension. In comparison to his previous contract, facilitated by the Flyers' offer sheet, the deal represented a $150,000 pay cut in terms of average annual salary. On October 10, three games into 2007–08, Kesler was cross-checked in the face by Philadelphia Flyers forward Jesse Boulerice. The cross-check was an immediate response to Kesler hitting Flyers defenseman Randy Jones and resulted in Kesler leaving the game with a sore jaw. Boulerice was subsequently suspended for 25 games, matching the then largest suspension in NHL history. Later in the season, on March 12, 2008, Kesler was involved in another violent on-ice incident when Anaheim Ducks defenseman Chris Pronger used his skate blade to stomp on Kesler's calf. Kesler was not injured on the play. Although the NHL originally announced Pronger would not receive a suspension on the play, he later received an eight-game suspension when new video emerged of the incident. Over the course of the season, Kesler established himself as a solid two-way center, scoring what was then a career-high 21 goals and 16 assists for 37 points in 80 games and playing a regular shutdown role against opposing teams' top players and on the penalty kill with linemate Alexandre Burrows. Despite his improved individual play and increased role within the team, the Canucks failed to qualify for the playoffs for the second time in three seasons, coming three points back from the last playoff spot.

With the departures of Markus Näslund, Brendan Morrison and Trevor Linden following the 2008 off-season, the Canucks were left without any captains for the 2008–09 season. On September 30, 2008, Kesler was announced as a Canucks alternate captain with Willie Mitchell and Mattias Öhlund, while Canucks goaltender Roberto Luongo was named captain. While he at first continued to play on the third line in a largely defensive role with Burrows, head coach Alain Vigneault eventually split the duo in the midst of a poor January for the team. As a result, Kesler was placed on the second line with free agent acquisitions Pavol Demitra and Mats Sundin. Playing in a more offensive role, he set then-personal bests for the 2008–09 season, with 26 goals and 33 assists for 59 points in all 82 contests played as the Canucks returned to the playoffs, finishing third in the West. As a result of his breakout season, he was awarded the Cyclone Taylor Award as team MVP ahead of higher-profile teammates Luongo and Henrik and Daniel Sedin. Kesler gained additional recognition on a league-wide basis as a Frank J. Selke Trophy finalist along with Pavel Datsyuk of the Detroit Red Wings and Mike Richards of the Philadelphia Flyers. He finished as second runner-up with one first-place vote. In the 2009 playoffs, Kesler would record two goals and assists for four points in all 10 games as the Canucks went on to sweep the St. Louis Blues in round one before getting defeated in the second round in six games by the Chicago Blackhawks.

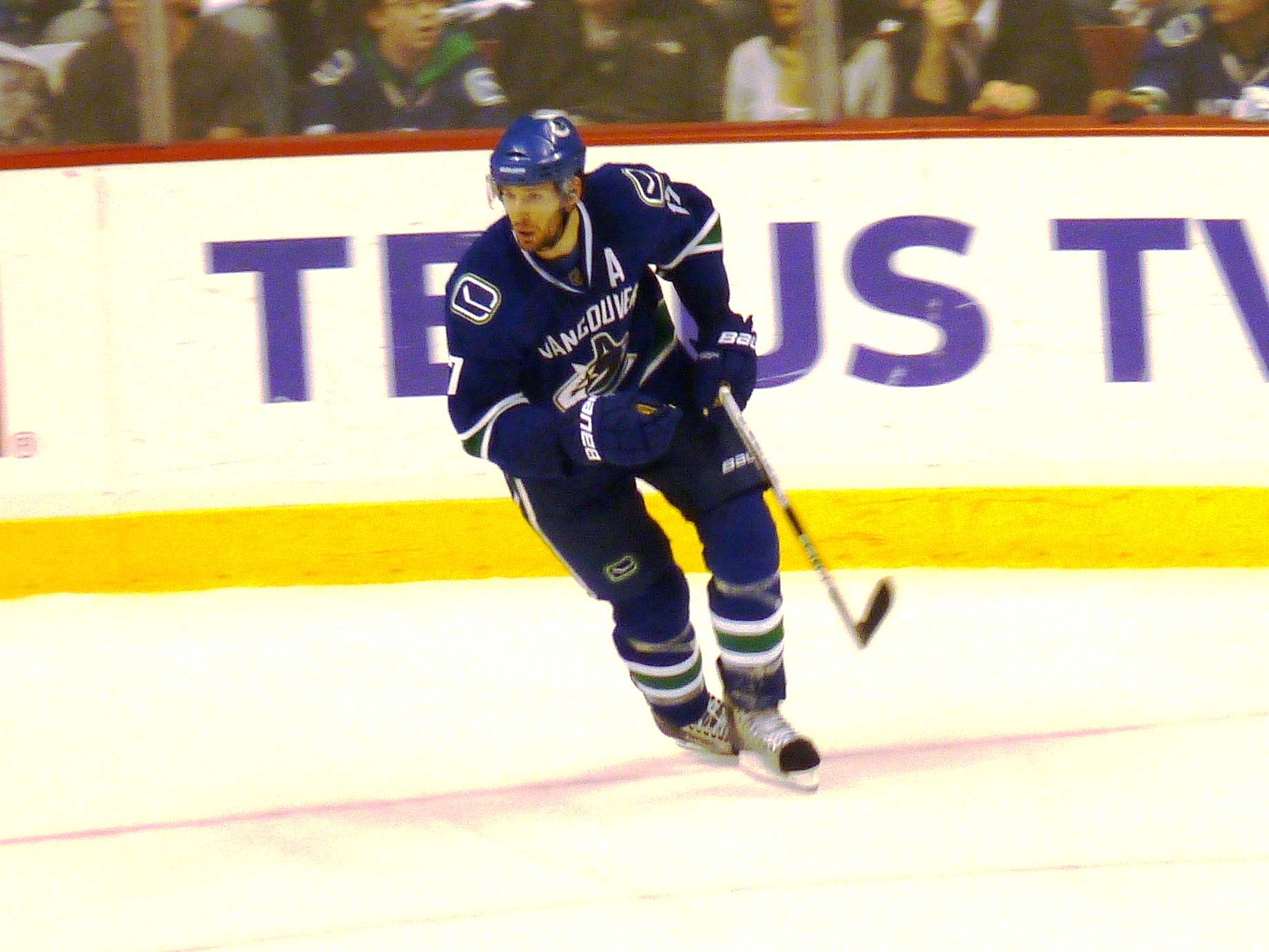
Kesler in April 2010 during the first round of the 2010 Stanley Cup playoffs

In the midst of another career year, Kesler signed a six-year, $30 million contract extension with the Canucks on March 19, 2010. The deal was structured to pay Kesler $5 million per season and came a month and a half after general manager Mike Gillis announced he had suspended contract negotiations with all the Canucks' pending free agents until after the 2009–10 season. The Canucks were reportedly looking to sign him at $4.5 million per year while Kesler was asking for $5.5 million. Kesler had made remarks the previous season in March 2009, after Burrows had recently signed a four-year, $2 million per season extension, that more players need to sign contracts below market value in order to develop a winning team. His comments later prompted his agent to refute the idea Kesler would not seek full market value in contract negotiations. Kesler was also contacted by National Hockey League Players' Association director of affairs Glenn Healy, who discouraged Kesler from making similar remarks in the future. Kesler completed the 2009–10 campaign with a new personal best in points for the third consecutive season with 75 points (25 goals and 50 assists) in all 82 games. With Mats Sundin's retirement in the 2009 off-season and Pavol Demitra being held out of the lineup for most of the season and playing only 28 games in the season due to injury, Kesler was moved to his natural center position and joined by wingers Mason Raymond and newly signed free agent Mikael Samuelsson. His 26 power play points ranked second on the team to Henrik Sedin. Playing on the second power play unit, he earned many of his points controlling the puck along the half-boards. He also averaged a career-high 19:37 minutes of ice time per game, which ranked second among team forwards to Henrik Sedin. In the subsequent 2010 playoffs, Kesler notched a goal and nine assists for 10 points in all 12 games. After helping the Canucks eliminate the Los Angeles Kings in six games in the first round, he played with a sore shoulder in the second round as Vancouver was eliminated by the Chicago Blackhawks in six games for the second consecutive year. An MRI did not reveal any serious injury. He admitted following the defeat to not having played his best during the playoffs. Following the 2009–10 campaign, he was a Selke Trophy finalist for the second consecutive season, opposite Pavel Datsyuk of the Detroit Red Wings and Jordan Staal of the Pittsburgh Penguins. He ranked second in the league to Datsyuk in takeaways with 83, while blocking 73 shots and recording 95 hits. He lost the award as the first runner-up with 655 voting points, behind Datsyuk's 688.

In the 2010 off-season, goaltender Roberto Luongo resigned his team captaincy. As Canucks management waited until the beginning of the 2010–11 season to announce his replacement, Kesler was seen by media and fans as a strong candidate, alongside Henrik Sedin. Henrik was eventually named captain prior to the season-opener and Kesler retained his alternate captaincy. The 2010–11 season marked an expanded focus on Kesler's offensive role. He began the season playing on the power play with the Sedins, as part of an effort by the Canucks coaching staff of head coach Alain Vigneault along with assistant coaches Rick Bowness and Newell Brown to "load up" their first power play unit. Switching from being the primary puck-controller on the second unit, he moved to the front of the net, screening the goalie and tipping pucks in. The off-season acquisition of defensive specialist forward Manny Malhotra in free agency also liberated Kesler from a large portion of his defensive duties, such as playing against opposing team's top forwards in a shutdown role as the second line center. Kesler scored his 100th career NHL goal in a 4–2 win against the Colorado Avalanche against Avalanche' goaltender Peter Budaj on November 24, 2010. He earned his first NHL career hat-trick, scoring all three of the Canucks' goals in a 3–2 overtime win over the Columbus Blue Jackets on December 15. On January 7, 2011, he recorded a second hat-trick against the Edmonton Oilers in a 6–1 win. On January 11, Kesler was named to his first NHL All-Star Game; he was one of three Canucks along with Daniel and Henrik Sedin. Kesler was chosen to be an alternate captain alongside Washington Capitals defenseman Mike Green representing Eric Staal's team. He went without a point as Team Staal was defeated by Team Lidstrom 11–10. Prior to the Canucks' final home game of the regular season on April 7, Kesler was presented with the team's Most Exciting Player Award, as voted by the fans. Playing the Minnesota Wild that night, whom they would go on to blank 5–0, he recorded his third hat-trick of the season and third of his career, reaching the 40-goal plateau for the first time in his career. Kesler finished the season with a career-high 41 goals; he added 32 assists for 73 points over all 82 contests for the third straight season and third among Canucks scorers. His 41 goals tied Daniel Sedin for leading the team in goals and both were tied for fourth in the NHL overall trailing only behind the league leading 50 goals scored by Anaheim Ducks forward Corey Perry, the 45 goals scored by Tampa Bay Lightning forward Steven Stamkos and the 43 goals scored by Calgary Flames forward and captain Jarome Iginla, respectively. His efforts helped the Canucks to the franchise's first Presidents' Trophy. After opening the 2011 playoffs with a seven-game, first-round victory over the eighth-seeded and defending Stanley Cup champion Chicago Blackhawks, the Canucks faced the Nashville Predators in the second round. Kesler recorded five goals and six assists for 11 points, leading them past the fifth-seeded Predators in six games. He was one point short of Pavel Bure's franchise record of most points in a playoff series (Bure had 12 points in a seven-game series against the St. Louis Blues in the first round of the 1995 playoffs). Playing the San Jose Sharks in the third round, Kesler appeared to injure either his left hip or groin while pursuing opposing defenseman Dan Boyle in the series' deciding fifth game on May 24. After leaving the bench for several shifts and with the Canucks down 2–1 near the end of the game, he returned to score the game-tying goal on Sharks’ goaltender Antti Niemi, tipping a Henrik Sedin shot with 13.2 seconds remaining in regulation. The Canucks went on to win 3–2 in double-overtime against the second-seeded Sharks with Kevin Bieksa scoring the game and series winner on Niemi, advancing to the Stanley Cup Finals. Having suffered a torn labrum on the play, Kesler required cortisone shots to continue playing for the remainder of the playoffs (his injury was not revealed until the off-season, however). Prior to the Finals, he was believed by many in the media to be a leading candidate for the Conn Smythe Trophy as the playoff MVP if the Canucks were to win the Cup. Consequently, Kesler's performance (and the Canucks as a whole) diminished in the Finals. Playing the Boston Bruins, the Canucks lost the series in seven games, one win short from winning the Stanley Cup and surrendering a 3–2 series lead in the process. After recording an assist on the game-winning goal by Raffi Torres in Game 1 on June 1, he failed to register any points in the remaining six games, while also recording a –7 rating while the Canucks as a team only scored eight goals within the whole series while the third-seeded Bruins as a team recorded 23 total goals within the series. With 19 points (seven goals and 12 assists) in all 25 games played, he ranked third among Canucks scorers (behind the Sedins) and tied for sixth among the NHL overall. On June 22, a week after the Canucks' Game 7 loss in the Finals, Kesler was awarded the Selke Trophy after finishing as a runner-up the previous two years. He received 1,179 voting points in comparison to runners-up Jonathan Toews' 476 and Pavel Datsyuk's 348. (Note: Kesler received 105 of 125 first-place ballots, while also earning 14 second-place, 5 third-place and 2 fourth-place ballots.) Kesler was also ranked eighth in Hart Memorial Trophy voting as the league's most valuable player. (Note: He received one first-place, three second-place, four third-place, five fourth-place and three fifth-place votes out of 125 ballots.)

In the 2011 off-season, Kesler underwent arthroscopic surgery for the torn labrum in his hip. Unrelated to his labrum tear in January 2007, he had adopted a program to recuperate from the injury naturally until a specialist advised him to have surgery in late July 2011. The Canucks announced on August 2, 2011 that he would not be ready to play until mid-October. On schedule, he returned to the lineup on October 18 against the New York Rangers after missing the first five games of the 2011–12 season. On November 23, Kesler played his 500th NHL game in a 3–0 shutout win over the Colorado Avalanche and recorded a goal in that game on Avalanche' goaltender Semyon Varlamov. Appearing in the final 77 contests, Kesler recorded his lowest scoring total in four years with 22 goals, 27 assists and 49 points while continuing his role as the teams second line center alongside Chris Higgins and newcomer David Booth, which became known as the "American Express" line due to all three players being American born. On a team basis, the Canucks remained a successful regular season team, winning their second consecutive Presidents' Trophy and second in franchise history altogether. However, the team would sputter in the 2012 playoffs due to fatigue from their long playoff run the year prior, losing in the first round to the eventual champions Los Angeles Kings in five games. Kesler was goalless and recorded three assists for three points in all five games played in the series against the eighth-seeded Kings.

Shortly after the Canucks were eliminated from the 2012 playoffs, it was revealed Kesler had been playing with a torn labrum in his shoulder since February 9, 2012, in a 5–2 win over the Minnesota Wild and he underwent surgery for the injury on May 8. Initially expected to have recovered by mid-November, his rehabilitation was extended for several months due to an additional wrist injury which he received surgery for in late-June. As a result, he made his 2012–13 season debut on February 15, 2013, in a 4–3 loss to the Dallas Stars. Due to the lockout, which cancelled the first three months of the season, Kesler only missed 12 games. However, within seven games, Kesler was back on the injured reserve with a broken foot. He initially sustained the injury in his first game against the Stars, but subsequent X-rays came back negative. After playing through the pain for several games, an additional CT scan revealed the fracture. Despite Kesler's injury-troubles, the Canucks as a team remained a consistent playoff contender after having finished the lockout-shortened season as the third seed in the Western Conference. After playing just 17 games in the 48 game-shortened season with four goals and nine assists for 13 points, Kesler also played all four playoff games in the 2013 playoffs recording two goals (both of which came in game two) and no assists for two points as the Canucks were swept in the first round against the sixth-seeded San Jose Sharks.

The 2013–14 season would see a major overhaul within the Canucks organization with coaching and management and the Canucks would miss the playoffs for the first time since 2008, coming eight points out of a playoff spot and the new coaching staff getting sacked after just one season. On November 22, 2013, Kesler recorded his 200th career assist on a goal by Henrik Sedin in a 6–2 win over the Columbus Blue Jackets. On February 15, 2014, during a game against Russia in the 2014 Winter Olympics, Kesler suffered what appeared to be a broken hand after blocking a shot from Russia's Ilya Kovalchuk. He was able to finish the game as USA won the game 3–2 in a shootout and would play through the rest of the tournament before the United States men's team lost in the Bronze Medal game against Finland. Despite being able to finish the tournament, Kesler did not play in the Canucks first game post-Olympic break against the St. Louis Blues due to this injury but was able to return to the lineup the following game the following day against the Minnesota Wild. On March 12, in a 3–2 shootout win over the Winnipeg Jets, Kesler suffered what appeared to be a knee injury after a knee-on-knee collision with Jets' forward Jim Slater causing him to miss the next four games. Kesler eventually finished the season with 25 goals and 18 assists for 43 points in 77 games played with his 25 goals leading the team.

==== Anaheim Ducks (2014–2020) ====
On June 27, 2014, Kesler was traded to the Anaheim Ducks, along with a third round pick in the 2015 NHL entry draft, in exchange for Nick Bonino, Luca Sbisa and a first- and third-round pick in the 2014 NHL entry draft. On March 18, 2015, Kesler scored his 200th career goal in a 3–2 win over the Los Angeles Kings on Kings' goaltender Jonathan Quick. After finishing the 2014–15 season with 47 points (20 goals, 27 assists) in 81 games played and the Ducks as the top seed of the Western Conference, Kesler would help lead the Ducks in the 2015 playoffs to their first appearance in the Western Conference Finals since 2007, where the Ducks would be upset by the eventual Stanley Cup champion Chicago Blackhawks in seven games, one win short from the Stanley Cup Finals, unable to hold onto a 3–2 series lead the team initially built for themselves.

On July 15, 2015, Kesler signed a six-year contract extension worth $41.25 million. On October 8, Kesler was named an alternate captain of the Ducks. Kesler placed third in Selke Trophy voting in the 2015–16 season behind Los Angeles Kings center Anze Kopitar and Boston Bruins center Patrice Bergeron after completing the season with 53 points recorded (21 goals, 32 assists) in 79 games. Kesler also recorded four goals and points with no assists in all seven playoff games as the Ducks would get defeated in the opening round of the 2016 playoffs in seven games by the Nashville Predators, despite initially having a 3–2 series lead.

On January 1, 2017, Kesler recorded his fourth career hat-trick in a 4–3 SO win over the Philadelphia Flyers. On March 24, Kesler recorded his 300th career assist on a goal by Andrew Cogliano in 3–1 win over the Winnipeg Jets. After putting up 22 goals and 36 assists for 58 points in all 82 games in 2016–17, Kesler would help lead the Ducks to another lengthy playoff run in the 2017 playoffs, where the Ducks would lose in six games to the Nashville Predators in the Western Conference Finals, while finishing second in the Selke Trophy race behind Boston Bruins center Patrice Bergeron and earning his second All-Star appearance. He ended the 2017 playoffs with one goal and seven assists for eight points in all 17 games.

After missing the first 37 games of the 2017–18 season due to hip surgery in the 2017 off-season, Kesler made his season debut on December 27, 2017, in a 4–1 loss to the Vegas Golden Knights. Kesler finished the season playing in 44 games with eight goals and six assists for 14 points followed by a goalless performance with two assists and points in all four playoff games in the 2018 playoffs, where the Ducks would get swept in the first round by the San Jose Sharks.

On March 5, 2019, Kesler played his 1,000th NHL game, against the Arizona Coyotes, becoming the 333rd player in NHL history to do so. Kesler ended the 2018–19 season playing in 60 games with five goals and a career low in assists (three) for eight points as the Ducks missed the playoffs for the first time since 2012 and the first time in Kesler's tenure with the Ducks.

In May 2019, Kesler underwent hip resurfacing surgery and missed the entire 2019–20 season. In the fall of 2019, shortly into the season, Kesler was also diagnosed with Crohn's disease.

He also sat out both the 2020–21 and 2021–22 seasons. At the advent of the 2021–22 season, Kesler declared he would not play in the NHL again. On March 21, 2022, the remainder of Kesler's NHL contract was traded to the Vegas Golden Knights along with John Moore as part of a deal that saw Evgenii Dadonov and a conditional second-round pick in the 2023 or 2024 draft go to Anaheim. However, the trade went into dispute due to Dadonov's no-trade clause. On March 23, the NHL officially cancelled the trade.

== International play ==
Medal record

Ice hockey

Representing United States

Olympic Games
Silver medal – second place	2010 Vancouver	

World Junior Championships
Gold medal – first place	2004 Helsinki	

World U18 Championships
Gold medal – first place	2002 Piešťany	

Throughout his career, Kesler has represented the United States at various international ice hockey tournaments. He first competed internationally at the 2001 World U-17 Hockey Challenge in New Glasgow and Truro, Nova Scotia, where he helped the American team to a gold medal victory over Team Canada Pacific, finishing the tournament with one goal and five assists in six games.

Kesler participated in his first International Ice Hockey Federation-sanctioned event at the 2002 IIHF World U18 Championships in Piešťany and Trnava, Slovakia. He finished the tournament with seven points in eight games, including two goals in a 10–3 defeat over Canada in the final round. The Americans won their first U18 title, with Kesler being awarded the Best Player Award for the tournament. Later that year, Kesler was named to the United States national junior team for the 2003 World Junior Ice Hockey Championships in Halifax and Sydney, Nova Scotia. He finished the tournament second in team scoring behind Zach Parise with seven points in seven games as the United States lost 3–2 to Finland in the bronze medal game. During the tournament, Kesler was twice named the United States' player of the game: in their quarter-final game versus the Czech Republic and in the bronze medal game versus Finland.

In December 2003, Kesler was released by the Vancouver Canucks to play in the 2004 World Junior Ice Hockey Championships, Kesler's second World Junior tournament. Kesler scored two goals as the Americans went a perfect 4–0 to win Pool A and advance to the semi-finals. There they defeated Finland 2–1, the team that had defeated them in the previous year's bronze medal game, to advance to the gold medal game versus Canada. In the gold medal game, Kesler scored the game-tying goal 6:58 into the third period to even the score at 3–3. After Canadian goaltender Marc-André Fleury cleared the puck off of teammate Braydon Coburn and into his own net, the Americans took the lead 4–3 and went on to win their first IIHF World U20 Championship in the tournament's history. Kesler's play in the tournament was praised as he often took critical faceoffs and played on the Americans' most offensive line despite suffering a facial injury early in the tournament.

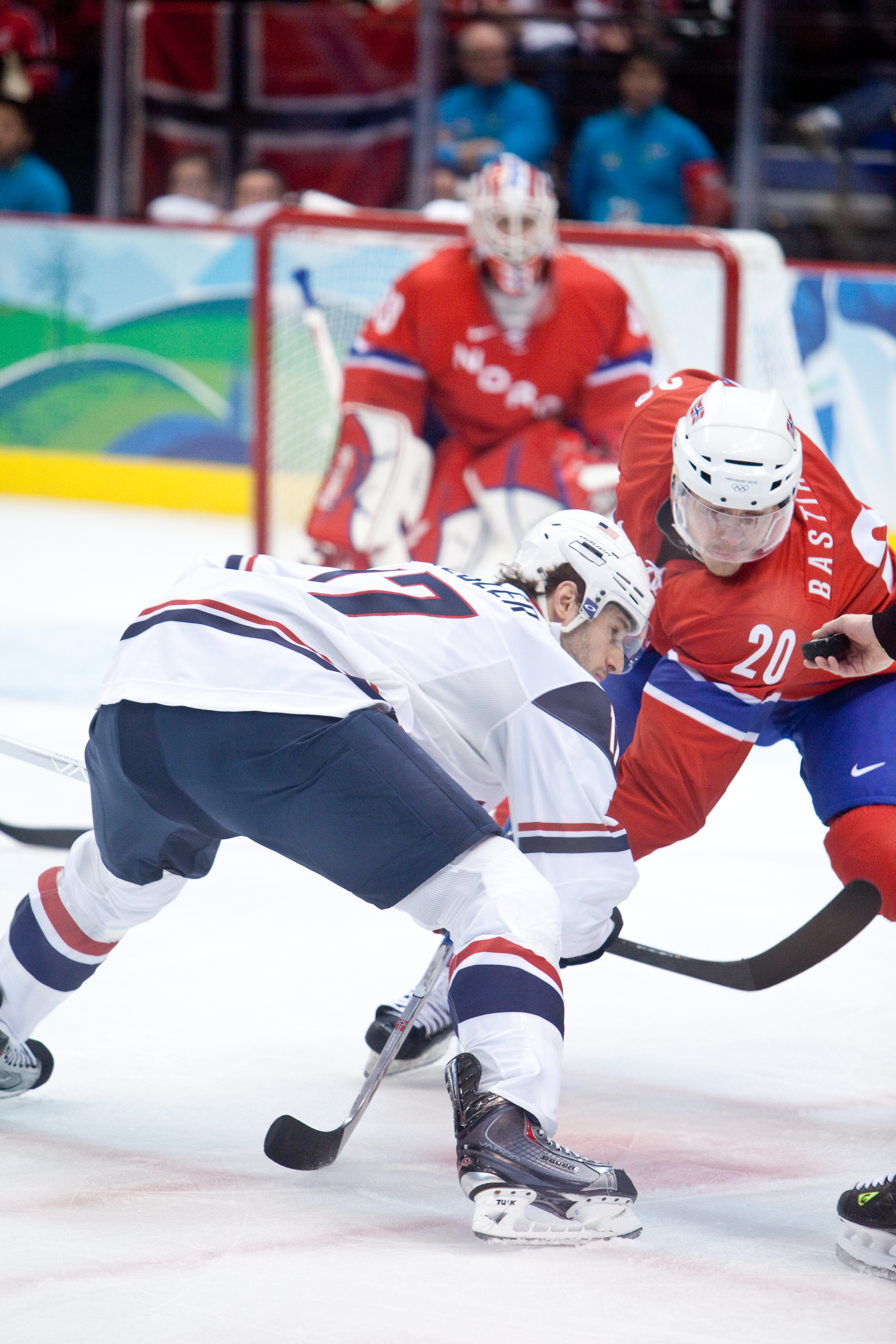
Kesler with the U.S. men's national hockey team, taking a face-off during the 2010 Winter Olympics

Kesler was named to the orientation camp for the American team at the 2006 Winter Olympics in Turin held on September 5–8, 2005, in Colorado Springs, Colorado at World Arena. Kesler, one of the youngest players at the camp, did not make the final roster for the Games. Rather, Kesler made his national men's team debut three months after the Olympics at the 2006 IIHF World Championship in Riga, Latvia. Kesler finished the tournament with one point in seven games, assisting on a Yan Stastny goal in the United States' 3–0 victory versus Denmark. He was named the United States' player of the game in their 6–0 quarter-final loss against Sweden.

Having developed into a top defensive forward in recent seasons, Kesler was an early candidate to be selected to the American team for the 2010 Winter Olympics in Vancouver, at the time the city in which he played his NHL hockey. The United States played hosts Canada in the final game of the preliminary round to determine top spot in the pool. With United States up by a goal in the final minute, Kesler dove past opposing forward Corey Perry to score an empty-netter and secure the 5–3 win. In a rematch between the two teams during the gold medal game, Canada initially had held a 2–0 lead, but Kesler scored in the second period on a deflection from Patrick Kane to cut the deficit to 2–1, followed by Zach Parise's game-tying goal with 24 seconds left in the third period to send the game into overtime. The United States ultimately lost by a score of 3–2 in overtime on Sidney Crosby's game-winning goal, so Kesler and his teammates settled for the silver medal.

Kesler was also a part of the U.S. men's national team for the 2014 Winter Olympics, where they finished fourth. On February 15, 2014, during a game against Russia, Kesler suffered what appeared to be a broken hand after blocking a shot from Russia's Ilya Kovalchuk. He was able to finish the game as USA won the game 3–2 in a shootout and would play through the rest of the tournament before the United States lost in the Bronze Metal game against Finland.

== Playing style ==
Kesler is known as a two-way forward, capable of contributing both offensively and defensively. In his first few years in the NHL, he established his role as a shutdown forward, playing on the penalty kill and against opposing teams' top players. He also earned a reputation as an agitator, trash-talking and engaging opponents physically in between play. During the 2008–09 season, Kesler began adding a more offensive component to his game and was moved up to the Canucks' second line from third. With an increased points total, he earned league recognition with his first Selke Trophy nomination as the NHL's best defensive forward. He has since continued to improve his offensive skills while remaining defensively responsible.

Among his most prevalent skills are his speed and wrist shot, the latter of which has improved alongside his recent years of increased offensive production. He is also proficient at taking faceoffs. On the penalty kill, he is an efficient shot blocker, using his body to get in the way of pucks. While competing on the powerplay, he often uses his size and strength to maintain position in front of the opposing net to either screen the goaltender or deflect shots.

Kesler's success as a player has been attributed to his competitiveness and desire to outwork opposing players. Kesler has recognized, however, that his competitive drive has often caused him to lose his composure. In the 2010 off-season, Canucks management encouraged him to play with more focus, maintaining his emotions and decreasing physical and verbal confrontation with opposing players. During the subsequent 2010–11 campaign, he gained media attention for changing his play accordingly while enjoying the best season of his career. Kesler has also credited the change with his role as a father, wanting to set a mature example for his children when they watch him play.

== Personal life ==
Kesler and his wife Andrea have four children. The family resides in Huntington Beach, California, during the season. In the off-season, they live in Bloomfield, Michigan. His family's previous offseason residence was nearby, in his hometown of Livonia, Michigan. As of 2009, he kept a Ford Mustang at his parents' home in Livonia, which he enjoyed racing.

=== Criminal charges ===
On October 27, 2025, Kesler was charged in Oakland County, Michigan, with two misdemeanor counts of criminal sexual conduct in the fourth degree stemming from events that transpired on January 1, 2025; he was arraigned in Bloomfield Hills, Michigan, and entered a not guilty plea. Both counts allege that Kesler was engaged in contact with a 16-year-old child. The acts were "through force or coercion and/or" Kesler "(had) reason to know the victim was physically helpless." As a result of the charges, Kesler was suspended from his role as a youth hockey coach by both the Michigan Amateur Hockey Association and USA Hockey. The accuser, a friend of Kesler's oldest daughter, alleged they awoke to Kesler rubbing his foot on her crotch and his erect penis touching her foot; Kesler's legal counsel disputed the accuser's testimony, arguing the case should not go to trial based on inconsistencies in the accuser's story as it was relayed to police. On December 4, a district judge determined the case would go to trial to Oakland County Circuit Court after the prosecution successfully established probable cause.

== Endorsements ==
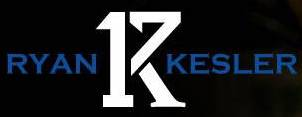
In November 2010, Kesler released a sportswear and clothing line named RK17

In March 2010, Kesler was announced as the cover athlete for the 2K Sports video game NHL 2K11, released a few months later in August 2010. He had previously worked with 2K Sports, doing motion capture for NHL 2K10.

In November 2010, Kesler released his own line of sportswear and casual clothing. In partnership with Vancouver-based Firstar Sports, the line was branded "RK17". A promotional photograph of Kesler modeling athletic underwear received considerable media attention in Vancouver and resulted in him being featured in ESPN's Body Issue magazine and named in a feature entitled "Most Beautiful People of B.C." by a local publication.

== Career statistics ==
=== Regular season and playoffs ===
			Regular season					Playoffs
Season	Team	League	GP	G	A	Pts	PIM	GP	G	A	Pts	PIM
1999–2000	Detroit Honeybaked	MWEHL	72	44	73	117	—	—	—	—	—	—
2000–01	US NTDP U18	USDP	26	8	20	28	24	—	—	—	—	—
2000–01	US NTDP U18	NAHL	56	7	21	28	40	—	—	—	—	—
2001–02	US NTDP U18	USDP	46	11	33	44	23	—	—	—	—	—
2001–02	US NTDP Juniors	USHL	13	5	5	10	10	—	—	—	—	—
2001–02	US NTDP U18	NAHL	10	5	6	11	4	—	—	—	—	—
2002–03	Ohio State Buckeyes	CCHA	40	11	20	31	44	—	—	—	—	—
2003–04	Manitoba Moose	AHL	33	3	8	11	29	—	—	—	—	—
2003–04	Vancouver Canucks	NHL	28	2	3	5	16	—	—	—	—	—
2004–05	Manitoba Moose	AHL	78	30	27	57	105	14	4	5	9	8
2005–06	Vancouver Canucks	NHL	82	10	13	23	79	—	—	—	—	—
2006–07	Vancouver Canucks	NHL	48	6	10	16	40	1	0	0	0	0
2007–08	Vancouver Canucks	NHL	80	21	16	37	79	—	—	—	—	—
2008–09	Vancouver Canucks	NHL	82	26	33	59	61	10	2	2	4	14
2009–10	Vancouver Canucks	NHL	82	25	50	75	104	12	1	9	10	4
2010–11	Vancouver Canucks	NHL	82	41	32	73	66	25	7	12	19	47
2011–12	Vancouver Canucks	NHL	77	22	27	49	56	5	0	3	3	6
2012–13	Vancouver Canucks	NHL	17	4	9	13	12	4	2	0	2	0
2013–14	Vancouver Canucks	NHL	77	25	18	43	81	—	—	—	—	—
2014–15	Anaheim Ducks	NHL	81	20	27	47	75	16	7	6	13	24
2015–16	Anaheim Ducks	NHL	79	21	32	53	78	7	4	0	4	0
2016–17	Anaheim Ducks	NHL	82	22	36	58	83	17	1	7	8	32
2017–18	Anaheim Ducks	NHL	44	8	6	14	46	4	0	2	2	6
2018–19	Anaheim Ducks	NHL	60	5	3	8	44	—	—	—	—	—
NHL totals			1,001	258	315	573	920	101	24	41	65	133

=== International ===
Year	Team	Event	Result	GP	G	A	Pts	PIM
2002	United States	WJC18	1st place, gold medalist(s)	8	2	5	7	4
2003	United States	WJC	4th	7	3	4	7	6
2004	United States	WJC	1st place, gold medalist(s)	6	3	0	3	6
2006	United States	WC	7th	7	0	1	1	0
2010	United States	OG	2nd place, silver medalist(s)	6	2	0	2	2
2014	United States	OG	4th	6	1	3	4	0
2016	United States	WCH	7th	3	0	0	0	4
Junior totals				21	8	9	17	16
Senior totals				22	3	4	7	6

== Awards ==
=== International awards ===
Award	Year
Best Player Award (IIHF World U18 Championships)	2002

=== League awards ===
Award	Year
CCHA All-Rookie Team Honorable Mention	2003
AHL All-Star Game	2005
NHL All-Star Game	2011, 2017
Frank J. Selke Trophy	2011
NHL 2K cover athlete	2011, 2014

=== Team awards ===
Award	Year
George Burke Most Valuable Freshman (Ohio State Buckeyes)	2003
Most valuable player (Manitoba Moose)	2005
Cyclone Taylor Award (Vancouver Canucks' MVP)	2009
Most Exciting Player Award (Vancouver Canucks)	2011

== Notes ==
Awards and achievements
Preceded by R. J. Umberger	Vancouver Canucks first round picks 2003	Succeeded by Cory Schneider
Preceded by Pavel Datsyuk	Frank J. Selke Trophy winner 2011	Succeeded by Patrice Bergeron
