= 2K3 =

2K3 may refer to:

- the year 2003
- NBA 2K3, 2002 video game
- NCAA College Basketball 2K3, 2002 video game
- NCAA College Football 2K3, 2002 video game
- NFL 2K3, 2002 video game
- NHL 2K3, 2002 video game
- World Series Baseball 2K3, 2003 video game
