= NHL 2K (2014 video game) =

- Developers: Virtuos; Visual Concepts; 2K China
- Publisher: 2K
- Series: NHL 2K
- Platforms: iOS, Android
- Release: October 23, 2014
- Genre: Sports (ice hockey)
- Modes: Single-player, multiplayer

NHL 2K was an ice hockey video game, developed by Virtuos in association with Visual Concepts and published by 2K. The game was released on October 23, 2014. It is the final game in the NHL 2K series and the first since 2010's NHL 2K11.

Announced on September 17, 2014, NHL 2K is the first in the series released exclusively on mobile. Chris Snyder, vice president of marketing at 2K Sports, viewed the brand revival on those platforms as building on the success seen by NHL 2K11's mobile release, while simultaneously targeting an underserved market. He confirmed that there are currently no plans to release new NHL 2K games on home consoles.

NHL 2K was taken off of the App Store and Google Play in mid-2016 after two years on the market.

== Game icon ==
Anaheim Ducks forward Ryan Kesler is the cover athlete for NHL 2K. He was also on the cover of NHL 2K11, and was described as a friend of the brand that helped out with development.

== Features ==
The game introduced an all-new "MyCareer" mode, similar to that found in the NBA 2K series. Additionally, the game also features returning modes like Season, Free skate, Shootout, Winter Classic and Three-on-three minigames. Support for live roster updates, controllers, GameCenter connectivity and iCloud also exist.

== Reception ==
The iOS version received "mixed" reviews according to the review aggregation website Metacritic, which listed an aggregate score for the game of 60 out of 100.

== See also ==
- NHL 15, another ice hockey video game, developed by EA Sports, released on the PlayStation 4, Xbox One, PlayStation 3 and Xbox 360
