= NHL 2K8 =

2007 video game

- The cover of NHL 2K8 featuring the Ottawa Senators' Jason Spezza.
- Developers: Kush Games, Visual Concepts
- Publisher: 2K
- Series: NHL 2K
- Platforms: PlayStation 2, PlayStation 3, Xbox 360
- Release: NA: September 10, 2007; AU: October 31, 2007; EU: November 2, 2007; AU: November 2, 2007 (X360)
- Genre: Sports

NHL 2K8 is an ice hockey video game made by 2K, and published on the PlayStation 2, PlayStation 3, and Xbox 360 consoles. It features former Ottawa Senators centre Jason Spezza on its cover. Bob Cole and Harry Neale return from NHL 2K6 and NHL 2K7 to provide commentary.

New features in the game include an all-new faceoff system, an all-new ProStick system involving the right skill stick to deke, take faceoffs and puck handle, and an all-new system called Superstar Combo moves, which mimics real-life dekes and fakes by actual NHL players to use in the game with the push of a button. Also, the game included an all-new goaltending system, with all-new graphics and movement.

NHL 2K8 introduced the new Reebok Edge jerseys through the use of a code found on the 2K Sports website.

The soundtrack has 16 rock songs from various artists including Priestess, Comeback Kid, Stellastarr, and other rock bands.

== Reception ==
Reception

Aggregate score
Aggregator	Score		
Aggregator	PS2	PS3	Xbox 360
Metacritic	67/100	74/100	71/100

Review scores
Publication	Score		
Publication	PS2	PS3	Xbox 360
1Up.com	N/A	N/A	D+
Electronic Gaming Monthly	N/A	N/A	5/10
Game Informer	N/A	7.75/10	7.75/10
GamePro	N/A	N/A	3.75/5
GameRevolution	N/A	C−	C−
GameSpot	6.5/10	7/10	7/10
GameSpy	N/A	3.5/5	3.5/5
GameZone	N/A	8.5/10	N/A
IGN	6.5/10	8/10	8.5/10
Official Xbox Magazine (US)	N/A	N/A	8/10
PlayStation: The Official Magazine	N/A	8/10	N/A

The game received "average" reviews on all platforms according to the review aggregation website Metacritic.

== See also ==
- NHL 2K

Preceded by NHL 2K7	NHL 2K8; 2007	Succeeded by NHL 2K9
