= 2K10 =

2K10 may refer to:

- the year 2010
- Major League Baseball 2K10, 2010 video game
- NBA 2K10, 2009 video game
- NHL 2K10, 2009 video game
- Y2K+10, a nickname for the Year 2010 problem in computing
