= 2K9 =

2K9 may refer to:

- the year 2009
- Major League Baseball 2K9, 2009 video game
- NBA 2K9, 2008 video game
- NHL 2K9, 2008 video game
