= College Hoops 2K7 =

2006 basketball video game

- Cover art for the Xbox 360 version
- Developer: Visual Concepts
- Publisher: 2K
- Platforms: Xbox, Xbox 360, PlayStation 2, PlayStation 3
- Release: Xbox & Xbox 360: NA: November 20, 2006; PlayStation 2: NA: December 11, 2006; PlayStation 3: NA: March 14, 2007
- Genre: Sports
- Modes: Single-player, multiplayer

College Hoops 2K7 is an American college basketball video game initially released on November 22, 2006 for the Xbox and Xbox 360 and released later for the PlayStation 2 (December 11) and PlayStation 3 (March 14, 2007). It is the 5th installment of the series, which began with NCAA College Basketball 2K3. It features former Duke JJ Redick on the cover. It is produced by 2K Sports. It is the first college basketball game for the PlayStation 3. Redick was a special correspondent to the development of the game and added his signature shot style in motion capture.

Every school competing in Division I NCAA College Basketball is included in 2K7, including D-1 transitional independents (such as New Jersey Institute of Technology). The game also features the ability to change and modify rosters.

Coaches Roy Williams, Lute Olson, Billy Donovan, John Calipari, Jay Wright, and Sidney Lowe lend their likenesses to the game. There is a preview show with hosts Greg Gumbel and Clark Kellogg.

== Features ==
- 325 Division 1 Teams
- Enhanced Legacy Mode has updated selection Sunday, and over 31 In-season tournaments
- Over 200 authentic collegiate Fight songs
- Precision Passing has new animations and upgraded passing intelligence

== Reception ==
Reception

Aggregate scores
Aggregator	Score
GameRankings	(X360) 82.48% (PS3) 81.13% (Xbox) 73.17% (PS2) 68.40%
Metacritic	(X360) 82/100 (PS3) 81/100 (Xbox) 73/100 (PS2) 69/100

Review scores
Publication	Score
Game Informer	8/10
GamePro	4.5/5
GameSpot	(PS3) 8/10 (X360) 7.9/10; 7/10
GameTrailers	8.3/10
GameZone	8.6/10
IGN	(PS3) 8.3/10 (X360) 8.2/10 (Xbox) 7.4/10 (PS2) 7.3/10
Official U.S. PlayStation Magazine	6.5/10
Official Xbox Magazine (US)	(X360) 9/10 (Xbox) 8/10
PlayStation: The Official Magazine	7/10
X-Play	4/5
Detroit Free Press	3/4

The game was met with positive to average reception. GameRankings and Metacritic gave it a score of 82.48% and 82 out of 100 for the Xbox 360 version; 81.13% and 81 out of 100 for the PlayStation 3 version; 73.17% and 73 out of 100 for the Xbox version; and 68.40% and 69 out of 100 for the PlayStation 2 version.
