= Dominus (video game) =

1994 real-time strategy video game

- Developer: Visual Concepts
- Publisher: U.S. Gold
- Platform: MS-DOS
- Release: 1994
- Genre: Real-time strategy

Dominus is a real-time strategy video game developed by Visual Concepts and released for MS-DOS in 1994. A Sega Genesis version was planned but never released.

== Gameplay ==
The game takes place in a medieval fantasy world. The player controls a king who must defend his kingdom from several invading kingdoms, all of whom are attacking simultaneously from different directions. The invaders start moving in from the outlying villages, into the castle walls, and finally entering the keep itself. The player defends the kingdom by laying traps, casting spells, deploying monsters to fight, and flying into the battlefield to allow the player to fight directly (as the king).

The game features strategic elements which are not often found in real time strategy games, such as setting monsters to the task of collecting spell and trap ingredients, and interrogating prisoners.

== Reception ==
Reception

Review scores
Publication	Score
Computer Gaming World	3/5
PC Gamer (US)	75%

Dominus won Electronic Entertainment's 1994 "Best Strategy Game" award. The editors wrote that the game "delivers great game play, no matter which way you choose to play."
