= Lester the Unlikely =

1994 video game

- North American cover art by Michel Bohbot
- Developer: Visual Concepts
- Publishers: DTMC; Asmik Ace (Japan)
- Designer: Jeffrey J. Thomas
- Programmer: Brian Greenstone
- Composers: Byte-Size Sound: Matt Scott; Mike Cihak
- Platform: Super Nintendo Entertainment System
- Release: NA: January 1994; JP: September 16, 1994
- Genre: Platform action game
- Mode: Single-player

Lester the Unlikely (Note: Known in Japan as Odekake Lester: Lelele no Le (^^; (おでかけレスターれれれのれ(^^;; Odekake Resutā: Rerere no Re (^^;).) is a 1994 platform video game developed by Visual Concepts for the Super Nintendo Entertainment System (SNES).

== Gameplay ==
The game has a unique engine in which the protagonist, Lester, is easily frightened early in the game and will act reluctantly when faced with animals, heights, etc. For instance, when the player guides Lester towards a turtle in the first stage, he will at first scream and run in the opposite direction; when the player makes him walk towards it a second time he will slowly creep towards it. This coincides with one of the major themes of the game being Lester facing his fears, and these instances happen less and less as the game goes on. The game also has an item and weapon box, allowing Lester to hold both of these things. The first part of the game depicts Lester as a very cowardly character. Every time he encounters a new creature, he runs away in the opposite direction with a scream (temporarily removing the controls from the player's hand). Upon approaching the creature a second time, Lester walks slowly, protecting himself with his arms. Once a certain type of creature has been defeated, the player will be able to walk to this type of creature without any further sign of fear. At the beginning of the game, Lester walks in a very lazy, laid-back stance, suggesting weakness and lack of courage. However, after saving an indigenous girl from a huge gorilla, the girl gives a kiss to the hero and he is suddenly changed. In the following levels, Lester has a very upright and courageous stance.

== Plot ==
It begins with a "geeky" teenage boy named Lester who is reading the latest issue of the Super Duper Hero Squad comic book at a dock. He falls asleep at a cargo crate and gets accidentally picked up by a cargo ship. As the ship sails off, it gets hijacked by pirates and immediately sinks. Thankfully, Lester finds a life jacket and swims to a nearby tropical island.

Arriving safely at the shore, Lester desperately tries to find help. As he timidly fights small creatures along the way such as turtles, crabs, seagulls, and bats, he finds a "Guardian Tiki" who advises him to seek Hector, the island's leader, who lives in a village beyond the haunted burial ground. Lester manages to fight his way to the village and meets Tikka, Hector's daughter, who warns him that pirates have not only taken over the island but also kidnapped Tikka's father. Lester courageously volunteers to save Hector for he is "Lester The Heroic," but Tikka doubts it as he is more "Lester The Unlikely" because of his weak physique.

Lester redeems himself after defeating a giant ape that was causing problems in the jungle. Tikka kisses Lester and it boosts his confidence and agility, to the point where he no longer exhibits his "geeky" postures and now stands and runs with a bigger stride. With Tikka's assistance, Lester makes his way to the pirate's ship and confidently defeats them with swordfights. He finally rescues Hector who praises his courage and bravery.

Back in the village, Hector rewards Lester with a seaworthy surfboard that can be used to get him out of the island. Using the giant waves created by an atomic test at nearby Bikini Atoll, Lester surfs his way back home. The ending shows Lester retelling his adventure to two beautiful women on a beach.

After the credits, the game hints at a sequel, stating "watch for Lester, he will be back!"

== Development ==
Bill Stanton was the lead artist on the project and handled backgrounds, tiles, sprites and adapting rotoscope animations. Michel Bohbot created the cover art. Eric Browning, a lead artist for Visual Concepts (as well as the voice of Lester), acted as the rotoscope model for the lead character. Browning described it as "one of those games that starts out way too ambitious, and ends up merely adequate." Lester the Unlikely was one of six SNES games programmed by Brian Greenstone of Pangea Software. On the Pangea website, Greenstone wrote "Lester was a game I never liked. Don't wanna talk about it."

A conversion for the Atari Jaguar was in development and planned to be published by DTMC, but it was never released.

== Reception ==
Reception

Review scores
Publication	Score
Famitsu	6/10, 5/10, 6/10, 7/10
Game Informer	4.25/10
Game Players	77%
GameFan	80%, 76%, 79%, 78%
Super Play	52%
Total!	4
Nintendo Game Zone	35/100
Super Action	70%
VideoGames	8/10

Lester the Unlikely received mixed reviews from critics. VideoGames celebrated Lester the Unlikely as a "bizarre, but fun twist to an over-used genre." Nintendo Power praised the game's animation, noting that they looked similar to Prince of Persia, and the difficulty. They did, however, dislike the limited number of continues for a game that would require the player to experiment a lot in order to beat it.
