= NBA Fastbreak '98 =

1997 video game

NBA Fastbreak '98 NBA Action 98
- Cover featuring the Chicago Bulls vs the Utah Jazz from the 1997 NBA Finals
- Developer: Visual Concepts
- Publishers: NA: Midway Games (PS); EU: GT Interactive (PS); WW: Sega (PC, SAT)
- Designer: Alvin Cardona
- Programmer: Aki Rimpilainen
- Composer: Mark Chosak
- Platforms: Microsoft Windows, Sega Saturn, PlayStation
- Release: NA: October 28, 1997 (PC, SAT); NA: November 21, 1997 (PS); EU: 1998 (PS, SAT)
- Genre: Sports simulation
- Mode: Single player

NBA Fastbreak '98 is a basketball simulator released for the Sony PlayStation in 1997. It takes place during the 1997-98 National Basketball Association season. It was published by Midway Games and GT Interactive. Originally announced under the title "Hardwood Heroes", the game was released with minimal changes as NBA Action 98 on Sega Saturn and Microsoft Windows, published by Sega, with Kobe Bryant of the Los Angeles Lakers as the cover athlete. Another version was being developed by Z-Axis for the Nintendo 64 under the title "NBA Fast Break 64", with a prospective November 1997 release, but it was cancelled.

== Gameplay ==
NBA FastBreak '98 uses icon passing. Players can choose from a simulation mode or a more simplified "arcade mode". Unusual for a basketball game of its time, it also has a practice mode which allows players to learn moves outside the pressures of a game.

== Reception ==
Reception

Review scores
Publication	Score		
Publication	PC	PS	Saturn
CNET Gamecenter	2/10	N/A	N/A
Computer Games Strategy Plus	3.5/5	N/A	N/A
Computer Gaming World	3/5	N/A	N/A
Electronic Gaming Monthly	N/A	6.875/10 (Note: In Electronic Gaming Monthly's review of the PlayStation version, Kraig Kujawa gave it a score of 7.5/10, Dan Hsu gave it 7/10, John Ricciardi gave it 6.5/10, and Kelly Rickards gave it 6.5/10.)	7/10
Game Informer	N/A	8/10	8.25/10
GameFan	N/A	88% (Note: In GameFan's viewpoint of the PlayStation version, one critic gave it 88, and the other 87.)	86% (Note: In GameFan's viewpoint of the Saturn version, two critics gave it each a score of 86.)
GameRevolution	B	N/A	N/A
GameSpot	7.1/10	7.1/10	6.8/10
IGN	N/A	4/10	N/A
Official U.S. PlayStation Magazine	N/A	2.5/5	N/A
PC Gamer (US)	87%	N/A	N/A
Sega Saturn Magazine	N/A	N/A	91%

Most reviews for the game ranged from middling to moderately positive. Critics overwhelmingly praised the advanced and detailed graphics, but many also noted that they come at the cost of low game speed, making the gameplay feel sluggish. The sound was also widely criticized, especially the weak crowd noises, which Jay Boor of IGN compared to a "fizzled three-inch speaker", as well as remarking upon the poor quality of the rim sounds. However, critics widely praised the controls, the practice mode, and the numerous options for customizing the game. Sega Saturn Magazine added that since the options screens are kept simple, there is no loading when making changes, which encourages using these features.

Electronic Gaming Monthly (EGM) and GameSpot's reviews for the Saturn version commented that, while not in any way spectacular, the game is solid and enjoyable and, with the Saturn having had a fairly weak lineup of basketball games, it stands as the best basketball game on the Saturn. While opining that the PlayStation version is slightly better due to its sharper graphics, EGM's review for this version was less enthusiastic, saying that the PlayStation offers superior basketball video games. Contrarily, both GamePro and Sega Saturn Magazine's reviews for the Saturn release considered it to be an excellent game even in absolute terms, with GamePro saying it "delivers with more authority than a Shaq tip-slam!" (Note: GamePro gave the Saturn version 4.0/5 for graphics, 4.0/5 for control, 3.5/5 for sound, and 4.5/5 for fun factor.) and Sega Saturn Magazine naming it their "game of the month". A different GamePro critic reviewed the PlayStation version and had a more middling response, commenting that "... FastBreak does a good job of capturing the NBA experience, but it's missing the attitude that pushes NBA Live to the top. Dunks aren't slammed with authority, players don't get shoved to the ground very often, and the game sometimes turns into a cherry-pickin' battle as long passes lead to some easy baskets." (Note: GamePro gave the PlayStation version 4.5/5 for graphics, 3.5/5 for sound, 4.0/5 for control, and 4.0/5 for fun factor.) GameSpot also had a different critic review the PlayStation version, who was more positive, calling it a "good first attempt", and commenting that while the game is not the all-around best basketball game on the market, it was strong on enough points to be a viable contender against its competition.

European reviews of the Saturn version varied considerably. French magazine Player One awarded the game 85%, praising its simulation-oriented gameplay, intuitive controls, fluid animation and extensive selection of camera angles and replay options, while considering its overall technical presentation relatively average. The reviewer concluded that it could compete with NBA Live 97, which they considered no better technically. Germany's MAN!AC gave the game 80%, describing it as a major improvement over its predecessor and praising its graphical improvements, realistic player movement, range of options and multiplayer gameplay, although it lacked some of the more elaborate graphical effects seen in competing basketball games. Italian magazine Mega Console was considerably more critical, awarding it 60%. The reviewer argued that large player models and spectacular moves did not compensate for weaknesses in the underlying gameplay structure, and also criticized its technical presentation, concluding that the Saturn still lacked a high-quality basketball simulation.

The Saturn version was nominated for the "Best Saturn Game" award at the CNET Gamecenter Awards for 1997, which went to Virtual On: Cyber Troopers. During the inaugural Interactive Achievement Awards, the PC version received a nomination for the Academy of Interactive Arts & Sciences' "PC Sports Game of the Year" award, which was ultimately given to FIFA: Road to World Cup 98.

== Legacy ==
NBA Action 98 served as an early foundation for Visual Concepts' later NBA 2K series. In a 2018 retrospective, Visual Concepts co-founder Jeff Thomas said that the game gave the studio a starting point for its future basketball titles. Several elements introduced in NBA Action 98 continued to influence NBA 2K, including the ability to call plays, a more simulation-oriented style of gameplay, and an end-to-end three-dimensional court perspective similar to the later "2K Cam". The game also impressed Sega, which subsequently acquired Visual Concepts and assigned the studio to develop sports games for the Dreamcast.
