= ESPN College Hoops =

2003 basketball video game

- Developer: Kush Games
- Publisher: Sega
- Platforms: PlayStation 2, Xbox
- Release: NA: November 11, 2003
- Genre: Sports
- Modes: Single-player, multiplayer

ESPN College Hoops (sometimes mislabeled as ESPN College Basketball 2K4) is an American college basketball video game which was initially released on November 11, 2003 for PlayStation 2 and Xbox. It is the sequel to the debut game of the series, NCAA College Basketball 2K3, and the first game in the series to feature the ESPN license. It features former Texas Longhorns and retired NBA guard T. J. Ford on the cover. On the Xbox version, multiplayer on Xbox Live was available to players until April 15, 2010. ESPN College Hoops is now playable online again on the replacement online servers called Insignia.

== Reception ==
Reception

Aggregate score
Aggregator	Score	
Aggregator	PS2	Xbox
Metacritic	83/100	80/100

Review scores
Publication	Score	
Publication	PS2	Xbox
Electronic Gaming Monthly	6.83/10 (Note: Two critics of Electronic Gaming Monthly gave the game each a score of 6.5/10, and the other gave it 7.5/10.)	6.83/10
Game Informer	8.25/10	N/A
GameRevolution	B	B
GameSpot	8/10	8.4/10
GameZone	8.5/10	8/10
IGN	8.7/10	8.7/10
Official U.S. PlayStation Magazine	3.5/5	N/A
Official Xbox Magazine (US)	N/A	8.8/10
TeamXbox	N/A	8.9/10
X-Play	N/A	3/5

The game received "favorable" reviews on both platforms according to the review aggregation website Metacritic. GamePro called it "a fine hoops title with a plentiful feature set. It's not the dominant game that its NBA brother is, but it's still very worthy of a look." (Note: GamePro gave the game two 4/5 scores for graphics and fun factor, and two 4.5/5 scores for sound and control.)
