= NHL 2K11 =

2010 video game

- Developers: Visual Concepts (Wii), 2K China (App Store)
- Publisher: 2K
- Series: NHL 2K
- Platforms: Wii, iOS
- Release: Wii & iPhone: NA: August 24, 2010; EU: October 8, 2010 (Wii); iPad: NA: February 10, 2011
- Genre: Sports (ice hockey)
- Modes: Single-player, multiplayer

NHL 2K11 is an ice hockey sports video game developed and published by Visual Concepts and 2K, respectively.

The game was announced on March 3, 2010, as a Wii-exclusive game. It was the first game in the NHL 2K series since NHL 2K7 not to be released on the PlayStation 3, the first since NHL 2K6 not to be released on the Xbox 360, the first since NHL 2K3 to not be released on the PlayStation 2, and the last game in the NHL 2K series to be released on the Wii, as the next entry in the series is released only on iOS and Android devices. Take-Two chairman Strauss Zelnick said that "As far as NHL, we're taking a year off on PS3 and Xbox 360 to refine, redesign and re-think". This was the last game for the NHL 2K series on consoles.

Then-Vancouver Canucks forward Ryan Kesler is the cover athlete for NHL 2K11.

== Features ==
The game introduced an all-new "Road to the Cup" mode, featuring Miis. The mode also includes mini-games, trivia challenges and skills competitions. NHL 2K11 also included things like broken sticks, more responsive skating, improved artificial intelligence and enhanced graphics. The Winter Classic was also added as a mode.

== Reception ==
Reception

Aggregate score
Aggregator	Score	
Aggregator	iOS	Wii
Metacritic	77/100	62/100

Review scores
Publication	Score	
Publication	iOS	Wii
1Up.com	N/A	C−
Game Informer	N/A	6/10
GameRevolution	N/A	C+
GameSpot	N/A	5.5/10
GamesRadar+	N/A	3.5/5
GameZone	N/A	6/10
IGN	7.5/10	6.5/10

The iPhone version received "generally favorable reviews", while the Wii version received "mixed" reviews, according to the review aggregation website Metacritic.

== See also ==
- NHL 11, another ice hockey video game, developed by EA Sports, released on the PlayStation 3 and Xbox 360
- NHL Slapshot, another ice hockey video game developed by EA Sports, also for the Wii console
