= Major League Baseball 2K5 =

2005 baseball video game

- North American Xbox box art, featuring Derek Jeter
- Developer: Kush Games
- Publisher: 2K
- Series: MLB 2K
- Engine: RenderWare
- Platforms: Xbox, PlayStation 2
- Release: Xbox: NA: February 23, 2005; PlayStation 2: NA: February 28, 2005; World Series Edition: NA: October 18, 2005
- Genre: Sports
- Mode: Single-player

Major League Baseball 2K5 (MLB 2K5) is an MLB licensed baseball simulation video game developed by Kush Games and published by 2K for PlayStation 2 and Xbox. The previous game in the series made by Sega Sports was ESPN Major League Baseball in 2004. The game included Web Gems instant replays, K-Zone pitching, Slam Zone hitting, and baserunner mode. The game was released in late February 2005 on the PlayStation 2 and Xbox consoles. The cover baseball player was New York Yankees shortstop Derek Jeter. Later that year, an upgraded version titled Major League Baseball 2K5: World Series Edition was released during the 2005 MLB postseason.

== Commentators ==
The commentary is delivered by the ESPN Sunday Night Baseball crew of Jon Miller and Joe Morgan. Karl Ravech introduces the games from the studio.

== Features ==
Exhibition: Play against the computer or head-to-head with another player.

Franchise: Play multiple seasons with a team.

GM Career Mode: Become a team's GM and try to accomplish certain goals given by the owner while building a good team.

Online: MLB 2K5's online mode includes both games and online leagues.

== Reception ==
=== MLB 2K5 ===
Major League Baseball 2K5

Aggregate score
Aggregator	Score	
Aggregator	PS2	Xbox
Metacritic	82/100	81/100

Review scores
Publication	Score	
Publication	PS2	Xbox
Electronic Gaming Monthly	8/10	8/10
Game Informer	8.5/10	8.5/10
GamePro	4.5/5	4.5/5
GameRevolution	B	B
GameSpot	8.4/10	8.4/10
GameSpy	4.5/5	4.5/5
GameZone	9.1/10	8.8/10
IGN	8.5/10	8.5/10
Official U.S. PlayStation Magazine	3.5/5	N/A
Official Xbox Magazine (US)	N/A	7.4/10
TeamXbox	N/A	8.8/10

The game received "favorable" reviews on both platforms according to the review aggregation website Metacritic. GameSpot said that "what sets MLB 2K5 apart from other baseball video games is how great it looks and sounds ... Major League Baseball 2K5 is a big step in the right direction for Take-Two's (formerly Sega's) video game baseball franchise. Last year's game, to be kind, was full of bugs and had modes that didn't actually work as advertised. All of the modes in this year's game work like they should and there seem to be hardly any bugs, although the few you will probably run across do have the potential to be very annoying." IGN wrote that "MLB 2K5 still has a ways to go if it intends to compete with the memory of MVP next year. The animations need a complete overhaul, the AI definitely needs a reworking, and the Franchise Mode has to see significant innovation outside of a nicer interface", but that overall "MLB 2K5 is a great experience worthy of a spot on your shelf."

=== World Series Edition ===
MLB 2K5: World Series Edition

Aggregate score
Aggregator	Score	
Aggregator	PS2	Xbox
Metacritic	86/100	88/100

Review scores
Publication	Score	
Publication	PS2	Xbox
IGN	8.8/10	8.8/10
TeamXbox	N/A	9/10

The World Series Edition received "generally favorable reviews" on both platforms, a bit higher than the original MLB 2K5, but both a few points shy of "universal acclaim", according to Metacritic. During the 9th Annual Interactive Achievement Awards, the Academy of Interactive Arts & Sciences nominated MLB 2K5: World Series Edition for "Sports Game of the Year", which was ultimately awarded to SSX On Tour.

== Exclusive license ==
In 2005, in response to EA Sports' exclusive license with the National Football League and ESPN prohibiting any NFL 2K games for the foreseeable future, Take-Two Interactive signed an exclusive third-party licensing contract with Major League Baseball (MLB), MLBPA and MLBAM to produce MLB games. The agreement, which ran from Spring 2006 to 2012, allowed for the console manufacturers Sony, Microsoft, and Nintendo to produce MLB titles for their respective platforms, but barred third party developers such as EA Sports from continuing or developing their own MLB games.
