= 2K Los Angeles =

American video game developer

- Formerly: Kush Games, Inc. (2002–2007)
- Company type: Subsidiary
- Industry: Video games
- Founded: 1998; 28 years ago
- Founder: Umrao Mayer
- Defunct: 2008
- Fate: Dissolved
- Headquarters: Camarillo, California, US
- Key people: Graeme Bayless (president)
- Parent: Visual Concepts (2004–2005); 2K (2005–2008)

2K Los Angeles (formerly Kush Games, Inc.) was an American video game developer based in Camarillo, California. Founded by Umrao Mayer in 1998, the company was part of Visual Concepts, which itself was a part of Sega. Both Kush Games and Visual Concepts were sold to Take-Two Interactive and subsequently became part of their new 2K label. Kush Games was renamed 2K Los Angeles in February 2007 before being shut down in 2008.

== History ==
Kush Games was founded by Umrao Mayer in 1998 to develop sports games. Kush Games was acquired by Sega in 2004 and became part of Visual Concepts. On January 24, 2005, Visual Concepts and Kush Games were acquired by Take-Two Interactive for US$24 million. A total of US$32.2 million had been paid to Sega for the acquisition of Visual Concepts and affiliated properties by January 2006. On January 25, 2005, the day following the acquisition, Take-Two Interactive announced their new publishing label, 2K, which would henceforth manage Visual Concepts and Kush Games.

In February 2007, Kush Games was rebranded 2K Los Angeles. By August 2007, Mayer had been succeeded as president by Graeme Bayless. Mayer, together with partner George Simmons, went on to found Zindagi Games in 2008. 2K Los Angeles was shut down that same year.

== Games developed ==
Year	Title	Platform(s)	Publisher
2002	NCAA College Basketball 2K3	GameCube, PlayStation 2, Xbox	Sega
2003	ESPN College Hoops	PlayStation 2, Xbox	Sega
2003	ESPN NHL Hockey	PlayStation 2, Xbox	Sega
2004	ESPN NHL 2K5	PlayStation 2, Xbox	Sega
2005	Major League Baseball 2K5	PlayStation 2, Xbox	2K Sports
2005	Major League Baseball 2K5: World Series Edition	PlayStation 2, Xbox	2K Sports
2005	NHL 2K6	PlayStation 2, Xbox, Xbox 360	2K Sports
2006	Major League Baseball 2K6	GameCube, PlayStation 2, PlayStation Portable, Xbox, Xbox 360	2K Sports
2006	NHL 2K7	PlayStation 2, PlayStation 3, Xbox, Xbox 360	2K Sports
2007	Major League Baseball 2K7	Game Boy Advance, Nintendo DS, PlayStation 2, PlayStation 3, PlayStation Portable, Xbox, Xbox 360	2K Sports
2007	NHL 2K8	PlayStation 2, PlayStation 3, Xbox 360	2K Sports
2008	Major League Baseball 2K8	PlayStation 2, PlayStation 3, PlayStation Portable, Wii, Xbox 360	2K Sports
