= Kiekko.tk =

2004 video game

- Website type: Online game
- Available in: Finnish, English language
- Owner: Jouko Pynnönen Mikko Pynnönen
- Website: kiekko.tk
- Registration: Optional
- Launched: 2004
- Current status: Active

Kiekko.tk is a java-based ice hockey game, which has over 31,000 registered accounts (a majority of them are Finnish). The game is developed by Jouko and Mikko Pynnönen. The game is free to play, but some features such as starting a team have to be paid for with either SMS-messages, Credit card or Phone call.

== History ==
Kiekko.tk started in the beginning of 2004 as a simple java-applet, which did not have a registration feature and only 10 players were able to play the game at the same time. Graphics were primitive; players were Smileys (also known as a "smiley version"), the puck was square, and the hockey rink's entries pretty rough. The game has been developed due to its number of active players. Next a list of the most important features:

- user registration, 08.04.2004
- saved statistics (goals and assists)
- human type characters
- exact hockey rink's dimensions and improved graphics
- creating a team, 21.04.2004
- VIP-usership and SMS system, summer 2004
- saved goal replays, October 2004
- hooking and penalties, September 2006
- experience'o'meter, August 2007
- auto-play rooms, September 2007
- revised website's outlook, October 2007
- switching arena's seat's colors, December 2007
- spectator's graphic outlook revise, December 2007
- separate ranking points for every game format (3vs3, 4vs4, 5vs5), May 2008
- optional attribute points for games and experimental rooms, October 2008
- new graphic pack, October 2011
- ranking points only from team autoplays, April 2012

== Gameplay ==
Every player takes control of one player in the rink. The player is controlled by a mouse. Goalies cannot be controlled, as they are computer controlled. To practice, players can join training rooms where players are allowed to leave the rink whenever they see fit. Players can also join a team and play team matches. Players are able to spectate these matches as well as training matches. By clicking and holding the left mouse button, the puck can be passed or shot. By clicking the right mouse button, an automatic pass is sent to a teammate closest to the cursor the moment the right mouse button is released. To increase the competition of the game, members have organised leagues.

== Rankings ==
There are four rankings in Kiekko.tk. Novice, Amateur, Pro, and Elite. Members are given these rankings based on the number of hours played. Members who have played under four hours are novices. The other rankings go as follows:

- 10% Elite
- 30% Pro
- 30% Amateur
- 30% Novice

== Moderators ==
Moderators are assigned to ensure that members behave and play the game in a decent manner. Members failing to comply with the Kiekko regulations can be muted by them. Regular members are able to report members using the following command: /report *nickname* *reason of report*

== Technology ==
- Game server, server-side code was written in C language (compiler GCC).
- Web-interface was developed with dynamic content development system called CWS, which combines the flexibility of JSP- and ASP-like tags with the power and sophisticated features of C++, supports FastCGI.
- MySQL-database
- A piece of middleware written in Perl, working as the glue between the game server and the database.
- The game Applet is written in Java and is developed with J2SE1.4.2.
