= NHL 2K (2000 video game) =

- North American box art, featuring Brendan Shanahan
- Developer: Black Box Games
- Publisher: Sega (Note: Released under the Sega Sports banner.)
- Series: NHL 2K
- Platform: Dreamcast
- Release: NA: February 9, 2000; EU: July 7, 2000
- Genre: Sports (ice hockey)
- Modes: Single-player, multiplayer

NHL 2K, alternatively known as Sega Sports NHL 2K, is a 2000 ice hockey video game developed by Black Box Games and published by Sega for the Dreamcast.

== Gameplay ==
NHL 2K is an ice hockey simulation featuring officially licensed National Hockey League teams and players. The game includes exhibition matches, tournament competitions and a season mode. Players can select their preferred teams, examine player statistics and adjust team line-ups and formations. During matches, they can also make substitutions and tactical changes. The game features multiple camera perspectives and action replays.

== Development ==
The game was in development for twelve months. The in-game play-by-play announcer was Bob Cole and the color commentator was Harry Neale.

In a June 2000 interview with GameCritics.com, producer Douglas Tronsgard explained that several members of Black Box Games had previously worked at Radical Entertainment, where they had contributed to earlier ice hockey games. The development team used professional motion-capture performers to reproduce players' movements and recorded sound effects at Vancouver's GM Place. Visual Concepts also assisted with development, providing crowd assets for the game.

According to Tronsgard, Sega brought the game's planned release forward from March to February 2000 to coincide with the NHL All-Star Game, reducing the available development time by one month. Consequently, planned features such as a career mode and player injuries were omitted as the team prioritised the core gameplay mechanics.

== Reception ==
Reception

Aggregate score
Aggregator	Score
GameRankings	76%

Review scores
Publication	Score
AllGame	2.5/5
CNET Gamecenter	6/10
Electronic Gaming Monthly	9/10 (Note: In Electronic Gaming Monthly's review of the game, one critic gave it 9.5/10, another gave it 8.5/10, and the rest gave it each a score of 9/10.)
EP Daily	8/10
Game Informer	8.25/10
GameFan	72% (Note: In GameFan's viewpoint of the game, one critic gave it 72, and the other 71.)
GameRevolution	B
GameSpot	8.6/10
GameSpy	7.5/10
IGN	8.6/10
Next Generation	3/5
USA Today	2/4

The game received favorable reviews according to the review aggregation website GameRankings. Evan Shamoon of NextGen said, "If you're a hockey fan and [you] own a Dreamcast, you definitely need this game. Otherwise, you may want to wait 'til next year."

The Freshman of GamePro in one review called it "a sight to behold, but once you play it you might not want to be holding it for long. Gamers weaned on the speed and control of NHL 2000 and its series might find NHL 2K a bit slow and odd for their liking. Gamers looking for a graphical spectacular, however, won't find any better." (Note: GamePro gave the game 5/5 for graphics, 4.5/5 for sound, and two 4/5 scores for control and fun factor in one review.) In another GamePro review, however, Air Hendrix said, "For its first season, NHL 2K puts out a respectabe but middling effort. Hockey fans may be willing to cut the rookie some slack, but next year they'll be expecting a lot more. In the meantime, Dreamcast gamers will have an okay time with NHL 2K, but pros will stick with this year's uncontested champ, NHL 2000." (Note: GamePro gave the game 4.5/5 for graphics, and three 3.5/5 scores for sound, control, and fun factor in another review.)

European reviews were generally positive. British publication Dreamcast Monthly awarded NHL 2K a score of 7 out of 10, praising its detailed graphics, television-style presentation and commentary, while finding its gameplay less remarkable than its visuals. French magazine Consoles + was more enthusiastic, awarding 87% and praising its realistic presentation, extensive options and detailed graphics, although it criticised the sometimes confusing animations and fast pace of play. German magazine MAN!AC awarded 82%, commending its visual presentation and ice hockey simulation, but criticising its limited options and relatively simple controls. Spanish publication Revista Oficial Dreamcast awarded the game 7 out of 10, praising its graphics, animations and accessible controls, while noting the difficulty of scoring against the opposing goalkeepers.

By March 2000, the game had reportedly sold 140,000 units. According to NPD sales data reproduced by Blast Processing!, NHL 2K had sold 316,582 copies in North America as of March 2003.
