= NHL 5-On-5 2006 =

2005 video game

- Developer(s): THQ Wireless
- Publisher(s): THQ Wireless
- Platform(s): Mobile
- Release: October 10, 2005
- Genre(s): Sports, ice hockey
- Mode(s): Single-player, multiplayer

NHL 5-On-5 2006 is an NHL ice hockey video game released in 2005. The game was released on a number of mobile devices.
