= NHL 2K9 =

2008 video game

- Cover featuring Rick Nash
- Developer: Visual Concepts
- Publisher: 2K
- Series: NHL 2K
- Platforms: PlayStation 2, PlayStation 3, Wii, Xbox 360
- Release: NA: September 10, 2008; EU: September 11, 2008; EU: November 14, 2008 (Wii)
- Genre: Sports
- Modes: Single-player, multiplayer

NHL 2K9 is an ice hockey sports video game made by 2K, part of the NHL 2K series, and published on the PlayStation 2, PlayStation 3, Wii, and Xbox 360 consoles. It features former Columbus Blue Jackets left winger Rick Nash on its cover.

== Development and release ==
A demo was released on August 13, 2008, on the PlayStation Network and on August 21 on Xbox Live Marketplace.

== Reception ==
Reception

Aggregate score
Aggregator	Score			
Aggregator	PS2	PS3	Wii	Xbox 360
Metacritic	70/100	70/100	65/100	69/100

Review scores
Publication	Score			
Publication	PS2	PS3	Wii	Xbox 360
Famitsu	21/40	23/40	N/A	23/40
Game Informer	N/A	6.75/10	N/A	6.75/10
GameRevolution	N/A	C−	N/A	C−
GameSpot	N/A	6/10	5.5/10	6/10
GameSpy	N/A	3/5	N/A	3/5
GameTrailers	N/A	N/A	N/A	7/10
GameZone	N/A	6.4/10	N/A	8/10
IGN	N/A	8/10	6.8/10	8/10
Nintendo Power	N/A	N/A	7/10	N/A
Official Xbox Magazine (US)	N/A	N/A	N/A	7/10
PlayStation: The Official Magazine	N/A	3.5/5	N/A	N/A

The game received "mixed or average reviews" according to the review aggregation website Metacritic. In Japan, where the PlayStation 2, PlayStation 3, and Xbox 360 versions were ported for release on April 29, 2009, Famitsu gave it a score of two sixes, one five, and one six for the PS3 and Xbox 360 versions; and three fives and one six for the PS2 version.

Preceded by NHL 2K8	National Hockey League Officially Licensed Videogame; 2009	Succeeded by NHL 2K10
