= NHL 2K10 =

2009 ice hockey video game

- Alexander Ovechkin on the cover of NHL 2K10
- Developer: Visual Concepts
- Publisher: 2K
- Series: NHL 2K
- Platforms: PlayStation 2, PlayStation 3, Wii, Xbox 360
- Release: NA: September 15, 2009; PAL: September 18, 2009 (PS3, X360); PAL: October 23, 2009 (Wii)
- Genre: Sports (ice hockey)

NHL 2K10 is an ice hockey sports video game developed by Visual Concepts and published by 2K, part of the NHL 2K series. It was released on September 15, 2009 for PlayStation 2, PlayStation 3, Wii, and Xbox 360. Randy Hahn and Drew Remenda provide commentary as they did for NHL 2K9. NHL 2K10 was the final 2K Sports ice hockey video game to be released for the PlayStation 2, PlayStation 3, and Xbox 360, as NHL 2K11 was released only for the iOS and Wii.

== Cover athlete ==
Washington Capitals All-Star left winger Alexander Ovechkin was confirmed as the cover athlete of NHL 2K10. This was the third time Ovechkin had been a cover athlete, as he was featured on the cover of NHL 07 and on the Russian cover of NHL 09. He would later be featured a fourth time on the cover of NHL 21.

== Reception ==
Reception

Aggregate score
Aggregator	Score			
Aggregator	PS2	PS3	Wii	Xbox 360
Metacritic	N/A	66/100	79/100	69/100

Review scores
Publication	Score			
Publication	PS2	PS3	Wii	Xbox 360
1Up.com	N/A	C	N/A	C
Famitsu	N/A	24/40	N/A	24/40
Game Informer	N/A	5.5/10	N/A	5.5/10
GameSpot	N/A	7/10	8.5/10	7/10
GameTrailers	N/A	N/A	8/10	7/10
GameZone	N/A	N/A	N/A	6.5/10
IGN	6/10	6.7/10	8/10	6.7/10
Nintendo Power	N/A	N/A	8/10	N/A
Official Xbox Magazine (US)	N/A	N/A	N/A	7/10
PlayStation: The Official Magazine	N/A	4/5	N/A	N/A

The Wii version received "generally favorable reviews", while the PlayStation 3 and Xbox 360 versions received "mixed or average reviews", according to the review aggregation website Metacritic. In Japan, Famitsu where the PlayStation 3 and Xbox 360 were ported on October 15, 2009, gave these versions a score of all four sixes for a total of 24 out of 40.
