= NHL 2K7 =

2006 video game

- The cover of NHL 2K7 featuring the San Jose Sharks' Joe Thornton.
- Developer: Kush Games
- Publisher: 2K
- Series: NHL 2K
- Platforms: PlayStation 2, PlayStation 3, Xbox, Xbox 360
- Release: PlayStation 2, Xbox & Xbox 360: NA: September 12, 2006; NA: October 2, 2006 (PS2); AU: October 20, 2006; EU: November 3, 2006; PlayStation 3: NA: November 13, 2006; AU: March 16, 2007; EU: March 23, 2007
- Genre: Sports

NHL 2K7 is an ice hockey video game made by 2K, and published on the PlayStation 3, PlayStation 2, Xbox, and Xbox 360 consoles. It features San Jose Sharks centre Joe Thornton on its cover. Bob Cole and Harry Neale return from NHL 2K6 to provide commentary. David Vyborny appeared on the cover of the PS2 version in the Czech Republic.

New features in the game include improved animations that are mainly geared towards skating. 2K7 also includes a new gameplay setting called "Cinemotion". This feature uses close up camera angles as well as dramatic music to capture the intensity of the game.

The game was also the first ice hockey simulation to be made for the PlayStation 3.

== Reception ==
Reception

Aggregate score
Aggregator	Score			
Aggregator	PS2	PS3	Xbox	Xbox 360
Metacritic	73/100	79/100	78/100	78/100

Review scores
Publication	Score			
Publication	PS2	PS3	Xbox	Xbox 360
AllGame	3.5/5	N/A	3.5/5	N/A
Electronic Gaming Monthly	N/A	N/A	N/A	6.33/10
Eurogamer	N/A	N/A	N/A	9/10
Game Informer	6.75/10	8.25/10	6.75/10	8.25/10
GamePro	N/A	N/A	N/A	4/5
GameRevolution	N/A	N/A	N/A	C+
GameSpot	7.8/10	8.3/10	7.9/10	8.3/10
GameSpy	N/A	4/5	N/A	4/5
GameTrailers	N/A	N/A	N/A	6.3/10
GameZone	N/A	8.5/10	N/A	8.9/10
IGN	8.3/10	8.6/10	8.3/10	8.9/10
Official U.S. PlayStation Magazine	5/10	N/A	N/A	N/A
Official Xbox Magazine (US)	N/A	N/A	7.5/10	7/10
Detroit Free Press	N/A	N/A	N/A	3/4

The game received "generally favorable reviews" on all platforms except the PlayStation 2 version, which received "average" reviews, according to the review aggregation website Metacritic.

== See also ==
- NHL 2K

Preceded by NHL 2K6	NHL 2K7; 2006	Succeeded by NHL 2K8
