= NHL 2K3 =

2002 video game

Sega Sports' NHL 2K3
- North American Xbox cover art
- Developer: Treyarch
- Publisher: Sega
- Series: NHL 2K
- Engine: Treyarch NGL
- Platforms: GameCube, PlayStation 2, Xbox
- Release: NA: November 12, 2002 (PS2); NA: November 19, 2002 (Xbox); NA: December 10, 2002 (GC); EU: March 28, 2003
- Genre: Sports
- Modes: Single-player, multiplayer

NHL 2K3 is an ice hockey video game developed for the GameCube, PlayStation 2, and Xbox by Treyarch and published by Sega. Jeremy Roenick is on the cover. It is the only game in the NHL 2K series to be released for GameCube. NHL 2K3 uses ESPN's presentation and was the first hockey game with support for PS2 Online and Xbox Live online services. The rosters are from the 2002–2003 NHL season.

== Reception ==
Reception

Aggregate score
Aggregator	Score		
Aggregator	GameCube	PS2	Xbox
Metacritic	89/100	89/100	89/100

Review scores
Publication	Score		
Publication	GameCube	PS2	Xbox
AllGame	4.5/5	4.5/5	4.5/5
Electronic Gaming Monthly	N/A	9.17/10	N/A
Game Informer	N/A	N/A	9.25/10
GamePro	5/5	5/5	5/5
GameRevolution	N/A	B+	N/A
GameSpot	8.6/10	8.6/10	8.8/10
GameSpy	4.5/5	4.5/5	4.5/5
GameZone	9/10	8.8/10	9/10
IGN	8.8/10	8.7/10	8.9/10
Nintendo Power	3.6/5	N/A	N/A
Official U.S. PlayStation Magazine	N/A	5/5	N/A
Official Xbox Magazine (US)	N/A	N/A	8.9/10

The game received "generally favorable reviews" on all platforms according to the review aggregation website Metacritic. It was nominated for GameSpot's annual "Best Traditional Sports Game on GameCube", "Best Traditional Sports Game on Xbox" and "Best Online Game on Xbox" awards. It was also a nominee for "Console Sports Game of the Year" at the AIAS' 6th Annual Interactive Achievement Awards, which ultimately went to Madden NFL 2003.

== See also ==
- NHL 2K

Preceded by NHL 2K2	NHL 2K3; 2002	Succeeded by ESPN NHL Hockey
