= ESPN NHL 2K5 =

2004 video game

- North American PlayStation 2 box art, featuring Martin St. Louis
- Developer: Kush Games
- Publishers: NA: Sega; PAL: Global Star Software
- Series: NHL 2K
- Platforms: PlayStation 2, Xbox
- Release: PlayStation 2: NA: September 1, 2004; EU: February 4, 2005; AU: February 7, 2005; Xbox: NA: September 1, 2004; AU: January 28, 2005; EU: February 4, 2005
- Genre: Sports (ice hockey)
- Modes: Single-player, multiplayer

ESPN NHL 2K5 is a 2004 ice hockey video game developed by Kush Games and published by Sega for the PlayStation 2 and Xbox. It is the last NHL game to be released by Sega, and the last to be branded by ESPN.

== Gameplay ==
The game includes an extensive franchise mode where the player can perform many team management functions, including hiring staff, managing player contracts, editing players, scouting new players and sending players back to minor teams for training. It also includes more traditional game modes like season, playoffs, exhibition and shootout, as well as an advanced control setting which allows much more flexible control of the player, using the entire control pad rather than only a few buttons. The game features ESPN/ABC's Gary Thorne on play-by-play commentary and Bill Clement on color commentary.

The North American release of the game features a number of specific game additions, including the ability to play the Heritage Classic, the first time an official outdoor hockey game was represented in a video game.

The controls in the game allow the player to have full stick control on both offense and defense. On the offensive side they can control their dekes by moving the right analog stick. This does a deke in the direction the analog stick was pushed. Also on offense when they want to deke out a goalie they hold the preset button (ex: for Advance hold L1+O) and move the stick with the left analog stick and then release to shoot. This provides for exciting dekes, but also on offense they can protect the puck from poke-checking defensemen by hold circle and choosing where they want to protect it with the analog stick. On the other side the defensive stick control allows them to skate backwards and also swing their stick across the ice to hit the puck away from the opposing player.

== Reception ==
Reception

Aggregate score
Aggregator	Score	
Aggregator	PS2	Xbox
Metacritic	86/100	88/100

Review scores
Publication	Score	
Publication	PS2	Xbox
Electronic Gaming Monthly	8.33/10	8.33/10
Game Informer	8/10	8/10
GamePro	4.5/5	4.5/5
GameRevolution	A−	A−
GameSpot	9.1/10	9.1/10
GameSpy	N/A	4/5
GameZone	9.3/10	N/A
IGN	9.2/10	9.2/10
Official U.S. PlayStation Magazine	4.5/5	N/A
Official Xbox Magazine (US)	N/A	8.7/10
The Sydney Morning Herald	N/A	4/5

The game received "generally favorable reviews" on both platforms according to the review aggregation website Metacritic. It received runner-up placements in GameSpot's 2004 "Best Traditional Sports Game" and "Best Budget Game" award categories across all platforms, losing both to ESPN NFL 2K5. During the 8th Annual Interactive Achievement Awards, the Academy of Interactive Arts & Sciences nominated ESPN NHL 2K5 for "Console Sports Simulation Game of the Year", which was ultimately awarded to ESPN NFL 2K5.

== See also ==
- NHL 2K

Preceded by ESPN NHL Hockey	ESPN NHL 2K5; 2004	Succeeded by NHL 2K6
