= NCAA College Basketball 2K3 =

2002 video game

- North American cover art, featuring Jay Williams
- Developers: Kush Games; Visual Concepts
- Publisher: Sega (Note: Released under the Sega Sports banner.)
- Series: College Hoops
- Platforms: PlayStation 2, GameCube, Xbox
- Release: PlayStation 2: NA: December 3, 2002; GameCube, Xbox: NA: December 10, 2002
- Genre: Sports (basketball)
- Modes: Single-player, multiplayer

NCAA College Basketball 2K3 is a 2002 basketball video game developed by Kush Games and Visual Concepts and published by Sega for the PlayStation 2, GameCube, and Xbox. It is the only game in the College Hoops series to use the "College Basketball" designation rather than "College Hoops", as well as the only game in the series to appear on the GameCube.

== Reception ==
Reception

Aggregate scores
Aggregator	Score
GameRankings	(Xbox) 84.59% (PS2) 83.05% (GC) 83%
Metacritic	(Xbox) 84/100 (PS2) 83/100 (GC) 82/100

Review scores
Publication	Score
Game Informer	5.75/10
GamePro	4.5/5
GameSpot	7.5/10 (GC) 7.3/10
GameSpy	4/5
GameZone	(GC) 9/10 (PS2) 8.9/10
IGN	8.6/10 (GC) 8.5/10
Nintendo Power	3.5/5
Official U.S. PlayStation Magazine	4/5
Official Xbox Magazine (US)	8.5/10
X-Play	4/5

The game was met with positive reception upon release. GameRankings and Metacritic gave it a score of 84.59% and 84 out of 100 for the Xbox version; 83.05% and 83 out of 100 for the PlayStation 2 version; and 83% and 82 out of 100 for the GameCube version.
