= NHL 2K6 =

2005 video game

- US cover featuring Marty Turco
- Developer: Kush Games
- Publisher: 2K
- Series: NHL 2K
- Platforms: PlayStation 2, Xbox, Xbox 360
- Release: PlayStation 2 & Xbox: NA: September 6, 2005; AU: January 20, 2006; EU: March 10, 2006; Xbox 360: NA: November 22, 2005; PAL: April 28, 2006
- Genre: Sports
- Modes: Single-player, multiplayer

NHL 2K6 is an ice hockey simulation made by 2K, and published on the Xbox, PlayStation 2, and Xbox 360 consoles. It features goaltender Marty Turco on the cover of games sold in the United States, and forward Mats Sundin on the cover of games sold in Canada and Europe.

The game brings all the features from the previous year's game, ESPN NHL 2K5, along with others. However, Hockey Night in Canada lead broadcast team of Bob Cole and Harry Neale replaces ESPN/ABC lead broadcast team of Gary Thorne and Bill Clement to provide commentary It features a new "crease control" system, which allows the player to control the player's team's goalie and make critical saves. It is the first to implement the new NHL shootout system as the default, and the first ice hockey simulation released for the Xbox 360.

== Reception ==
Reception

Aggregate score
Aggregator	Score		
Aggregator	PS2	Xbox	Xbox 360
Metacritic	81/100	83/100	75/100

Review scores
Publication	Score		
Publication	PS2	Xbox	Xbox 360
Electronic Gaming Monthly	6.83/10	6.83/10	N/A
Eurogamer	8/10	N/A	N/A
Game Informer	8/10	8/10	8.5/10
GamePro	4.5/5	4.5/5	4/5
GameSpot	8.5/10	8.5/10	7.5/10
GameSpy	4.5/5	4.5/5	N/A
GameTrailers	N/A	N/A	7.3/10
GameZone	8.9/10	9/10	8/10
IGN	8.7/10	N/A	7.5/10
Official U.S. PlayStation Magazine	4/5	N/A	N/A
Official Xbox Magazine (US)	N/A	6.7/10	8/10

The game received "favorable" reviews on all platforms according to the review aggregation website Metacritic.

== See also ==
- NHL 2K

Preceded by ESPN NHL 2K5	NHL 2K6; 2005	Succeeded by NHL 2K7
