= NHL 2K2 =

2002 video game

- North American cover art, featuring Chris Drury
- Developer: Treyarch
- Publisher: Sega (Note: Released under the Sega Sports banner.)
- Series: NHL 2K
- Platform: Dreamcast
- Release: NA: February 12, 2002; JP: July 11, 2002
- Genre: Sports (ice hockey)
- Modes: Single-player, multiplayer

NHL 2K2 is a 2002 ice hockey video game developed by Treyarch and published by Sega for the Dreamcast. It is the last licensed game for the Dreamcast to be released in North America, and was later released in Japan on July 11, 2002.

Bob Miller serves as the in-game play-by-play commentator.

== Reception ==
Metacritic gave it 80/100. IGN gave it 9.2/10. EGM gave it 8.17/10. GameSpot gave it 8.1/10.
