= ESPN NHL Hockey =

2003 video game released by Sega

- Developer: Kush Games
- Publisher: Sega
- Platforms: PlayStation 2, Xbox
- Release: NA: September 9, 2003; PAL: November 28, 2003
- Genre: Sports
- Modes: Single-player, multiplayer

ESPN NHL Hockey (also known as NHL 2K4) is a video game released by Sega in 2003. It was released for the PlayStation 2 and Xbox.

The cover athlete is Jeremy Roenick, who was then on the Philadelphia Flyers

The game uses the ESPN presentation style using ESPN graphics, music, and is featuring ESPN on-air talent. Notably, the game's commentary features a superstar booth of ESPN's legendary voice of hockey Gary Thorne and Bill Clement, who deliver play-by-play and color commentary with situational analysis bringing a true ESPN scotch bonnet flavor. ESPN NHL Hockey supports online multiplayer for up to 4 players. In line with other online-enabled games on the Xbox, multiplayer on Xbox Live was available to players until April 15, 2010. ESPN NHL Hockey is now playable online again on the replacement Xbox Live servers called Insignia.

== Reception ==
Reception

Aggregate score
Aggregator	Score	
Aggregator	PS2	Xbox
Metacritic	90/100	88/100

Review scores
Publication	Score	
Publication	PS2	Xbox
Electronic Gaming Monthly	8.83/10	8.83/10 (Note: In Electronic Gaming Monthly's review of the game, one critic gave it 8.5/10, and the rest gave it each a score of 9/10.)
Game Informer	8.5/10	8.5/10
GameRevolution	A−	A−
GameSpot	9/10	9/10
GameZone	9.5/10	9.4/10
IGN	9.3/10	9.3/10
Official U.S. PlayStation Magazine	4.5/5	N/A
Official Xbox Magazine (US)	N/A	8.9/10
TeamXbox	N/A	9.1/10
X-Play	3/5	3/5
The Village Voice	N/A	8/10

The PlayStation 2 version received "universal acclaim", while the Xbox version received "generally favorable reviews", according to the review aggregation website Metacritic. GamePro called it "a first-round pick you won't regret making". (Note: GamePro gave the game two 4/5 scores for graphics and fun factor, 5/5 for sound, and 4.5/5 for control.) GameSpot praised the game's realistic graphics, faithful visual recreation of an ESPN NHL broadcast, well-designed commentary, and unique mini-games.

The game was nominated for the "Console Sports Simulation Game of the Year" award at the Academy of Interactive Arts & Sciences' 7th Annual Interactive Achievement Awards, which went to Madden NFL 2004.
