= 2K (company) =

American video game publisher

- Logo used since 2021
- Type: Subsidiary
- Industry: Video games
- Founded: January 25, 2005; 21 years ago in New York City, U.S.
- Headquarters: Novato, California, US
- Key people: David Ismailer (president); Phil Dixon (COO)
- Products: BioShock series; Borderlands series; Civilization series; Mafia series; NBA 2K series; PGA Tour 2K series; WWE 2K series; X-COM series
- Number of employees: ~4,000
- Parent: Take-Two Interactive
- Subsidiaries: See § Studios
- Website: 2k.com

2K is an American video game publisher based in Novato, California. The company was founded as a subsidiary of Take-Two Interactive in January 2005 through the 2K Games and 2K Sports sub-labels. The nascent label incorporated several development studios owned by Take-Two, including Visual Concepts and Kush Games, which had been acquired the day before. Originally based in New York City, 2K moved to Novato in 2007. A third label, 2K Play, was added in September 2007. 2K is governed by David Ismailer as president and Phil Dixon as chief operating officer. It operates a motion capture studio in Petaluma, California.

== History ==
2K's original logo

On January 24, 2005, Take-Two Interactive acquired Visual Concepts, developer of NBA 2K, NHL 2K, and MLB 2K games that were marketed under the Sega Sports brand. Take-Two paid Sega US$24 million for Visual Concepts, its Kush Games subsidiary and the 2K series' intellectual property. On January 25, 2005, Take-Two established the 2K Publishing label including its 2K Games and 2K Sports sub-labels. The company took over some games previously to be published by Take-Two's Global Star Software label. In January 2006, some of 2K's New York City offices were damaged by a five-alarm fire. In June 2007, the company relocated to Novato, California, alongside Visual Concepts. A third sub-label, 2K Play, was established in September 2007 to focus on casual games. Later that year, Take-Two partnered with Nickelodeon to license games based on its shows. 2K Play absorbed all assets of Global Star Software, including the studio Cat Daddy Games, Carnival Games and games based on Deal or No Deal. In January 2013, 2K obtained the rights to publish video games based on WWE.

Christoph Hartmann, former President of 2K announced his resignation in May 2017 after nearly two decades with Take-Two. David Ismailer, who previously served as 2K's chief operating officer (COO), was named 2K's new President. Phil Dixon, formerly of Betfair, joined 2K as COO in November 2017. In September 2018, 2K created 2K Foundations, a social impact program that builds community and youth engagement programs and spaces for underserved communities around the world. Since its founding, dozens of NBA and WNBA stars have teamed up with 2K Foundations to refurbish more than 50 basketball courts at community centers for kids across 6 continents.

== Studios ==
- 2K Chengdu in Chengdu, China; founded in June 2011.
- 2K Madrid in Madrid, Spain; founded in June 2021.
- 2K Valencia in Valencia, Spain; founded in 2005 as Elite3D; acquired in November 2021.
- 2K Vegas in Las Vegas, Nevada, U.S.; founded in 2006 as 2K West, rebranded in 2013.
- 31st Union in San Mateo, California, U.S. and Valencia, Spain; founded in 2019 as 2K Silicon Valley, rebranded in 2020.
- Cat Daddy Games in Kirkland, Washington, U.S.; founded in 1996, acquired in 2003.
- Cloud Chamber in Novato, California, U.S. and Montreal, Canada; founded in 2019.
- Firaxis Games in Hunt Valley, Maryland, U.S.; founded in 1996, acquired in 2005.
- Gearbox Software in Frisco, Texas, U.S.; founded in 1999, acquired in 2024.
  - Gearbox Studio Montreal in Montreal, Canada; acquired in 2024.
  - Gearbox Studio Québec in Québec City, Canada; acquired in 2024.
- Hangar 13 in Novato, California, U.S., Brno and Prague, Czech Republic, and Brighton, England; founded in 2014.
- HB Studios in Lunenburg, Nova Scotia, Canada; founded in 2000, acquired in 2021.
- Mass Media in Moorpark, California, U.S.; founded in the 1980s, acquired in 2018.
- Small Axe Studios in Vancouver, British Columbia, Canada; founded in October 2023.
- Visual Concepts in Novato, California, U.S.; founded in 1988, acquired in 2005.

=== Defunct ===
- 2K Australia in Canberra, Australia; founded in 2000, acquired in 2006, closed in 2015.
- 2K China in Shanghai, China; founded in May 2006, closed in November 2015.
- 2K Czech in Brno, Czech Republic; founded in 1997, acquired in 2008, merged into Hangar 13 in 2017.
- 2K Hangzhou in Hangzhou, China; founded in 2007, closed in November 2016.
- 2K Los Angeles in Camarillo, California, U.S.; founded as Kush Games in 1998, acquired in 2005, closed in 2008.
- 2K Marin in Novato, California, U.S.; founded in 2007, closed in 2013.
- Frog City Software in San Francisco, U.S.; founded in 1994, acquired in 2003, closed in 2006.
- Indie Built in Salt Lake City, U.S.; founded as Access Software in 1982, acquired and renamed in 2004, closed in 2006.
- Irrational Games in Westwood, Massachusetts, U.S.; founded in 1997, acquired in 2006, closed in 2017 and succeeded by Ghost Story Games.
- PAM Development in Paris, France; founded in 1995, acquired in 2005, closed in 2008.
- PopTop Software in Fenton, Missouri, U.S.; founded in 1993, acquired in 2000, merged into Firaxis Games in 2006.
- Venom Games in Newcastle upon Tyne, England; founded in 2003, acquired in 2004, closed in 2008.

== Games published ==
- BioShock (since 2007)
- Borderlands (since 2009)
- Civilization (since 2005)
- Mafia (since 2010)
- X-COM (since 2012)
- NBA 2K (since 2005)
- PGA Tour 2K (since 2018)
- WWE 2K (since 2013)
- Top Spin (2005–2011, since 2024)

=== Former ===
- College Hoops 2K (2005–2007)
  - College Hoops 2K6
  - College Hoops 2K7
  - College Hoops 2K8
- MLB 2K (2005–2013)
- NHL 2K (2005–2014)

=== 2K Games Launcher ===
2K released a proprietary game launcher for computer users in 2022 alongside quality of life updates the BioShock franchise. The new game launcher gave players the opportunity to buy add on content for games. The launcher was criticized for breaking games on Linux, including on the Steam Deck. Fans of Marvel's Midnight Suns, felt the launcher impacted the game's performance. Following negative feedback, 2K began phasing out the launcher, removing it from Civilization VI and assuring it would not be used in Civilization VII. On November 18, 2024, 2K removed the launcher from every game on both Steam and Epic Games' storefronts.
