= List of 2K games =

2K is an American video game publisher based in Novato, California. The company was founded under Take-Two Interactive in January 2005 through the 2K Games and 2K Sports labels, following Take-Two Interactive's acquisition of Visual Concepts that same month. A third label, 2K Play, was added in September 2007. Notable franchises include BioShock, Borderlands, Carnival Games, Mafia, NBA 2K, Sid Meier's Civilization, WWE 2K, and XCOM.

== Games published ==
Title	Platform(s)	Release date	Developer(s)	Ref.
Major League Baseball 2K5	PlayStation 2	February 28, 2005	Kush Games / Visual Concepts	
Major League Baseball 2K5	Xbox	February 28, 2005	Kush Games / Visual Concepts	
Ford Racing 3	Microsoft Windows	March 1, 2005	Razorworks	
Ford Racing 3	PlayStation 2	March 22, 2005	Razorworks	
Ford Racing 3	Xbox	March 22, 2005	Razorworks	
Close Combat: First to Fight	Xbox	April 6, 2005	Destineer	
Close Combat: First to Fight	Microsoft Windows	April 18, 2005	Destineer	
Ford Mustang: The Legend Lives	PlayStation 2	April 19, 2005	Eutechnyx	
Ford Mustang: The Legend Lives	Xbox	April 19, 2005	Eutechnyx	
Stronghold 2	Microsoft Windows	April 19, 2005	Firefly Studios	
Motocross Mania 3	Xbox	April 27, 2005	Deibus Studios	
Motocross Mania 3	PlayStation 2	May 1, 2005	Deibus Studios	
Sid Meier's Pirates!	Xbox	July 11, 2005	Firaxis Games	
NHL 2K6	PlayStation 2	September 6, 2005	Kush Games / Visual Concepts	
NHL 2K6	Xbox	September 6, 2005	Kush Games / Visual Concepts	
NBA 2K6	PlayStation 2	September 26, 2005	Visual Concepts	
NBA 2K6	Xbox	September 26, 2005	Visual Concepts	
Top Spin	PlayStation 2	September 26, 2005	PAM Development / Indie Built	
Conflict: Global Terror	Microsoft Windows	October 4, 2005	Pivotal Games	
Conflict: Global Terror	PlayStation 2	October 4, 2005	Pivotal Games	
Conflict: Global Terror	Xbox	October 4, 2005	Pivotal Games	
Serious Sam II	Microsoft Windows	October 11, 2005	Croteam	
Serious Sam II	Xbox	October 11, 2005	Croteam	
Major League Baseball 2K5: World Series Edition	PlayStation 2	October 18, 2005	Kush Games / Visual Concepts	
Major League Baseball 2K5: World Series Edition	Xbox	October 18, 2005	Kush Games / Visual Concepts	
Shattered Union	Microsoft Windows	October 18, 2005	PopTop Software	
Shattered Union	Xbox	October 18, 2005	PopTop Software	
World Poker Tour	Game Boy Advance	October 18, 2005	Backbone Entertainment	
World Poker Tour	PlayStation 2	October 18, 2005	Coresoft	
World Poker Tour	Xbox	October 18, 2005	Coresoft	
Call of Cthulhu: Dark Corners of the Earth	Xbox	October 24, 2005	Headfirst Productions	
Vietcong 2	Microsoft Windows	October 24, 2005	Pterodon / Outsider Development	
Sid Meier's Civilization IV	Microsoft Windows	October 25, 2005	Firaxis Games	
Zathura	PlayStation 2	November 3, 2005	High Voltage Software	
Zathura	Xbox	November 3, 2005	High Voltage Software	
Ford vs Chevy	PlayStation 2	November 10, 2005	Eutechnyx	
Ford vs Chevy	Xbox	November 10, 2005	Eutechnyx	
Amped 3	Xbox 360	November 15, 2005	Indie Built	
NBA 2K6	Xbox 360	November 16, 2005	Visual Concepts	
NHL 2K6	Xbox 360	November 16, 2005	Kush Games / Visual Concepts	
College Hoops 2K6	Xbox	November 21, 2005	Visual Concepts	
College Hoops 2K6	PlayStation 2	November 30, 2005	Visual Concepts	
Torino 2006	Microsoft Windows	January 24, 2006	49Games	
Torino 2006	PlayStation 2	January 24, 2006	49Games	
Torino 2006	Xbox	January 24, 2006	49Games	
24: The Game	PlayStation 2	February 28, 2006	SCE Cambridge Studio	
College Hoops 2K6	Xbox 360	March 7, 2006	Visual Concepts	
The Elder Scrolls IV: Oblivion	Microsoft Windows	March 20, 2006	Bethesda Game Studios	
The Elder Scrolls IV: Oblivion	Xbox 360	March 20, 2006	Bethesda Game Studios	
Top Spin 2	Game Boy Advance	March 29, 2006	Magic Pockets / Indie Built	
Top Spin 2	Nintendo DS	March 29, 2006	PAM Development / Indie Built	
Top Spin 2	Xbox 360	March 29, 2006	PAM Development / Indie Built	
Major League Baseball 2K6	PlayStation 2	April 3, 2006	Kush Games / Visual Concepts	
Major League Baseball 2K6	Xbox	April 3, 2006	Kush Games / Visual Concepts	
Major League Baseball 2K6	Xbox 360	April 10, 2006	Kush Games / Visual Concepts	
Major League Baseball 2K6	PlayStation Portable	April 13, 2006	Kush Games / Visual Concepts	
World Poker Tour	PlayStation Portable	April 17, 2006	Coresoft	
The Da Vinci Code	PlayStation 2	May 15, 2006	The Collective	
The Da Vinci Code	Xbox	May 15, 2006	The Collective	
The Da Vinci Code	Microsoft Windows	May 19, 2006	The Collective	
Major League Baseball 2K6	GameCube	June 12, 2006	Kush Games / Visual Concepts	
Prey	Microsoft Windows	July 11, 2006	Human Head Studios / 3D Realms	
Prey	Xbox 360	July 11, 2006	Venom Games	
CivCity: Rome	Microsoft Windows	July 24, 2006	Firefly Studios / Firaxis Games	
Dungeon Siege II: Broken World	Microsoft Windows	August 4, 2006	Gas Powered Games	
NHL 2K7	Xbox	September 12, 2006	Kush Games / Visual Concepts	
NHL 2K7	Xbox 360	September 12, 2006	Kush Games / Visual Concepts	
NBA 2K7	PlayStation 2	September 25, 2006	Visual Concepts	
NBA 2K7	Xbox	September 25, 2006	Visual Concepts	
NBA 2K7	Xbox 360	September 25, 2006	Visual Concepts	
NHL 2K7	PlayStation 2	October 2, 2006	Kush Games / Visual Concepts	
Family Guy Video Game!	PlayStation 2	October 17, 2006	High Voltage Software	
Family Guy Video Game!	PlayStation Portable	October 17, 2006	High Voltage Software	
Family Guy Video Game!	Xbox	October 17, 2006	High Voltage Software	
Sid Meier's Railroads!	Microsoft Windows	October 17, 2006	Firaxis Games / 2K China	
Stronghold Legends	Microsoft Windows	October 23, 2006	Firefly Studios	
Dungeon Siege: Throne of Agony	PlayStation Portable	October 29, 2006	SuperVillain Studios	
NBA 2K7	PlayStation 3	November 13, 2006	Visual Concepts	
NHL 2K7	PlayStation 3	November 13, 2006	Kush Games / Visual Concepts	
College Hoops 2K7	Xbox	November 20, 2006	Visual Concepts	
College Hoops 2K7	Xbox 360	November 20, 2006	Visual Concepts	
College Hoops 2K7	PlayStation 2	December 11, 2006	Visual Concepts	
Sid Meier's Pirates!	PlayStation Portable	January 22, 2007	Full Fat Productions	
Ghost Rider	Game Boy Advance	February 13, 2007	Magic Pockets	
Ghost Rider	PlayStation 2	February 13, 2007	Climax Studios	
Ghost Rider	PlayStation Portable	February 13, 2007	Climax Studios	
Jade Empire: Special Edition	Microsoft Windows	February 27, 2007	LTI Gray Matter	
Major League Baseball 2K7	PlayStation 2	February 27, 2007	Kush Games / Visual Concepts	
Major League Baseball 2K7	PlayStation 3	February 27, 2007	Kush Games / Visual Concepts	
Major League Baseball 2K7	PlayStation Portable	February 27, 2007	Visual Concepts	
Major League Baseball 2K7	Xbox	February 27, 2007	Kush Games / Visual Concepts	
Major League Baseball 2K7	Xbox 360	February 27, 2007	Kush Games / Visual Concepts	
College Hoops 2K7	PlayStation 3	March 13, 2007	Visual Concepts	
Major League Baseball 2K7	Nintendo DS	March 19, 2007	Skyworks Technologies	
Major League Baseball 2K7	Game Boy Advance	March 19, 2007	Skyworks Technologies	
Fantastic Four: Rise of the Silver Surfer	PlayStation 2	June 15, 2007	7 Studios	
Fantastic Four: Rise of the Silver Surfer	PlayStation 3	June 15, 2007	Visual Concepts / DQ Entertainment	
Fantastic Four: Rise of the Silver Surfer	Wii	June 15, 2007	7 Studios	
Fantastic Four: Rise of the Silver Surfer	Xbox 360	June 15, 2007	Visual Concepts	
Fantastic Four: Rise of the Silver Surfer	Nintendo DS	June 17, 2007	7 Studios	
The Bigs	PlayStation 2	June 25, 2007	Blue Castle Games / Visual Concepts	
The Bigs	PlayStation 3	June 25, 2007	Blue Castle Games / Visual Concepts	
The Bigs	PlayStation Portable	June 25, 2007	Blue Castle Games / Visual Concepts	
The Bigs	Wii	June 25, 2007	Blue Castle Games / Visual Concepts	
The Bigs	Xbox 360	June 25, 2007	Blue Castle Games / Visual Concepts	
The Darkness	PlayStation 3	June 25, 2007	Starbreeze Studios	
The Darkness	Xbox 360	June 25, 2007	Starbreeze Studios	
All-Pro Football 2K8	PlayStation 3	July 16, 2007	Visual Concepts	
All-Pro Football 2K8	Xbox 360	July 16, 2007	Visual Concepts	
BioShock	Microsoft Windows	August 21, 2007	2K Boston / 2K Australia	
BioShock	Xbox 360	August 21, 2007	2K Boston / 2K Australia	
NHL 2K8	PlayStation 2	September 11, 2007	2K Los Angeles / Visual Concepts	
NHL 2K8	PlayStation 3	September 11, 2007	2K Los Angeles / Visual Concepts	
NHL 2K8	Xbox 360	September 11, 2007	2K Los Angeles / Visual Concepts	
NBA 2K8	PlayStation 2	October 2, 2007	Visual Concepts	
NBA 2K8	PlayStation 3	October 2, 2007	Visual Concepts	
NBA 2K8	Xbox 360	October 2, 2007	Visual Concepts	
MLB Power Pros	PlayStation 2	October 3, 2007	Konami	
MLB Power Pros	Wii	October 3, 2007	Konami	
Dora the Explorer: Dora Saves the Mermaids	Nintendo DS	November 5, 2007	Black Lantern Studios	
Go, Diego, Go! Safari Rescue	Nintendo DS	November 5, 2007	Black Lantern Studios	
College Hoops 2K8	PlayStation 2	November 19, 2007	Visual Concepts	
College Hoops 2K8	PlayStation 3	November 19, 2007	Visual Concepts	
College Hoops 2K8	Xbox 360	November 19, 2007	Visual Concepts	
Deal or No Deal: Secret Vault Games	Microsoft Windows	November 29, 2007	Cat Daddy Games	
Go, Diego, Go! Safari Rescue	PlayStation 2	February 13, 2008	High Voltage Software	
Go, Diego, Go! Safari Rescue	Wii	February 13, 2008	High Voltage Software	
Dora the Explorer: Dora Saves the Mermaids	PlayStation 2	February 13, 2008	Totally Games	
Major League Baseball 2K8	PlayStation 2	March 3, 2008	2K Los Angeles / Visual Concepts	
Major League Baseball 2K8	PlayStation 3	March 3, 2008	2K Los Angeles / Visual Concepts	
Major League Baseball 2K8	PlayStation Portable	March 3, 2008	Visual Concepts	
Major League Baseball 2K8	Wii	March 3, 2008	2K China	
Major League Baseball 2K8	Xbox 360	March 3, 2008	2K Los Angeles / Visual Concepts	
Major League Baseball 2K8: Fantasy All-Stars	Nintendo DS	April 14, 2008	Deep Fried Entertainment / 2K Los Angeles	
Don King Presents: Prizefighter	Xbox 360	June 10, 2008	Venom Games / 2K China / Symbio Digital Entertainment	
Top Spin 3	Nintendo DS	June 23, 2008	2K China	
Top Spin 3	PlayStation 3	June 23, 2008	PAM Development	
Top Spin 3	Wii	June 23, 2008	2K China	
Top Spin 3	Xbox 360	June 23, 2008	PAM Development	
Carnival Games	Nintendo DS	July 8, 2008	Cat Daddy Games	
Sid Meier's Civilization Revolution	Nintendo DS	July 9, 2008	Firaxis Games / 2K China	
Sid Meier's Civilization Revolution	PlayStation 3	July 9, 2008	Firaxis Games	
Sid Meier's Civilization Revolution	Xbox 360	July 9, 2008	Firaxis Games	
MLB Power Pros 2008	PlayStation 2	July 29, 2008	Konami	
MLB Power Pros 2008	Wii	July 29, 2008	Konami	
MLB Power Pros 2008	Nintendo DS	August 25, 2008	Konami	
NHL 2K9	PlayStation 2	September 8, 2008	Visual Concepts	
NHL 2K9	PlayStation 3	September 8, 2008	Visual Concepts	
NHL 2K9	Wii	September 8, 2008	Visual Concepts	
NHL 2K9	Xbox 360	September 8, 2008	Visual Concepts	
NBA 2K9	PlayStation 2	October 7, 2008	Visual Concepts	
NBA 2K9	PlayStation 3	October 7, 2008	Visual Concepts	
NBA 2K9	Xbox 360	October 7, 2008	Visual Concepts	
MLB Stickball	Xbox 360	October 8, 2008	Gaia Industries	
Carnival Games: Mini-Golf	Wii	October 20, 2008	Cat Daddy Games	
BioShock	PlayStation 3	October 21, 2008	2K Marin / Digital Extremes	
NBA 2K9	Microsoft Windows	October 21, 2008	Visual Concepts	
Dora the Explorer: Dora Saves the Snow Princess	Nintendo DS	October 28, 2008	Black Lantern Studios	
Dora the Explorer: Dora Saves the Snow Princess	PlayStation 2	October 28, 2008	High Voltage Software	
Dora the Explorer: Dora Saves the Snow Princess	Wii	October 28, 2008	High Voltage Software	
Go, Diego, Go! Great Dinosaur Rescue	Nintendo DS	October 28, 2008	Black Lantern Studios	
Go, Diego, Go! Great Dinosaur Rescue	PlayStation 2	October 28, 2008	High Voltage Software	
Go, Diego, Go! Great Dinosaur Rescue	Wii	October 28, 2008	High Voltage Software	
Wonder Pets! Save the Animals!	Nintendo DS	October 28, 2008	Black Lantern Studios	
MLB Superstars	Wii	November 10, 2008	Deep Fried Entertainment	
MLB Front Office Manager	Microsoft Windows	January 26, 2009	Blue Castle Games	
MLB Front Office Manager	PlayStation 3	January 26, 2009	Blue Castle Games	
MLB Front Office Manager	Xbox 360	January 26, 2009	Blue Castle Games	
Major League Baseball 2K9	Microsoft Windows	March 3, 2009	Visual Concepts	
Major League Baseball 2K9	PlayStation 2	March 3, 2009	Visual Concepts	
Major League Baseball 2K9	PlayStation 3	March 3, 2009	Visual Concepts	
Major League Baseball 2K9	Wii	March 3, 2009	2K China	
Major League Baseball 2K9	Xbox 360	March 3, 2009	Visual Concepts	
Major League Baseball 2K9: Fantasy All-Stars	Nintendo DS	March 3, 2009	Deep Fried Entertainment	
There's Something in the Sea	Web Browser	March 4, 2009	2K Marin	
Major League Baseball 2K9	PlayStation Portable	March 24, 2009	2K China	
Don King Boxing	Nintendo DS	March 31, 2009	2K China / Mineloader Software	
Don King Boxing	Wii	March 31, 2009	2K China	
The Bigs 2	PlayStation 2	July 7, 2009	Blue Castle Games	
The Bigs 2	PlayStation 3	July 7, 2009	Blue Castle Games	
The Bigs 2	PlayStation Portable	July 7, 2009	Blue Castle Games	
The Bigs 2	Wii	July 7, 2009	Blue Castle Games	
The Bigs 2	Xbox 360	July 7, 2009	Blue Castle Games	
Birthday Party Bash	Wii	July 14, 2009	Cat Daddy Games	
Sid Meier's Civilization Revolution	iOS	August 10, 2009	2K China / Firaxis Games	
The Bigs 2	Nintendo DS	August 25, 2009	Sensory Sweep Studios	
NBA 2K10: Draft Combine	Xbox Live Arcade	August 26, 2009	Visual Concepts	
NBA 2K10: Draft Combine	PlayStation 3	September 3, 2009	Visual Concepts	
NHL 2K10	PlayStation 2	September 15, 2009	Visual Concepts	
NHL 2K10	PlayStation 3	September 15, 2009	Visual Concepts	
NHL 2K10	Wii	September 15, 2009	Visual Concepts	
NHL 2K10	Xbox 360	September 15, 2009	Visual Concepts	
Baseball Blast!	Wii	September 29, 2009	WayForward	
NBA 2K10	Microsoft Windows	October 6, 2009	Visual Concepts	
NBA 2K10	PlayStation 2	October 6, 2009	Visual Concepts	
NBA 2K10	PlayStation 3	October 6, 2009	Visual Concepts	
NBA 2K10	PlayStation Portable	October 6, 2009	2K China	
NBA 2K10	Wii	October 6, 2009	Visual Concepts	
NBA 2K10	Xbox 360	October 6, 2009	Visual Concepts	
Axel & Pixel	Xbox Live Arcade	October 14, 2009	Silver Wish Games	
Borderlands	PlayStation 3	October 20, 2009	Gearbox Software / Critical Mass Interactive / Demiurge Studios	
Borderlands	Xbox 360	October 20, 2009	Gearbox Software / Critical Mass Interactive / Demiurge Studios	
Borderlands	Microsoft Windows	October 26, 2009	Gearbox Software / Critical Mass Interactive / Demiurge Studios	
Dora Puppy	Nintendo DS	November 5, 2009	Black Lantern Studios	
Dora the Explorer: Dora Saves the Crystal Kingdom	PlayStation 2	November 5, 2009	High Voltage Software	
Dora the Explorer: Dora Saves the Crystal Kingdom	Wii	November 5, 2009	High Voltage Software	
Ni Hao, Kai-Lan: New Year Celebration	Nintendo DS	November 5, 2009	Black Lantern Studios	
Ni Hao, Kai-Lan: Super Game Day	PlayStation 2	November 5, 2009	High Voltage Software	
Ni Hao, Kai-Lan: Super Game Day	Wii	November 5, 2009	High Voltage Software	
The Backyardigans	Nintendo DS	November 5, 2009	Black Lantern Studios	
Ringling Bros. and Barnum & Bailey: Circus Friends – Asian Elephants	Nintendo DS	November 10, 2009	Cat Daddy Games	
Ringling Bros. and Barnum & Bailey: The Greatest Show on Earth	Wii	November 10, 2009	Cat Daddy Games	
BioShock 2	Microsoft Windows	February 9, 2010	2K Marin / 2K Australia / Digital Extremes / Arkane Studios / 2K Boston	
BioShock 2	PlayStation 3	February 9, 2010	2K Marin / 2K Australia / Digital Extremes / Arkane Studios / 2K Boston	
BioShock 2	Xbox 360	February 9, 2010	2K Marin / 2K Australia / Digital Extremes / Arkane Studios / 2K Boston	
The Misadventures of P.B. Winterbottom	Xbox Live Arcade	February 17, 2010	The Odd Gentlemen	
Major League Baseball 2K10	Microsoft Windows	March 2, 2010	Visual Concepts	
Major League Baseball 2K10	Nintendo DS	March 2, 2010	Powerhead Studios	
Major League Baseball 2K10	PlayStation 2	March 2, 2010	2K China	
Major League Baseball 2K10	PlayStation 3	March 2, 2010	Visual Concepts	
Major League Baseball 2K10	PlayStation Portable	March 2, 2010	2K China	
Major League Baseball 2K10	Wii	March 2, 2010	2K China	
Major League Baseball 2K10	Xbox 360	March 2, 2010	Visual Concepts	
The Misadventures of P.B. Winterbottom	Microsoft Windows	April 20, 2010	2K Hangzhou	
Dora the Explorer: Dora's Big Birthday Adventure	Nintendo DS	August 3, 2010	Black Lantern Studios	
Mafia II	Microsoft Windows	August 24, 2010	2K Czech	
Mafia II	PlayStation 3	August 24, 2010	2K Czech	
Mafia II	Xbox 360	August 24, 2010	2K Czech	
NHL 2K11	iOS	August 24, 2010	2K China	
NHL 2K11	Wii	August 24, 2010	Visual Concepts	
Carnival Games	iOS	September 10, 2010	2K China	
New Carnival Games	Nintendo DS	September 21, 2010	Cat Daddy Games	
New Carnival Games	Wii	September 21, 2010	Cat Daddy Games	
Sid Meier's Civilization V	Microsoft Windows	September 21, 2010	Firaxis Games / 2K Shanghai	
NBA 2K11	Microsoft Windows	October 5, 2010	Visual Concepts	
NBA 2K11	PlayStation 2	October 5, 2010	Visual Concepts	
NBA 2K11	PlayStation 3	October 5, 2010	Visual Concepts	
NBA 2K11	PlayStation Portable	October 5, 2010	2K China	
NBA 2K11	Wii	October 5, 2010	Visual Concepts	
NBA 2K11	Xbox 360	October 5, 2010	Visual Concepts	
Sid Meier's Pirates!	Wii	October 5, 2010	2K China / Virtuos	
Axel & Pixel	Microsoft Windows	October 6, 2010	Silver Wish Games	
Dora the Explorer: Dora's Big Birthday Adventure	PlayStation 2	October 26, 2010	High Voltage Software	
Dora the Explorer: Dora's Big Birthday Adventure	Wii	October 26, 2010	High Voltage Software	
Dora's Cooking Club	Nintendo DS	October 26, 2010	Black Lantern Studios	
Mega Bloks: Diego's Build and Rescue	Nintendo DS	October 26, 2010	Black Lantern Studios	
Nickelodeon Fit	Wii	November 10, 2010	High Voltage Software	
Carnival Games Volume II	iOS	February 9, 2011	2K China	
Major League Baseball 2K11	Microsoft Windows	March 8, 2011	Visual Concepts	
Major League Baseball 2K11	Nintendo DS	March 8, 2011	Virtuos	
Major League Baseball 2K11	PlayStation 2	March 8, 2011	Virtuos / 2K China	
Major League Baseball 2K11	PlayStation 3	March 8, 2011	Visual Concepts	
Major League Baseball 2K11	PlayStation Portable	March 8, 2011	Virtuos / 2K China	
Major League Baseball 2K11	Wii	March 8, 2011	2K China	
Major League Baseball 2K11	Xbox 360	March 8, 2011	Visual Concepts	
Top Spin 4	PlayStation 3	March 15, 2011	2K Czech / 2K China	
Top Spin 4	Wii	March 15, 2011	2K China	
Top Spin 4	Xbox 360	March 15, 2011	2K Czech / 2K China	
Duke Nudem	Web Browser	May 16, 2011	Ralph Creative Agency	
Duke Nukem Forever	Microsoft Windows	June 14, 2011	Gearbox Software / Triptych Games / Piranha Games / 3D Realms	
Duke Nukem Forever	PlayStation 3	June 14, 2011	Gearbox Software / Triptych Games / Piranha Games / 3D Realms	
Duke Nukem Forever	Xbox 360	June 14, 2011	Gearbox Software / Triptych Games / Piranha Games / 3D Realms	
Sid Meier's Civilization World	Facebook	July 6, 2011	Firaxis Games	
Sid Meier's Pirates!	iOS	July 21, 2011	2K Hangzhou	
Nicktoons MLB	Nintendo DS	September 13, 2011	Black Lantern Studios	
Nicktoons MLB	Wii	September 13, 2011	High Voltage Software	
Nicktoons MLB	Xbox 360	September 13, 2011	High Voltage Software	
NBA 2K12	iOS	October 4, 2011	2K China	
NBA 2K12	Microsoft Windows	October 4, 2011	Visual Concepts	
NBA 2K12	PlayStation 2	October 4, 2011	Virtuos / 2K China	
NBA 2K12	PlayStation 3	October 4, 2011	Visual Concepts	
NBA 2K12	PlayStation Portable	October 4, 2011	Virtuos	
NBA 2K12	Wii	October 4, 2011	Virtuos / 2K China	
NBA 2K12	Xbox 360	October 4, 2011	Visual Concepts	
Dora & Kai-Lan's Pet Shelter	Nintendo DS	November 1, 2011	Black Lantern Studios	
Team Umizoomi	Nintendo DS	November 1, 2011	Black Lantern Studios	
Nickelodeon Dance	Kinect	November 8, 2011	High Voltage Software	
Nickelodeon Dance	Wii	November 8, 2011	High Voltage Software	
Let's Cheer!	Kinect	November 15, 2011	Cat Daddy Games	
Carnival Games: Wild West 3D	Nintendo 3DS	November 21, 2011	Cat Daddy Games	
The Darkness II	Microsoft Windows	February 7, 2012	Digital Extremes / 2K China	
The Darkness II	PlayStation 3	February 7, 2012	Digital Extremes / 2K China	
The Darkness II	Xbox 360	February 7, 2012	Digital Extremes / 2K China	
Carnival Games: Monkey See, Monkey Do	Kinect	March 6, 2012	Cat Daddy Games	
Major League Baseball 2K12	Microsoft Windows	March 6, 2012	Visual Concepts	
Major League Baseball 2K12	Nintendo DS	March 6, 2012	Virtuos	
Major League Baseball 2K12	PlayStation 2	March 6, 2012	Virtuos / 2K China	
Major League Baseball 2K12	PlayStation 3	March 6, 2012	Visual Concepts	
Major League Baseball 2K12	PlayStation Portable	March 6, 2012	Virtuos / 2K China	
Major League Baseball 2K12	Wii	March 6, 2012	Virtuos	
Major League Baseball 2K12	Xbox 360	March 6, 2012	Visual Concepts	
Nicktoons MLB 3D	Nintendo 3DS	March 6, 2012	Black Lantern Studios	
Sid Meier's Civilization Revolution	Windows Phone	March 26, 2012	2K China / Firaxis Games	
Sid Meier's Pirates!	Windows Phone	April 9, 2012	2K China	
Spec Ops: The Line	Microsoft Windows	June 26, 2012	Yager Development / Darkside Game Studios / Blind Squirrel Games	
Spec Ops: The Line	PlayStation 3	June 26, 2012	Yager Development / Darkside Game Studios / Blind Squirrel Games	
Spec Ops: The Line	Xbox 360	June 26, 2012	Yager Development / Darkside Game Studios / Blind Squirrel Games	
Comedy Central's Indecision Game	Android	July 10, 2012	Cat Daddy Games / 345 Games	
Comedy Central's Indecision Game	iOS	July 10, 2012	Cat Daddy Games / 345 Games	
NBA 2K All Stars	GREE	July 19, 2012	CyberX	
House Pest featuring Fiasco the Cat	Android	September 10, 2012	Cat Daddy Games	
House Pest featuring Fiasco the Cat	Fire OS	September 10, 2012	Cat Daddy Games	
House Pest featuring Fiasco the Cat	iOS	September 10, 2012	Cat Daddy Games	
Borderlands 2	Microsoft Windows	September 18, 2012	Gearbox Software	
Borderlands 2	PlayStation 3	September 18, 2012	Gearbox Software	
Borderlands 2	Xbox 360	September 18, 2012	Gearbox Software	
GridBlock	Android	September 20, 2012	Cat Daddy Games	
GridBlock	iOS	September 20, 2012	Cat Daddy Games	
NBA 2K13	Android	October 2, 2012	2K China	
NBA 2K13	iOS	October 2, 2012	2K China	
NBA 2K13	Microsoft Windows	October 2, 2012	Visual Concepts / 2K China	
NBA 2K13	PlayStation 3	October 2, 2012	Visual Concepts / 2K China	
NBA 2K13	PlayStation Portable	October 2, 2012	Virtuos	
NBA 2K13	Wii	October 2, 2012	Virtuos	
NBA 2K13	Xbox 360	October 2, 2012	Visual Concepts / 2K China	
NBA 2K MyLIFE	Facebook	October 2, 2012	Visual Concepts	
MyNBA 2K	Android	October 5, 2012	Visual Concepts	
MyNBA 2K	iOS	October 5, 2012	Visual Concepts	
XCOM: Enemy Unknown	Microsoft Windows	October 9, 2012	Firaxis Games / 2K China / Blind Squirrel Games / Darkside Game Studios / Digital Extremes	
XCOM: Enemy Unknown	PlayStation 3	October 9, 2012	Firaxis Games / 2K China / Blind Squirrel Games / Darkside Game Studios / Digital Extremes	
XCOM: Enemy Unknown	Xbox 360	October 9, 2012	Firaxis Games / 2K China / Blind Squirrel Games / Darkside Game Studios / Digital Extremes	
Borderlands Legends	iOS	October 31, 2012	Gearbox Software	
Bubble Guppies	Nintendo DS	November 6, 2012	Black Lantern Studios	
Nickelodeon Dance 2	Kinect	November 6, 2012	High Voltage Software	
Nickelodeon Dance 2	Wii	November 6, 2012	High Voltage Software	
Team Umizoomi & Dora's Fantastic Flight	Nintendo DS	November 6, 2012	Black Lantern Studios	
NBA 2K13	Wii U	November 18, 2012	Visual Concepts / 2K China	
Herd, Herd, Herd	iOS	December 6, 2012	Cat Daddy Games	
Herd, Herd, Herd	Android	January 9, 2013	Cat Daddy Games	
Herd, Herd, Herd	Fire OS	January 9, 2013	Cat Daddy Games	
BioShock Infinite: Industrial Revolution	Web Browser	January 24, 2013	Lazy 8 Studios	
Major League Baseball 2K13	PlayStation 3	March 5, 2013	Visual Concepts	
Major League Baseball 2K13	Xbox 360	March 5, 2013	Visual Concepts	
BioShock Infinite	Microsoft Windows	March 26, 2013	Irrational Games / 2K Australia	
BioShock Infinite	PlayStation 3	March 26, 2013	Irrational Games / 2K Australia	
BioShock Infinite	Xbox 360	March 26, 2013	Irrational Games / 2K Australia	
Haunted Hollow	iOS	May 2, 2013	Firaxis Games	
Pro Baseball 2K	Microsoft Windows	May 2, 2013	Nexon	
Sid Meier's Ace Patrol	iOS	May 9, 2013	Firaxis Games	
Beejumbled	Android	June 13, 2013	Cat Daddy Games	
Beejumbled	iOS	June 13, 2013	Cat Daddy Games	
XCOM: Enemy Unknown	iOS	June 20, 2013	2K China / Virtuos	
Turd Birds	Android	July 11, 2013	Cat Daddy Games	
Turd Birds	iOS	July 11, 2013	Cat Daddy Games	
The Bureau: XCOM Declassified	Microsoft Windows	August 20, 2013	2K Marin / 2K Australia / 2K China	
The Bureau: XCOM Declassified	PlayStation 3	August 20, 2013	2K Marin / 2K Australia / 2K China	
The Bureau: XCOM Declassified	Xbox 360	August 20, 2013	2K Marin / 2K Australia / 2K China	
Sid Meier's Ace Patrol	Microsoft Windows	August 27, 2013	Firaxis Games	
2K Drive	iOS	September 5, 2013	Lucid Games	
NBA 2K14	Fire OS	October 1, 2013	Visual Concepts China	
NBA 2K14	iOS	October 1, 2013	Visual Concepts China	
NBA 2K14	Microsoft Windows	October 1, 2013	Visual Concepts / Visual Concepts China	
NBA 2K14	PlayStation 3	October 1, 2013	Visual Concepts / Visual Concepts China	
NBA 2K14	Xbox 360	October 1, 2013	Visual Concepts / Visual Concepts China	
WWE 2K14	PlayStation 3	October 29, 2013	Yuke's / Visual Concepts	
WWE 2K14	Xbox 360	October 29, 2013	Yuke's / Visual Concepts	
MyNBA 2K14	Android	November 8, 2013	Cat Daddy Games	
MyNBA 2K14	Fire OS	November 8, 2013	Cat Daddy Games	
MyNBA 2K14	iOS	November 8, 2013	Cat Daddy Games	
NBA 2K14	PlayStation 4	November 15, 2013	Visual Concepts / Visual Concepts China	
NBA 2K14	Xbox One	November 19, 2013	Visual Concepts / Visual Concepts China	
Sensei Wars	Android	December 11, 2013	Cat Daddy Games	
Sensei Wars	iOS	December 11, 2013	Cat Daddy Games	
NBA 2K14	Android	March 27, 2014	Visual Concepts China	
XCOM: Enemy Unknown	Android	April 25, 2014	2K China / Virtuos	
Borderlands 2	PlayStation Vita	May 13, 2014	Iron Galaxy Studios	
Sid Meier's Civilization Revolution 2	iOS	July 2, 2014	2K China / Firaxis Games	
WWE SuperCard	Android	August 14, 2014	Cat Daddy Games	
WWE SuperCard	Fire OS	August 14, 2014	Cat Daddy Games	
WWE SuperCard	iOS	August 14, 2014	Cat Daddy Games	
BioShock	iOS	August 28, 2014	2K China	
NBA 2K15	Microsoft Windows	October 7, 2014	Visual Concepts	
NBA 2K15	PlayStation 3	October 7, 2014	Visual Concepts	
NBA 2K15	PlayStation 4	October 7, 2014	Visual Concepts	
NBA 2K15	Xbox 360	October 7, 2014	Visual Concepts	
NBA 2K15	Xbox One	October 7, 2014	Visual Concepts	
MyNBA 2K15	Android	October 13, 2014	Cat Daddy Games	
MyNBA 2K15	iOS	October 13, 2014	Cat Daddy Games	
Borderlands: The Pre-Sequel!	Microsoft Windows	October 14, 2014	2K Australia / Gearbox Software / Darkside Game Studios / 2K China	
Borderlands: The Pre-Sequel!	PlayStation 3	October 14, 2014	2K Australia / Gearbox Software / Darkside Game Studios / 2K China	
Borderlands: The Pre-Sequel!	Xbox 360	October 14, 2014	2K Australia / Gearbox Software / Darkside Game Studios / 2K China	
NBA 2K15	Android	October 15, 2014	Visual Concepts China	
NBA 2K15	Fire OS	October 15, 2014	Visual Concepts China	
NBA 2K15	iOS	October 15, 2014	Visual Concepts China	
NHL 2K	Android	October 23, 2014	Visual Concepts China / Virtuos	
NHL 2K	iOS	October 23, 2014	Visual Concepts China / Virtuos	
Sid Meier's Civilization: Beyond Earth	Microsoft Windows	October 24, 2014	Firaxis Games	
WWE 2K15	PlayStation 3	October 28, 2014	Yuke's / Visual Concepts / QLOC / Mineloader / Winking Entertainment / Original Force / Pixelgun Studio	
WWE 2K15	Xbox 360	October 28, 2014	Yuke's / Visual Concepts / QLOC / Mineloader / Winking Entertainment / Original Force / Pixelgun Studio	
Sid Meier's Civilization Revolution 2	Android	November 7, 2014	2K China / Firaxis Games	
WWE 2K15	PlayStation 4	November 18, 2014	Yuke's / Visual Concepts	
WWE 2K15	Xbox One	November 18, 2014	Yuke's / Visual Concepts	
Evolve: Hunter's Quest	Android	January 29, 2015	Cat Daddy Games	
Evolve: Hunter's Quest	iOS	January 29, 2015	Cat Daddy Games	
Evolve: Hunter's Quest	Windows Phone	January 29, 2015	Cat Daddy Games	
Evolve	Microsoft Windows	February 10, 2015	Turtle Rock Studios / Agora Games / Blind Squirrel Games / Crytek / IllFonic / Mass Media Games	
Evolve	PlayStation 4	February 10, 2015	Mass Media Games	
Evolve	Xbox One	February 10, 2015	Turtle Rock Studios / Agora Games / Blind Squirrel Games / Crytek / IllFonic / Mass Media Games	
Sid Meier's Starships	iOS	March 12, 2015	Firaxis Games	
Sid Meier's Starships	macOS	March 12, 2015	Firaxis Games	
Sid Meier's Starships	Microsoft Windows	March 12, 2015	Firaxis Games	
Borderlands: The Handsome Collection	PlayStation 4	March 24, 2015	Armature Studio / Iron Galaxy Studios	
Borderlands: The Handsome Collection	Xbox One	March 24, 2015	Armature Studio / Iron Galaxy Studios	
WWE 2K	Android	April 16, 2015	N-Space	
WWE 2K	Fire OS	April 16, 2015	N-Space	
WWE 2K	iOS	April 16, 2015	N-Space	
WWE 2K15	Windows	April 28, 2015	QLOC	
WWE SuperCard – Season 2	Android	August 20, 2015	Cat Daddy Games	
WWE SuperCard – Season 2	Fire OS	August 20, 2015	Cat Daddy Games	
WWE SuperCard – Season 2	iOS	August 20, 2015	Cat Daddy Games	
NBA 2K16	Microsoft Windows	September 29, 2015	Visual Concepts	
NBA 2K16	PlayStation 3	September 29, 2015	Visual Concepts / Visual Concepts South Korea	
NBA 2K16	PlayStation 4	September 29, 2015	Visual Concepts	
NBA 2K16	Xbox 360	September 29, 2015	Visual Concepts / Visual Concepts South Korea	
NBA 2K16	Xbox One	September 29, 2015	Visual Concepts	
MyNBA 2K16	Android	October 1, 2015	Cat Daddy Games	
MyNBA 2K16	iOS	October 1, 2015	Cat Daddy Games	
NHL SuperCard	Android	October 8, 2015	Cat Daddy Games / Wahoo Studios	
NHL SuperCard	Fire OS	October 8, 2015	Cat Daddy Games / Wahoo Studios	
NHL SuperCard	iOS	October 8, 2015	Cat Daddy Games / Wahoo Studios	
NBA 2K16	Android	October 14, 2015	Visual Concepts China	
NBA 2K16	iOS	October 14, 2015	Visual Concepts China	
WWE 2K16	PlayStation 3	October 27, 2015	Yuke's / Visual Concepts	
WWE 2K16	PlayStation 4	October 27, 2015	Yuke's / Visual Concepts	
WWE 2K16	Xbox 360	October 27, 2015	Yuke's / Visual Concepts	
WWE 2K16	Xbox One	October 27, 2015	Yuke's / Visual Concepts	
Sid Meier's Civilization Online	Microsoft Windows	December 2, 2015	XL Games	
XCOM 2	Microsoft Windows	February 5, 2016	Firaxis Games / The Workshop	
WWE 2K16	Windows	March 11, 2016	QLOC	
XCOM: Enemy Unknown Plus	PlayStation Vita	March 22, 2016	Firaxis Games	
Sid Meier's Civilization Revolution 2 Plus	PlayStation Vita	March 29, 2016	Firaxis Games	
Borderlands: The Pre-Sequel!	Android	March 31, 2016	Gearbox Software	
Battleborn Tap	Android	April 27, 2016	Bee Square	
Battleborn Tap	iOS	April 27, 2016	Bee Square	
Battleborn	Microsoft Windows	May 3, 2016	Gearbox Software	
Battleborn	PlayStation 4	May 3, 2016	Gearbox Software	
Battleborn	Xbox One	May 3, 2016	Gearbox Software	
Evolve Stage 2	Microsoft Windows	July 7, 2016	Turtle Rock Studios	
Borderlands 2	Android	July 21, 2016	Gearbox Software	
MyNBA 2K17	Android	September 8, 2016	Cat Daddy Games	
MyNBA 2K17	Fire OS	September 8, 2016	Cat Daddy Games	
MyNBA 2K17	iOS	September 8, 2016	Cat Daddy Games	
NBA 2K17: The Prelude	PlayStation 4	September 9, 2016	Visual Concepts	
NBA 2K17: The Prelude	Xbox One	September 9, 2016	Visual Concepts	
BioShock: The Collection	PlayStation 4	September 13, 2016	Blind Squirrel Games	
BioShock: The Collection	Xbox One	September 13, 2016	Blind Squirrel Games	
BioShock Remastered	Microsoft Windows	September 15, 2016	Blind Squirrel Games	
BioShock 2 Remastered	Microsoft Windows	September 15, 2016	Blind Squirrel Games	
NBA 2K17	Microsoft Windows	September 20, 2016	Visual Concepts	
NBA 2K17	PlayStation 3	September 20, 2016	Virtuos / Visual Concepts	
NBA 2K17	PlayStation 4	September 20, 2016	Visual Concepts	
NBA 2K17	Xbox 360	September 20, 2016	Virtuos / Visual Concepts	
NBA 2K17	Xbox One	September 20, 2016	Visual Concepts	
NBA 2K17	Android	September 22, 2016	Visual Concepts China	
NBA 2K17	iOS	September 22, 2016	Visual Concepts China	
XCOM 2	PlayStation 4	September 27, 2016	Firaxis Games / Blind Squirrel Games	
XCOM 2	Xbox One	September 27, 2016	Firaxis Games / Blind Squirrel Games	
Mafia III	Microsoft Windows	October 7, 2016	Hangar 13 / 2K Czech / 22nd Century Toys / Blind Squirrel Games / Certain Affinity / Mass Media Games	
Mafia III	PlayStation 4	October 7, 2016	Hangar 13 / 2K Czech / 22nd Century Toys / Blind Squirrel Games / Certain Affinity / Mass Media Games	
Mafia III	Xbox One	October 7, 2016	Hangar 13 / 2K Czech / 22nd Century Toys / Blind Squirrel Games / Certain Affinity / Mass Media Games	
Mafia III: Rivals	Android	October 7, 2016	Cat Daddy Games	
Mafia III: Rivals	iOS	October 7, 2016	Cat Daddy Games	
WWE 2K17	PlayStation 3	October 11, 2016	Yuke's / Visual Concepts	
WWE 2K17	PlayStation 4	October 11, 2016	Yuke's / Visual Concepts	
WWE 2K17	Xbox 360	October 11, 2016	Yuke's / Visual Concepts	
WWE 2K17	Xbox One	October 11, 2016	Yuke's / Visual Concepts	
NHL SuperCard 2K17	Android	October 13, 2016	Koolhaus Games / Cat Daddy Games	
NHL SuperCard 2K17	Fire OS	October 13, 2016	Koolhaus Games / Cat Daddy Games	
NHL SuperCard 2K17	iOS	October 13, 2016	Koolhaus Games / Cat Daddy Games	
Sid Meier's Civilization VI	Microsoft Windows	October 21, 2016	Firaxis Games	
Carnival Games VR	HTC Vive	October 28, 2016	Cat Daddy Games / Wahoo Studios	
Carnival Games VR	PlayStation VR	October 28, 2016	Cat Daddy Games / Wahoo Studios	
WWE SuperCard – Season 3	Android	November 16, 2016	Cat Daddy Games	
WWE SuperCard – Season 3	Fire OS	November 16, 2016	Cat Daddy Games	
WWE SuperCard – Season 3	iOS	November 16, 2016	Cat Daddy Games	
NBA 2KVR Experience	HTC Vive	November 22, 2016	Specular Interactive / Visual Concepts	
NBA 2KVR Experience	Oculus Rift	November 22, 2016	Specular Interactive / Visual Concepts	
NBA 2KVR Experience	PlayStation VR	November 22, 2016	Specular Interactive / Visual Concepts	
NBA 2KVR Experience	Samsung Gear VR	November 22, 2016	Specular Interactive / Visual Concepts	
Carnival Games VR	Oculus Rift	December 6, 2016	Cat Daddy Games / Wahoo Studios	
WWE 2K17	Microsoft Windows	February 7, 2017	Yuke's / Visual Concepts	
Battleborn: Free Trial	Microsoft Windows	June 6, 2017	Gearbox Software	
Battleborn: Free Trial	PlayStation 4	June 6, 2017	Gearbox Software	
Battleborn: Free Trial	Xbox One	June 6, 2017	Gearbox Software	
MyNBA 2K18	Android	September 7, 2017	Cat Daddy Games	
MyNBA 2K18	iOS	September 7, 2017	Cat Daddy Games	
NBA 2K18: The Prelude	PlayStation 4	September 8, 2017	Visual Concepts	
NBA 2K18: The Prelude	Xbox One	September 8, 2017	Visual Concepts	
NBA 2K18	Microsoft Windows	September 19, 2017	Visual Concepts / Visual Concepts	
NBA 2K18	Nintendo Switch	September 19, 2017	Visual Concepts / Visual Concepts	
NBA 2K18	PlayStation 3	September 19, 2017	Virtuos / Visual Concepts	
NBA 2K18	PlayStation 4	September 19, 2017	Visual Concepts / Visual Concepts Orange County	
NBA 2K18	Xbox 360	September 19, 2017	Virtuos / Visual Concepts	
NBA 2K18	Xbox One	September 19, 2017	Visual Concepts / Visual Concepts Orange County	
NBA 2K18	iOS	September 21, 2017	Visual Concepts China	
NHL SuperCard 2K18	Android	October 4, 2017	Koolhaus Games / Cat Daddy Games	
NHL SuperCard 2K18	iOS	October 4, 2017	Koolhaus Games / Cat Daddy Games	
WWE 2K18	Microsoft Windows	October 17, 2017	Yuke's / Visual Concepts	
WWE 2K18	PlayStation 4	October 17, 2017	Yuke's / Visual Concepts	
WWE 2K18	Xbox One	October 17, 2017	Yuke's / Visual Concepts	
WWE SuperCard – Season 4	Android	November 16, 2017	Cat Daddy Games	
WWE SuperCard – Season 4	Fire OS	November 16, 2017	Cat Daddy Games	
WWE SuperCard – Season 4	iOS	November 16, 2017	Cat Daddy Games	
WWE 2K18	Nintendo Switch	December 6, 2017	Blind Squirrel Games	
NBA 2K18	Android	December 15, 2017	Visual Concepts China / Visual Concepts South Korea	
NBA 2K Online 2	Tencent	August 2, 2018	Tencent Games	
The Golf Club 2019 featuring PGA Tour	Microsoft Windows	August 28, 2018	HB Studios	
The Golf Club 2019 featuring PGA Tour	PlayStation 4	August 28, 2018	HB Studios	
The Golf Club 2019 featuring PGA Tour	Xbox One	August 28, 2018	HB Studios	
MyNBA 2K19	Android	August 30, 2018	Koolhaus Games / Cat Daddy Games	
MyNBA 2K19	iOS	August 30, 2018	Koolhaus Games / Cat Daddy Games	
NBA 2K19: The Prelude	PlayStation 4	August 31, 2018	Visual Concepts	
NBA 2K19: The Prelude	Xbox One	August 31, 2018	Visual Concepts	
NBA 2K19	Microsoft Windows	September 11, 2018	Visual Concepts (Note: Developed by Visual Concepts Budapest, Novato and Orange County.)	
NBA 2K19	Nintendo Switch	September 11, 2018	Visual Concepts	
NBA 2K19	PlayStation 4	September 11, 2018	Visual Concepts	
NBA 2K19	Xbox One	September 11, 2018	Visual Concepts	
NBA 2K19	iOS	September 26, 2018	Visual Concepts China / Visual Concepts South Korea	
WWE 2K19	Microsoft Windows	October 9, 2018	Yuke's / Visual Concepts	
WWE 2K19	PlayStation 4	October 9, 2018	Yuke's / Visual Concepts	
WWE 2K19	Xbox One	October 9, 2018	Yuke's / Visual Concepts	
NBA 2K Playgrounds 2	Microsoft Windows	October 16, 2018	Saber Interactive	
NBA 2K Playgrounds 2	Nintendo Switch	October 16, 2018	Saber Interactive	
NBA 2K Playgrounds 2	PlayStation 4	October 16, 2018	Saber Interactive	
NBA 2K Playgrounds 2	Xbox One	October 16, 2018	Saber Interactive	
NBA 2K19	Android	October 17, 2018	Visual Concepts China / Visual Concepts South Korea	
Carnival Games	Nintendo Switch	November 6, 2018	Mass Media Games	
Carnival Games	PlayStation 4	November 6, 2018	Mass Media Games	
Carnival Games	Xbox One	November 6, 2018	Mass Media Games	
WWE SuperCard – Season 5	Android	November 14, 2018	Cat Daddy Games	
WWE SuperCard – Season 5	Fire OS	November 14, 2018	Cat Daddy Games	
WWE SuperCard – Season 5	iOS	November 14, 2018	Cat Daddy Games	
Sid Meier's Civilization VI	Nintendo Switch	November 16, 2018	Aspyr	
NBA 2K Mobile	iOS	November 19, 2018	Cat Daddy Games	
Borderlands 2 VR	PlayStation VR	December 14, 2018	Gearbox Software	
Borderlands 2: Ultra HD	Microsoft Windows	April 3, 2019	Hangar 13	
Borderlands: Game of the Year Edition	PlayStation 4	April 3, 2019	Blind Squirrel Games	
Borderlands: Game of the Year Edition	Xbox One	April 3, 2019	Blind Squirrel Games	
Borderlands: Game of the Year Enhanced	Microsoft Windows	April 3, 2019	Blind Squirrel Games	
Borderlands: The Handsome Collection – Ultra HD	PlayStation 4	April 3, 2019	Hangar 13	
Borderlands: The Handsome Collection – Ultra HD	Xbox One	April 3, 2019	Hangar 13	
Borderlands: The Pre-Sequel! – Ultra HD	Microsoft Windows	April 3, 2019	Hangar 13	
NBA 2K Mobile	Android	April 17, 2019	Cat Daddy Games	
MyNBA 2K20	Android	August 20, 2019	Koolhaus Games / Cat Daddy Games	
MyNBA 2K20	iOS	August 20, 2019	Koolhaus Games / Cat Daddy Games	
NBA 2K20 Demo	Nintendo Switch	August 21, 2019	Visual Concepts	
NBA 2K20 Demo	PlayStation 4	August 21, 2019	Visual Concepts	
NBA 2K20 Demo	Xbox One	August 21, 2019	Visual Concepts	
NBA 2K20	Android	September 4, 2019	Visual Concepts China / Visual Concepts South Korea	
NBA 2K20	iOS	September 4, 2019	Visual Concepts China / Visual Concepts South Korea	
NBA 2K Mobile - Season 2	Android	September 5, 2019	Cat Daddy Games	
NBA 2K Mobile - Season 2	iOS	September 5, 2019	Cat Daddy Games	
NBA 2K20	Microsoft Windows	September 6, 2019	Visual Concepts (Note: Developed by Visual Concepts Budapest, Novato and Orange County.)	
NBA 2K20	Nintendo Switch	September 6, 2019	Visual Concepts	
NBA 2K20	PlayStation 4	September 6, 2019	Visual Concepts	
NBA 2K20	Xbox One	September 6, 2019	Visual Concepts	
Borderlands 3	Microsoft Windows	September 13, 2019	Gearbox Software (Note: Developed by Gearbox Software Frisco and Québec.)	
Borderlands 3	PlayStation 4	September 13, 2019	Gearbox Software	
Borderlands 3	Xbox One	September 13, 2019	Gearbox Software	
Borderlands 2 VR	HTC Vive	October 22, 2019	Gearbox Software	
Borderlands 2 VR	Oculus Rift	October 22, 2019	Gearbox Software	
WWE 2K20	Microsoft Windows	October 22, 2019	Visual Concepts / HB Studios / Saber Interactive	
WWE 2K20	PlayStation 4	October 22, 2019	Visual Concepts / HB Studios / Saber Interactive	
WWE 2K20	Xbox One	October 22, 2019	Visual Concepts / HB Studios / Saber Interactive	
WWE SuperCard - Season 6	Android	November 14, 2019	Cat Daddy Games	
WWE SuperCard - Season 6	iOS	November 14, 2019	Cat Daddy Games	
NBA 2K20	Stadia	November 19, 2019	Visual Concepts (Note: Developed by Visual Concepts Budapest, Novato and Orange County.)	
Sid Meier's Civilization VI	PlayStation 4	November 22, 2019	Aspyr	
Sid Meier's Civilization VI	Xbox One	November 22, 2019	Aspyr	
Borderlands 3	Stadia	December 17, 2019	Gearbox Software (Note: Developed by Gearbox Software Frisco and Québec.)	
XCOM: Chimera Squad	Microsoft Windows	April 24, 2020	Firaxis Games	
Mafia II: Definitive Edition	Microsoft Windows	May 19, 2020	D3T	
Mafia II: Definitive Edition	PlayStation 4	May 19, 2020	D3T	
Mafia II: Definitive Edition	Xbox One	May 19, 2020	D3T	
BioShock: The Collection	Nintendo Switch	May 29, 2020	Virtuos	
Borderlands Legendary Collection	Nintendo Switch	May 29, 2020	Turn Me Up Games	
XCOM 2 Collection	Nintendo Switch	May 29, 2020	Firaxis Games / Virtuos	
PGA Tour 2K21	Microsoft Windows	August 21, 2020	HB Studios	
PGA Tour 2K21	Nintendo Switch	August 21, 2020	Illogika	
PGA Tour 2K21	PlayStation 4	August 21, 2020	HB Studios	
PGA Tour 2K21	Stadia	August 21, 2020	HB Studios	
PGA Tour 2K21	Xbox One	August 21, 2020	HB Studios	
MyNBA 2K21	Android	August 24, 2020	Koolhaus Games / Cat Daddy Games	
MyNBA 2K21	iOS	August 24, 2020	Koolhaus Games / Cat Daddy Games	
NBA 2K21	Microsoft Windows	September 4, 2020	Visual Concepts (Note: Developed by Visual Concepts Budapest, Novato and Orange County.)	
NBA 2K21	Nintendo Switch	September 4, 2020	Visual Concepts	
NBA 2K21	PlayStation 4	September 4, 2020	Visual Concepts	
NBA 2K21	Stadia	September 4, 2020	Visual Concepts	
NBA 2K21	Xbox One	September 4, 2020	Visual Concepts	
WWE 2K Battlegrounds	Microsoft Windows	September 18, 2020	Saber Interactive Madrid	
WWE 2K Battlegrounds	Nintendo Switch	September 18, 2020	Saber Interactive Madrid	
WWE 2K Battlegrounds	PlayStation 4	September 18, 2020	Saber Interactive Madrid	
WWE 2K Battlegrounds	Stadia	September 18, 2020	Saber Interactive Madrid	
WWE 2K Battlegrounds	Xbox One	September 18, 2020	Saber Interactive Madrid	
Mafia: Definitive Edition	Microsoft Windows	September 25, 2020	Hangar 13 (Note: Developed by Hangar 13 Brighton, Brno and Novato.) / Climax Studios / Snappers Systems	
Mafia: Definitive Edition	PlayStation 4	September 25, 2020	Hangar 13 / Climax Studios / Snappers Systems	
Mafia: Definitive Edition	Xbox One	September 25, 2020	Hangar 13 / Climax Studios / Snappers Systems	
Borderlands 3	Xbox Series X/S	November 10, 2020	Gearbox Software (Note: Developed by Gearbox Software Frisco and Québec.)	
NBA 2K21	Xbox Series X/S	November 10, 2020	Visual Concepts (Note: Developed by Visual Concepts Budapest, Novato and Orange County.)	
Borderlands 3	PlayStation 5	November 12, 2020	Gearbox Software (Note: Developed by Gearbox Software Frisco and Québec.)	
NBA 2K21	PlayStation 5	November 12, 2020	Visual Concepts (Note: Developed by Visual Concepts Budapest, Novato and Orange County.)	
WWE SuperCard - Season 7	Amazon Appstore	November 18, 2020	Cat Daddy Games	
WWE SuperCard - Season 7	Android	November 18, 2020	Cat Daddy Games	
WWE SuperCard - Season 7	Facebook Gaming	November 18, 2020	Cat Daddy Games	
WWE SuperCard - Season 7	iOS	November 18, 2020	Cat Daddy Games	
Carnival Games	Microsoft Windows	November 19, 2020	Mass Media Games	
NBA 2K Mobile - Season 3	Android	December 1, 2020	Cat Daddy Games	
NBA 2K Mobile - Season 3	iOS	December 1, 2020	Cat Daddy Games	
NBA SuperCard	Android	December 10, 2020	Koolhaus Games / Cat Daddy Games	
NBA SuperCard	iOS	December 10, 2020	Koolhaus Games / Cat Daddy Games	
NBA 2K21: Arcade Edition	Apple Arcade	April 2, 2021	Visual Concepts	
NBA 2K22	Microsoft Windows	September 10, 2021	Visual Concepts (Note: Developed by Visual Concepts Austin, BlueShift, Budapest, Novato and South.)	
NBA 2K22	Nintendo Switch	September 10, 2021	Visual Concepts	
NBA 2K22	PlayStation 4	September 10, 2021	Visual Concepts	
NBA 2K22	PlayStation 5	September 10, 2021	Visual Concepts	
NBA 2K22	Xbox One	September 10, 2021	Visual Concepts	
NBA 2K22	Xbox Series X/S	September 10, 2021	Visual Concepts	
Mafia III: Definitive Edition	Stadia	October 1, 2021	Red Kite Games	
NBA 2K22: Arcade Edition	Apple Arcade	October 19, 2021	Visual Concepts	
WWE 2K22	Microsoft Windows	March 11, 2022	Visual Concepts / HB Studios / Lost Boys Interactive / Leviathan Games	
WWE 2K22	PlayStation 4	March 11, 2022	Visual Concepts / HB Studios / Lost Boys Interactive / Leviathan Games	
WWE 2K22	PlayStation 5	March 11, 2022	Visual Concepts / HB Studios / Lost Boys Interactive / Leviathan Games	
WWE 2K22	Xbox One	March 11, 2022	Visual Concepts / HB Studios / Lost Boys Interactive / Leviathan Games	
WWE 2K22	Xbox Series X/S	March 11, 2022	Visual Concepts / HB Studios / Lost Boys Interactive / Leviathan Games	
Tiny Tina's Wonderlands	Microsoft Windows	March 25, 2022	Gearbox Software (Note: Developed by Gearbox Software Frisco, Montréal and Québec.)	
Tiny Tina's Wonderlands	PlayStation 4	March 25, 2022	Gearbox Software	
Tiny Tina's Wonderlands	PlayStation 5	March 25, 2022	Gearbox Software	
Tiny Tina's Wonderlands	Xbox One	March 25, 2022	Gearbox Software	
Tiny Tina's Wonderlands	Xbox Series X/S	March 25, 2022	Gearbox Software	
The Quarry	Microsoft Windows	June 10, 2022	Supermassive Games	
The Quarry	PlayStation 4	June 10, 2022	Supermassive Games	
The Quarry	PlayStation 5	June 10, 2022	Supermassive Games	
The Quarry	Xbox One	June 10, 2022	Supermassive Games	
The Quarry	Xbox Series X/S	June 10, 2022	Supermassive Games	
NBA 2K23	Microsoft Windows	September 9, 2022	Visual Concepts	
NBA 2K23	Nintendo Switch	September 9, 2022	Visual Concepts	
NBA 2K23	PlayStation 4	September 9, 2022	Visual Concepts	
NBA 2K23	PlayStation 5	September 9, 2022	Visual Concepts	
NBA 2K23	Xbox One	September 9, 2022	Visual Concepts	
NBA 2K23	Xbox Series X/S	September 9, 2022	Visual Concepts	
PGA Tour 2K23	Microsoft Windows	October 14, 2022	HB Studios	
PGA Tour 2K23	PlayStation 4	October 14, 2022	HB Studios	
PGA Tour 2K23	PlayStation 5	October 14, 2022	HB Studios	
PGA Tour 2K23	Xbox One	October 14, 2022	HB Studios	
PGA Tour 2K23	Xbox Series X/S	October 14, 2022	HB Studios	
New Tales from the Borderlands	Microsoft Windows	October 21, 2022	Gearbox Software Quebec	
New Tales from the Borderlands	Nintendo Switch	October 21, 2022	Gearbox Software Quebec	
New Tales from the Borderlands	PlayStation 4	October 21, 2022	Gearbox Software Quebec	
New Tales from the Borderlands	PlayStation 5	October 21, 2022	Gearbox Software Quebec	
New Tales from the Borderlands	Xbox One	October 21, 2022	Gearbox Software Quebec	
New Tales from the Borderlands	Xbox Series X/S	October 21, 2022	Gearbox Software Quebec	
Marvel's Midnight Suns	Microsoft Windows	December 2, 2022	Firaxis Games	
Marvel's Midnight Suns	PlayStation 4	December 2, 2022	Firaxis Games	
Marvel's Midnight Suns	PlayStation 5	December 2, 2022	Firaxis Games	
Marvel's Midnight Suns	Xbox One	December 2, 2022	Firaxis Games	
Marvel's Midnight Suns	Xbox Series X/S	December 2, 2022	Firaxis Games	
WWE 2K23	Microsoft Windows	March 17, 2023	Visual Concepts	
WWE 2K23	PlayStation 4	March 17, 2023	Visual Concepts	
WWE 2K23	PlayStation 5	March 17, 2023	Visual Concepts	
WWE 2K23	Xbox One	March 17, 2023	Visual Concepts	
WWE 2K23	Xbox Series X/S	March 17, 2023	Visual Concepts	
Lego 2K Drive	Microsoft Windows	May 19, 2023	Visual Concepts	
Lego 2K Drive	Nintendo Switch	May 19, 2023	Visual Concepts	
Lego 2K Drive	PlayStation 4	May 19, 2023	Visual Concepts	
Lego 2K Drive	PlayStation 5	May 19, 2023	Visual Concepts	
Lego 2K Drive	Xbox One	May 19, 2023	Visual Concepts	
Lego 2K Drive	Xbox Series X/S	May 19, 2023	Visual Concepts	
NBA 2K24	Microsoft Windows	September 8, 2023	Visual Concepts	
NBA 2K24	Nintendo Switch	September 8, 2023	Visual Concepts	
NBA 2K24	PlayStation 4	September 8, 2023	Visual Concepts	
NBA 2K24	PlayStation 5	September 8, 2023	Visual Concepts	
NBA 2K24	Xbox One	September 8, 2023	Visual Concepts	
NBA 2K24	Xbox Series X/S	September 8, 2023	Visual Concepts	
WWE 2K24	Microsoft Windows	March 8, 2024	Visual Concepts	
WWE 2K24	PlayStation 4	March 8, 2024	Visual Concepts	
WWE 2K24	PlayStation 5	March 8, 2024	Visual Concepts	
WWE 2K24	Xbox One	March 8, 2024	Visual Concepts	
WWE 2K24	Xbox Series X/S	March 8, 2024	Visual Concepts	
TopSpin 2K25	Microsoft Windows	April 26, 2024	Hangar 13	
TopSpin 2K25	PlayStation 4	April 26, 2024	Hangar 13	
TopSpin 2K25	PlayStation 5	April 26, 2024	Hangar 13	
TopSpin 2K25	Xbox One	April 26, 2024	Hangar 13	
TopSpin 2K25	Xbox Series X/S	April 26, 2024	Hangar 13	
NBA 2K25	Microsoft Windows	September 6, 2024	Visual Concepts	
NBA 2K25	Nintendo Switch	September 6, 2024	Visual Concepts	
NBA 2K25	PlayStation 4	September 6, 2024	Visual Concepts	
NBA 2K25	PlayStation 5	September 6, 2024	Visual Concepts	
NBA 2K25	Xbox One	September 6, 2024	Visual Concepts	
NBA 2K25	Xbox Series X/S	September 6, 2024	Visual Concepts	
WWE 2K25	Microsoft Windows	March 14, 2025	Visual Concepts	
WWE 2K25	PlayStation 4	March 14, 2025	Visual Concepts	
WWE 2K25	PlayStation 5	March 14, 2025	Visual Concepts	
WWE 2K25	Xbox One	March 14, 2025	Visual Concepts	
WWE 2K25	Xbox Series X/S	March 14, 2025	Visual Concepts	
Mafia: The Old Country	Microsoft Windows	August 8, 2025	Hangar 13	
Mafia: The Old Country	PlayStation 5	August 8, 2025	Hangar 13	
Mafia: The Old Country	Xbox Series X/S	August 8, 2025	Hangar 13	
NBA 2K26	Microsoft Windows	September 5, 2025	Visual Concepts	
NBA 2K26	Nintendo Switch	September 5, 2025	Visual Concepts	
NBA 2K26	PlayStation 4	September 5, 2025	Visual Concepts	
NBA 2K26	PlayStation 5	September 5, 2025	Visual Concepts	
NBA 2K26	Xbox One	September 5, 2025	Visual Concepts	
NBA 2K26	Xbox Series X/S	September 5, 2025	Visual Concepts	
Sid Meier's Civilization VII	Microsoft Windows	February 11, 2025	Firaxis Games	
Borderlands 4	Microsoft Windows	September 12, 2025	Gearbox Software	
Borderlands 4	PlayStation 5	September 12, 2025	Gearbox Software	
Borderlands 4	Xbox Series X/S	September 12, 2025	Gearbox Software	
WWE 2K26	Microsoft Windows	March 12, 2026	Visual Concepts	
WWE 2K26	Nintendo Switch 2	March 12, 2026	Visual Concepts	
WWE 2K26	PlayStation 5	March 12, 2026	Visual Concepts	
WWE 2K26	Xbox Series X/S	March 12, 2026	Visual Concepts	
NBA 2K27	Microsoft Windows	September 4, 2026	Visual Concepts	
NBA 2K27	Nintendo Switch 2	September 4, 2026	Visual Concepts	
NBA 2K27	PlayStation 5	September 4, 2026	Visual Concepts	
NBA 2K27	Xbox Series X/S	September 4, 2026	Visual Concepts	
Project Ethos	TBA	TBA	31st Union	
Untitled BioShock game	TBA	TBA	Cloud Chamber	
Untitled NFL 2K arcade game	TBA	TBA	TBA	

== Expansion packs ==
Title	Platform(s)	Release date	Developer(s)	Ref.
Sid Meier's Civilization IV: Warlords	Microsoft Windows	July 24, 2006	Firaxis Games / 2K China	
Dungeon Siege II: Broken World	Microsoft Windows	August 4, 2006	Gas Powered Games	
The Elder Scrolls IV: Shivering Isles	Microsoft Windows	March 26, 2007	Bethesda Game Studios	
The Elder Scrolls IV: Shivering Isles	Xbox 360	March 26, 2007	Bethesda Game Studios	
Sid Meier's Civilization IV: Beyond the Sword	Microsoft Windows	July 23, 2007	Firaxis Games / 2K China	
The Elder Scrolls IV: Shivering Isles	PlayStation 3	November 20, 2007	Bethesda Game Studios	
Sid Meier's Civilization IV: Colonization	Microsoft Windows	September 21, 2008	Firaxis Games / 2K China	
Borderlands: The Zombie Island of Dr. Ned	PlayStation 3	November 24, 2009	Gearbox Software	
Borderlands: The Zombie Island of Dr. Ned	Xbox 360	November 24, 2009	Gearbox Software	
Borderlands: The Zombie Island of Dr. Ned	Microsoft Windows	December 9, 2009	Gearbox Software	
Borderlands: Mad Moxxi's Underdome Riot	Xbox 360	December 29, 2009	Gearbox Software	
Borderlands: Mad Moxxi's Underdome Riot	Microsoft Windows	January 7, 2010	Gearbox Software	
Borderlands: Mad Moxxi's Underdome Riot	PlayStation 3	January 7, 2010	Gearbox Software	
Borderlands: The Secret Armory of General Knoxx	Xbox 360	February 23, 2010	Gearbox Software	
Borderlands: The Secret Armory of General Knoxx	Microsoft Windows	February 25, 2010	Gearbox Software	
Borderlands: The Secret Armory of General Knoxx	PlayStation 3	February 25, 2010	Gearbox Software	
Mafia II: The Betrayal of Jimmy	PlayStation 3	August 24, 2010	2K Czech	
BioShock 2: Minerva's Den	PlayStation 3	August 31, 2010	2K Marin (Note: Developed by both the Novato, California and Canberra, Australia offices.) / 2K China	
BioShock 2: Minerva's Den	Xbox 360	August 31, 2010	2K Marin / 2K China	
Mafia II: Jimmy's Vendetta	Microsoft Windows	September 7, 2010	2K Czech	
Mafia II: Jimmy's Vendetta	PlayStation 3	September 7, 2010	2K Czech	
Mafia II: Jimmy's Vendetta	Xbox 360	September 7, 2010	2K Czech	
Borderlands: Claptrap's New Robot Revolution	Microsoft Windows	September 28, 2010	Darkside Game Studios / Gearbox Software	
Borderlands: Claptrap's New Robot Revolution	PlayStation 3	September 28, 2010	Darkside Game Studios / Gearbox Software	
Borderlands: Claptrap's New Robot Revolution	Xbox 360	September 28, 2010	Darkside Game Studios / Gearbox Software	
Mafia II: Joe's Adventures	Microsoft Windows	November 23, 2010	2K Czech	
Mafia II: Joe's Adventures	PlayStation 3	November 23, 2010	2K Czech	
Mafia II: Joe's Adventures	Xbox 360	November 23, 2010	2K Czech	
Mafia II: The Betrayal of Jimmy	Microsoft Windows	December 15, 2010	2K Czech	
Mafia II: The Betrayal of Jimmy	Xbox 360	December 15, 2010	2K Czech	
BioShock 2: Minerva's Den	Microsoft Windows	May 2, 2011	2K Marin / 2K China	
Duke Nukem Forever: The Doctor Who Cloned Me	Microsoft Windows	December 13, 2011	Triptych Games / Gearbox Software	
Duke Nukem Forever: The Doctor Who Cloned Me	PlayStation 3	December 13, 2011	Triptych Games / Piranha Games / Gearbox Software	
Duke Nukem Forever: The Doctor Who Cloned Me	Xbox 360	December 13, 2011	Triptych Games / Piranha Games / Gearbox Software	
Sid Meier's Civilization V: Gods & Kings	Microsoft Windows	June 19, 2012	Firaxis Games / 2K Shanghai	
Borderlands 2: Captain Scarlett and Her Pirate's Booty	Microsoft Windows	October 16, 2012	Gearbox Software	
Borderlands 2: Captain Scarlett and Her Pirate's Booty	PlayStation 3	October 16, 2012	Gearbox Software	
Borderlands 2: Captain Scarlett and Her Pirate's Booty	Xbox 360	October 16, 2012	Gearbox Software	
Borderlands 2: Mr. Torgue's Campaign of Carnage	Microsoft Windows	November 20, 2012	The Workshop / Gearbox Software	
Borderlands 2: Mr. Torgue's Campaign of Carnage	PlayStation 3	November 20, 2012	The Workshop / Gearbox Software	
Borderlands 2: Mr. Torgue's Campaign of Carnage	Xbox 360	November 20, 2012	The Workshop / Gearbox Software	
XCOM: Enemy Unknown – Slingshot	Microsoft Windows	December 4, 2012	Firaxis Games	
XCOM: Enemy Unknown – Slingshot	PlayStation 3	December 4, 2012	Firaxis Games	
XCOM: Enemy Unknown – Slingshot	Xbox 360	December 4, 2012	Firaxis Games	
Borderlands 2: Sir Hammerlock's Big Game Hunt	Microsoft Windows	January 15, 2013	Gearbox Software	
Borderlands 2: Sir Hammerlock's Big Game Hunt	PlayStation 3	January 15, 2013	Gearbox Software	
Borderlands 2: Sir Hammerlock's Big Game Hunt	Xbox 360	January 15, 2013	Gearbox Software	
Borderlands 2: Tiny Tina's Assault on Dragon Keep	Microsoft Windows	June 25, 2013	Gearbox Software	
Borderlands 2: Tiny Tina's Assault on Dragon Keep	PlayStation 3	June 25, 2013	Gearbox Software	
Borderlands 2: Tiny Tina's Assault on Dragon Keep	Xbox 360	June 25, 2013	Gearbox Software	
Sid Meier's Civilization V: Brave New World	Microsoft Windows	July 9, 2013	Firaxis Games / 2K China	
The Bureau: XCOM Declassified – Hangar 6: R&D	Xbox 360	October 8, 2013	2K Marin	
The Bureau: XCOM Declassified – Codebreakers	Microsoft Windows	October 15, 2013	2K Marin	
The Bureau: XCOM Declassified – Codebreakers	PlayStation 3	October 15, 2013	2K Marin	
The Bureau: XCOM Declassified – Codebreakers	Xbox 360	October 15, 2013	2K Marin	
Sid Meier's Ace Patrol: Pacific Skies	Microsoft Windows	November 5, 2013	Firaxis Games	
Sid Meier's Ace Patrol: Pacific Skies	iOS	November 7, 2013	Firaxis Games	
BioShock Infinite: Burial at Sea – Episode One	Microsoft Windows	November 12, 2013	Irrational Games	
BioShock Infinite: Burial at Sea – Episode One	PlayStation 3	November 12, 2013	Irrational Games	
BioShock Infinite: Burial at Sea – Episode One	Xbox 360	November 12, 2013	Irrational Games	
XCOM: Enemy Within	Microsoft Windows	November 12, 2013	Firaxis Games	
XCOM: Enemy Within – Commander Edition	PlayStation 3	November 12, 2013	Firaxis Games	
XCOM: Enemy Within – Commander Edition	Xbox 360	November 12, 2013	Firaxis Games	
The Bureau: XCOM Declassified – Hangar 6: R&D	Microsoft Windows	November 19, 2013	2K Marin	
The Bureau: XCOM Declassified – Hangar 6: R&D	PlayStation 3	November 19, 2013	2K Marin	
BioShock Infinite: Burial at Sea – Episode Two	Microsoft Windows	March 25, 2014	Irrational Games	
BioShock Infinite: Burial at Sea – Episode Two	PlayStation 3	March 25, 2014	Irrational Games	
BioShock Infinite: Burial at Sea – Episode Two	Xbox 360	March 25, 2014	Irrational Games	
XCOM: Enemy Within	Android	November 13, 2014	Virtuos / 2K China	
XCOM: Enemy Within	Fire OS	November 13, 2014	Virtuos / 2K China	
XCOM: Enemy Within	iOS	November 13, 2014	Virtuos / 2K China	
Borderlands: The Pre-Sequel! – Claptastic Voyage and Ultimate Vault Hunter Upgrade Pack 2	Microsoft Windows	March 24, 2015	2K Australia / Gearbox Software	
Borderlands: The Pre-Sequel! – Claptastic Voyage and Ultimate Vault Hunter Upgrade Pack 2	PlayStation 3	March 24, 2015	2K Australia / Gearbox Software	
Borderlands: The Pre-Sequel! – Claptastic Voyage and Ultimate Vault Hunter Upgrade Pack 2	Xbox 360	March 24, 2015	2K Australia / Gearbox Software	
Sid Meier's Civilization: Beyond Earth – Rising Tide	Microsoft Windows	October 9, 2015	Firaxis Games	
XCOM 2: Shen's Last Gift	Microsoft Windows	June 30, 2016	Firaxis Games	
BioShock 2: Minerva's Den Remastered	Microsoft Windows	September 15, 2016	Blind Squirrel Games	
XCOM 2: Alien Hunters	PlayStation 4	September 27, 2016	Firaxis Games / Blind Squirrel Games	
XCOM 2: Alien Hunters	Xbox One	September 27, 2016	Firaxis Games / Blind Squirrel Games	
XCOM 2: Shen's Last Gift	PlayStation 4	September 27, 2016	Firaxis Games / Blind Squirrel Games	
XCOM 2: Shen's Last Gift	Xbox One	September 27, 2016	Firaxis Games / Blind Squirrel Games	
Battleborn: Attikus and the Thrall Rebellion	Microsoft Windows	October 13, 2016	Gearbox Software	
Battleborn: Attikus and the Thrall Rebellion	PlayStation 4	October 13, 2016	Gearbox Software	
Battleborn: Attikus and the Thrall Rebellion	Xbox One	October 13, 2016	Gearbox Software	
Battleborn: Toby's Friendship Raid	Microsoft Windows	November 9, 2016	Gearbox Software	
Battleborn: Toby's Friendship Raid	PlayStation 4	November 9, 2016	Gearbox Software	
Battleborn: Toby's Friendship Raid	Xbox One	November 9, 2016	Gearbox Software	
Battleborn: Oscar Mike vs. The Battle School	Microsoft Windows	January 19, 2017	Gearbox Software	
Battleborn: Oscar Mike vs. The Battle School	PlayStation 4	January 19, 2017	Gearbox Software	
Battleborn: Oscar Mike vs. The Battle School	Xbox One	January 19, 2017	Gearbox Software	
Battleborn: Montana and the Demon Bear	Microsoft Windows	February 2, 2017	Gearbox Software	
Battleborn: Montana and the Demon Bear	PlayStation 4	February 2, 2017	Gearbox Software	
Battleborn: Montana and the Demon Bear	Xbox One	February 2, 2017	Gearbox Software	
Battleborn: Phoebe and the Heart of Ekkunar	Microsoft Windows	February 23, 2017	Gearbox Software	
Battleborn: Phoebe and the Heart of Ekkunar	PlayStation 4	February 23, 2017	Gearbox Software	
Battleborn: Phoebe and the Heart of Ekkunar	Xbox One	February 23, 2017	Gearbox Software	
Mafia III: Faster, Baby!	Microsoft Windows	March 28, 2017	Hangar 13 / 2K Czech	
Mafia III: Faster, Baby!	PlayStation 4	March 28, 2017	Hangar 13 / 2K Czech	
Mafia III: Faster, Baby!	Xbox One	March 28, 2017	Hangar 13 / 2K Czech	
Mafia III: Stones Unturned	Microsoft Windows	May 30, 2017	Hangar 13 / 2K Czech	
Mafia III: Stones Unturned	PlayStation 4	May 30, 2017	Hangar 13 / 2K Czech	
Mafia III: Stones Unturned	Xbox One	May 30, 2017	Hangar 13 / 2K Czech	
Mafia III: Sign of the Times	Microsoft Windows	July 25, 2017	Hangar 13 (Note: Developed by Hangar 13 Brno, Novato and Prague.)	
Mafia III: Sign of the Times	PlayStation 4	July 25, 2017	Hangar 13	
Mafia III: Sign of the Times	Xbox One	July 25, 2017	Hangar 13	
XCOM 2: War of the Chosen – Propaganda Center	Microsoft Windows	August 15, 2017	Firaxis Games	
XCOM 2: War of the Chosen	Microsoft Windows	August 29, 2017	Firaxis Games	
XCOM 2: War of the Chosen	PlayStation 4	September 12, 2017	Firaxis Games / Blind Squirrel Games / Mass Media Games	
XCOM 2: War of the Chosen	Xbox One	September 12, 2017	Firaxis Games / Blind Squirrel Games / Mass Media Games	
Carnival Games VR: Alley Adventure	HTC Vive	November 14, 2017	Cat Daddy Games	
Carnival Games VR: Alley Adventure	Oculus Rift	November 14, 2017	Cat Daddy Games	
Carnival Games VR: Alley Adventure	PlayStation VR	November 14, 2017	Cat Daddy Games	
Carnival Games VR: Alley Adventure	Samsung Gear VR	November 14, 2017	Cat Daddy Games	
Sid Meier's Civilization VI: Rise & Fall	Microsoft Windows	February 8, 2018	Firaxis Games	
XCOM 2: War of the Chosen – Tactical Legacy Pack	Microsoft Windows	October 9, 2018	Firaxis Games	
Sid Meier's Civilization VI: Gathering Storm	Microsoft Windows	February 14, 2019	Firaxis Games	
Borderlands 2: Commander Lilith & The Fight for Sanctuary	Microsoft Windows	June 9, 2019	Gearbox Software (Note: Developed by Gearbox Software Frisco and Québec.)	
Borderlands 2: Commander Lilith & The Fight for Sanctuary	PlayStation 4	June 9, 2019	Gearbox Software	
Borderlands 2: Commander Lilith & The Fight for Sanctuary	Xbox One	June 9, 2019	Gearbox Software	
Borderlands 2 VR: BAMF DLC Pack	PlayStation VR	September 6, 2019	Gearbox Software	
Borderlands 2 VR: BAMF DLC Pack	HTC Vive	October 22, 2019	Gearbox Software	
Borderlands 2 VR: BAMF DLC Pack	Oculus Rift	October 22, 2019	Gearbox Software	
WWE 2K20: Bump in the Night	Microsoft Windows	October 28, 2019	Visual Concepts	
WWE 2K20: Bump in the Night	PlayStation 4	October 28, 2019	Visual Concepts	
WWE 2K20: Bump in the Night	Xbox One	October 28, 2019	Visual Concepts	
Sid Meier's Civilization VI: Expansion Bundle	Nintendo Switch	November 22, 2019	Aspyr	
Sid Meier's Civilization VI: Expansion Bundle	PlayStation 4	November 22, 2019	Aspyr	
Sid Meier's Civilization VI: Expansion Bundle	Xbox One	November 22, 2019	Aspyr	
Borderlands 3: Moxxi’s Heist of The Handsome Jackpot	Microsoft Windows	December 19, 2019	Gearbox Software (Note: Developed by Gearbox Software Frisco and Québec.)	
Borderlands 3: Moxxi’s Heist of The Handsome Jackpot	PlayStation 4	December 19, 2019	Gearbox Software	
Borderlands 3: Moxxi’s Heist of The Handsome Jackpot	Xbox One	December 19, 2019	Gearbox Software	
WWE 2K20: Wasteland Wanderers	Microsoft Windows	December 20, 2019	Visual Concepts	
WWE 2K20: Wasteland Wanderers	PlayStation 4	December 20, 2019	Visual Concepts	
WWE 2K20: Wasteland Wanderers	Xbox One	December 20, 2019	Visual Concepts	
WWE 2K20: Southpaw Regional Wrestling	Microsoft Windows	February 7, 2020	Visual Concepts	
WWE 2K20: Southpaw Regional Wrestling	PlayStation 4	February 7, 2020	Visual Concepts	
WWE 2K20: Southpaw Regional Wrestling	Xbox One	February 7, 2020	Visual Concepts	
WWE 2K20: Empire of Tomorrow	Microsoft Windows	March 13, 2020	Visual Concepts	
WWE 2K20: Empire of Tomorrow	PlayStation 4	March 13, 2020	Visual Concepts	
WWE 2K20: Empire of Tomorrow	Xbox One	March 13, 2020	Visual Concepts	
Borderlands 3: Guns, Love, and Tentacles - The Marriage of Wainwright & Hammerlock	Microsoft Windows	March 26, 2020	Gearbox Software (Note: Developed by Gearbox Software Frisco and Québec.)	
Borderlands 3: Guns, Love, and Tentacles - The Marriage of Wainwright & Hammerlock	PlayStation 4	March 26, 2020	Gearbox Software	
Borderlands 3: Guns, Love, and Tentacles - The Marriage of Wainwright & Hammerlock	Xbox One	March 26, 2020	Gearbox Software	
Borderlands 3: Bounty of Blood - A Fistful of Redemption	Microsoft Windows	June 26, 2020	Gearbox Software	
Borderlands 3: Bounty of Blood - A Fistful of Redemption	PlayStation 4	June 26, 2020	Gearbox Software	
Borderlands 3: Bounty of Blood - A Fistful of Redemption	Xbox One	June 26, 2020	Gearbox Software	
Borderlands 3: Psycho Krieg and the Fantastic Fustercluck	Microsoft Windows	September 10, 2020	Gearbox Software	
Borderlands 3: Psycho Krieg and the Fantastic Fustercluck	PlayStation 4	September 10, 2020	Gearbox Software	
Borderlands 3: Psycho Krieg and the Fantastic Fustercluck	Xbox One	September 10, 2020	Gearbox Software	
Borderlands 3: Bounty of Blood - A Fistful of Redemption	Xbox Series X/S	November 10, 2021	Gearbox Software	
Borderlands 3: Guns, Love, and Tentacles - The Marriage of Wainwright & Hammerlock	Xbox Series X/S	November 10, 2021	Gearbox Software	
Borderlands 3: Moxxi’s Heist of The Handsome Jackpot	Xbox Series X/S	November 10, 2021	Gearbox Software	
Borderlands 3: Psycho Krieg and the Fantastic Fustercluck	Xbox Series X/S	November 10, 2021	Gearbox Software	
Borderlands 3: Bounty of Blood - A Fistful of Redemption	PlayStation 5	November 12, 2021	Gearbox Software	
Borderlands 3: Guns, Love, and Tentacles - The Marriage of Wainwright & Hammerlock	PlayStation 5	November 12, 2021	Gearbox Software	
Borderlands 3: Moxxi’s Heist of The Handsome Jackpot	PlayStation 5	November 12, 2021	Gearbox Software	
Borderlands 3: Psycho Krieg and the Fantastic Fustercluck	PlayStation 5	November 12, 2021	Gearbox Software	
Tiny Tina's Wonderlands: Coiled Captors	Microsoft Windows	April 21, 2022	Gearbox Software	
Tiny Tina's Wonderlands: Coiled Captors	PlayStation 4	April 21, 2022	Gearbox Software	
Tiny Tina's Wonderlands: Coiled Captors	PlayStation 5	April 21, 2022	Gearbox Software	
Tiny Tina's Wonderlands: Coiled Captors	Xbox One	April 21, 2022	Gearbox Software	
Tiny Tina's Wonderlands: Coiled Captors	Xbox Series X/S	April 21, 2022	Gearbox Software	

== Games re-released ==
Title	Platform(s)	Release date	Developer(s)	Ref.
X-COM: Terror from the Deep	Microsoft Windows	May 4, 2007	MicroProse	
X-COM: Apocalypse	Microsoft Windows	September 4, 2008	Mythos Games	
X-COM: Enforcer	Microsoft Windows	September 4, 2008	MicroProse	
X-COM: Interceptor	Microsoft Windows	September 4, 2008	MicroProse	
X-COM: UFO Defense	Microsoft Windows	September 4, 2008	Mythos Games	
Freedom Force	Microsoft Windows	May 29, 2009	Irrational Games Australia / Irrational Games	
Freedom Force vs The 3rd Reich	Microsoft Windows	May 29, 2009	Irrational Games Australia / Irrational Games	
Army Men	Microsoft Windows	September 8, 2016	The 3DO Company	
Army Men II	Microsoft Windows	September 8, 2016	The 3DO Company	
Army Men: "Toys in Space"	Microsoft Windows	September 8, 2016	The 3DO Company	
Army Men: RTS	Microsoft Windows	March 26, 2002	Pandemic Studios	
Army Men: World War	Microsoft Windows	April 3, 2000	The 3DO Company	
