= 2K China =

Chinese video game developer

2K Games (Shanghai) Co., Ltd.
- Company type: Subsidiary
- Industry: Video games
- Founded: 9 May 2006; 18 years ago
- Defunct: 6 November 2015
- Fate: Dissolved
- Headquarters: Shanghai, China
- Number of locations: 3 studios (2015)
- Number of employees: 150 (2015)
- Parent: 2K

2K Games (Shanghai) Co., Ltd., doing business as 2K China (formerly 2K Shanghai), was a Chinese video game developer based in Shanghai.

== History ==
2K Shanghai was founded as a subsidiary of 2K on 9 May 2006, in response to China's rapidly growing gaming market. Initial projects for the company included doing Chinese localisation for Civilization IV, developing an original intellectual property, and "serve as a hub for sales, marketing, development and outsourcing opportunities in China".

On 6 November 2015, 2K's parent company, Take-Two Interactive, announced that they had closed down 2K China due to profitability concerns over their in-development title Borderlands Online. Due to the closure, Borderlands Online was effectively cancelled. 150 people were made redundant at 2K China and its Hangzhou studio, while the Chengdu studio, as 2K Chengdu, was retained as a quality assurance facility.

== Games developed ==
Year	Title	Platform(s)	Notes
2006	Sid Meier's Civilization IV: Warlords	Microsoft Windows	Assisted Firaxis Games
2006	Sid Meier's Railroads!	Microsoft Windows	Assisted Firaxis Games
2007	Sid Meier's Civilization IV: Beyond the Sword	Microsoft Windows	Assisted Firaxis Games
2008	Don King Presents: Prizefighter	Xbox 360	Assisted Venom Games
2008	Major League Baseball 2K8	Wii	
2008	Sid Meier's Civilization IV: Colonization	Microsoft Windows	Assisted Firaxis Games
2008	Sid Meier's Civilization Revolution	Nintendo DS	Assisted Firaxis Games
2008	Sid Meier's Civilization Revolution	PlayStation 3	Assisted Firaxis Games
2008	Sid Meier's Civilization Revolution	Xbox 360	Assisted Firaxis Games
2008	Top Spin 3	Nintendo DS	
2008	Top Spin 3	Wii	
2009	Don King Boxing	Nintendo DS	
2009	Don King Boxing	Wii	
2009	Major League Baseball 2K9	PlayStation Portable	
2009	Major League Baseball 2K9	Wii	
2009	NBA 2K10	PlayStation Portable	
2009	Sid Meier's Civilization Revolution	iOS	
2010	BioShock 2	Microsoft Windows	Assisted 2K Marin
2010	BioShock 2	PlayStation 3	Assisted 2K Marin
2010	BioShock 2	Xbox 360	Assisted 2K Marin
2010	BioShock 2: Minerva's Den	PlayStation 3	Assisted 2K Marin
2010	BioShock 2: Minerva's Den	Xbox 360	Assisted 2K Marin
2010	Carnival Games	iOS	
2010	Major League Baseball 2K10	PlayStation 2	
2010	Major League Baseball 2K10	PlayStation Portable	
2010	Major League Baseball 2K10	Wii	
2010	NBA 2K11	PlayStation Portable	
2010	NHL 2K11	iOS	
2010	Sid Meier's Civilization V	Microsoft Windows	Assisted Firaxis Games
2010	Sid Meier's Pirates!	Wii	
2010	The Misadventures of P.B. Winterbottom	Microsoft Windows	
2011	BioShock 2: Minerva's Den	Microsoft Windows	Assisted 2K Marin
2011	Carnival Games Volume II	iOS	
2011	Major League Baseball 2K11	PlayStation 2	Assisted Virtuos
2011	Major League Baseball 2K11	PlayStation Portable	Assisted Virtuos
2011	Major League Baseball 2K11	Wii	
2011	NBA 2K12	iOS	
2011	NBA 2K12	PlayStation 2	Assisted Virtuos
2011	NBA 2K12	Wii	Assisted Virtuos
2011	Sid Meier's Pirates!	iOS	
2011	Top Spin 4	PlayStation 3	Assisted 2K Czech
2011	Top Spin 4	Wii	
2011	Top Spin 4	Xbox 360	Assisted 2K Czech
2012	Major League Baseball 2K12	PlayStation 2	Assisted Virtuos
2012	Major League Baseball 2K12	PlayStation Portable	Assisted Virtuos
2012	Major League Baseball 2K12	Wii	Assisted Virtuos
2012	NBA 2K13	Android	
2012	NBA 2K13	iOS	
2012	NBA 2K13	Microsoft Windows	Assisted Visual Concepts
2012	NBA 2K13	PlayStation 3	Assisted Visual Concepts
2012	NBA 2K13	Xbox 360	Assisted Visual Concepts
2012	NBA 2K13	Wii U	Assisted Visual Concepts
2012	Sid Meier's Civilization V: Gods & Kings	Microsoft Windows	Assisted Firaxis Games
2012	Sid Meier's Civilization Revolution	Windows Phone	
2012	Sid Meier's Pirates!	Windows Phone	
2012	Spec Ops: The Line	Microsoft Windows	Assisted Yager Development
2012	Spec Ops: The Line	PlayStation 3	Assisted Yager Development
2012	Spec Ops: The Line	Xbox 360	Assisted Yager Development
2012	The Darkness II	Microsoft Windows	Assisted Digital Extremes
2012	The Darkness II	PlayStation 3	Assisted Digital Extremes
2012	The Darkness II	Xbox 360	Assisted Digital Extremes
2012	XCOM: Enemy Unknown	Microsoft Windows	Assisted Firaxis Games
2012	XCOM: Enemy Unknown	PlayStation 3	Assisted Firaxis Games
Xbox 360	XCOM: Enemy Unknown		Assisted Firaxis Games
2013	Sid Meier's Civilization V: Brave New World	Microsoft Windows	Assisted Firaxis Games
2013	The Bureau: XCOM Declassified	Microsoft Windows	Assisted 2K Marin
2013	The Bureau: XCOM Declassified	PlayStation 3	Assisted 2K Marin
2013	The Bureau: XCOM Declassified	Xbox 360	Assisted 2K Marin
2013	XCOM: Enemy Unknown	iOS	
2014	BioShock	iOS	
2014	Borderlands: The Pre-Sequel!	Microsoft Windows	Assisted 2K Australia
2014	Borderlands: The Pre-Sequel!	PlayStation 3	Assisted 2K Australia
2014	Borderlands: The Pre-Sequel!	Xbox 360	Assisted 2K Australia
2014	Sid Meier's Civilization Revolution 2	Android	
2014	Sid Meier's Civilization Revolution 2	iOS	
2014	XCOM: Enemy Unknown	Android	Assisted Virtuos
2014	XCOM: Enemy Within	Android	Assisted Virtuos
2014	XCOM: Enemy Within	Fire OS	Assisted Virtuos
2014	XCOM: Enemy Within	iOS	Assisted Virtuos
2015	Evolve	Microsoft Windows	Assisted Turtle Rock Studios
2015	Evolve	PlayStation 4	Assisted Turtle Rock Studios
2015	Evolve	Xbox One	Assisted Turtle Rock Studios
