= WB Games New York =

Video game development company

Warner Bros. Games New York
- Formerly: Agora Games, Inc. (2005–2017)
- Type: Subsidiary
- Industry: Video games
- Founded: 2005; 21 years ago
- Founder: Michael DelPrete
- Headquarters: Troy, New York, US
- Key people: Steven Flenory (VP, studio head)
- Products: Catapult Framework
- Number of employees: 23 (2017)
- Parent: Major League Gaming (2009–2017); Warner Bros. Games (2017–)
- Website: www.wbgamesny.com

Warner Bros. Games New York (formerly Agora Games, Inc.), is a video game development company based in Troy, New York that works with game developers to build online features and web-based communities for video games. Warner Bros. Games New York was founded by Michael DelPrete as Agora Studios Inc. and grew out of an RPI project. Their software game-play statistics for games including Call of Duty: World at War, Guitar Hero, and numerous other franchises.

Major League Gaming acquired Agora Games on August 18, 2009. The studio was later sold to become a development studio within Warner Bros. Interactive Entertainment (now Warner Bros. Games) in 2017, expanding its team, also rebranding to Warner Bros. Games New York within the following year. WB Games New York builds centralized online services to be used by all WB Games developers and help with the technical aspect of several games for Warner Bros. Games. Steven Flenory is the current vice president and studio head of Warner Bros. Games New York.

== Games ==
List of games co-developed by WB Games New York
Year	Title	Platform(s)	Notes
2012	Guardians of Middle-earth	PlatStation 3, Xbox 360, Windows	technical support
2013	Injustice: Gods Among Us	Windows, PlayStation 3, Xbox 360, PlayStation Vita, Wii U, PlayStation 4, IOS, Android,	Additional work and technical support
2015	Mortal Kombat X	Windows, PlayStation 4, Xbox One	Additional work, development, and techinical support
2015	Mad Max (2015 video game)	Windows, PlayStation 4, Xbox One	Additional work and development support
2017	Injustice 2	Windows, PlayStation 4, Xbox One, Android, iOS	Additional work, development, and techinical support
2017	Middle-earth: Shadow of War	Windows, PlayStation 4, Xbox One	Additional work, development, and techinical support
2019	Mortal Kombat 11	Windows, PlayStation 4, Xbox One, Nintendo Switch, Stadia	Additional work, development, and techinical support
2021	Back 4 Blood	Windows, PlayStation 4, Xbox One, PlayStation 5, Xbox Series X	Additional work, development, and techinical support
2022	Gotham Knights (video game)	Windows, PlayStation 5, Xbox Series X/S	Additional work, development, and techinical support
2023	Hogwarts Legacy	Windows, PlayStation 4, Xbox One, Nintendo Switch, PlayStation 5, Xbox Series X, Nintendo Switch 2	Additional work and development support
2023	Mortal Kombat 1	Windows, PlayStation 5, Xbox Series X, Nintendo Switch	Additional work, development, and techinical support
2024	Suicide Squad: Kill the Justice League	Windows, PlayStation 5, Xbox Series X	Additional work, development, and techinical support
2024	MultiVersus	Windows, PlayStation 4, Xbox One, PlayStation 5, Xbox Series X	Additional work, development, and techinical support
