= Carnival Games: Mini-Golf =

2008 video game

- North American Wii box art
- Developer(s): Cat Daddy Games
- Publisher(s): 2K Play
- Platform(s): Wii
- Release: NA: October 21, 2008; PAL: October 31, 2008
- Genre(s): Sports
- Mode(s): Single-player, multiplayer

Carnival Games: Mini-Golf is a sports game developed by Cat Daddy Games and published by 2K Play for Wii in 2008. It is the follow-up to the original Wii game, Carnival Games.

== Reception ==
Reception

Aggregate score
Aggregator	Score
Metacritic	38/100

Review scores
Publication	Score
Game Informer	5/10
GameSpot	3.5/10
GameZone	6.2/10
IGN	3.5/10

The game received "unfavorable" reviews according to the review aggregation website Metacritic.
