= Sid Meier's Pirates! (2004 video game) =

2004 adventure video game

- Developer: Firaxis Games (Note: Full Fat ported the game to the PlayStation Portable, Robosoft Technologies ported it to the Mac OS X, Virtuos ported the game to the Wii, while 2K China ported it to iOS and Windows Phone.)
- Publishers: Atari Interactive; 2K (after 2005); Feral Interactive (Mac OS X)
- Producer: Barry Caudill
- Designer: Sid Meier
- Programmer: Don Wuenschell
- Artists: Jerome J. Atherholt; Marc Hudgins; Dennis Moellers
- Composers: Mark Cromer; Michael Curran
- Engine: Gamebryo
- Platforms: Windows, Xbox, PlayStation Portable, Mac OS X, Wii, iOS, Windows Phone
- Release: November 22, 2004: Windows; NA: November 22, 2004; PAL: December 3, 2004; Xbox; NA: July 11, 2005; EU: July 22, 2005; AU: July 29, 2005; PlayStation Portable; NA: January 23, 2007; EU: March 9, 2007; AU: March 16, 2007; OS X; August 29, 2008; Wii; NA: September 28, 2010; PAL: October 8, 2010; iPad; July 21, 2011 (Note: Released for iPhone and iPod Touch on April 20, 2012.); Windows Phone; April 11, 2012
- Genres: Action-adventure, strategy
- Mode: Single-player

Sid Meier's Pirates! (also known as Sid Meier's Pirates!: Live the Life, or simply Pirates!) is a 2004 strategy, action and adventure video game developed by Firaxis Games. A remake of Sid Meier's earlier 1987 game of the same name, it was originally published by Atari Interactive, but in May 2005, 2K acquired the rights to the title from Atari's parent company Infogrames and later went on to publish console and handheld ports.

Overall, the gameplay remains very similar to the original game, though it features a 3D game engine (NDL's Gamebryo). Some elements like sun sighting were removed, but other features have been added, such as a ballroom dancing minigame and an improved turn-based land combat system.

The Microsoft Windows version of Pirates! was released on November 22, 2004, and was also available through the online GameTap video game service before it was shut down. The Xbox version was released on July 11, 2005, and includes some multiplayer capabilities. The Xbox version was re-released on the Xbox Live Marketplace for the Xbox 360 as an Xbox Original on February 11, 2008, since the Xbox version is on the Xbox 360 backward compatibility list in North America and Europe. A version for the PlayStation Portable was released on January 23, 2007. This new version features modified gameplay mechanisms and was developed by Full Fat in collaboration with Firaxis Games. The Mac OS X version was released in August 2008 by Feral Interactive. The Wii version was released on September 28, 2010.

A mobile version has been released by Oasys Mobile. The iPad version was released on July 21, 2011. A version for the Apple iPhone and iPod Touch was released in April 2012, published by 2K Games. In addition, the game was ported over to the Windows Phone platform in early April 2012.

== Gameplay ==
Pirates is separated into several minigames requiring different skills, as well as a "sailing map" mode where the player navigates around the Caribbean. Sailing technique, evasion (running from guards), naval gunnery, turn-based strategy, dancing with the daughter of a governor, fencing, and strategic planning are all skills needed to succeed in Pirates. The player must choose one of five different skills at the start, which the game will give them an advantage in. During the game, the player can acquire items and special crew members that make some minigames less difficult.

In the PC version, most controls are assigned to the nine keys of the number pad, and the game is completely playable using only the keyboard (numpad keys and enter), excluding the start menu and control screen. This is achieved by a visual representation of the keypad in the lower right corner of the screen, which also shows the function of each key at any given time. For example, during ship-to-ship combat, the "3", "7", and "1" keys on the numpad representation are shown with images of different cannonball types. These buttons are used to select different types of cannonballs to fire. The on-screen keypad can also be clicked with the mouse, performing the same function as the keyboard key. Though the mouse can be used for various commands, the keypad is the preferred input mechanism due to the game's mechanics.

=== Story ===
Each new game comes with a short backstory, which starts at the time the player character is still a young boy. The player character's family receives a visit from an evil Spanish nobleman, the Marquis de la Montalbán, who proceeds to enslave them all for failing to pay their debt to him. The player character manages to evade capture, vowing to avenge what Montalbán has done to his family. Ten years later, the player character, now a young adult, enters a tavern to start his journey to the Caribbean. At this point, the player must name the character, choose the difficulty level, special trait and starting era, in addition to which nation to sail with at the beginning.

Once the player completes the registration, the scene proceeds to the player character aboard a ship as he takes a voyage to the Caribbean. The voyage is harsh, and the ship captain frequently abuses his crew, causing the player character to incite a mutiny out of ill treatment. The mutiny is successful, with the captain set adrift and the player character named the new captain, making the ship his own. This marks the start of the game, with the ship immediately entering the port of a major city of the player's chosen nationality.

=== Sailing ===
Sailing scene (Windows version)

The majority of the game is spent sailing from destination to destination around the Caribbean islands. To control the ship(s), the player must use the number pad (or the directional arrows) on the keyboard. Mouse navigation is also possible, where clicking anywhere on the screen will send the ship sailing in that direction. During the sailing segment, the player navigates between areas of interest in the Caribbean, including colonies, cities, missions, pirate havens, and others. Wind conditions have an important effect on sailing, as winds tend to blow westwards (especially on lower difficulty levels) and as such speed up travels to the west while slowing down travel to the east. Clouds passing overhead indicate barometric depressions, and at the center of these depressions are storms which cause powerful winds that usually boosts sailing in any direction, but also poses a threat to ships passing underneath the storm. Unlike earlier versions, the Caribbean is filled with ships represented visually by their three-dimensional models. The player can spot these ships from a distance and even collect information about their mission, port of departure, destination, and nationality. This allows the player to select their targets, as well as actively pursue most ships if an attack is to be attempted. Unlike previous Pirates! games, however, enemy ships cannot force the player to fight, although they can bombard the player's ships en route to a destination and even sink some (but not all) of the player's ships if they bombard them long enough. Fortified cities which hold a particular grudge against the player (or whose controlling nation holds a substantial bounty over the player's head) may also open fire upon the player's fleet as it passes by. The player must also navigate around reefs and shoals, which cause hull damage to any ship that passes over them (but rarely sink ships, unlike in previous versions). Finally, if the player wishes, they may sail the ship onto the shoreline, allowing the crew to disembark and begin to march. This can be used when the player wishes to approach a hostile city without being fired upon, to attack a friendly city, or to travel on land seeking buried treasure, lost cities, or Montalban's hideout.

=== Trade and economy ===
During the course of the game, the player can acquire large amounts of resources from ships captured, including cannons, food, supplies, and trade goods. These goods have fluctuating values around the Caribbean, though most do not change much at any given time. Areas with many nearby pirate havens will pay more for cannons, isolated settlements will pay more for supplies, and may have very cheap local goods, such as spices, and so forth. This is offset by smaller villages having fewer tradeable goods and less gold than larger cities, which will also trade less under poor economic conditions and small population size. The player can also repair or upgrade ships at particular ports. These repairs depend on the player's rank and reputation in the cities' controlling government. As the player rises in rank, the repairs become cheaper, and eventually are done for free.

=== Naval battles ===
The player will encounter numerous ships while sailing, all of which can be attacked. The player must decide to start a battle, although enemy ships may open fire and begin a chase on the sailing map. The player also has the option to switch flagships, controlling which ships will engage the enemy. Sailing ships in combat is handled much the same as sailing them on the main map. The player controls a single ship and must navigate it according to the prevailing winds, the ship's specific sailing strengths, and the player's goals during the battle. Several differences do apply, mostly the inability to sail directly into the wind with most ships (which is possible, albeit slowly, on the sailing map), as well as the lack of dynamic weather (no storms, though engaging while in a storm will provide storm conditions during the entire battle). Depending on the player's ship, the enemy's ship, and various other factors, a battle may have one or more desirable outcomes in addition to the sinking of the player's ship. The most common goal in ship-to-ship combat would be the capture of the enemy vessel, either by directly boarding it and carrying the deck, or by subduing the ship by cannon fire. An enemy ship will always surrender if it is dismasted (except escort ships, which never surrender) although it may also choose to surrender if faced with a powerful boarding party compared to its own crew or if very seriously damaged. Smaller ships are suited to the former strategy (quick boarding, with little cannon fire exchanged), though some are nimble enough to evade enemy fire and win by wearing down even the most powerful warships, whose large crew makes early boarding impractical. Larger ships, especially frigates, often are more suited to subduing the enemy ship through cannon fire, due to their powerful broadsides.

Another possible outcome is the sinking of the enemy ship. After the enemy's hull has been hit enough, a shot will end up in the powder magazine, destroying the ship.

Much of the naval combat minigame consists of attempting to outmaneuver the enemy, bringing their vessel into cannon range while trying to stay out of their line of fire. The player may also attempt to board the enemy's ship as quickly as possible to avoid damage to either ship. Wind direction and specific ship capabilities are significant factors. Some ships are adept at sailing at sharp angles to the wind direction, while others can only gain reasonable speed when sailing across or with the wind. Turning speed is also different between ship types, and some ships can actually weave between cannonballs, while others turn very slowly and cannot make swift maneuvers. There is great emphasis on knowing the particular strengths and weaknesses of one's ship, and the ability to gauge wind direction continuously and act accordingly.

Automatic aiming is also applied to the shot, which may (especially in lower difficulties) cause the cannonballs to be fired at a narrower angle to the ship's heading. This automatic aiming attempts to take into account the heading and speed of the enemy ship, and often will cause a more accurate hit, although it can also be detrimental, especially against quick enemies. Cannon facing the enemy are fired in volleys. After firing, the crew begins to reload, a task which takes a certain amount of time depending on the number of cannon, the number of crew, and several other factors. Volleys can be fired even when not all cannon have been loaded, as opposed to a broadside. The largest broadside possible (24 guns) is fired by a fully armed Ship of the Line, which mounts 48 guns in total. Such a volley is often wide enough to hit the enemy regardless of his attempts to maneuver out of the way. The player needs to take into account the enemy's heading and speed when firing, as cannonballs take some time to travel the distance between the two ships and therefore cannot be fired directly at the enemy's position unless the enemy is motionless or at extremely close range.

Another important tactical decision is the choice of shot types. Round shot is the default shot type, with upgrades providing grape shot and chain shot. Each type causes a different kind of damage, and also has various ballistic capabilities. Round shot has the longest range of the three and the most speed. Upon impact, it has a high chance of damaging a ship's hull (potentially sinking the ship), and a smaller chance of destroying cannons, killing crew, or ripping the sails. Chain shot has a shorter range and flies at a slower speed in a high trajectory. Its impact is most likely to cause sail damage to the enemy ship, slowing it down or potentially dismasting it. Chain shot also has a small chance of killing enemy crew. Grape shot is very slow and has a short range, but upon impact, it can kill large portions of the enemy crew, weakening the ship and slowing its reloading. Grape shot also has the potential of damaging enemy sails.

==== Ship capture and prizes ====
If a ship has surrendered, or its captain is defeated in combat, it is considered "captured". The player may now unload any gold and cargo from the ship, and can also add it to their fleet if there is room. If the ship's crew had a specialist, like a sailmaker or a cooper, they will be automatically added to the player's crew. Some of the captured crew may also be inclined to join the player's ranks, especially if the crew morale is high. Captured enemy crews also may have news on various events of interest to the player.

It is also possible to sink (scuttle or burn) the captured ship, desirable if it has been damaged too severely to be towed quickly to port, if no friendly ports are near, or if the player has no interest in selling the ship. If the player's crew is very small or is already maintaining a large fleet, adding an extra ship may also cause the whole fleet to become inefficient, slowing it down considerably on the sailing map.

=== Sword fighting ===
Several events will trigger a sword fighting minigame in which the player fences the opponent in one-on-one combat. These segments may or may not include crews fighting in the background, being affected by the progress of the battle as well.

Sword fighting duels often occur when two ships collide during naval combat. Sword fights can also break out during attacks on cities, particularly if the city does not have enough defenders to mount a battle outside the city gates, and if the player manages to reach the town gates in the land battles without first having defeated the enemy force. During these two kinds of fights, the player's crew and the enemy crew will have an important influence on combat. Crew sizes and morale dictate which side is more likely to lose men during the conflict. As a leader loses men, the effectiveness of his combat moves is reduced.

Dueling also occurs when the player challenges an enemy. This often takes place in taverns, when the player challenges the captain of the guard, or when confronting a known criminal and attempting to bring him to justice. When the player impresses a governor's daughter, she will eventually request him to defeat a jealous suitor in one-on-one combat. These duels occur without crew presence and are not subject to the effects of crew morale.

A duel is carried out with swords, although pistols can be acquired by the player to gain a starting advantage. During the duel, each combatant tries to strike at his enemy without being struck. Each combatant can use one of three attacks: a low slash, a high chop, and a middle thrust. Each combatant can also defend against incoming blows with a dodge (against high chops), a jump (against low slashes), or a parry (against middle thrusts). When a blow "connects"—that is, the opponent fails to block with the right move—the struck duelist moves backwards. When one duelist reaches the "limit" of the fighting area, he loses the duel and either surrenders or is knocked out of the battle.

A red and white bar across the bottom of the screen indicates battle advantage. Where the red and white portions of the bar meet indicates which duelist has the advantage. The closer the meeting point is to a duelist, the worse he is faring. When the player properly performs a blocking move or strikes the enemy, the bar shifts towards the opponent, indicating that he has lost advantage. The duelist with more advantage can attack faster, while the duelist with less advantage attacks slower. A failed attack also has the chance of disorienting the attacker, causing him to become even slower for a short time, in addition to opening him up for an attack.

Another important combat move is the taunt. If this move is executed in full without the opponent striking, the opponent loses advantage.

When fighting on ships, several events can provide opportunity for an unconventional attack. These include buckets and gaffs lying around on the ship's deck, as well as ropes swinging overhead. When the player or the enemy is adjacent to such an item, executing the correct attack will use the item (kicking the bucket, swinging from the ropes, etc.). If such an attack is successful, it knocks the enemy back and causes more disadvantage to him than a normal strike.

Lastly, almost every fighting scene has a middle point that has a strong effect on combat. On a ship, this is the flight of stairs leading from the poop deck or forecastle onto the main deck. In a tavern, this is the balcony and the stairs leading up to it. If a combatant has been pushed all the way to the middle point, a cutscene will show the two combatants moving past the obstacle. On a ship, they run down or up the stairs. In a tavern, the enemy will be knocked down the gallery, and the player will jump down as well. This has the effect of giving time for the advantage bar to swing back to the neutral position, equalizing the fight somewhat during this cutscene.

Most importantly, each fighter in a duel will select his dueling sword out of three possible selections: the rapier, the cutlass and the longsword. The rapier has the fastest attack, but also an inefficient defense. The cutlass is strong on defense, capable of quickly blocking or dodging out of harm's way, but is slow on attack. The longsword lies in the middle, with average attack and defense. When playing on the lowest difficulty setting, the player cannot choose a sword, but is automatically given a longsword. Several items can be acquired that enhance the player's fighting capabilities. In addition, selecting the "fencing" skill at the beginning of the game will give the player character a faster performance during a sword fighting duel.

As the player character ages, his sword fighting capabilities will gradually decrease, causing him to become slower (less so if the user selected the fencing skill at the beginning of the game). This is one of the methods for ensuring that older characters are pressed into retirement. On higher difficulty levels, duels become impossibly fast after the character has reached a certain age.

=== Land warfare ===
Pirates! also has land battles in which the player fights battles in a turn-based system on a grid map, much like in Civilization. This occurs whenever the player assaults a well-defended city (80 or more soldiers in the city's garrison) or Montalban's hideout.

When beginning a land assault, the player is given several units. The exact number of units is determined by the proportion of the player's crew versus the size of the city's garrison. An overwhelming superiority for either side will give that side up to 10 units to command, while equally balanced fights will generally produce four or five units for each side.

Land combat is asymmetrical; the player possesses strong units that specialize in either close or ranged combat, while the enemy's units are equally capable in both but excelling in neither. The enemy also has exclusive access to cavalry, which is a specialized close combat unit that is extremely powerful when attacking open, flat terrain, but poor on the defense and on hills and in woods. Native Americans may join a city's defense, augmenting the local garrison. Natives deploy two types of units—one for close combat and one for ranged attacks. Neither are particularly powerful, but both can move quickly through woods.

Battle takes place outside the city, on a map with hills, forests, and plains. The player's force starts out in one of three selectable positions nearer the bottom of the map, while the enemy force begins closer to the top of the map, near the city gates. The goal of this minigame is either to defeat the enemy force altogether or to have one unit reach the city gates, after which a sword duel commences against the city's captain of the guard and all remaining defenders (or, in later versions, the city is captured immediately). If the garrison initially has fewer than 80 soldiers, the battle immediately segues to the duel with the captain of the guard.

Combat is turn-based. During a side's turn, each of its units can move, attack, or fire ranged weapons. Most units can move up to two squares a turn or one through forests. Native Americans can move two squares through any terrain. Cavalry move three, giving them much higher mobility. Ranged units can move one square and then shoot or shoot first and end their turn. Units can also turn by using one movement point. Many factors determine the strength of a unit when attacking or defending, such as damage received from other units, flank attacks, combat in forests, and terrain height.

Units that are damaged in combat will lose morale, lowering their combat strength. When a unit drops below "panicked" morale, it is routed, fleeing from the field of battle. Some units will rout without reaching their lowest morale—this occurs when a unit is being attacked by a much stronger opponent, especially when flanked. If the number of enemy soldiers left to defend the city drops to 80 or lower during combat, it becomes possible for the city to be conquered for a different nationality.

==== Capturing cities ====
Successful land combat on the part of the player will yield a one-time ransom. The exact amount is determined by the city's wealth and population parameters. If the city's garrison drops below 100 during or before combat, successful land battles allow the player to change the city's government to that of a different nationality. This not only changes the political situation in the Caribbean, but also makes the new owning nation greatly pleased with the player, as well as any other countries who disliked the original owner, with whom the player's standing drops. The attack also has the effect of lowering the city's wealth rating.

=== Romance ===
Upon performing tasks favorable to one of the four nations in the game and thus being promoted enough, the player may be given the chance to romance a governor's daughter, starting with a dance at a ball. The more attractive she is (plain, attractive, beautiful), the more difficult she is to romance, and the more fame points she is worth upon marriage. Dancing is done by following the daughter's hand signals (left, right, back, forward, spin left, spin right) and moving appropriately, with higher difficulty including more complex steps and more demanding scores. Successful dancing is rewarded with 'amour' from the governor's daughter, as well as gifts or valuable information. The player becomes more nimble with the purchase of dancing shoes from the tavern merchant. When the daughter's 'amour' is high enough, she will request items such as a diamond necklace or ruby ring (purchased from the mysterious stranger at the tavern) or notify the hero that someone seeks to fight a duel over her. In the final step, the daughter is abducted, and the hero must track down the abductor aboard his ship and defeat him. Upon returning the daughter to her home city and the hero subsequently agreeing to marry her, the game will show a cutscene of the marriage, and the hero will gain bonus fame points.

=== Sneaking ===
The player may be refused docking privileges at an enemy town. In these cases, the player is given the option to sneak into town. This is done by avoiding the town's guards who patrol the city and moving towards the tavern, or governor's mansion, that are pointed to by signs throughout the city. The player may run, walk, or climb over fences, and has hay bales to hide behind to avoid detection. The player may also sneak up behind guards and knock them unconscious, which risks capture if the unconscious guards are discovered or if they wake up. If caught, the player character is thrown into jail, where he must remain to serve a sentence of several months, bribe a guard, or attempt an escape. Certain items can increase the chance of a player's escape.

=== Historical pirates ===
In the game, there are nine computer-controlled historical pirates, though many of them could not have existed at the same time because they are based on pirates who were born at different moments in the 16th and 17th centuries. Each pirate bears his own unique flag and is present on the "top ten pirates" list with the player ranked tenth. Each pirate is also based in a particular Pirate Haven. Each time one is defeated, his plunder and ship are acquired. Part of the player's overall score is determined by how many of the pirates have been defeated. The nine historical pirates in the game are Henry Morgan, Blackbeard, Stede Bonnet, Captain Kidd, Jean Lafitte, François l'Olonnais, Roc Brasiliano, Bartholomew Roberts, and John Rackham.

Each pirate has a buried treasure, and portions of the treasure maps are sometimes available for purchase in taverns. If a pirate's treasure is dug up before defeating him, that pirate will act like a "Pirate Hunter" when the player comes into his view. However, the ships they possess are not historically correct, as Blackbeard's ship "Queen Anne's Revenge" is controlled by Henry Morgan and other pirates in the game. This issue can be corrected for the computer version with the v1.01 patch.

== Reception ==
Reception

Aggregate scores
Aggregator	Score				
Aggregator	iOS	PC	PSP	Wii	Xbox
GameRankings	85%	88%	82%	62%	81%
Metacritic	87/100	88/100	82/100	64/100	80/100

Review scores
Publication	Score				
Publication	iOS	PC	PSP	Wii	Xbox
1Up.com	N/A	A−	B+	N/A	A−
Eurogamer	N/A	7/10	9/10	N/A	7/10
GameSpot	N/A	9.2/10	8.6/10	6/10	8.6/10
GameSpy	N/A	4.5/5	N/A	N/A	4/5
IGN	9/10	9.2/10	9/10	N/A	9.2/10

The critical reception for Sid Meier's Pirates! was generally positive. The PC release has an aggregate review score of 88 out of 100 on Metacritic. Steve Butts of IGN praised the solid gameplay design that combines a large variety of activities and allows the player to choose one's own style of play. The reviewer also noted the attention to detail in both visuals and sound, and described the stylized look as adding life to the experience. However, he pointed out the repetitive nature of the gameplay over time, and some mechanics that feel inconsequential. The Xbox port also was received favorably, with an aggregate review score of 80 out of 100 on Metacritic. The PlayStation Portable release scored 82/100 on Metacritic.

Computer Games Magazine named Pirates! the second-best computer game of 2004, behind World of Warcraft. The editors wrote: "It's like nothing else out there, and is as good today as it was in 1987". The staff of X-Play nominated Pirates! for their 2004 "Best Strategy Game" award, which ultimately went to Rome: Total War. The editors of Computer Gaming World named Pirates! their 2004 "Arcade Classic of the Year", and nominated it for their overall "Game of the Year" award, which ultimately went to World of Warcraft. They hailed Pirates! as "the year's most purely entertaining single-player game". It received a runner-up position in GameSpot's 2004 "Best Strategy Game" award category across all platforms, losing to Rome: Total War. During the 8th Annual Interactive Achievement Awards, Pirates! received a nomination for "Computer Game of the Year", which was ultimately awarded to Half-Life 2.

The game sold more than 1.5 million units.
