= Axel & Pixel =

2009 video game

- Xbox Live Arcade cover art
- Developer: Silver Wish Games
- Publisher: 2K
- Designer: Ivan Kratochvíl
- Artists: Jan Kokolia; Jan Kottman; Martin Kadlčík; Peter Bílek
- Composer: Matúš Široký
- Platforms: Xbox 360, Windows
- Release: Xbox 360; October 14, 2009; Windows; October 6, 2010
- Genres: Graphic adventure, art game
- Mode: Single-player

Axel & Pixel is a point-and-click adventure video game developed by Silver Wish Games. The game was released on October 14, 2009 for the Xbox 360's Xbox Live Arcade service and on October 7, 2010 for Steam.

The game revolves around Axel, a painter, and his dog Pixel, who awake in a beautiful, yet perilous, dream world of Axel's own creation. Together, they must solve the mysteries of Axel's landscapes to get through the dream world by defeating the Ice Giant and helping Axel fulfill his greatest wish - to paint a picture of all four seasons in a single day.

== Gameplay ==
The game is a traditional point-and-click adventure, where the player has to logically come up with answers and solutions to riddles and problems that are encountered during the course of the game. As a way of making Axel & Pixel unique from other point-and-click adventures, the cursor is made up of a group of glittering lights, which change colour slightly if the player lands the cursor on a point of interest. Aside from the traditional point-and-click mechanics, the game also features different platform mini-games (hot-air balloon through a cave, driving through the mountains, or sailing a boat downstream). The game also makes use of quick time events in a few of the chapters as ways of helping Axel scale walls or avoiding dangerous obstacles. The game is divided into four sections - in the form of the four calendar seasons - which are unlocked through natural progression of the story. Each of the mini-games featured are used once in story mode as ways of pursuing Evil Rat through the dream world, from the last chapter of the current calendar season into the beginning of the next one. Unlike most point-and-click adventures, Axel & Pixel contains no dialogue option between characters, in an attempt to keep the gameplay focused more on solving the puzzles instead of interactions. Axel, however, will speak gibberish to Pixel and to himself occasionally.

== Reception ==
Reception

Aggregate score
Aggregator	Score
Metacritic	72/100

Review scores
Publication	Score
Adventure Gamers	(PC) 3/5
Eurogamer	7/10
GameRevolution	C−
GamesMaster	83%
GameSpot	5.5/10
GameZone	8/10
IGN	8.2/10
MeriStation	7/10
Official Xbox Magazine (US)	7/10
TeamXbox	6/10
Teletext GameCentral	6/10

The Xbox 360 version received "mixed or average reviews" according to the review aggregation website Metacritic. Axel & Pixel was described by critics as "a charming and surreal trip." The dream world, especially, was received with acclaim, with critics calling it "bizarre and beautiful," "unique and charming" and "graceful and fresh." The game was primarily criticized for its short length, as the story can be completed in roughly three hours.

=== Sales ===
Since its release, the game sold 13,552 units worldwide on the Xbox 360 as of January 2011. Sales had moved to 18,772 units by the end of 2011.
