= The Misadventures of P.B. Winterbottom =

2010 video game

- Developers: The Odd Gentlemen; 2K China (PC)
- Publisher: 2K
- Platforms: Xbox 360 (XBLA), Windows
- Release: Xbox 360 (XBLA); February 17, 2010; Windows; April 20, 2010
- Genre: Puzzle-platform
- Mode: Single-player

The Misadventures of P.B. Winterbottom is a puzzle-platform game for Xbox Live Arcade and Windows PC developed by The Odd Gentlemen. Reviews praised its unique puzzle mechanics, comparing them to the likes of Portal and Braid. It was released for the Xbox 360 on February 17, 2010. It was originally a student's graduate thesis at the University of Southern California. It was published by 2K Play. The Windows version was released exclusively via Steam on April 20, 2010.

== Gameplay ==
Gameplay screenshot

The Misadventures of P.B. Winterbottom is a puzzle-platform game. The player controls P.B. Winterbottom to gather pies. Winterbottom has the ability to manipulate time and replicate himself into multiple clones. The player may record an action and a clone will repeat that action, serving as a platform, pie-fetcher, or other puzzle-solving device.

The game is visually presented in a manner reminiscent of a silent film, reminiscent of art nouveau or films from the late 1800s/early 1900s. As such there is no spoken dialogue, as all speech is instead shown through title cards in between stages. The game is also shown in mostly black-and-white and features a score primarily composed of piano-centric arrangements bearing a style similar to those of silent-era films.

== Reception ==
Reception

Aggregate score
Aggregator	Score	
Aggregator	PC	Xbox 360
Metacritic	79/100	83/100

Review scores
Publication	Score	
Publication	PC	Xbox 360
1Up.com	N/A	A+
Destructoid	N/A	9.5/10
Edge	N/A	8/10
Eurogamer	N/A	8/10
Game Informer	N/A	8.5/10
GamePro	N/A	4.5/5
GameRevolution	N/A	A−
GameSpot	7.5/10	7.5/10
GameSpy	N/A	4.5/5
IGN	N/A	8.3/10
Official Xbox Magazine (US)	N/A	8/10
PC Gamer (UK)	80%	N/A
Teletext GameCentral	N/A	8/10

The game received "favorable" reviews on both platforms according to the review aggregation website Metacritic.

1Up.com said of the Xbox 360 version, "Without the world that The Odd Gentlemen created around their pie-collecting platformer, Winterbottom would still be an addictive adventure with playful physics. But the carefully crafted setting, the intertwining of ingenious puzzles with a portly, gluttonous protagonist, makes this a terrific game that I wholeheartedly recommend you play immediately." Destructoid said of the same console version, "All of the art is downright beautiful to look at and levels feel like paper dioramas. Both dirty yet refined, there's a simple elegance to every detail in the levels and story frames that draws you in." GamePro said of the same console version, "Wonderfully imaginative premise and puzzles; excellent visual design and stellar original soundtrack. The Misadventures of P.B. Winterbottom is a quirky and utterly lovable game but its true value is this: it strengthens the idea that DLC is a viable way for smaller development houses to get their content to market. It also reinforces the idea that it isn't the size of the budget or the team but rather the ideas and concepts that serve as a game's foundation. But that's just us waxing poetic—at the end of the day, P.B. Winterbottom is fun, and really, that's what it's all about."

=== Awards ===
The Misadventures of P.B. Winterbottom was a showcased nominee and received the Story/World Design award at IndieCade (the International Festival of Independent Games) in 2008.
