= Dora the Explorer video games =

Dora the Explorer
- Publishers: Gotham Games; Global Star Software; 2K
- Platforms: PlayStation, Game Boy Advance, GameCube, PlayStation 2, Nintendo DS, Wii, PlayStation 3 (PlayStation Store)

Multiple video games based on the 2000 Nick Jr. television show Dora the Explorer have been released. Most of these games have received a mixed critical reception. Unlike other video games, these were not released in Asia, due to the TV show having less interest in that continent than North America and Europe. A number of other video games were released exclusively for the Nick Jr. website, such as Dora's 3D Driving Adventure, and Dora's 3D Pyramid Adventure.

== Barnyard Buddies ==
Dora the Explorer: Barnyard Buddies is an action-adventure game developed by Santa Cruz Games and published by Gotham Games for the PlayStation on November 18, 2003, in North America and released in the PAL regions on May 2, 2005. Dora and Boots take a trip to the farm, but when they arrive they discover that someone has left the gate open and all the animals have wandered off. The player must help Dora find all 8 of the farm animals. It is the only Dora the Explorer game released for the PlayStation and is one of the last titles on the system. The game's cutscenes were made with Claymation. The game was met with mixed to positive reviews from critics.

== Super Star Adventures ==
Dora the Explorer: Super Star Adventures is an adventure game for the Game Boy Advance released in 2004. It was developed by ImaginEngine and published by Global Star Software. The game uses pictures and symbols to communicate rather than words. The object of the game is to capture one of the six explorer stars. Each explorer star has a special power such as the ability to be noisy or the ability to create music. In order to capture it, the player must complete a hide-and-seek activity. These activities include maze navigation, matching games, side-scrolling race games, a Frogger-esque game, a complete the pattern activity and a song playing game (Simon (game)).

== Journey to the Purple Planet ==
Dora the Explorer: Journey to the Purple Planet is an action-adventure game, developed by Monkey Bar Games, published by Global Star Software and powered by Vicious Engine. The game was released for the GameCube in North America on October 13, 2005, and later in PAL regions on December 16, 2005. The PlayStation 2 version was released in North America on October 13, 2005, and later on PAL regions on December 2, 2005. An Xbox version was planned, but was cancelled. The game is about Dora and Boots who finds some lost aliens from the purple planet. However, to take them home, she and Boots must collect keys to open the space gate, leading to Saturn. It is the only Dora the Explorer video game for the Nintendo GameCube.

IGN's Chris Roper gave Journey to the Purple Planet a 7.0/10. Chris said that the "decent, simple puzzles are well-placed in the Dora universe", and stated "Dora the Explorer: Journey to the Purple Planet can be a fun adventure for young children who are learning their first school-related skills, like how to count, pick out colors, etc. The fact that it's tied to a highly popular television show is certainly a bonus as well. There are a couple drawbacks, like the fact that it doesn't actually teach in any way, it lacks an autosave and there might be a confusing section or two. For the most part though, the game does a good job of presenting simple puzzles with the Dora the Explorer franchise in a way that will please and entertain young kids".

== Dora Saves the Mermaids ==
Dora the Explorer: Dora Saves the Mermaids is an adventure game developed by Black Lantern Studios in North America in 2007 for the Nintendo DS, and by Totally Games for the PlayStation 2 in 2008, published by 2K. It was later released in PAL regions that same year. Dora Saves the Mermaids is set in the Mermaid Kingdom where an evil octopus insists on dumping garbage into the ocean, making the Mermaid Kingdom covered in trash. Players assume the role of Dora who must help Mariana the Mermaid find her missing magical mermaid crown, but the only way to accomplish the task is for Dora to become a mermaid herself. Along the way (95% of the time), players run Dora around snaking paths, pick up gems and get from point A to point B while encountering wrinkles as things that bounce or catapult Dora into the air.

The game received mixed reviews from critics. The DS version received an aggregate score of 55.40% from GameRankings (5 reviews), while the PlayStation 2 versions received a 64% from GameRankings (2 reviews). In an IGN review, Sam Bishop did praise the game for pulling the voice actors from the show, which he said "was a wise move." and the visuals, which he said "do absolutely nothing to wow, but don't look terribly ugly either.", but criticized the game's variety that he said "would have helped keep the entertainment up above the level of, say, passively watching that Dora DVD for the 857 millionth time.", stating "As an educational tool, Dora Saves the Mermaids falls flat. As a simple distraction, it falls short, and as a game that is meant to get adults in on the action to help out, it isn't really a very collaborative experience. Yes, it's a kids game, but that doesn't mean that it has to feel like a bit of a rip-off."

== Dora Saves the Snow Princess ==
Dora Saves the Snow Princess is a platforming game for the PS2, DS, and Wii, published by 2K releasing on October 27, 2008, for the United States. The game is a 2D platformer in which the player controls Dora through the main adventure "Snowy Adventure" with the general premise being that Dora and Boots have to travel through the game world to save the snow princess, Sabrina, who has been trapped by an evil Witch. The game also offers "Extras" and "Snowy Forest Ride" alongside the main adventure as extensions to the core gameplay. Gameplay through "Snowy Adventure" is based around completing simple platforming levels to advance through the game eventually saving the snow princess, with longplay taking around 2 hours. Players throughout the level can collect Snow Sparks, and use items from Dora's backpack to advance through the levels, with additional traversal options being jumping on mushrooms for increased height . The gameplay can be described as incredibly similar to Dora Saves The Crystal Kingdom. The game received primarily negative reviews from critics. IGN awarded the game with a 5.7/10 stating "When it comes down to it, Dora the Explorer: Dora Saves the Snow Princess is a game intended for preschoolers, and in that it's a decent effort." with criticism directed towards the games short length, the repetitive gameplay, and the lack of any challenge, even for a young audience, the game presents.

== Dora Puppy ==
Dora Puppy is a puppy simulation game developed by Black Lantern Studios and published by 2K in North America and Australia in 2009, and in Europe in 2010, for the Nintendo DS. Players must help Dora take care of her puppy, Perrito, and help train him for doggie competitions. Care involves washing and brushing, providing food and water, letting the dog outside to do its business, cleaning up paw prints, and playing several different games with the puppy. Players earn tokens for each task, which they can use to buy new toys or clothes for Perrito, or to enter him into the Big Puppy Competition. The competition involves helping Perrito run an obstacle course and having him strike poses. All the actions are performed by either tracing certain shapes with the stylus or calling out commands into the DS's microphone.

== Dora Saves the Crystal Kingdom ==
Dora the Explorer: Dora Saves the Crystal Kingdom is a side-scrolling game developed by High Voltage Software and published by 2K. It was released for Wii in North America on November 3, 2009, and in Europe on November 27, 2009. The game was later than released on Computer Platforms and the PlayStation 2 in North America on November 12, 2009. The game is about a King that has hid the Crystals in the Crystal Kingdom, and Dora and Boots must find all of the crystals to save the Crystal Kingdom. As the game is played, players have to find 4 color crystals in three of the stories, plus the one from the king. Before players go into the storybook, players have to collect as many pages as they can for that story, which some pages are hidden in crystal barrels which Boots can dive into them to get the page out of the barrel.

In a Common Sense Media Review, Jinny Gudmundsen awarded the Crystal Kingdom 5 stars, and called it a "perfect starter game for Wii.". Kyle Sudukis on Impulsive Gamer gave the game a 7.6/10, and said that the game "is not like the other edutainment titles from Dora the Explorer but is an actual arcade style Wii game which uses the motion sensitivity of the Nintendo Wii controls.", stating "I applaud 2K Play for creating a girl only game and thankfully it's not edutainment or a game that has been slapped together. Mirroring many aspects of other arcade games, Dora save the Crystal Kingdom is a colorful delight that will captivate the younger gamer while they explore a variety of worlds and meet familiar faces from the Dora the Explorer Universe. Not bad at all!".

There was also iPhone app called "Dora Saves the Crystal Kingdom – Rainbow Ride" was released for $3 on the iTunes Store on September 25, 2009. In the app, players tilt the phone left and right to steer Dora along a twisty rainbow slide which players ride over crystals to collect them, and count along with Dora with each recovered crystal. The app also includes a coloring book application within the game that lets iPhone users use the color crystals to color the Crystal Kingdom via a touch screen coloring book.

== Dora's Cooking Club ==
Dora's Cooking Club was published by 2K and released for the Nintendo DS on October 26, 2010, in North America. The game primarily focuses on improving and expanding on early math skills in the form of cooking recipes. Players in this game can choose to play Adventure Mode where you progress through events where you will be cooking new things and obtaining new mini-games. Game actions include using the stylus on the touch screen to do things like chopping ingredients, moving ingredients, stirring and mixing, and topping pizzas. The game also features some pattern recognition, mainly with ingredients, putting ingredients in the correct places, etc. There is a Replay a Game feature where players can replay a mini-game that they have previously unlocked. All mini-games progressively get harder, encouraging the player to widen their understanding of math skills. Finally, the game features a Progress Report, allowing the player's parents to view how their child is progressing and learning within the game.
