= The Odd Gentlemen =

American video game developer

- Industry: Video games
- Founded: 2008; 18 years ago
- Founder: Matt Korba; Paul Bellezza
- Headquarters: Los Angeles, California, U.S.
- Products: The Misadventures of P.B. Winterbottom; Slap Happy Sam; Wayward Manor; King's Quest
- Website: TheOddGentlemen.com

The Odd Gentlemen is an American video game developer founded by Matt Korba and Paul Bellezza in 2008.

== History ==
Its first video game is The Misadventures of P.B. Winterbottom. It was originally Matt Korba's graduate thesis at the University of Southern California. The Misadventures of P.B. Winterbottom is a puzzle platform game that boasted the company's quirky art style. It was published by 2K Play.

They have also released a game in the PlayStation 3's social gaming network, PlayStation Home, called Slap Happy Sam.

In 2012, The Odd Gentlemen released their first iPhone game, Flea Symphony.

Author Neil Gaiman announced in June 2013 he would be making his first game with the help of The Odd Gentlemen. The game is called Wayward Manor and was released in 2014.

At least as early as 2014, the Odd Gentlemen were attached to the production of Andrew Hussie's Homestuck adventure game, Hiveswap. On June 19, 2014, Hussie announced their involvement via backer-only Kickstarter update. The studio publicly acknowledged their involvement with the game two days later, on June 21. On October 30, 2014, Hussie announced that The Odd Gentlemen's involvement was winding down and that the Homestuck merchandise and art studio, What Pumpkin Games, would finish Hiveswap and subsequent titles in-house.

On August 12, 2014, Activision announced that The Odd Gentlemen would make a King's Quest adventure game as part of their revival of the Sierra plan. The game was developed as an episodic release consisting of five chapters and a bonus playable epilogue. The first chapter, "A Knight to Remember", was released on July 28, 2015. The fifth chapter was released on October 26, 2016.
