= Don King Presents: Prizefighter =

2008 video game

- Developer: Venom Games
- Publisher: 2K
- Composer: Malcolm Kirby Jr.
- Platform: Xbox 360
- Release: NA: June 10, 2008; EU: June 13, 2008; AU: July 3, 2008
- Genres: Sports, fighting
- Modes: Single-player, multiplayer

Don King Presents: Prizefighter is a boxing video game for the Xbox 360. It was developed by Venom Games (the last game to be released before discontinuation), published by 2K and released in June and July 2008. A Wii and Nintendo DS version, called Don King Boxing, was released in 2009. Players will take on the role of a boxer as they participate in fights and build their careers. This includes balancing training commitments, overcoming adversity and finding the right promotion balance. The storyline of the game is told in a sports documentary-style, with the ultimate goal being to win the title belt.

== Gameplay ==
Don King Presents: Prizefighter incorporates the face buttons for punching. The player has a basic jab, cross, hook and uppercut. Pulling the right trigger directs each punch to the body. By holding the right bumper with any of the punch buttons, the player can perform "step-in" punches, which have more power and longer range. By moving the left analog stick up or down while holding the right bumper they will execute a variety of "step-around" punches, which as the name implies, are punches thrown as they step around their opponent, sometimes resulting in a better angle for the attacker to land a punch. Executive producer Matt Seymour emphasized the importance of having a true 3D plane in Prizefighter that makes it possible to utilize angles for punching, as opposed to the 2D-based fighting seen in previous boxing games, where both fighters are permanently locked on to each other on a 2D plane. For defense, pushing the right analog stick up or down results in a high or low block. By holding the left trigger, the player can duck, weave and lean using the left analog stick. They are able to block while leaning. Also, double tapping the left analog stick towards any direction performs a "dash", which is a quick evasive move that will avoid punches when timed properly.

There are three meters governing each fighter, health, stamina and adrenaline. The health meter is depleted with every punch landed but staying away from further punishment will slowly replenish it during the round. While the player regains some health in between rounds, the bar gets shorter as the rounds progress, depending on how much damage they take. The health meter also affects their overall speed, along with the stamina bar. The stamina meter gets drained much faster than those seen in other boxing titles. Throwing a single flurry of punches could be enough to empty the stamina bar, at which point the fighter will be extremely slow and vulnerable, with his punches becoming significantly weaker. However, by resting for a few seconds, the stamina bar quickly refills. The system eliminates 'button mashing' and encourages players to pick their shots and box in a realistic manner. In addition, doing dash moves repeatedly will deplete the stamina bar. The adrenaline meter gives players access to powerful signature punches. The meter is divided into three sections, with each section representing one signature punch. Holding the left bumper with any punch button results in different signature punches. When the meter is full, the player has the choice to go into "adrenaline mode" by pressing the left and right bumpers simultaneously. While in this mode, the color palette of the screen changes and the player's stats are maxed out for approximately 10 seconds and can punch faster and harder with no speed or stamina penalties. By landing their own combos and defending against their opponent's, the player fills the adrenaline bar. Landing step-in and step-around punches fill the meter a little quicker. Most players will be able to fill at least the first section of the adrenaline bar within a full round, but filling the entire meter could take 2 or more rounds.

The by far best way to shorten the opponent's health meter is with knockdowns, that is fully depleting their health meter before the end of the round. The game also features nearly one-punch KO's that result from a well-placed signature or step-in punch. Counters are also rewarded with extra damage and staggering the opponent, but only works against the heavy punches. The high- and low-block means the player's never completely safe from taking a hit and if a light punch is thrown to meet a heavy punch the heavy punch will still keep going and connect, even though they're slower, easier to predict and wear out the fighter. As a result, this means that, just like in boxing; rushing can beat blocking, counters can beat rushing, out-boxing can beat counters, heavy blows can beat out-boxing and blocking can beat heavy blows. Matches can end after just one or two knockdowns, with the referee waiving the fight off without a count. The connect rates mirror real-life boxing matches, with each exhibition bout against the CPU averaging at around 37% of the punches landed, as opposed to the relatively high connect rates common in other boxing games. The AI is the toughest seen in any recent boxing game, with the CPU taking advantage of every opening and every mistake players make, as well as using sound defense and demonstrating overall awareness.

== Roster ==
Over 40 licensed professional boxers listed below:

=== Heavyweight ===
- Andrew Golota
- Samuel Peter
- Sergei Liakhovich
- Shannon Briggs

=== Cruiserweight ===
- Chad Dawson
- Enzo Maccarinelli
- O'Neil Bell
- Steve Cunningham

=== Middleweight ===
- Kelly Pavlik
- Arthur Abraham
- Daniel Santos
- Edison Miranda
- Joe Calzaghe
- Ricardo Mayorga (Exclusive character from GameStop)
- Roman Karmazin

=== Welterweight ===
- Andre Berto
- Ivan Kirpa
- José Luis Castillo
- Julio César Chávez, Jr.
- Luis Collazo

=== Lightweight ===
- Joan Guzmán
- Joel Casamayor
- Juan Díaz
- Julio Díaz
- Nate Campbell

=== Featherweight ===
- Chris John
- Daniel Ponce de León
- Elio Rojas
- Juan Manuel Márquez
- Vic Darchinyan

=== Classic boxers ===
- Joe Louis
- Ken Norton
- Larry Holmes
- Rocky Marciano
- Floyd Patterson
- Archie Moore
- James Braddock
- Max Baer
- Chris Eubank
- Nigel Benn

== Reception ==
Reception

Aggregate score
Aggregator	Score
Metacritic	56/100

Review scores
Publication	Score
The A.V. Club	D
Edge	4/10
Eurogamer	6/10
Game Informer	7.5/10
GameRevolution	D+
GameSpot	5.5/10
GameSpy	2.5/5
GameTrailers	5.7/10
GameZone	6/10
IGN	5/10
Official Xbox Magazine (US)	7/10
411Mania	6.2/10

The game received "mixed" reviews according to the review aggregation website Metacritic. It was widely criticized due to its "behind the times" graphics, which were inferior to its biggest competitor, along with the previous release of EA Sports' Fight Night Round 3, despite being released years later.
