= Birthday Party Bash =

2009 video game

- North American box art
- Developer(s): Cat Daddy Games
- Publisher(s): 2K
- Platform(s): Wii
- Release: EU: June 19, 2009; AU: June 26, 2009; NA: July 14, 2009
- Genre(s): Party

Birthday Party Bash (known in Europe and Australia as It's My Birthday) is a 2009 party video game developed by Cat Daddy Games and published by 2K for the Wii.

== Gameplay ==
Birthday Party Bash features 22 minigames, including "Hot Potato Toss" and "Super Sack Racing". The game featured the "Happy Birthday To You" song. The game also came with a party planning guide for various occasions. In-game advertising was present for the Duncan Hines brand of cake mixes.

== Reception ==
Common Sense Media gave the game 4 stars out of 5, praising the variety of minigames and its ease of use in creating playlists.
