= MLB Superstars =

2008 video game for the Wii

- Developer: Deep Fried Entertainment
- Publisher: 2K
- Platform: Wii
- Release: NA: November 10, 2008
- Genre: Sports
- Modes: Single-player, multiplayer

MLB Superstars is a spin-off of Major League Baseball 2K8 aimed at younger players for the Wii, developed by Canadian studio Deep Fried Entertainment and published by 2K. It was released on November 10, 2008.

MLB Superstars offers gamers a wide variety of activities, including baseball, golf, Mascot Dance, The Green Monster game (which players attempt to bring down the famous Fenway Park outfield wall by swinging baseball bats at it) and many more.

== Reception ==
Reception

Review scores
Publication	Score
GameZone	3/10
IGN	2.8/10

MLB Superstars received overwhelmingly negative reception. IGN gave the game 2.8 out of 10, concluding, "In the end, this game will do what it's supposed to. It will sell a few copies to unknowing parents to go under the Christmas tree. But if just one parent manages to find their way to this review, and it prevents them from buying MLB Superstars for their child, this reviewer can sleep soundly tonight." GameZone gave it 3 out of 10, writing, "The game also features far too frequent loading...Multiplayer doesn't add any enjoyment either...MLB Superstars should be avoided at all costs. The mini-game selection is astoundingly limited, and even those are nearly unplayable. The game features no saving graces."
