= Carnival Games =

2007 video game

- North American Wii box art
- Developer: Cat Daddy Games
- Publishers: Global Star Software (Wii); 2K (DS, iPhone)
- Composer: Kyle Blondin
- Platforms: Wii, Nintendo DS, iOS (iPhone), Nintendo Switch
- Release: Wii: NA: August 27, 2007; AU: October 19, 2007; EU: October 26, 2007; DS: NA: July 8, 2008; EU: August 22, 2008; AU: September 4, 2008; iPhone; August 5, 2010
- Genre: Party
- Modes: Single-player, multiplayer

Carnival Games (known in Europe and Australia as Carnival Funfair Games) is a party video game for Wii, Nintendo DS and iPhone, with a re-release for Nintendo Switch. It was the last game published by Global Star Software, before it was absorbed into Take-Two Interactive (and what is now 2K).

Despite mixed reviews by most gaming websites and critics, the game was a commercial success. The Wii and DS versions of the game sold over six million units as of June 2010, which, according to the NPD Group, was the third best-selling third-party game on the Wii.

As a result of the original's success, a follow-up for the Wii was launched in the fall of 2008, titled Carnival Games: Mini-Golf. A proper sequel, New Carnival Games, was released on September 21, 2010, for the Wii and Nintendo DS. A new game for PlayStation 4, Xbox One and Nintendo Switch, simply called Carnival Games, was released on November 6, 2018, and for Microsoft Windows (Steam) on November 19, 2020.

== Gameplay ==
The game consists of various mini-games with a funfair theme, such as Alley Bowling, Lucky Cups, Nerves of Steel, Hoops, Day at the Races, and Buckets Of Fun. These are set up through five different themed areas of the carnival. The player can even win virtual prizes depending on their score. There are many easter eggs hidden as well. The player can also play the multiplayer mode with up to four players by selecting a booth. Games includes ka-pow and hole in 1.

== Reception ==
Carnival Games (2007)

Aggregate scores
Aggregator	Score	
Aggregator	DS	Wii
GameRankings	N/A	58.39%
Metacritic	48/100	56/100

Review scores
Publication	Score	
Publication	DS	Wii
Eurogamer	N/A	5/10
Game Informer	N/A	5.5/10
GamePro	N/A	2/5
GameRevolution	N/A	D
GameSpot	5.5/10	4.5/10
GameSpy	N/A	3.5/5
GameTrailers	N/A	7.3/10
GameZone	5.8/10	6.8/10
IGN	6.5/10	6.5/10
Nintendo Power	4.5/10	7/10
Pocket Gamer	1.5/5	N/A

The Wii version received "mixed" reviews, while the DS version received "generally unfavorable reviews", according to the review aggregation website Metacritic.

The former version received a "Double Platinum" sales award from the Entertainment and Leisure Software Publishers Association (ELSPA), indicating sales of at least 600,000 units in the UK.

== Sequels ==
A follow-up entitled Carnival Games: Mini-Golf was released in the United States on October 21, 2008.

A proper sequel, New Carnival Games, was released on September 21, 2010, and published by 2K Play. New Carnival Games features over 30 minigames. It supports but does not require the Wii MotionPlus accessory. For the Wii version, there is a four player multiplayer mode, which involves cooperative and competitive gameplay.

A virtual reality installment titled Carnival Games VR was released for SteamVR on October 28, 2016, and later ported to PlayStation VR on January 23, 2017. As of 2018, the series had sold over 9.5 million units.

Year	Title	Publisher	Platform(s)
2008	Carnival Games: Mini-Golf	2K Play	Wii
2010	New Carnival Games	2K Play	Nintendo DS, Wii
2011	Carnival Games: Monkey See, Monkey Do!	2K Play	Xbox 360
2011	Carnival Games Wild West 3D	2K Play	Nintendo 3DS
2016	Carnival Games VR	2K	HTC Vive, Oculus Rift, PlayStation VR, Valve Index
2017	Carnival Games VR: Alley Adventure	2K	HTC Vive, Oculus Rift, PlayStation VR, Samsung Gear VR, Valve Index
2018	Carnival Games (2018)	2K	Nintendo Switch, PlayStation 4, Windows, Xbox One

=== Carnival Games (2018) ===
Carnival Games (2018)

Aggregate score
Aggregator	Score
Metacritic	(NS) 49/100

Review scores
Publication	Score
Nintendo Life	7/10
Nintendo World Report	3/10

A new game in the series, simply called Carnival Games, was released on November 6, 2018, for PlayStation 4, Xbox One and Nintendo Switch, and on November 19, 2020, for Windows (Steam). It was developed by Mass Media Games. The Switch version received "generally unfavorable reviews", according to Metacritic.
