= Venom Games =

British video game developer

Venom Games Limited
- Company type: Subsidiary
- Industry: Video games
- Predecessor: Rage Newcastle
- Founded: 2003; 22 years ago
- Founder: Peter Johnson
- Defunct: July 2008
- Fate: Dissolved
- Headquarters: Gateshead, England
- Key people: Peter Johnson (studio head)
- Parent: Take-Two Interactive; (2004–2005); 2K Games; (2005–2008)

Venom Games Limited was a British video game developer based in Gateshead, England. The studio was established by Peter Johnson in 2003 and succeeded Rage Newcastle. Take-Two Interactive acquired the company in 2004, where it became part of the 2K label in 2005 and was closed down in July 2008.

== History ==
Venom Games was established in 2003 as successor to the previously closed Rage Newcastle, a studio of Rage Games, and headed by Peter Johnson as studio head. In 2004, the company was acquired by Take-Two Interactive. The deal's negotiations were handled by law firm Weightmans. On 25 January 2005, Take-Two Interactive announced the opening of publishing label 2K, which would henceforth manage their development studios, including Venom Games.

On 2 July 2008, employees of Venom Games were informed that the company was due to close at the end of the month. Take-Two Interactive confirmed that they were "assessing the role of Venom Games" and considering "possible redundancies", though no final decision would be made "until after the consultation with employees". Venom Games still shut down that year.

== Games developed ==
Year	Title	Platform(s)	Publisher
2004	Rocky: Legends	PlayStation 2	Ubisoft
2004	Rocky: Legends	Xbox	Ubisoft
2006	Prey	Xbox 360	2K Games
2008	Don King Presents: Prizefighter	Xbox 360	2K Sports
