= Don King Boxing =

2009 video game

- Wii version cover
- Developer: 2K Shanghai
- Publisher: 2K
- Platforms: Nintendo DS, Wii
- Release: PAL: March 27, 2009; NA: March 31, 2009
- Genre: Sports video game
- Mode: Single-player

Don King Boxing is a boxing video game developed by 2K Shanghai and published by 2K for Nintendo DS and Wii in March 2009. Named in honor of legendary boxing promoter Don King.

== Reception ==
Reception

Aggregate score
| Aggregator | Score | |
| Aggregator | DS | Wii |
|---|---|---|
| Metacritic | 71/100 | 55/100 |

Review scores
| Publication | Score | |
| Publication | DS | Wii |
|---|---|---|
| 4Players | N/A | 68% |
| Eurogamer | N/A | 3/10 |
| GamesMaster | N/A | 62% |
| GameSpot | N/A | 5.5/10 |
| GamesTM | N/A | 6/10 |
| IGN | 6.8/10 | 5.8/10 |
| NGamer | N/A | 55% |
| Nintendo Power | N/A | 5.5/10 |
| Official Nintendo Magazine | N/A | 86% |
| PALGN | 7/10 | N/A |

The game received "mixed or average reviews" on both platforms according to the review aggregation website Metacritic.
