= List of Xbox System Link games =

This is a list of original Xbox games that are compatible with the System Link feature, both released and unreleased. Platinum Hits releases may not system link with non-platinum hits releases due to some Platinum Hits releases having 'Title Updates' that will not link with older versions, and some games will not link with non-updated versions if they have 'Title Updates' applied, either through XBL or a softmod. For Xbox 360 games, see List of Xbox 360 System Link games. Some games allow more players if one Xbox acts as a Dedicated Server. A Dedicated Server means one of the Xbox's hosts the others and you can't play on the host Xbox.

Xbox System Link Compatible Games
Title	Total players	Per console	Versus mode	Co-op mode	Notes
25 to Life	16	1			
187 Ride or Die	4	1			
AFL Premiership	4	1			
Amped 2	8	1			
Blazing Angels: Squadrons of WWII	16	1	16	4	
Brothers in Arms: Earned in Blood	4	2	4	2	
Brothers in Arms: Road to Hill 30	4	2			
Brute Force	8	4	8	4	Only 4 consoles can be linked together; Backwards-compatible with Xbox 360
Call of Duty 2: Big Red One	16	1			
Call of Duty 3	16	1			
Call of Duty: Finest Hour	16	1			
Carve	8	1			
Chicago Enforcer	8	1			
Close Combat: First to Fight	8	1	8	4	
Colin McRae Rally 2005	8	1			
Combat: Task Force 121	8	2			16 players with Dedicated Server
Commandos: Strike Force	8	1			
Conan	8	1			8 player Deathmatch or 1 vs 1
Conflict: Global Terror	4	1		4	
Conker: Live & Reloaded	16	1			Backwards-compatible with Xbox 360 and Xbox One
Corvette	6	1			
Counter-Strike	10	1			16 players with Dedicated Server; Team vs Missions; Human vs Bots: 2-8 humans vs 4-8 bots. Backwards-compatible with 360. Title Update must be disabled to connect with 360 consoles. DLC maps are loaded from host.
Crash Tag Team Racing	8	4			Bots available
Crimson Skies: High Road to Revenge	16	2			Backwards-compatible with Xbox 360 and Xbox One (update must be disabled to connect original Xbox cross-gen)
Dead Man's Hand	8	1	8	8	Bots available
Deathrow	8	4			Bots available
Delta Force: Black Hawk Down	32	1			Dedicated Server support
Doom 3	4	1	4	2	
Doom 3: Resurrection of Evil	4	1			No co-op
Far Cry Instincts	16	1			Dedicated Server support
Far Cry Instincts: Evolution	16	1			Dedicated Server support
Fight Club	2	1			
FlatOut	8	1			
Ford vs. Chevy	6	1			
Forza Motorsport	8	1			
Full Spectrum Warrior: Ten Hammers	8	1	8	2	3 player co-op with DLC
Godzilla: Save the Earth	4	1			
GoldenEye: Rogue Agent	8	1			
Gotcha!	12	1			
Greg Hastings' Tournament Paintball	14	1			
Greg Hastings' Tournament Paintball Max'd	14	1			
Gungriffon: Allied Strike	8	1	8	2	
Halo 2	16	4			
Halo: Combat Evolved	16	4			Only 4 consoles can be linked together
Heroes of the Pacific	8	2			
Hot Wheels: Stunt Track Challenge	6	1			
IndyCar Series 2005	12	1			Bots available
Inside Pitch 2003	2	1			
Iron Phoenix	16	1			Dedicated Server support
Juiced	6	1			
Land of the Dead: Road to Fiddler's Green	8	1	8	4	
Links 2004	4	1			
MechAssault	8	2			
MechAssault 2: Lone Wolf	12	2			
Men of Valor	12	2			12 players only in Deathmatch; 6-10 players in Team vs modes
Midnight Club 3: DUB Edition	8	1			
Midnight Club II	8	1			
Midtown Madness 3	8	1			
MotoGP	16	1			Bots available
MotoGP 2	16	4			Bots available
MotoGP: Ultimate Racing Technology 3	16	4			Bots available
MTX Mototrax	8	1			
NASCAR Heat 2002	32	4			Only 8 consoles can be linked together; Bots available
NBA Inside Drive 2004	2	1			
NFL Fever 2003	8	4			Only 2 consoles can be linked together
NFL Fever 2004	8	4			Only 2 consoles can be linked together
NHL 2K3	8	4			Only 2 consoles can be linked together
NHL Rivals 2004	10	4			Only 6 consoles can be linked together
Operation Flashpoint: Elite	14	1	14	14	
OutRun 2	8	1			
OutRun 2006: Coast 2 Coast	6	1			
Painkiller: Hell Wars	8	1			
Panzer Elite Action: Fields of Glory	16	1			Backwards-compatible with Xbox 360 and Xbox One
Pariah	8	1			16 players with Dedicated Server; Bots available
Phantom Dust	4	1			
Power Drome	8	4			Bots available
Project Gotham Racing 2	8	2			
Project: Snowblind	16	1			
RalliSport Challenge 2	16	1			Host must disable player collision to allow more than 4 players.
Raze's Hell	10	1			
Return to Castle Wolfenstein: Tides of War	16	1			Dedicated Server support
Robotech: Invasion	8	1			
Rogue Trooper	4	2		4	
Sega GT Online	6	1			
Serious Sam	8	4	8	4	Only 4 consoles can be linked together; Up to 2 players per console in co-op, 4 players per console in versus
Serious Sam II	4	1		4	
Shadow Ops: Red Mercury	8	1			
Shattered Union	2	1			
Soldier of Fortune II: Double Helix	12	1			
Spikeout: Battle Street	4	1		4	
Splat Magazine Renegade Paintball	14	1			
Spy vs. Spy	4	1			
Stacked with Daniel Negreanu	9	1			
Star Wars Jedi Knight: Jedi Academy	8	1			10 players with Dedicated Server; Bots available; Backwards-compatible with Xbox 360 and Xbox One
Star Wars: Battlefront	24	1			32 players with Title Update; Dedicated Server support; Bots available; Backwards-compatible with Xbox 360 and Xbox One
Star Wars: Battlefront II	32	4			Dedicated Server support; Bots available; Backwards-compatible with Xbox 360 and Xbox One; DLC no longer available for Xbox 360 Version
Star Wars: Republic Commando	8	1			16 players with Dedicated Server; Backwards-compatible with Xbox 360 and Xbox One
Star Wars: The Clone Wars	8	1	8	4	
Steel Battalion: Line of Contact	10	1			
Street Racing Syndicate	4	1			
TimeSplitters 2	16	4			Backwards compatible with Xbox One, but not 360.
TimeSplitters: Future Perfect	16	4			Backwards compatible with Xbox One, but not 360.
TOCA Race Driver	12	1			Only the 'Live' version of the game supports System Link; Bots available
TOCA Race Driver 2	12	1			Bots available
TOCA Race Driver 3	12	1			Bots available
Tom Clancy's Ghost Recon	16	1	16	6	
Tom Clancy's Ghost Recon 2	16	4	16	16	
Tom Clancy's Ghost Recon 2: Summit Strike	16	4	16	16	
Tom Clancy's Ghost Recon Advanced Warfighter	12	1	12	2	
Tom Clancy's Ghost Recon: Island Thunder	16	1	16	6	
Tom Clancy's Rainbow Six 3	16	1	16	4	Dedicated Server support
Tom Clancy's Rainbow Six 3: Black Arrow	16	1	16	4	Dedicated Server support
Tom Clancy's Rainbow Six: Critical Hour	16	1	16	4	Dedicated Server support (for certain game modes only)
Tom Clancy's Rainbow Six: Lockdown	16	1	16	4	Dedicated Server support (for certain game modes only)
Tom Clancy's Splinter Cell: Chaos Theory	4	1	4	2	Backwards-compatible with Xbox 360 and Xbox One, HOWEVER Xbox 360 and Xbox One update versions differ, and therefore cannot play together.
Tom Clancy's Splinter Cell: Double Agent	6	1	6	2	Dedicated Server support; Backwards-compatible with Xbox 360 and Xbox One
Tom Clancy's Splinter Cell: Pandora Tomorrow	4	1			Backwards-compatible with Xbox 360 and Xbox One; Xbox 360 and Xbox One update versions differ, cannot play together
Tony Hawk's Pro Skater 2x	8	1			
Tony Hawk's Pro Skater 3	4	1			
Tony Hawk's Pro Skater 4	8	1			
Tony Hawk's Underground	8	1			
Top Spin	4	2			Only 2 consoles can be linked together; 4 player requires 2 players on each console
Tron 2.0: Killer App	16	4			Disc Arena & Tournament, Light Cycles=8 players. Data Capture (Zones), Derez (Deathmatch) and Team Derez, overRIDE (deathmatch with switch to light cycle and back) and Team overRIDE, all 16 players.
Unreal Championship	8	4			16 players with Dedicated Server (available maps only support up to 10 players)
Unreal Championship 2: The Liandri Conflict	8	2			Dedicated Server support; Maps with: 2-8P =1, 4-8P =3, 6-8P =5, 2-6P =8, 4-6P =5, 2-4P =2; Backwards-compatible with Xbox 360 and Xbox One (must disable update on Original Xbox); Bots available
Unreal II: The Awakening	8	1			12 players with Dedicated Server
Urban Chaos: Riot Response	8	1			
Warpath	8	1			10 or 16 players with Dedicated Server; 8 or 16 player Deathmatch, Team Deathmatch; 6 or 10 player Capture the Flag, Front Line Assault
Whacked!	4	1			Bots available
World Series of Poker	9	1			
World War II Combat: Iwo Jima	8	2			16 players with Dedicated Server; Bots available
World War II Combat: Road to Berlin	8	2			16 players with Dedicated Server; Bots available
Worms 3D	10	1			EU box states 2-8 player support, while the us version lists 2-10 range...
XIII	8	1			6 player Deathmatch, Team Deathmatch; 8 player Capture the Flag, Sabotage
Yu-Gi-Oh! The Dawn of Destiny	2	1			

== See also ==
- List of Xbox 360 System Link games
- List of Xbox 360 games
- List of Xbox games
- Lists of video games
