= Amped 2 =

2003 video game

- Developer: Salt Lake Games Studio
- Publisher: Microsoft Game Studios
- Designer: Carl Schnurr
- Platform: Xbox
- Release: NA: October 28, 2003; EU: November 14, 2003
- Genre: Snowboarding
- Modes: Single player, multiplayer

Amped 2 is a sequel to Microsoft's snowboarding game Amped, which was an Xbox launch title. The game was introduced as part of the XSN Sports lineup, which included such games as NFL Fever 2004, Links 2004, NBA Inside Drive 2004, NHL Rivals 2004, Top Spin and RalliSport Challenge 2. A sequel, Amped 3, was released in 2005.

== Career Mode ==
The career mode in Amped 2 is much like other extreme sport games such as Tony Hawk's Pro Skater in which each level has goals for the player to complete. Each level or mountain has a high score and media score to break, which entails accumulating the most points in one run of the mountain and performing tricks for photographers or the media who are scattered throughout the mountain. The player must also find eight snowmen on each run as well as complete five tricks and gap locations that earn the player skill points. Skill points are used to upgrade stats such as "spin/flip", "big air", "ollie", "balance", and "switch".

In addition to these challenges, as the player progress through their career, they will be invited to events in which they compete for a top three finish which yields both fame and skill points. As the player's fame rises they gain different titles which are (from lowest to highest): "Local Rider", "Shop Rider", "Pro", "Superstar", and "#1". Once the player reaches number one in the world they are able to become a legend by completing each legend challenge on each mountain.

In addition to snowboarding, the player has the opportunity to snow skate. Snow skate adds different gameplay elements to the game which is more representative of skateboarding than snowboarding.

A character's physical features, such as clothing, goggles, and boots, can be edited.

== Tricks and game points ==
Amped 2 features 14 top snowboarding pros, including Jeremy Jones, Mikey LeBlanc, Travis Parker, Torah Bright and Janna Meyen.

The game provides a wide variety of performable tricks. There are also point multipliers which increase points when performing a difficult or stylish move.

General tricks include spins, flips, off-axes, butters, jibs, railslides, ollies, jumps, grabs, lip tricks, and tweaks. The player can also perform "combos". For example, a multiple flip + a 360 spin. Grabs can be achieved while airborne by moving the right thumbstick in any direction.

Additionally, the player can perform "style moves", which adds extra points and point multipliers to increase the player's score.

== Multiplayer ==
Amped 2 supports up to eight players on System Link or Xbox Live and allows split-screen on both.

On Xbox Live there were five different game types such as, "Just Ride", "Trick Race", "High Score", "Best Trick", and "King of the Mountain".

There are seven different courses which include, Breckenridge, Bear Mountain, Mount Hood, Laax, Mount Buller, Millicent, and New Zealand, and each course has at least two different drop points.

Amped 2's multiplayer on Xbox Live brought a number of new features not seen in any other on-line game at the time. For instance, it was the first game on Xbox Live to integrate a player's career mode character to that of their Xbox Live character. During career mode, as the player completes tasks, they gain skill points which increase their character's abilities. This then translates to the player's Xbox Live character, therefore, giving individuals who have completed the career mode an advantage over those who have not.

Many Xbox Live titles had a single host who controls the game options, but if that player were to quit their session, the entire game session would expire. However, in Amped 2, the host can choose to have either the winner, loser, or a random player of a session select the options for the following game. Also, if the host quits, the player with the next best connection gains hosting abilities rather than ending the game session.

While Xbox Live for the original Xbox was shut down in 2010, Amped 2 is now playable online using replacement online servers for the Xbox called Insignia.

== Soundtrack ==
Amped 2 has an abundant soundtrack of over 300 songs, including various underground and indie groups such as Hudson River School, Time Spent Driving, Acumen Nation, and The Peripheral Visionaries. In addition to the in-game soundtrack, players can choose to use custom soundtracks as well.

== Reception ==
Reception

Aggregate score
| Aggregator | Score |
|---|---|
| Metacritic | 80/100 |

Review scores
| Publication | Score |
|---|---|
| Edge | 8/10 |
| Electronic Gaming Monthly | 8.33/10 |
| Eurogamer | 7/10 |
| Famitsu | 32/40 |
| Game Informer | 6.75/10 |
| GamePro | 4.5/5 |
| GameSpot | 7/10 |
| GameSpy | 3/5 |
| GameZone | 8.8/10 |
| IGN | 9/10 |
| Official Xbox Magazine (US) | 8.7/10 |

The game received "favorable" reviews according to the review aggregation website Metacritic. IGN said that "if you're a fan of the original Amped, then you should feel right at home with this game", praising the game's presentation, graphics, sound and lasting appeal, but stating that while they liked the gameplay, there was still room for improvement. In Japan, where the game was ported for release as Tenku 2 (天空 2, Tenku Tsu), Famitsu gave it a score of all four eights for a total of 32 out of 40.
