= Brian Jackson (game designer) =

American video game designer

Brian Jackson (born 2 November 1972) is an American video game designer, having been in the video game industry since 1995. He has helped produce games for Electronic Arts, Microsoft, Bethesda Softworks, and Nerjyzed Entertainment. Jackson has served as a designer for BCFx, The Elder Scrolls IV: Oblivion, IHRA Drag Racing – Sportsman Edition, NFL Fever, NBA Inside Drive 2004, NCAA March Madness, Madden NFL, and Viewpoint.

Jackson received a Bachelor of Business Administration in Computer Based Information Systems from Howard University in 1992, and is a member of Alpha Phi Alpha fraternity.

Jackson, with Nerjyzed Entertainment CEO Jackie Beauchamp, was credited in the November 26, 2007 issue of Jet Magazine for helping create the first Black College Football video game. Jackson was featured in a January 2001, article in US Black Engineer: “Their Work Is All Play, Turning Pastimes into Careers in the Video Games Industry.”

In September 1998, in an article entitled: “Who Got Game?" Source Magazine credited Jackson and designer Rob Jones with helping make John Madden Football appealing to the Hip Hop community.
