= NBA Inside Drive =

- Developer: High Voltage Software
- Publishers: Microsoft, Microsoft Studios
- Platforms: Microsoft Windows, Xbox
- First release: NBA Inside Drive 2000
- Latest release: NBA Inside Drive 2004

NBA Inside Drive is a series of video games based on National Basketball Association, published by Microsoft Studios. Its main competition was NBA Live, a series from Electronic Arts.

== Games ==
Name	Release date	Systems	Cover athlete	Team
NBA Inside Drive 2000	August 26, 1999	Microsoft Windows	Ray Allen	Milwaukee Bucks
NBA Inside Drive 2002	January 23, 2002	Xbox	Vince Carter	Toronto Raptors
NBA Inside Drive 2003	October 15, 2002	Xbox	Paul Pierce	Boston Celtics
NBA Inside Drive 2004	November 18, 2003	Xbox	Shaquille O'Neal	Los Angeles Lakers

=== NBA Inside Drive 2000 ===
NBA Inside Drive 2000
- Developer: High Voltage Software
- Publisher: Microsoft
- Platform: Microsoft Windows
- Release: NA: August 26, 1999
- Genres: Sports, Simulation
- Modes: Single-player, multiplayer

The first game in the series, NBA Inside Drive 2000, was released for Microsoft Windows on August 26, 1999.

==== Reception ====
NBA Inside Drive 2000

Aggregate score
Aggregator	Score
GameRankings	75%

Review scores
Publication	Score
AllGame	4.5/5 stars
CNET Gamecenter	7/10
Computer Games Strategy Plus	3.5/5 stars
Computer Gaming World	3.5/5 stars
GameRevolution	C+
GameSpot	7/10
IGN	6.5/10
PC Accelerator	6/10
PC Gamer (UK)	67%
PC Gamer (US)	76%
PC Zone	86%

NBA Inside Drive 2000 received "favorable" reviews according to the review aggregation website GameRankings.

=== NBA Inside Drive 2002 ===
NBA Inside Drive 2002
- Developer: High Voltage Software
- Publisher: Microsoft Studios
- Platform: Xbox
- Release: NA: January 23, 2002; EU: May 17, 2002
- Genres: Sports, Simulation
- Modes: Single-player, multiplayer

After an almost two-and-a-half-year hiatus, NBA Inside Drive was brought back as NBA Inside Drive 2002 and was released in 2002 for Xbox. The game's development time was 18 months.

==== Reception ====
NBA Inside Drive 2002

Aggregate score
Aggregator	Score
Metacritic	76/100

Review scores
Publication	Score
Electronic Gaming Monthly	7.5/10 (Note: Three critics of Electronic Gaming Monthly gave the 2002 edition each a score of 8/10, 7.5/10, and 7/10.)
EP Daily	7.5/10
Game Informer	8.25/10
GameRevolution	B−
GamesMaster	76%
GameSpot	6.2/10
GameSpy	83%
GameZone	9.3/10
IGN	8.7/10
Official Xbox Magazine (US)	7.9/10

NBA Inside Drive 2002 received "generally favorable reviews" according to the review aggregation website Metacritic. GamePro said that the game was "good for a first try on the Xbox, but it's not as good as 2K2 or Live on the same system—and at the end of the day, that's what really matters." (Note: GamePro gave the 2002 edition two 3.5/5 scores for graphics and control, and two 3/5 scores for sound and fun factor.)

=== NBA Inside Drive 2003 ===
NBA Inside Drive 2003
- Developer: High Voltage Software
- Publisher: Microsoft Studios
- Platform: Xbox
- Release: NA: October 15, 2002; EU: December 6, 2002
- Genres: Sports, Simulation
- Modes: Single-player, multiplayer

Less than one year after the 2002 installment, NBA Inside Drive 2003 was released for Xbox.

==== Reception ====
NBA Inside Drive 2003

Aggregate score
Aggregator	Score
Metacritic	72/100

Review scores
Publication	Score
Electronic Gaming Monthly	7/10
EP Daily	7.5/10
Game Informer	7.5/10
GamesMaster	77%
GameSpot	7.6/10
GameSpy	4/5 stars
GameZone	8/10
IGN	8.2/10
Jeuxvideo.com	15/20
Official Xbox Magazine (US)	7.9/10

NBA Inside Drive 2003 received "average" reviews according to Metacritic. GamePro called it "a slightly better value than 2002 with tweaked gameplay and a few new features. The problem is that the competition has jumped ahead substantially within the same time frame." (Note: GamePro gave the 2003 edition three 4/5 scores for graphics, sound, and control, and 3.5/5 for fun factor.)

=== NBA Inside Drive 2004 ===
NBA Inside Drive 2004
- Developer: High Voltage Software
- Publisher: Microsoft Studios
- Platform: Xbox
- Release: NA: November 18, 2003; EU: November 28, 2003
- Genres: Sports, Simulation
- Modes: Single-player, multiplayer

The last entry in the series, NBA Inside Drive 2004, was released in 2003. It launched with other XSN Sports titles that featured a website where players could organize their own tournaments, seasons, or games.

==== Reception ====
NBA Inside Drive 2004

Aggregate score
Aggregator	Score
Metacritic	71/100

Review scores
Publication	Score
Electronic Gaming Monthly	6.67/10 (Note: Three critics of Electronic Gaming Monthly gave the 2004 edition each a score of 6/10, 7.5/10, and 6.5/10.)
Famitsu	27/40
Game Informer	6.5/10
GameRevolution	C+
GameSpot	6.8/10
GameSpy	3/5 stars
GameZone	7.8/10
IGN	8.4/10
Jeuxvideo.com	14/20
Official Xbox Magazine (US)	7.9/10
X-Play	2/5 stars

Inside Drive 2004 received "average" reviews according to Metacritic. In Japan, where the game was ported for release on January 22, 2004, Famitsu gave it a score of two sevens, one six, and one seven for a total of 27 out of 40. GamePro called it "a decent basketball game with an excellent online tie-in. Still, this series needs a serious wake-up call if it hopes to compete with the likes of EA and ESPN next year." (Note: GamePro gave the 2004 edition two 4/5 scores for graphics and sound, 4.5/5 for control, and 3.5/5 for fun factor.) (Sadly, it was not to be, as the following article section demonstrates.)

== Discontinuation ==
Following Microsoft's release of their 2004 professional sports titles, all of them were discontinued including NFL Fever and NHL Rivals 2004. In February 2005, Microsoft sold NBA Inside Drive and its other sports franchises to Ubisoft.

== See also ==
- NBA ShootOut
- NFL Fever
