= Brian Jackson =

Brian Jackson may refer to:

== Entertainment ==
- Brian Jackson (actor) (1931–2022), British actor in 1980s commercials
- Brian Jackson (conductor) (born 1943), Canadian conductor
- Brian Jackson (musician) (born 1952), American jazz musician
- Brian Jackson (game designer) (born 1972), video game designer
- Brian Keith Jackson (born 1968), American novelist
- Brian Jackson, character in the novel Starter for Ten

== Sports ==
- Brian Jackson (cricketer) (1933–2024), English cricketer for Derbyshire
- Brian Jackson (footballer, born 1933) (1933–2020), English footballer
- Brian Jackson (footballer, born 1936) (1936–1992), English footballer
- Brian Jackson (basketball) (born 1959), American basketball player
- Brian Jackson (rugby league) (born 1966), Australian rugby league footballer
- Brian Jackson (American football) (born 1987), American football cornerback

== Other ==
- Brian Jackson (educator) (1932–1983), British educator
- Brian A. Jackson (born 1960), federal judge
