= List of Xbox 360 System Link games =

This is a list of Xbox 360 games that are compatible with the System Link feature, both released and unreleased, organized alphabetically by name. A system link connects two or more 360 consoles together without an internet connection. For original Xbox games, please see List of Xbox System Link games.

Xbox 360 System Link Compatible Games
Title	Total players	Per console	Versus mode	Co-op mode	Notes
2176 Supernova Storm (XNA game)	8				source: mobygames.com
A Game of Tennis (Indie)	2				source: mobygames.com
A Wizard's Odyssey (Indie)	4				source: mobygames.com
Abaddon (Indie)	8				source: mobygames.com
Abaddon: Retribution (Indie)	8				source: mobygames.com
Age of Booty (Arcade)	8	4	8	4	Bots available for empty player slots.
Air Conflicts: Pacific Carriers	8	1	8	0	source: mobygames.com
Air Conflicts: Secret Wars	8	1	8	0	
Air Conflicts: Vietnam	8	1	8	0	source: mobygames.com
Aliens: Colonial Marines	12	1	12	4	mobygames.com: only 4p
America's Army: True Soldiers	16	2			
Ancient Trader (Indie)	4				source: mobygames.com
Angry Brainless Bovines (Indie)	4				source: mobygames.com
Armored Core 4	8	1			
Armored Core For Answer	8	2			CO-OP is online only not sys link
Avatar Golf (Indie)	8	1			Community Game.
Avatar Honor and Duty (Indie)	8	1			Community Game.
Avatar Karting (Indie)	8	1			Community Game.
Avatar Laser Tag (Indie)	?	?			Community Game.
Baja: Edge of Control	16	1			10p per mobygames.com
Bankshot Billiards 2 (Arcade)	2	1			
Battle vs. Chess	2	1	2		
Beijing 2008	8	4	4		
Bionic Commando	8	1			
BioShock 2	?10	?1			Must be logged into Xbox live. You need Xbox live gold account on each console to be able to use the system link or it won't work.
Blacksite: Area 51	?16	?1			You need Xbox live account to be able to use the system link or it won't work.
Blazing Angels: Squadrons of WWII	16	1			16 player co-op
Blazing Angels 2: Secret Missions of WWII	16	1			16 player vs., 4 player co-op
Bliss Island (Arcade)	2	1			source: mobygames.com
Blocks and Big Robots (Indie)	8	1			Community Game.
Blocks and Choppers (Indie)	8	1			Community Game.
Blocks and Tanks (Indie)	8	1			Community Game.
Blur	20	1	4		Bots available for empty player slots.
Borderlands	4	1			
Borderlands 2	4	2			4P Coop
Borderlands: The Pre-Sequel!	4	2			4P Coop
Brütal Legend	8	1			
Call of Duty 2	16	1			
Call of Duty 3	24	4			
Call of Duty 4: Modern Warfare	24	1			
Call of Duty: Advanced Warfare	12	1	12	4	Multiplayer requires downloading compatibility updates. Bots available for multiplayer. 4P Coop for Exo Survival & Exo Zombies (if DLC has been purchased)
Call of Duty: Black Ops	18	2			4P Coop.
Call of Duty: Black Ops II	18	2	4	4	4P Coop (4 on 1 console or 2x2 over system link) Bots available for empty player slots, The player maximum is 16 within System Link
Call of Duty: Black Ops III	12	1			NOTE: This game does NOT SUPPORT Splitscreen in any way, Activision had previously confirmed this.
Call of Duty: Ghosts	12	1	12	4-6	Bots available for multiplayer. Wargames, Squad Assault=6 coop. Extinction=4 coop. Xbox live no longer required for System Link due to title update.
Call of Duty: Modern Warfare 2	18	1			Coop is only in team play. 4P local split screen
Call of Duty: Modern Warfare 3	18	1			Coop is only in team play. 4P local split screen
Call of Duty: World at War	18	1			4P Coop.
Call of Juarez	16	1			
Call of Juarez: Bound in Blood	12	1	12	2	
CellFactor: Psychokinetic Wars (Arcade)	12				source: mobygames.com
Chaotic Shadow Warriors	2	1			
Colin McRae: Dirt	100	1			
Colin McRae: Dirt 2	8	1			
Condemned 2	8	1			
Conflict: Denied Ops	16	1			2P Coop
Crackdown	2	1			2P Coop/VS; (note about DLC multiplayer races)
Crash Time 4	8	?			
Cyber Troopers Virtual-On Force	4	1			
Cyber Troopers Virtual-On Oratorio Tangram (Arcade)	2	1			Online 8 total, but 2 active players and 6 viewers.
Dark Sector	10	1			Bots available for empty player slots.
Dead Island	4	1			4P Coop
Dead Island Riptide	4	1			4P Coop
Diablo 3	4	4		4	Online and system link 4 total
Diablo 3: Reaper of Souls	4	4		4	Online and system link 4 total
Dirt 3	8	1			
Dollar Dash (Arcade)	4	1			
Don King Presents: Prizefighter	2				source: mobygames.com
Doritos Crash Course 2 (Arcade)	0				source: mobygames.com= Inaccurate. Local 4 versus only
Dreamkiller	8				source: mobygames.com
Duke Nukem 3D (XBLA)	2-4	1?			8P total on mobygames.com
Easy Golf (Indie)	8	1			Community Game.
Enemy Territory: Quake Wars	16	1			Bots available for empty player slots.
F.E.A.R. 2: Project Origin	16	1			
F1 2010	10	1			12P on mobygames.com
F1 2011	16	1			
F1 2012	16	1			
F1 2013	16	1			
F1 2014	16	1			
Fairytale Fights	4				Coop
Far Cry 2	16	1			
Far Cry Instincts: Predator	16	1			
Fatal Inertia	8	1			Bots available for empty player slots.
Field and Stream	?				source: found on XLink Kai
Forza Motorsport 2	8	1			No link support in FM3 and FM4
Frontlines: Fuel of War	16	1			
Gears of War	8	2		2	8P Deathmatch: 1-2P versus per console, up to 8 consoles; 2P Coop: 1 player per console, up to 2 consoles. Click footnote for connection help
Gears of War 2	10	2		2-5	Bots available for empty player slots. 2-player Campaign co-op, and up to 5-player co-op in Horde Mode. Backwards-compatible with Xbox One. Click footnote for connection help
Gears of War 3	10	2		4-5	Bots available for empty player slots. 4-player Campaign co-op, and up to 5-player co-op in Horde Mode. While the game itself is backwards compatible, the system link mode is non-functional on Xbox One and Series consoles.
Gears of War: Judgment	10	2		4-5	Bots available for empty player slots. 4-player Campaign co-op, and up to 5-player co-op in Survival Mode. Backwards-compatible with Xbox One.System Link does not work between Xbox 360 and Xbox One due to versioning differences.
God Mode (Arcade)	4	1		4	
GRID	12				source: mobygames.com
Guardian Heroes (Arcade)	4	4			1-4 Versus, local or system link. 2P local coop
Halo: Combat Evolved Anniversary	16	4		2-4	2 player co-op in campaign, 4 player co-op in firefight mode. Anniversary Map Pack and Halo Reach cross-compatibility
Halo 3	16	4	4	4	Up to 4 in co-op play (1-2/box) System Link requires host to have Xbox Live membership.
Halo 3: ODST	16	2		4	Up to 4 consoles system link in Firefight mode.
Halo 4	16	4	16	4	Spartan Ops requires all participants have an Xbox Live Gold subscription to play, will not work offline.
Halo: Reach	16	4	16	4	Up to 4 consoles system link in fire fight mode.
Halo Wars	6	1	6	2	2 consoles in Co-Op campaign and up to 6 consoles in versus play.
Harm's Way (Arcade)	8	4			Bots available for empty player slots.
Heroes Over Europe	16	1	16		Up to 16 players versus, 1 per system. True system link, no Xbox live account or connection required.
Homefront	16	1			
Hour of Victory	12				
Ikaruga	2				source: mobygames.com (requires Xbox Live)
Inversion	?				source: found on XLink Kai
James Bond 007: Blood Stone	?				source: found on XLink Kai
James Bond: Quantum of Solace	12	1			
Jimmie Johnson's Anything with an Engine	8	4			Bots available for empty player slots.
Jump Duck (Indie)	16				source: mobygames.com
Kane & Lynch: Dead Men	8	1			Minimum of 4 players.
Kane & Lynch 2: Dog Days	8	1			Only 1 per console in a system link game. Minimum of 4 players, Multiplayer Games Only, no co-op Story. 12P per mobygames.com
Left 4 Dead	8	2	8	4	8 players in versus mode with 2 per console, 4 players in any other mode with 2 per console.
Left 4 Dead 2	8	2	8	4	2 per console in coop and versus
Legendary	8	1			
Little Racers Street (Indie)	12				source: mobygames.com
Lord of the Rings: War in the North	3	2	0	3	
Lost Planet: Extreme Condition	16	1			"Colonies Edition" only.
Lost Planet 2	16	1	16	4	
Lumines Live (Arcade)	2	1			
Mad Riders (Arcade)	12	1			
Marathon Durandal (Arcade)	8	4		8	This game is known on other platforms as Marathon 2: Durandal. Coop is a team battle; there is no campaign.
Midnight Club: Los Angeles	16	1			
MLB 2K7	2				source: mobygames.com
Monster Madness: Battle for Suburbia	16	1	16	16	System link coop is survival only. Local 4 player shared screen includes vs, survival coop and story coop.
MotoGP '06	16	1	4		
MotoGP '07	16				source: mobygames.com
MX vs. ATV Reflex	12	1			
MX vs. ATV Untamed	12				source: mobygames.com
N+ (Arcade)	2	1			4P per mobygames.com
Nail'd	12				
Operation Flashpoint: Dragon Rising	4	1		4	4 player co-op available for full campaign & Fire Team Engagements. 1 player per console.
Operation Flashpoint: Red River	4	1	0	4	4 player co-op available for full campaign & Fire Team Engagements. 1 player per console.
Opposites (Indie)	2				source: mobygames.com
Otomedius G	3	1			
Perfect Dark Zero	32	4	4		
PES 2011: Pro Evolution Soccer	8				source: mobygames.com
Portal 2	2	1			
Prey	8				
Project Gotham Racing 3	8	1			
Project Gotham Racing 4	8	2			
Puzzle Quest: Challenge of the Warlords (Arcade)	14				source: mobygames.com
Puzzle Quest: Galactrix (Arcade)	14				source: mobygames.com
*Quake Arena Arcade	?16	?1	?16		Multiplayer requires Xbox Live. Bots available for Multiplayer
Quake 4	8	1			
*Quake II	?16	?4			You need Xbox live gold account on each console to be able to use the system link or it won't work.
Qubed (Arcade compilation)	12				source: mobygames.com
R.I.P.D. The Game	?				source: found on XLink Kai
Race Pro	12				source: mobygames.com
Race Driver: GRID	12	1			No player limit setting. (Sometimes can't see any session)
Raven Squad: Operation Hidden Dagger	2	1			Complete campaign playable in co-op.
Red Dead Redemption	8	1			Need updates on each games to play.
Red Faction: Guerrilla	16	1			
Resident Evil 5	4	1		2	
Resident Evil 6	4	1		2	
Resident Evil: Revelations	2	1		2	
Rocket Riot (Arcade)	8	1			There is also a 4 player local coop mode.
*Sacred 2: Fallen Angel	?2	?1	0	?2	Offline Coop: 1-2; Online Coop: 2-4. ?[To play via LAN, both players must be signed into Xbox live with Gold accounts.]
Saints Row	12	1			
Saints Row 2	12	1		2	
Saints Row: The Third	2	1		2	Needs an Online Pass to activate system link
Saints Row IV	2	1		2	Needs an Online Pass to activate system link
Scrap Metal (Arcade)	4	1			
SCORE International Baja 1000	?				source: found on XLink Kai as Baja 1000
Scourge: Outbreak	8	1	8	4	
Section 8 (video game)	16	1		16	Coop modes are human versus human, human vs bots, human and bots vs bots. You can host your own server through Xbox live (32P) (Xserver).
*Section 8: Prejudice (Arcade)					Unless Live enables System Link, there is no system link. Previous information was 16 players, 1 per box, Bots available for empty player slots.
Shadowrun	16	1			Bots available for empty player slots.
Shaun White Snowboarding	16				source: mobygames.com
Sid Meier's Civilization Revolution	4				source: mobygames.com
Skulls of the Shogun (Arcade)	4				source: mobygames.com
Sol Survivor (Arcade)	8				
Soldier of Fortune: Payback	12				source: mobygames.com
Soltrio Solitaire (Arcade)	2	1			
Spec Ops: The Line	8	1	8	2	
Star Trek: DAC	12				source: mobygames.com
Stormrise	8	1			
Stuntman: Ignition	8	2			
Take Arms (Indie)	8				source: mobygames.com
Tank Negotiator (Indie)	4				source: mobygames.com
Ten Thousand (Indie)	16	1		0	No coop. No split screen. Just VS. 1P per console.
Tenchu Z	4	1			
The Chronicles of Riddick: Assault on Dark Athena	12				source: mobygames.com
The Club	8	1			
The Co-op Zombie Game (Indie)	4				source: mobygames.com
The Co-op Zombie Game 2 (Indie)	4				source: mobygames.com
The Darkness	8	1			
The Dishwasher: Dead Samurai	2	1			
The Orange Box (Team Fortress 2)	16	1			Team Fortress 2 only.
The Outfit	8	2	8	2	
The Price is Right: Decades	4				source: mobygames.com
TimeShift	16	1			
Tom Clancy's Ghost Recon Advanced Warfighter	16	4		2	Limited to first person mode when more than one player is using a console.
Tom Clancy's Ghost Recon Advanced Warfighter 2	16	4			Limited to first person mode when more than one player is using a console.
Tom Clancy's Ghost Recon: Future Soldier	16	1	2	4	2P local coop. 4P system link. 4 players can play splitscreen on two consoles for guerilla mode only. Local co-op play is limited to the Guerilla mode
Tom Clancy's HAWX	8	1			
Tom Clancy's HAWX 2	8	1			
Tom Clancy's Rainbow Six: Vegas	16	1			
Tom Clancy's Rainbow Six: Vegas 2	16	1	16	2	4 player coop for Terrorist Hunt mode. (2P Coop Campaign splitscreen or System Link) C
Tom Clancy's Splinter Cell: Chaos Theory	4				source: mobygames.com
Tom Clancy's Splinter Cell: Conviction	2	1			
Tom Clancy's Splinter Cell: Double Agent	6	1			
Toy Soldiers: Cold War (Arcade)					source: mobygames.com = Incorrect. 2P local split screen coop.
Turning Point: Fall of Liberty	8				source: mobygames.com
Ultimate Dodgeball (Indie)	2				source: mobygames.com
Undertow (Arcade)	16	2	16	2	
Unreal Tournament 3	16	2			Bots available for empty player slots.
Vancouver 2010 Winter Olympics	4	1	4		source: found on XLink Kai
Viva Piñata: Trouble in Paradise	4	1			
Way of the Exploding Balls (Indie)	2				source: mobygames.com
Wordzy (Indie)	2				source: mobygames.com
World Series of Poker 2008: Battle for the Bracelets	21	1	21		
World Series Poker: Tournament of Champions	16				source: mobygames.com
World War II: Pacific Conflicts	8				source: mobygames.com
XCOM: Enemy Unknown	2	1			
XCOM: Enemy Within	2	1			
Xtreme Polygon (Indie)	16				source: mobygames.com
Zombie Defense Squad (Indie)	4				source: mobygames.com

== See also ==
- List of Xbox System Link games
- List of Xbox 360 games
- List of Xbox games
- Lists of video games
- List of cooperative games for the Xbox 360
