= XLink Kai =

Program allowing for online play of video games

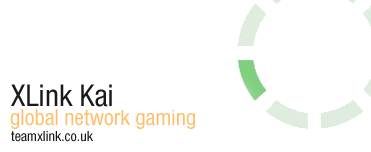
- Developer: Team XLink
- Release: March 13, 2003; 23 years ago
- Stable release: 7.4.45 / 02 November 2023
- Written in: C++
- Operating system: Windows, Linux, macOS, Raspberry Pi OS
- Available in: 11 languages
- List of languages Chinese (Simplified), Chinese (Traditional), Dutch, English, French, German, Japanese, Korean, Polish, Russian, Spanish
- License: Proprietary
- Website: Official website

XLink Kai is a program developed by Team XLink allowing for online play of video games with support for LAN multiplayer modes. It enables players on the GameCube, Nintendo Switch, PlayStation 2, PlayStation 3, PlayStation 4, PlayStation Portable, PlayStation Vita / PlayStation TV, Xbox, Xbox 360, and Xbox One to play games across the Internet using a network configuration that simulates a local area network (LAN). It notably also allows original Xbox games to be played online again following the Xbox Live shutdown on 21 April 2010 (similar to that of Save Nintendo Wi-Fi for the Wii) and certain GameSpy titles such as Saints Row 2 to be played online after the GameSpy network shutdown on 31 May 2014.

== Summary ==
The purpose of the software is to allow consoles to network with each other over the internet via the consoles' "local network play" capabilities. XLink Kai acts as tunneling software, installed to a compatible Microsoft Windows, macOS, or Linux computer on the same network as the console. Upon the console initiating a game's "network play" feature, the console's requests are routed to the computer. XLink, listening for these requests, allows other consoles to be found over the internet during this search, making it appear to the player's console that these other consoles are simply connected to the local network.

For modified ("modded") Xbox consoles, much of the functionality can be provided directly within the Xbox Media Center (XBMC for Xbox) GUI. The Kai client is still required to be running on a computer on the user's network, but players can control connections directly through the console. It is also possible to run the Kai client on other Linux-based devices, such as Raspberry Pi or NAS devices.

== Usage ==
Users log onto XLink's servers using an XTag username, similar to a "Gamertag" for Xbox Live. XLink has "Arenas" for each compatible System Link game, with more popular games such as Halo 2 and SOCOM II having sub-arenas based on regions within them as an attempt to minimize lag. Players in these arenas will be automatically synced to each other, simulating a LAN connection and thus able to play games normally using System Link functions. In addition to Game Arenas, Kai has a general chat room and a Quarantine Arena in which moderators can isolate abusive players. XLink also lets players create their own self-moderated Private Arenas.

== Features ==
XLink Kai supports GameCube, Nintendo Switch, Wii, Wii U, PlayStation 2, PlayStation 3, PlayStation 4, PlayStation Portable, PlayStation Vita, Xbox, Xbox 360, and Xbox One LAN enabled games. It features integrated chat lobbies in which players can meet and converse prior to starting a game session. Clan, tournament and ladder lobbies are also integrated for some games. A list of compatible games can be found on the Team-XLink website. Special considerations have been made for the Xbox 360, which is designed by Microsoft to be incompatible with this kind of software. The console will automatically drop connections if the ping is > 30 milliseconds in a system link connection. However, a patch has been released to bypass this limit on modified consoles. At one point support for the Nintendo DS was planned but was never completed.

As of release 7.4.37 direct connection with emulators is supported, specifically Dolphin version 5.0-12233 and higher.

XBMC for Microsoft's Xbox console has a control client for XLink Kai that allows control of the XLink Kai software program from the user's Xbox via XBMC GUI. MC360 is a skin for XBMC by Blackbolt that gives the XLink Kai client (XBMC-Live) a familiar interface resembling the Xbox 360's factory dashboard and Xbox Live's connectivity for friends, arenas, etc. XLink Kai was removed from XBMC builds 14099 and later.

== See also ==
- Hamachi
- Insignia (Xbox)
- List of Xbox System Link games
- List of Xbox 360 System Link games
- List of PlayStation 2 LAN games
