= System Link =

Form of offline multiplayer gaming

System Link is a form of offline multiplayer gaming on the Xbox and Xbox 360 gaming console over a LAN (local area network). A network switch and standard straight-through Ethernet cables may be used to link multiple consoles together, or two consoles can be connected directly. Connecting two Xbox consoles to each other without a switch requires a crossover cable, while Xbox 360 consoles can use standard cables. On the Xbox One, if one's console will not connect to their home Wi-Fi system, the best thing they can do is to factory reset the console and change their DNS resolver when the console is restarted and refreshed.

One copy of each game for each Xbox console is required to use System Link. Each game must be an identical release, with or without identical bonus and/or downloadable content. Some Platinum Hits discs will not link with non-Platinum Hits discs.

The purpose of this is to have multiplayer gameplay on multiple consoles, which allows for a non-split screen multiplayer gaming experience and far more players in one game than a single console can support. Halo: Combat Evolved allows up to 16 players on split screens on four consoles to partake in a simultaneous 16-player game. Later, post-Xbox Live games such as Halo 2 and Unreal Championship supported more consoles per game than the maximum of four supported by Halo. While "system link" was popularized by the pre-Xbox Live era Xbox games, the capability has been used for years in computer gaming. The primary advantage of system link is to allow users to host their own games and control the settings. System link can be visualized as an Xbox being used as a small server and "hosting" other Xboxes.

System Link also allows for Virtual Private Networks (VPNs) to take place, which allows LAN to take place over the internet.

The Xbox 360 can not only use wired Ethernet to connect to a LAN, but also use a wireless adapter (such as the Xbox 360 Wireless Network Adapter in an access point-based or mesh network). Additionally, some Xbox Live titles like Halo 3 can play a match with players connected over Xbox Live and on the same LAN.

In 2017, it was announced that Xbox One would also get backwards compatibility with Xbox games.

== See also ==
- List of Xbox System Link games
- List of Xbox 360 System Link games
