= NFL Fever 2000 =

1999 video game

- Cover featuring Mark Brunell
- Developer: Microsoft Game Studios
- Publisher: Microsoft Game Studios
- Series: NFL Fever
- Platform: Windows
- Release: NA: August 26, 1999
- Genre: Sports
- Modes: Single-player, multiplayer

NFL Fever 2000 is an American football video game published and developed by Microsoft Game Studios for Windows in North America on August 26, 1999. The game was followed by NFL Fever 2002.

== Reception ==
Reception

Aggregate score
Aggregator	Score
GameRankings	79%

Review scores
Publication	Score
AllGame	2.5/5
CNET Gamecenter	8/10
Computer Games Strategy Plus	3/5
Computer Gaming World	4/5
GamePro	4/5
GameSpot	7/10
GameZone	8.9/10
IGN	8/10
PC Accelerator	7/10
PC Gamer (US)	74%

The game received favorable reviews according to the review aggregation website GameRankings.

It was nominated for Computer Gaming World's "Sports Game of the Year" award, which went to High Heat Baseball 2000.
