= NFL Fever 2002 =

2001 video game

- Cover art featuring Peyton Manning
- Developer: Microsoft Game Studios
- Publisher: Microsoft Game Studios
- Series: NFL Fever
- Platform: Xbox
- Release: NA: November 15, 2001
- Genre: Sports
- Modes: Single-player, multiplayer

NFL Fever 2002 is an American football video game published and developed by Microsoft Game Studios. It was released in North America on November 15, 2001 as a launch title for the Xbox video game console. The game was preceded by NFL Fever 2000 (which was for Microsoft Windows only), and was followed by NFL Fever 2003.

== Reception ==
Reception

Aggregate score
Aggregator	Score
Metacritic	79/100

Review scores
Publication	Score
AllGame	3.5/5
Electronic Gaming Monthly	6/10 (Note: Three critics of Electronic Gaming Monthly gave the game each a score of 5.5/10, 6.5/10, and 6/10.)
EP Daily	8.5/10
Game Informer	8.25/10
GameRevolution	B+
GameSpot	7.9/10
GameSpy	4/5
GameZone	8.5/10
IGN	7.9/10
Next Generation	5/5
Official Xbox Magazine (US)	9.1/10
X-Play	4/5

The game received "generally favorable reviews" according to the review aggregation website Metacritic. NextGen said that the game "might be the 'out of nowhere' system seller that NFL 2K1 was for Dreamcast."

The game was nominated at The Electric Playground's 2001 Blister Awards for "Best Console Sports Game" and "Xbox Game of the Year", but lost to Madden NFL 2002 and Halo: Combat Evolved, respectively.

By July 2006, the game had sold 600,000 units and earned $26 million in the U.S. NextGen ranked it as the 99th highest-selling game launched for the PlayStation 2, Xbox or GameCube between October 2000 and July 2006 in that country. Combined sales of the NFL Fever series reached 1.2 million units in the United States by July 2006. NFL Fever 2002 sold 1 million units.
