= NHL Rivals 2004 =

2003 video game

- Developer: Microsoft Game Studios
- Publisher: Xbox Sports Network
- Platforms: Xbox, Xbox Live
- Release: NA: 21 November 2003
- Genre: Sports
- Modes: Single-player, multiplayer

NHL Rivals 2004 is an ice hockey video game developed by Microsoft Game Studios and published by Xbox Sports Network for Xbox in 2003 and 2004.

== Development and release ==
NHL Rivals was developed by the internal Sports and Racing Games Group of Microsoft Game Studios. In 2000, Microsoft announced it was creating a hockey game for the Xbox, making it the earliest internally developed title confirmed to be in development for the console prior to launch. Studio manager Kevin Browne stated the game's title was intended to channel the "intense rivalries that teams and fans have with each other" in the NHL, with the game's competitive Xbox Live modes, faceoffs and man-to-man roles designed to facilitate this theme. Microsoft showcased the game at E3 in May 2003, and the Leipzig Games Convention the same year. The game was one of four titles launching the Microsoft sports game lineup for 2004, including Links 2004, NFL Fever 2004 and NBA Inside Drive 2004. It was the third game released under the XSN Sports brand, a series of games marketed with extended compatibility for matchmaking and leaderboards on Xbox Live. The cover of NHL Rivals features Detroit Red Wings professional hockey player Steve Yzerman, who participated in promotional interviews for the game.

NHL Rivals was released on 21 November 2003, with the XSN Sports capabilities going live on 5 February 2004. The game was included as one of several XSN Sports titles announced as part of the XSN Sports World Championship in February 2004. It was the first and only title to be released under the NHL Rivals series, with Microsoft discontinuing the XSN Sports brand in 2004, and terminating the development team from the studio in August of that year. The code and engine for the game, among other Microsoft sports titles, was acquired by Ubisoft in 2005.

== Reception ==
Reception

Aggregate score
Aggregator	Score
Metacritic	65/100

Review scores
Publication	Score
4Players	78%
Electronic Gaming Monthly	4.67/10 (Note: Three critics of Electronic Gaming Monthly gave the game each a score of 3.5/10, 4/10, and 6.5/10.)
Game Informer	5.75/10
GameSpot	6.2/10
GameSpy	3/5 stars
GameZone	8.2/10
IGN	6.5/10
Jeuxvideo.com	14/20
Official Xbox Magazine (US)	7/10
TeamXbox	6.2/10
X-Play	2/5 stars
BBC Sport	65%
Maxim	5/5 stars

The game received "mixed" reviews according to the review aggregation website Metacritic. GamePro said of the game, "There's room to improve, but Microsoft's first try is a quality effort. It's worth checking out with gameplay that sticks with you, and online variety is the icing on top. Give it a shot." (Note: GamePro gave the game two 4/5 scores for graphics and control, 4.5/5 for sound, and 3.5/5 for fun factor.)
