= Nerjyzed Entertainment =

Nerjyzed Entertainment, LLC
- Company type: Private
- Industry: Software & Programming
- Founded: 2003; 23 years ago
- Defunct: 2010
- Headquarters: Baton Rouge, Louisiana, USA
- Key people: Jacqueline S. Beauchamp
- Website: http://www.nerjyzed.com

Nerjyzed Entertainment, LLC (NE) was a privately held video game and 3D animation development and publishing company founded in 2003, and headquartered in Baton Rouge, Louisiana. Nerjyzed is responsible for the development of their 1st and only game Black College Football: BCFX: The Xperience, the first video game to solely feature sports teams from Historically Black Colleges & Universities (HBCU's). The founding members of Nerjyzed hold undergraduate and graduate degrees from HBCUs.

Nerjyzed was the first videogame company to be certified as a participant in Louisiana's digital media tax incentive program.

According to several reputable news sources, Nerjyzed began experiencing financial problems in 2009 and ultimately stopped paying employees.
