= XSN Sports =

Video game series

- Genre: Sports
- Developer: Various
- Publisher: Microsoft Game Studios
- Platform: Xbox
- First release: NFL Fever 2004; 26 August 2003
- Latest release: Rallisport Challenge 2; 17 May 2004

XSN Sports (also known as Xbox Sports Network) is a series of sports video games published by Microsoft Game Studios for the Xbox over 2003 to 2004 using an online service hosted on a web page of the same name. The series reflected an attempt by Microsoft to appeal to the sports market, focusing on first-party development of games with online features facilitated by Xbox Live. Commencing on 28 August 2003, XSN Sports titles with an Xbox Live subscription were able to use a web-based service to access additional features, including an online leaderboard of scores, as well as organize tournament leagues.

Despite generally favorable critical reception of XSN Sports titles, commercial performance was not as strong as those from competitors including EA Sports and Sega Sports 2k Sports series, and Sony Sports games, leading to development of games in the series being put on hold in June 2004. Following a distribution deal for EA Sports titles to support Xbox Live, Microsoft made the decision to cease in-house development of sports titles in August 2004. In February 2005, Microsoft sold its sports games to Ubisoft. The XSN Sports website was shut down in September 2006.

== Features ==
The XSN Sports service featured a web page where players with an Xbox Live gamertag could see leaderboards of player scores and statistics from online matches of compatible games, and could set up tournaments and leagues with others. The service was free for subscribers to Xbox Live. Once logged in, players could create or join competitions with other players in the form of seasons or tournaments. Seasons were team-based competitions that followed regular season schedules, customisable from four 4 players with 6 season games to 32 players with 16 season games and additional playoffs depending on series length. Tournaments were single elimination rounds, customisable from 4 players over two games to 32 players over five games. Players could also use their Xbox Live friends list to invite players to join these events.

== History ==
XSN Sports was introduced during a period of innovation for online sports gameplay, competing with services offered by simulation sports focused publishers such as Sony's 989 Sports, EA Sports, and Sega's ESPN 2k sports, and the arcade game focused Midway Sports. XSN Sports manager Kevin Browne stated that XSN Sports was conceived during development of NFL Fever 2004 to develop ways to establish online leagues, so that players of sports games could play more regularly with others over multiple matches. The brand was revealed by Microsoft Game Studios at E3 in May 2003, with Microsoft demonstrating the use of cell phones to access game data at the event. The service coincided with the development of various improvements to Xbox Live that would facilitate the functionality of XSN Sports, including mobile device integration and improve voice chat. Microsoft signed several athletes, including Peyton Manning, Shaquille O'Neal and Anna Kournikova to contribute to the packaging and advertising of the brand.

XSN Sports went live on 28 August 2003, shortly after the release of its first title, NFL Fever 2004. In February 2004, Microsoft held a month-long XSN Sports World Championship, with entrants competing in a tournament of each of the six XSN Sports titles available at the time. The finals at the House of Blues in Los Angeles and awarding a $25,000 cash prize. Browne stated ambitions for XSN Sports to expand in 2004 to appeal to a broader audience by expanding the communication features, statistics, and integration with gameplay features, such as live commentators. The final game released was Rallisport Challenge 2 in May 2004, the first and only racing title in the series.

In June 2004, Microsoft announced that development of its annually planned XSN Sports titles for the NHL, NBA and NFL would be postponed until 2005. Browne stated that the decision came from poor market performance compared to competitors, and feedback from consumers for better games on the service. Despite initially announcing that the development teams would be retained to release titles in 2005, Microsoft closed most of its internal sports division in August 2004, resulting in the layoff of 76 staff. Further, following long-term aspirations to secure a publishing deal, Microsoft established a partnership with Electronic Arts for Xbox distribution in May 2004, including Xbox Live compatibility for its EA Sports titles. This partnership, and the growth in third-party support for the console, led Microsoft to see first-party development of Xbox sports titles as unnecessary. The XSN Sports website was shut down in September 2006.

== Games ==
Microsoft published seven titles under the XSN Sports brand, exclusively for first-party sports titles. These included:

Title	Release date
NFL Fever 2004	26 August 2003
Amped 2	28 October 2003
Top Spin	28 October 2003
Links 2004	11 November 2003
NBA Inside Drive 2004	18 November 2003
NHL Rivals 2004	18 November 2003
RalliSport Challenge 2	17 May 2004

== Reception ==
Aggregate review scores
Game	Metacritic
NFL Fever 2004	74%
Amped 2	80%
Top Spin	89%
Links 2004	80%
NBA Inside Drive 2004	71%
NHL Rivals 2004	65%
Rallisport Challenge 2	87%

The features of the XSN Sports service were mostly praised. Electronic Gaming Monthly praised the "seamless co-ordination" of the service between console and web, although critiqued the "archaic" message board and method of scheduling games. Describing the service as the "online experience to beat", NBC News praised the ambition of the service and the "easy interface". However, GameSpot had "mixed experiences" with the service, encountering issues locating leaderboards and network performance.

Most of the XSN Sports titles received average or positive reviews, to review aggregator Metacritic. Some reviews considered the service improved the game, with some describing the additional features as a highlight. However, some critics found the XSN games lineup limited or not as strong as their competitors. Many XSN Sports titles were less successful than their counterparts, with Eurogamer stating that "whilst the last run of XSN Sports offerings boosted the service's profile, rival offerings from EA and Sega trounced them both on the scorecard and at retail". Retrospectively, Retro Gamer expressed that XSN Sports was "key in the early years of the Xbox, before EA built Xbox Live support into its own sports games". Game Informer considered the series "had all the life sucked out of it with the dearth of Microsoft's first-party sports lineup".
