= NFL Fever 2003 =

2002 video game

- Xbox cover featuring Peyton Manning
- Developer: Microsoft Game Studios
- Publisher: Microsoft Game Studios
- Series: NFL Fever
- Platform: Xbox
- Release: NA: August 6, 2002; EU: November 1, 2002
- Genre: Sports
- Modes: Single-player, multiplayer

NFL Fever 2003 is an American football video game published and developed by Microsoft Game Studios. It was released in North America on August 6, 2002 and Europe on November 1, 2002 for the Xbox video game console. The game, which was also used for beta testing for Xbox Live, was preceded by NFL Fever 2002 and followed by NFL Fever 2004.

== Reception ==
Reception

Aggregate score
Aggregator	Score
Metacritic	72/100

Review scores
Publication	Score
AllGame	2.5/5
Electronic Gaming Monthly	6.17/10
Game Informer	7/10
GamePro	4/5
GameSpot	7.2/10
GameSpy	70%
GameZone	8.9/10
IGN	7.7/10
Official Xbox Magazine (US)	8.7/10
X-Play	4/5
The Cincinnati Enquirer	3.5/5
Maxim	3/5

NFL Fever 2003 received "average" reviews according to the review aggregation website Metacritic. IGN said: "In a nutshell, Fever 2003 still does everything well that its predecessor did, while merely applying bandages and not true fixes to the things its predecessor didn't do well."
