= Brian Keith Jackson =

American novelist

- Born: 1968 (age 57–58); Monroe, Louisiana, U.S.
- Education: University of Louisiana at Monroe

Brian Keith Jackson (born 1968) is an American novelist, essayist and culture writer based in Harlem, New York.

== Early life and education ==
Jackson was raised in Monroe, Louisiana, the only child of a middle-class family. He was influenced by the compassion and wisdoms bequeathed to him by his great-grandmother, whom he knew personally and who survived the end of slavery. He earned a bachelor's degree, studying journalism, from University of Louisiana in Monroe. After graduating Jackson moved to Flint, Michigan and began working on a newspaper there.

== Career ==
Jackson moved to New York in 1990 with hopes of becoming an actor. He became frustrated with the roles available to him and began playwriting to create the roles he was looking for. The first time he incorporated gay characters into his writing was in his plays, unpacking the characters as part of communities and relatable rather than a stereotypical trope. His plays were performed and read at Nuyorican Poets Cafe, La Mama, Barnes and Noble and Theatre for the New City.

Jackson has written for New York, Paper, The Observer, Nylon and various publications about art and contemporary culture. He gleans inspiration from everyday things. He began writing novels in order to "cut out the middle man" and have direct impact and trust with his audience.

Inspired by Jackson's great-grandmother's rural Southern experience, he wrote his first novel in 1997, at age 29, The View From Here (1997), which was set in 1950s Mississippi. It was compared to Alice Walker's The Color Purple and translated to French and a best seller in South Africa.

Walking Through Mirrors (1998), Jackson's second novel, is about a Black photographer returning to his home in Louisiana from New York.

Jackson wrote his The Queen of Harlem, before the Harlem's redevelopment about a man who reclaims his Black identity. It was on the artist Kehinde Wiley's ten favorite books in 2016.

== Awards ==
Jackson's first novel was completed with a fellowship from Art Matters Foundation and it won the American Library Association Black Caucus' First Fiction Award. He won a fellowship from the Millay Colony of the Arts.

== Personal life ==
Jackson is openly gay. When Jackson moved to New York he was a model for ACT UP.

Jackson has spent extensive time traveling the world. He has visited over forty-eight states and twenty-five countries, inspired by the idea that his brown skin might blend in better in other countries than in America, with its racially tumultuous past. He lived in Beijing for four years and Tunisia.

Jackson often writes essays for the monographs of his dear friend, artist Kehinde Wiley. He is a frequent collaborator and supporter of artists.

== Bibliography ==
Monographs

- Jackson, Brian Keith. The Queen of Harlem. New York : Harlem Moon, 2003. ISBN 978-0767908399 OCLC 52003177
- Jackson, Brian Keith. Walking Through Mirrors. New York : Washington Square Press,1998. ISBN 978-0671568948 OCLC 42202353
- Jackson, Brian Keith. The View from Here. New York : Washington Square Press, 1997. ISBN 978-0671568962 OCLC 38469675

Essays

- “Quiet as It's Kept.” Kehinde Wiley, by Sarah E. Lewis, ... Thelma Golden, Rizzoli, 2012. ISBN 978-0847835492 OCLC 738339312
- Jackson, Brian Keith., and Krista A. Thompson. Kehinde Wiley: Black Light. PowerHouse Books, 2009. ISBN 978-1576874868 OCLC 760717642
- "The Same, Yet Not ." Wiley, Kehinde. Kehinde Wiley - Columbus. Columbus Museum of Art, 2006. ISBN 978-0918881625 OCLC 85776525
- “How to Handle a Boy in Women's Shoes.” Freedom in This Village: Twenty-Five Years of Black Gay Men's Writing, 1979 to the Present, by E. Lynn Harris, Carroll & Graf, 2005. ISBN 978-0786713875 OCLC 57028432

Excerpts

- “Walking Through Mirrors (1998).” Black like Us: a Century of Lesbian, Gay, and Bisexual African American Fiction, by Devon W. Carbado et al., Cleis Press, 2012. ISBN 9781573447140 OCLC 751718448
- “The Queen of Harlem.” Gumbo: an Anthology of African American Writing, by Marita Golden and E. Lynn. Harris, Harlem Moon, 2002. ISBN 9780767910460 OCLC 237202511
- “The View from Here .” Shade: an Anthology of Fiction by Gay Men of African Descent, by Bruce Morrow and Charles H. Rowell, Avon Books, 1996. ISBN 9780380783052 OCLC 33666519
