= Mount Millicent =

Mountain in Utah, United States

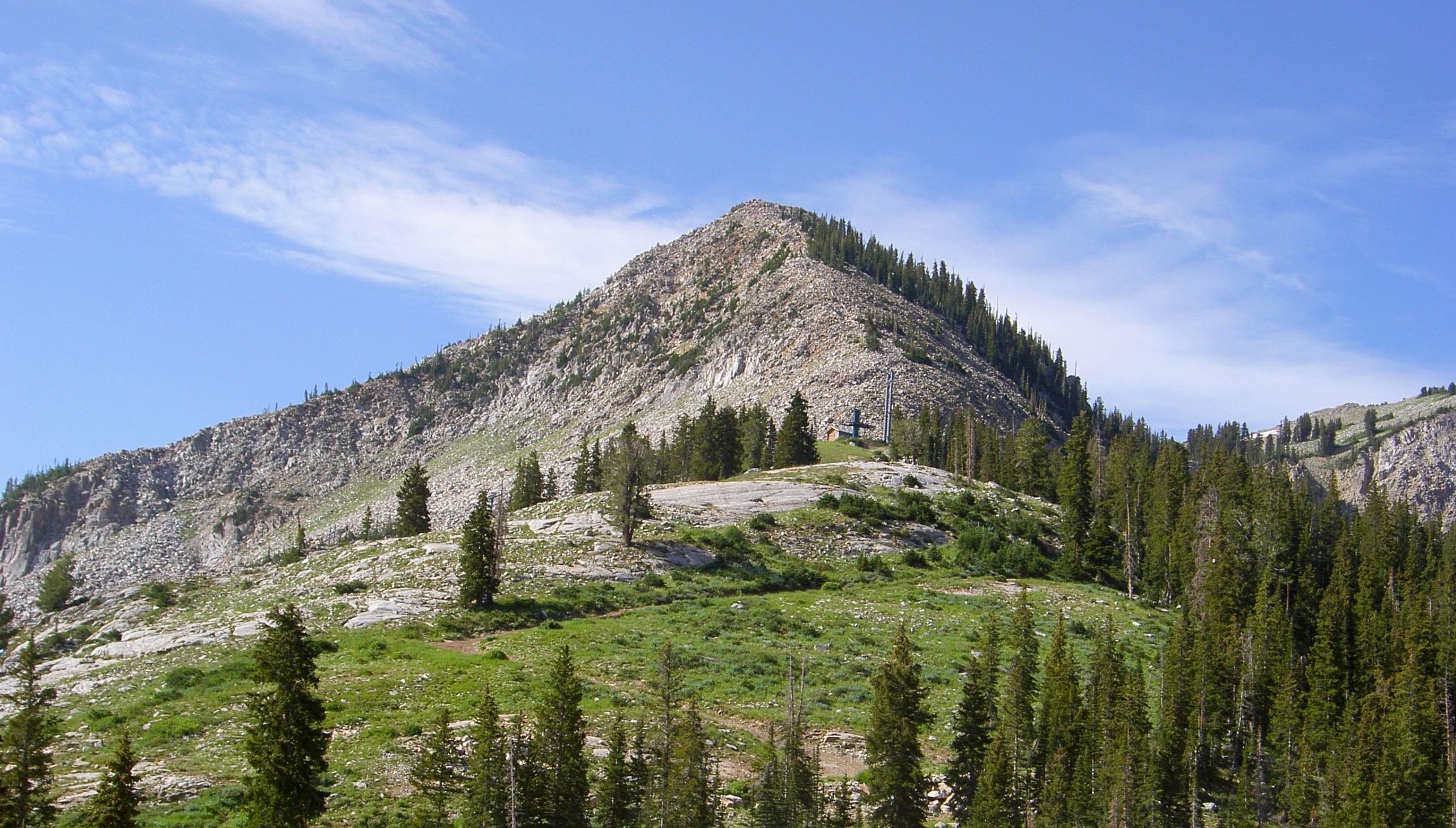
- North aspect

Highest point
- Elevation: 10,452 ft (3,186 m)
- Prominence: 192 ft (59 m)
- Parent peak: Mount Wolverine
- Isolation: 0.46 mi (0.74 km)
- Coordinates: 40°35′26″N 111°35′51″W

Geography
- Location within Utah Location within the United States
- Country: United States
- State: Utah
- County: Salt Lake
- Parent range: Wasatch Range; Rocky Mountains
- Topo map: USGS Brighton

Geology
- Rock age: 33 Ma
- Rock type: Granodiorite (Igneous rock)

Climbing
- Easiest route: class 2+ scrambling

Mount Millicent is a 10,452-foot-elevation (3,186-meter) summit in Salt Lake County, Utah, United States.

== Description ==
Mount Millicent is located 20 miles (32 km) southeast of downtown Salt Lake City at the Brighton Ski Resort in the Wasatch–Cache National Forest. The peak is set in the Wasatch Range which is a subset of the Rocky Mountains. Precipitation runoff from the mountain's slopes drains into headwaters of Big Cottonwood Creek. Topographic relief is significant as the summit rises 1,700 feet (518 meters) above Brighton in one mile (1.6 km). The mountain is composed of granodiorite of the igneous Alta stock. This mountain's toponym has been officially adopted by the United States Board on Geographic Names. The mountain was listed and depicted as one of the principal peaks of the Rockies in a book published in 1916.

== Climate ==
Mount Millicent has a subarctic climate (Köppen Dfc), bordering on an Alpine climate (Köppen ET), with long, cold, snowy winters, and cool to warm summers. Due to its altitude, it receives precipitation all year, as snow in winter, and as thunderstorms in summer.

== Gallery ==
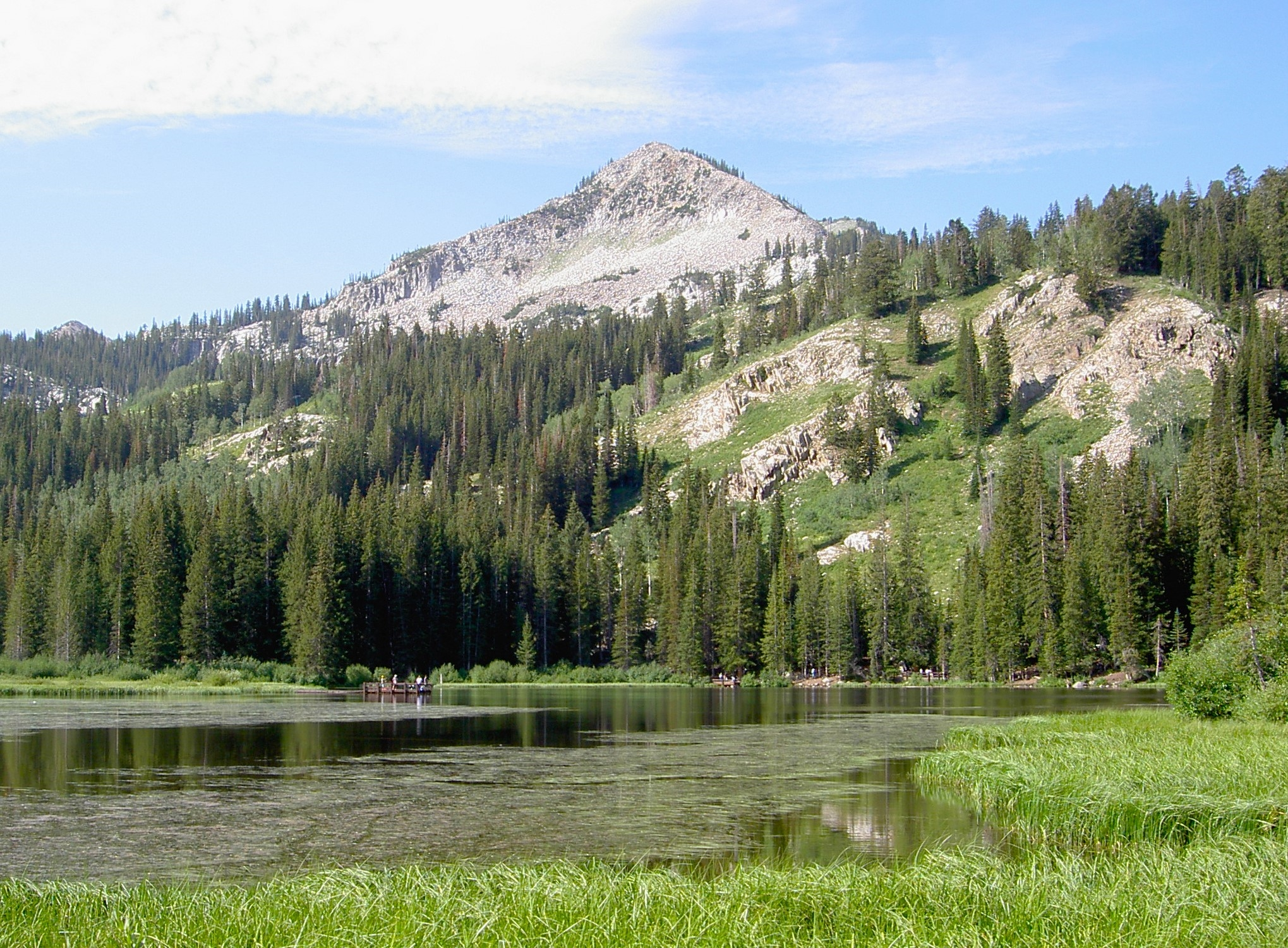
Northeast aspect with Silver Lake

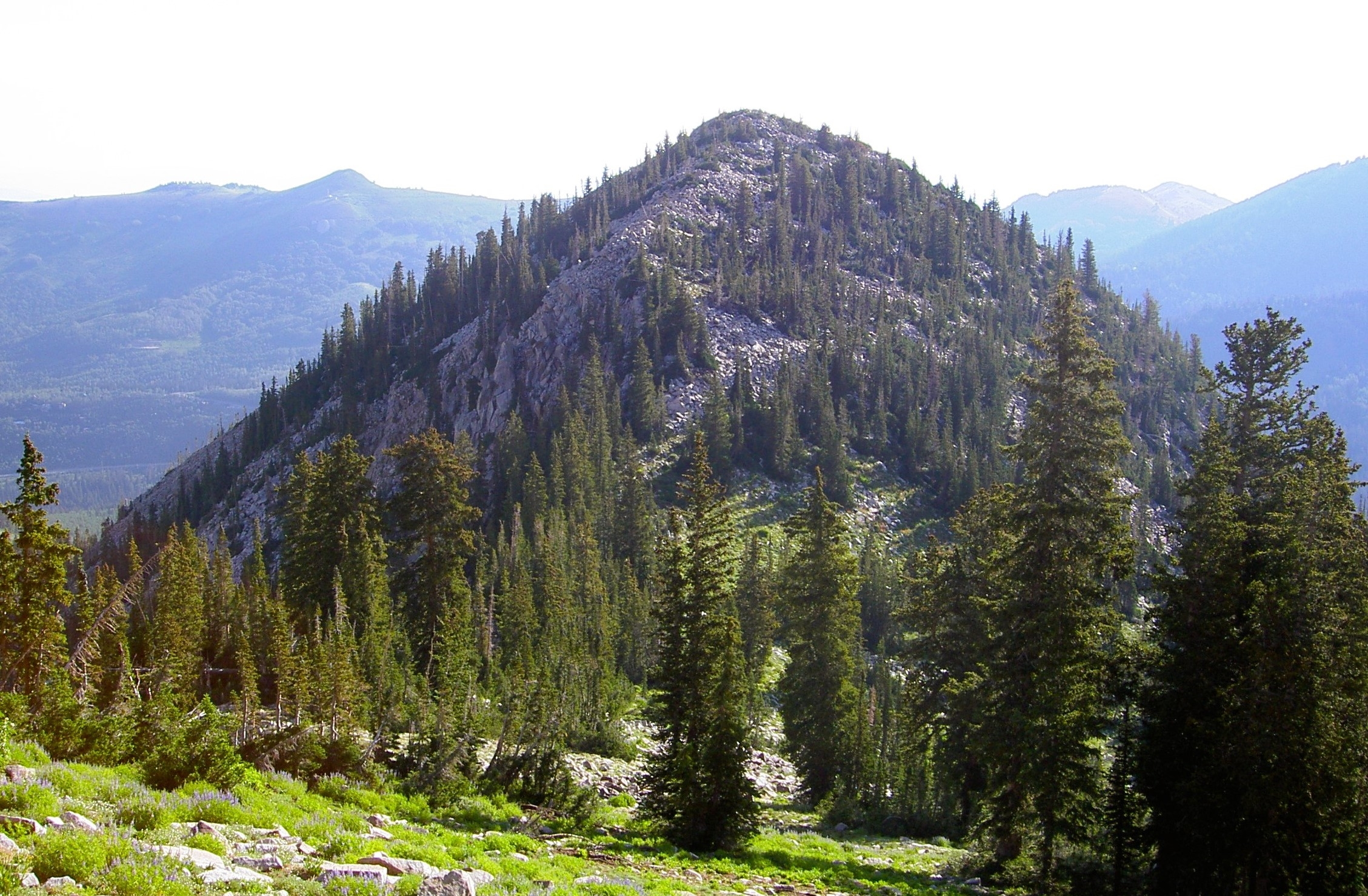
Southwest aspect

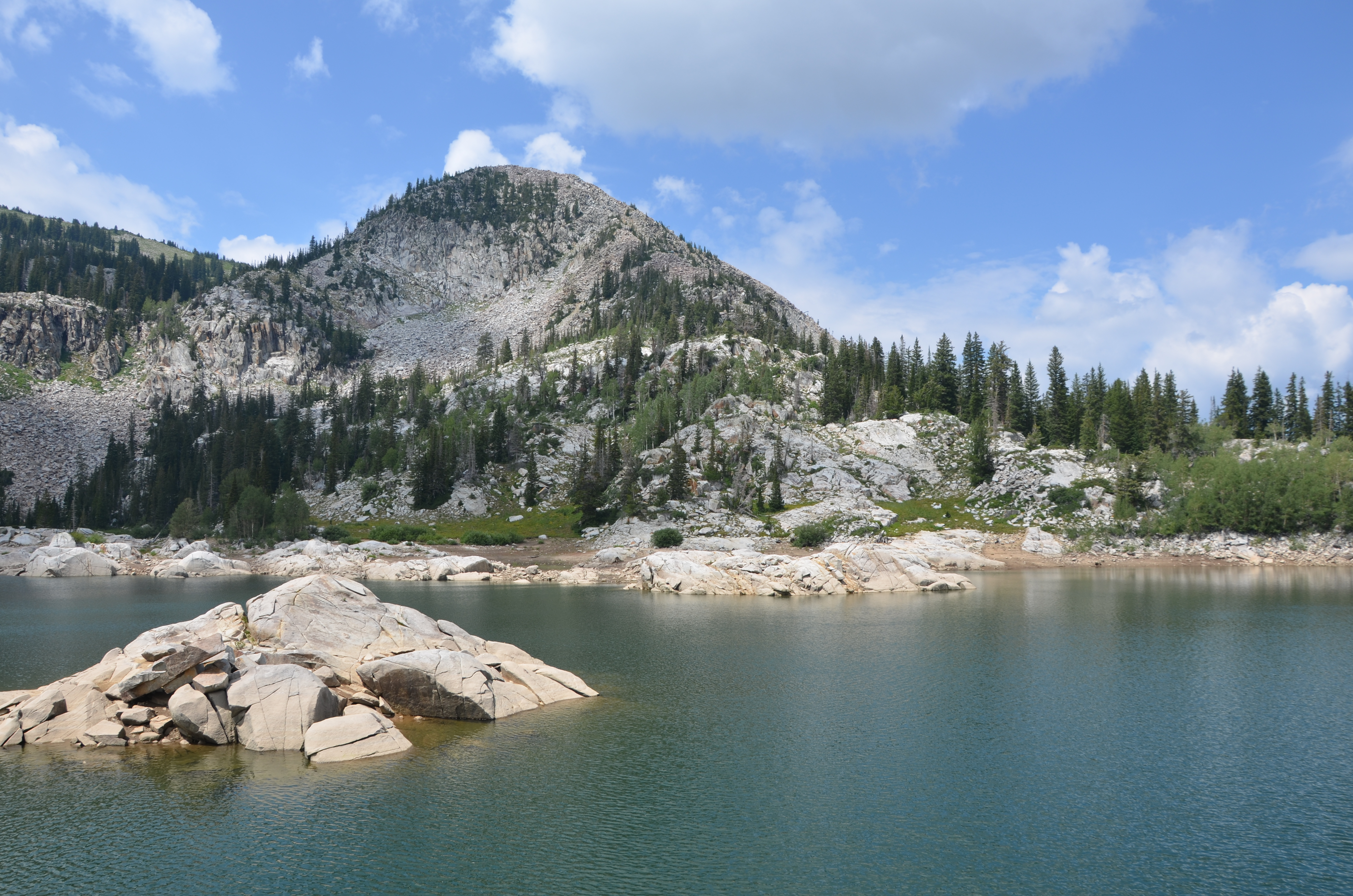
East aspect from Lake Mary

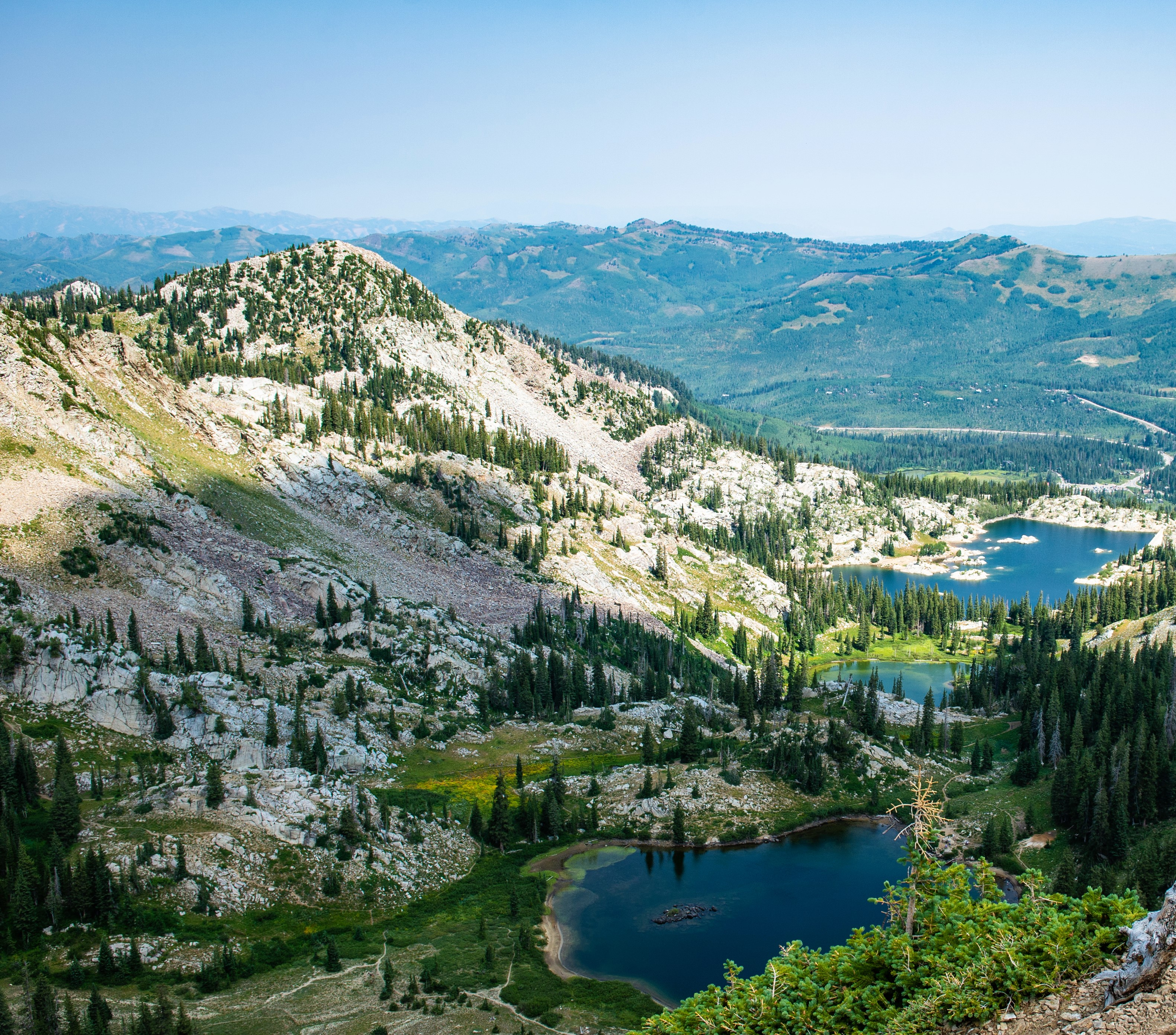
South aspect of Mount Millicent rises above Lake Catherine, Lake Martha and Lake Mary as viewed from Sunset Peak
