= Ancient Trader =

2010 video game

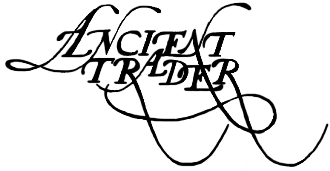
- Developer: 4Kids Games
- Publisher: 4Kids Games
- Designer: Peter Levius
- Composer: Milan Malik
- Engine: Microsoft XNA
- Platforms: iOS; Microsoft Windows; Xbox 360
- Release: Microsoft Windows, Xbox 360; 27 June 2010; iOS; 17 December 2010
- Genre: Turn-based strategy
- Modes: Single-player, multiplayer

Ancient Trader is a turn-based strategy video game developed by the Slovak studio 4Kids Games. It was released in 2010 for Microsoft Windows, Xbox Live on Xbox 360, and iOS. The player controls a ship, allowing them to explore the world and engage in trading while seeking three artifacts that will help to defeat the game's main antagonist, a sea creature called the Ancient Guardian.

The game design was influenced by board games and the video games Elite and Advance Wars. The game was developed using Microsoft XNA, and took one year to complete with a team of six people. Lead designer Peter Levius worked with the artist Petr Vcelka on the game's graphic design, and with Milan Malik on the game's score. Ancient Trader received a positive response from critics, who praised the art design and overall gameplay. A sequel, Fortune Winds: Ancient Trader, was developed by Legendo Entertainment and released in 2012 for Microsoft Windows.

== Gameplay ==
Ancient Trader is a turn-based strategy video game played from a two-dimensional perspective. The player controls a ship and seeks out three artifacts to defeat the game's final boss, a sea creature called the Ancient Guardian. The player explores the map to gather items, including tea, spices, and fruit, all of which can be found in wrecks. These can be exchanged for gold, which can be used to buy upgrades for the ship. The commodities are stored in the cargo hold, the capacity of which can be upgraded with gold.

Ancient Trader's gameplay is split in two parts. The first, turn-based strategy mode (above) is experienced while playing most of the game. The second, a card minigame (below), is triggered with a battle between the player and a non-playable character.

At the beginning of the game, the entire map is obscured until explored by the player. The map consists of a landlocked sea with several islands, wreckage, sea creatures, enemy ships, ports, and whirlpools. The player can sometimes encounter message bottles that clear away fog of war on the map to reveal hidden ports. Sea creatures and enemy ships appear randomly and challenge the player for gold or commodities in a card minigame. Ports are trading and safe zones where the player can sell commodities, buy upgrades for the ship, and take on sidequests. Whirlpools teleport the player's ship to a random location on the map.

The ship can be moved horizontally and vertically, but not diagonally. The player makes a set number of steps each turn, after which the artificial intelligence does the same for non-playable characters (NPCs). If the player's ship is not docked at a port at the end of a turn, the player can be attacked by an enemy ship or a sea creature. If they are attacked, a card minigame is triggered to decide if the player loses gold to a rival ship or cargo to a sea creature. The player and NPC draw coloured and numbered cards; the highest-numbered card wins each turn, unless presented against a powerful color. The strongest hue receives an attack bonus. The player's following turn starts after the minigame is completed.

Ancient Trader does not include a saving feature, which means that all progress is lost if the game is closed. An online multiplayer mode allows for several players to simultaneously play the same map, chase the artifacts, and defeat the Guardian. The prices of the artifacts increase as other players buy them. The players can check the wealth and artifacts gained by other players. The game also includes several alternative game modes, which focus on reaching a set total wealth or cash tally before other players. The multiplayer does not include an online scoreboard.

== Development ==
Ancient Trader is the first video game developed by the Slovakian studio 4Kids Games. The development team consisted of the lead designer Peter Levius, the artist Petr Vcelka, the game designer Miroslav Petrasko, and the programmer Andrej Vakrcka. The score was composed by Milan Malik, while Jan Ohajsky designed and animated the graphics. The game was developed using Microsoft XNA, a set of game development tools. According to Levius, Ancient Trader took around one year to finish; "most of our team members [...] were working hard on other higher priority projects at the same time". The game was submitted for XNA approval on 2 June 2010.

Ancient Trader's design was influenced by that of board games and of the video games Elite and Advance Wars. Levius and his girlfriend dedicated around two months to test and balance the game's mechanics, gathering groups of friends to play the game "without explaining anything to see if they can understand the rules and controls". He worked with Vcelka to design Ancient Trader's appearance, including paper textures and clouds. He revealed that some of the maps' features came from a scan of an old military map of present-day Slovakia. According to Chris Schilling from Eurogamer, Vcelka took inspiration from sixteenth and seventeenth-century cartography, as well as from Abraham Ortelius and his Theatrum Orbis Terrarum, to create "exceptionally detailed art".

For the Xbox 360 version, the team introduced a feature to reduce the colour saturation in the game and allow players to decide how much colour they wanted to have. Levius acknowledged that this feature "is a big thing for me and Petr as we always wanted to also have a black and white version of the game in style of Jules Verne's illustrations". He also commented that several other features, such as more animations and leaderboards, were left out due to a lack of time, but he kept them in mind for a possible sequel.

== Reception ==
Reception

Review scores
Publication	Score
Eurogamer	8/10
Pocket Gamer	2.5/5
Eurogamer Italy	8/10

Ancient Trader received positive responses from several video game journalists upon its release. Most critics praised the game's art design and gameplay, but criticized the lack of key elements such as a saving feature and scoreboards. The British magazine Edge included Ancient Trader in its 2010 list of the Best 20 Indie Games available in the Xbox Live Marketplace. They acknowledged that the game was "ambitious, devious and surprisingly hard to fault". IGN staff called it "a simple, easy entry strategy game suitable for all ages".

Tom Chick from FidGit compared Ancient Trader to video games such as The Seven Cities of Gold and Sid Meier's Pirates!, as well as to other indie games such as "the sci-fi space operettas Strange Adventures in Infinite Space and Flotilla, but wind-powered and sepia-toned". Like most reviewers, Chick highly praised the artistic design, as well as the game's atmospheric music and vividness of the environment: "It's all ink and vellum and cursive script and layers of lovingly drawn facades drawn on plywood and stacked up for a 19th Century stage production."

Eurogamer's Chris Schilling commented that although Ancient Trader was not as comprehensive and expansive as other Xbox Live titles such as Risk: Factions, it deserved "the opportunity to do business with the big boys rather than risk getting washed away with the shovelware tide". Schilling expressed concern that "a game so elegant and accomplished should have to be dredged up from the depths of Indie Games". Lorenzo Fantoni from Eurogamer Italy awarded Ancient Trader the same score as Schilling, and explained that "the final result is a quite simple title, which will last long enough to make you feel happy of having invested your money in this indie title".

Gus Mastrapa from Wired commented that Ancient Trader was well worth its price "for its art alone". He praised the game's overall style, "borrowed from centuries-old maps ... more handsome than any other game you'll find in the Xbox Live indie category".

== Sequel ==
A sequel, Fortune Winds: Ancient Trader, was developed by Swedish studio Legendo Entertainment and released in July 2012 for Microsoft Windows and Mac OS X. Fortune Winds includes improved AI, new player avatars and a save feature. GamesMaster was unimpressed with the sequel. The magazine awarded it 69 out of 100 and commented that it deviated too much from the original indie game.
