= Black College Football: BCFX: The Xperience =

- The cover of The Doug Williams Edition for the Xbox 360
- Developer: Nerjyzed Entertainment
- Publisher: Aspyr Media
- Engine: Unreal Engine 3
- Platforms: Microsoft Windows, Xbox 360
- Release: Microsoft Windows: NA: November 23, 2007; Xbox 360: NA: September 29, 2009
- Genre: Sports
- Modes: Single player, multiplayer

Black College Football Experience (BCFx) is a sports video game centered on the culture of black college football. BCFx was created by Nerjyzed Entertainment, Inc., of Baton Rouge, LA. It features Historically Black Colleges & University (HBCU) football teams from three HBCU conferences including the SWAC, SIAC, and several schools within the MEAC as well as independent HBCUs. The game features nearly 40 teams, bands, interactive halftime shows, stadiums, play-by-play commentary, and ten Classic games such as the Turkey Day Classic, Bayou Classic, Florida Classic, Atlanta Football Classic and the Southern Heritage Classic. BCFx was originally released on Windows-based PC systems in November 23, 2007. An Xbox 360 version titled "The Doug Williams Edition" was released September 29. On November 15, 2021, it was announced that BCFx would be joining the Xbox One and Xbox Series S/X backwards compatibility list.

BCFx uses the Unreal Engine 3 game engine.

== Reviews ==
BCFX reception by critics was mixed, receiving a 3.5/10 by IGN and a 5.5/10 by Official Xbox Magazine. Negative reviews claimed poor AI and gameplay implementation, while positive critiques noted that the game "looks fairly sharp" visually, and that the developer "built in a pretty entertaining playable halftime show," with a "pretty nifty in-game museum with good info on the schools, their players, and their history."
