= Blazing Angels 2: Secret Missions of WWII =

2007 video game

- Xbox 360 box art
- Developer: Ubisoft Bucharest
- Publisher: Ubisoft
- Designers: Bogdan Bridinel; William Taylor; Stefan Net
- Composer: Jason Graves
- Series: Blazing Angels
- Platforms: Microsoft Windows, PlayStation 3, Xbox 360
- Release: Xbox 360: AU: September 6, 2007; EU: September 7, 2007; NA: September 18, 2007; JP: March 19, 2008; Windows: NA: September 21, 2007; AU: September 27, 2007; EU: September 28, 2007; PlayStation 3: NA: November 6, 2007; AU: November 29, 2007; EU: November 30, 2007; JP: March 19, 2008
- Genre: Flight combat
- Modes: Single-player, multiplayer

Blazing Angels 2: Secret Missions of WWII (also known as Blazing Angels 2: Secret Missions) is a 2007 flight combat video game for Microsoft Windows, PlayStation 3, and Xbox 360, developed by Ubisoft Bucharest and published by Ubisoft. A sequel of Blazing Angels: Squadrons of WWII, the game puts the player in an elite Allied squadron trying to prevent Nazi Germany from creating a weapon of mass destruction. As the player progresses, they will travel around the world and battle the enemy with a list of prototype fighter aircraft and upgrades. Multiplayer mode includes deathmatch, cooperative, capture the flag, and epic battle.

== Plot ==
The game begins with the player taking control of Captain Robinson (the protagonist) during an airshow sometime after World War II. After performing several stunts, Robinson begins to narrate the events of his squadron. The game immediately flashbacks to a German attack on an RAF airfield, which the player must defend against. Robinson's first squadron mate, Teach, is introduced here. The two then fly to France and drop off an Allied agent, Marguerite, on a train. They then proceed to destroy numerous ground and air units before leaving. The two then link up with a carrier, the HMS Illustrious, about to launch an attack on the Italian fleet at Taranto. During the attack, Robinson manages to convince an old acquaintance of his, Milo, to join the squad. The squadron is completed when they fly to Cairo and receive a fighter jockey named Thorpe.

The four pilots repel a massive bombing wave and subsequent aerial assault. additionally, they destroy a German Zeppelin attempting to sneak away. While interrogating a downed pilot, Robinson finds out that Marguerite's cover has been blown. In Paris, Marguerite discovers this also through a childhood friend of hers, Max, who is also a German officer and pilot. While Marguerite stole some documents from the garrison, Robinson, flying alone, stealthily shot down several German fighters. When Marguerite was exposed, he eliminated roadblocks and attackers until she abandoned the car on the Champs-Élysées. Robinson landed next to her, and flew her out of Paris. The squadron reformed in Russia, where they assist the Russians in capturing a German airbase. Robinson and Teach land and steal a advanced German bomber in order to capture its bombsite. While exfiltrating they bombed two bridges in order to cover the escape of Marguerite and the Russian ground troops.

The bomber is flown to Sweden, where Robinson and Milo tested a new British defensive weapon, a flash blinder designed to blind pilots. While testing the weapon, they received a radio transmission from Marguerite and discover that her submarine was attacked and is badly damaged. While Milo flew back to notify the other pilots, Robinson located the sub by tracking its transmissions. German fighters soon arrived, though, forcing Robinson to lure them away from the sub and through the icebergs, where he would blind the pilots and cause the fighters to crash. Eventually, the rest of the squadron arrived and assisted in the downing of the remaining fighters while a merchant ship arrived to pick up Marguerite. The squadron was then ordered to Moscow in order to help defend it against an impending German attack. The squadron helped shoot down German bombers, destroy advancing armor, and direct Katyusha rocket barrages. Soon after, they discovered a massive "Dora gun" protected by an armored dome and various flack guns. When the gun fired, the pilots fired through the open doors and destroyed the gun.

The squadron then linked up with the Flying Tigers and assaulted a hidden airbase in China. Robinson and Milo both landed at the base and stole two prototype planes, a J7W Shinden, and a Me-163 Komet. They proceeded through a nearby canyon in order to avoid AA fire, and then assisted with the escape of the remaining American ground troops. Low on fuel, the squadron flew both prototype planes to Rangoon, making it right as the Japanese began their invasion of the city. Robinson was the only pilot able to get into a different plane, a Hawker Tempest, and took off in time. He quickly dispatched the bombers attacking the airfield, allowing his squadron mates to take off in their own Tempest's. The pilots then shot down numerous attacking bombers and sunk several enemy ships that were engaging the evacuation fleet. They flew where needed, destroying artillery positions, bridges, and oil refineries. Robinson and Teach flew to protect an evacuation train while Milo and Thorpe flew to protect the evacuation ships. Both the train and ships escaped, but Thorpe was shot down and captured by a Japanese destroyer. Robinson, Teach, Milo, and Marguerite flew a rescue mission, sinking several ships escorting the "hellship" that was holding several POW's (including Thorpe). Robinson then destroyed the gun towers and cargo hatch on the ship while Teach and Milo covered him from enemy fighters. Robinson then destroyed an accidentally launched torpedo, and Thorpe was rescued by an American submarine. While detained, Thorpe learned of an impending attack on San Francisco that had been masterminded by a German General of the Luftwaffe, Heinrich Von Kluge (the games primary antagonist), with the Japanese assisting him.

The squadron flew to the city and protected the Golden Gate Bridge and naval port from U-boats launching V-1 rockets. They then shot down several Japanese suicide rockets launched from a carrier submarine. When the rockets turned to attack the squadron, they forced them to crash into the carrier sub, eventually sinking it. They then flew to the Himalayas and intercepted an aerial convoy. Teach, Milo, and Thorpe hijacked a transport plane loaded with secret weapons while Robinson flew cover. Marguerite, though, was captured in the attack and her troops shot. While detained, Max managed to sneak her a weapon, allowing her to take over a train that she was being transported on. He also sent the squadron a message to apprise them of the situation.

The four pilots responded and discovered Max strafing German troops. The five pilots protected Marguerite from numerous roadblocks, enemy fighters, and an armored train until she crossed the border. Having betrayed Germany, Max joined up with the others. Robinson and Max then flew to Rome, providing air cover for Marguerite while she and her troops stole some documents for a poison gas formula before Von Kluge could get the documents. They learned of a German scientist who wanted to defect, and staged a rescue. Robinson first destroys the radar picket stations, and lead a diversionary attack with Max, Teach and Thorpe while Milo landed on the lake and dispatched Marguerite to rescue the scientist. However, the information regarding the scientist is revealed to be a trap, and the pilots covered Marguerite's escape back to the lake. Though she makes it, a Dornier Do 214, a massive floatplane equipped with a advanced Tesla coil (That Von Kluge had made advancements and adjustments to), appears and destroys Milo's plane. Max attempted a run on it, but was quickly dispatched by the tesla weapon and crashes into the lake. The other pilots force the plane down by disabling two of its engines, allowing Milo to take it over. The pilots protect the plane from an attack by German patrol boats and fighters and managed to escape.

Later, Max is captured by Von Kluge, who taunts him for joining the allies, but Max accepted his fate and is killed by German troops. The squadron then flies to a remote island and provide air cover while Marguerite sails to shore and reaches the German facility and its inner complex. While she attempts to destroy the facility, the squadron must intercept and shoot down V-2 rockets being launched. They manage to stop the first wave and Marguerite has discovered how to destroy the facility, but she is out of demo charges and her men have all been killed. Despite Robinson's protests, she orders him to fire on the fuel tanks inside the facility, something that would've probably killed her before a second wave a V-2 rockets could be launched. Robinson complies, and Marguerite manages to survive the explosion.

The squadron's final mission was to escort a massive flight of Lancaster bombers as they go to destroy a larger version of Von Kluge's tesla weapon. Though the bombers manage to annihilate the outer defenses, the entire bomber squadron is decimated by Kluge's tesla weapon, as they could not get high enough to avoid the blast. In order to destroy the weapon, the squadron eliminated the AA ground defenses around each tower. Marguerite and her team would then blow open the doors to the tunnels housing the generators. Robinson flew into each tunnel and destroyed the tesla generators. After finishing off the last one, the squadron encounters Von Kluge in a massive Daimler-Benz Project C carrier plane, revealed to be protected by a "tesla lightning shield", which would open in order to launch new Daimler-Benz Project E parasit fighters. The squadron manages to destroy the small, more advanced enemy fighters and eventually the carrier plane, killing General Von Kluge and dismantling all of his remaining Tesla weaponry. The squadron returns home and is disbanded. While Teach and Thorpe have a night on the town in London, Robinson offers to take Marguerite around the world.

== Gameplay ==
While certain missions require specific planes, the player can choose which plane to fly.

== Reception ==
Reception

Aggregate score
| Aggregator | Score | | |
| Aggregator | PC | PS3 | Xbox 360 |
|---|---|---|---|
| Metacritic | 72/100 | 70/100 | 72/100 |

Review scores
| Publication | Score | | |
| Publication | PC | PS3 | Xbox 360 |
|---|---|---|---|
| Famitsu | N/A | 30/40 | 30/40 |
| Game Informer | 7.5/10 | N/A | 7.5/10 |
| GameSpot | 7/10 | 7/10 | 7/10 |
| GameSpy | N/A | N/A | 3.5/5 |
| GameTrailers | N/A | N/A | 7.9/10 |
| GameZone | N/A | 7/10 | 7.5/10 |
| IGN | 8/10 | 7/10 | 8/10 |
| Official Xbox Magazine (US) | N/A | N/A | 8/10 |
| PC Gamer (US) | 68% | N/A | N/A |
| PlayStation: The Official Magazine | N/A | 3/5 | N/A |

The game received "average" reviews on all platforms according to the review aggregation website Metacritic. In Japan, Famitsu gave these console versions a score of one seven, one eight, one seven, and one eight for a total of 30 out of 40.

It was considered an improvement over its predecessor, given its higher scores.
