= Time Spent Driving =

- Origin: Santa Cruz, California, United States
- Genres: Emo, indie rock
- Years active: 1998–2005, 2012–present
- Members: Jon Cattivera; Derek Pabich; Bill Schneider; Garrett Smart; David Cattivera
- Past members: Kem Gallione; Jesse Buglione; Steve Borella; Jonas Davidson; Dustin Roth; James Findlay; Todd Archibald; Keith Brinkley; Mike Hicks; Jon Jamieson
- Website: www.timespentdriving.com

Time Spent Driving is an American emo and indie rock band formed in 1998 in Santa Cruz, California.

== History ==
The group was formed in 1998 in Santa Cruz, California. Time Spent Driving initially signed with Unfun Records. In November 2000, the band released the EP Walls Between Us.

Following the EP's release, the band toured Europe, performing in Germany alongside Favez and The Stereo. The group signed with Sessions Records, which re-released the EP with a revised layout. In Germany, the EP was released on vinyl via Chestnut Café Records in January 2002. In October and November 2001, the group toured the US with Favez and Scott Ritcher. A 3-way split featuring the participating artists of the tour was released through Doghouse Records. Previously, Time Spent Driving had only toured the West Coast.

On May 7, 2002, their debut album Just Enough Bright was released through Sessions Records. It was produced by J. Robbins and recorded at Tiny Telephone in San Francisco. The group toured the West Coast, and tracks from the album were broadcast on MTV. In 2003, the group announced a hiatus, followed by their dissolution in 2005. Seven tracks written for a second album were subsequently released in June 2007 through Lorelei Records as I'm Your Stab in the Back. The band reformed in 2012 and released Passed & Presence on July 21, 2015, through Cardigan Records.

In November 2023, the band released their fourth album, Estrangers, through Negative Progression Records. In 2026, Thirty Something Records began reissuing their catalog, starting with Just Enough Bright. The album was released on vinyl in April 2026, remixed by J. Robbins, mastered by Dan Coutant at Sunroom Audio, and including the previously unreleased track "What It Should Be Like." They released their fifth full length album Lost Leaves on August 21, 2026.

Currently, the group consists of Jon Cattivera (vocals, guitar), Derek Pabich (guitar), Bill Schneider (bass), Garrett Smart (drums), and David Cattivera (keyboards).

== Discography ==
=== EPs ===
- 2000: Walls Between Us (2001 re-release via Unfun Records, 2002 on vinyl via Chestnut Café Records)

=== Albums ===
- 2002: Just Enough Bright (Sessions Records)
- 2007: I'm Your Stab in the Back (Lorelei Records)
- 2015: Passed & Presence (Cardigan Records)
- 2023: Estrangers (Negative Progression Records)
- 2026: Lost Leaves (Thirty Something Records)

=== Reissues ===
- 2026: Just Enough Bright (2026 Remaster) (Thirty Something Records)

=== Compilations ===
- The Emo Diaries – Chapter 7: Me Against the World (with the track "Lowlight", Deep Elm Records)
- Translation: Music 2 (with the track "Thin Like Paper", Don Lee Records)
- Voice this Sound (with the track "Dear Shannon (Acoustic)", Inverse Records)
- Rise Records Compilation (with the track "Here With You", Rise Records)
- The Silence of Fire (with the track "Plastic Crown (Acoustic)", Burning Daisies Records)

=== Splits ===
- 2001: Thin Like Paper (3-way split with Favez and Scott Ritcher, Doghouse Records)
- 2025: A 7 Step Guide To Happiness (7-way split with Her Head's On Fire, Neckscars, Hotlung, Shotclock, Bear Away, and Hauntu, Sell The Heart Records)
