= NFL Fever =

Video game series

NFL Fever is an American football video game series published and developed by Microsoft Game Studios. In February 2005, Microsoft sold the series to Ubisoft. The franchise focused on simulation-style gameplay to try to replicate authentic NFL football gameplay. Throughout the lifespan of the franchise, generally mixed reviews led to the franchise falling short of its direct competitor, the Madden NFL franchise. Many fans of the franchise have vocalized that NFL games were more likely to improve and innovate each year in the time that there was competition to the Madden NFL series of games.

== Installments ==
| Name | Release date | Systems | Cover athlete | Team |
|---|---|---|---|---|
| NFL Fever 2000 | August 31, 1999 | Windows | Mark Brunell | Jacksonville Jaguars |
| NFL Fever 2002 | November 15, 2001 | Xbox | Peyton Manning | Indianapolis Colts |
| NFL Fever 2003 | August 6, 2002 | Xbox | Peyton Manning | Indianapolis Colts |
| NFL Fever 2004 | August 27, 2003 | Xbox | Peyton Manning | Indianapolis Colts |

== Discontinuation ==
Following Microsoft's release of their 2004 professional sports titles, all of them were discontinued, including NBA Inside Drive and NHL Rivals.
