= List of Xbox 360 games =

This is a list of Xbox 360 games that were released via retail disc, digital download or as part of the Xbox Live Arcade (XBLA) program. (Note: For a chronological list, click the sort button in any of the available region's columns. Games dated November 22, 2005 (North America), December 10, 2005 (Europe), December 10, 2005 (Japan), and March 23, 2006 (Australia) are launch titles for the specified regions.) There are 2,155 games across both lists. Games with the Xbox One forward compatibility identifier are also compatible with Xbox Series X and Series S (though only digital games in the case of the Series S). (Note: This number is always up to date by this script.)

== See also ==
- List of best-selling Xbox 360 video games
- List of Xbox 360 System Link games
- List of Xbox games compatible with Xbox 360
- List of Xbox games on Windows Phone
