= Blazing Angels: Squadrons of WWII =

2006 video game

- The Xbox 360 version, featuring a Spitfire mk. II flying during one of the battles of London
- Developer: Ubisoft Bucharest
- Publishers: Ubisoft; D3 Publisher (PS3)
- Composer: Jason Graves
- Series: Blazing Angels
- Platforms: Microsoft Windows, Xbox, Xbox 360, PlayStation 3, Wii, arcade
- Release: Xbox, Xbox 360, Windows: NA: March 23, 2006; NA: March 28, 2006 (PC); AU: March 30, 2006 (Xbox, X360); EU: March 31, 2006; PlayStation 3: NA: December 12, 2006; AU: March 22, 2007; EU: March 23, 2007; JP: July 5, 2007; Wii: NA: March 20, 2007; AU: March 22, 2007; EU: March 30, 2007
- Genre: Flight combat
- Modes: Single-player, multiplayer

Blazing Angels: Squadrons of WWII is a flight combat video game for Microsoft Windows, Xbox, Xbox 360, PlayStation 3 and Wii. It was developed by Ubisoft Bucharest during the second fiscal quarter of 2006 for both the North American and European regions. The game features 46 different World War II fighter planes and allows the player or players to take part in several World War II events as a fictional squadron. Online support allows 16 players to take part in head-to-head and co-operative battles.

The Wii version was released in March 2007. The PlayStation 3 version came as a launch title in December 2006 for North America and March in 2007 for other markets, while Japanese version came in July. This version features all-new missions, a 16-player online mode and support for PS3 controller's motion sensing functions. In line with other online-enabled games on the original Xbox version, multiplayer on Xbox Live was available to players until 15 April 2010. A sequel, Blazing Angels 2: Secret Missions of WWII, was released in 2007.

The arcade version of Blazing Angels: Squadrons of WWII was developed by Global VR and released in 2008, based upon the Windows version of the game. The initial arcade cabinet was a sit-down model that used a flight stick and throttle control scheme as well as a seat thumper to simulate the plane being shot at. An up-right model followed in 2011.

== Characters ==
The Angels of Dunkirk is the name of the player's squadron in the game. It is made up of the player, Tom "the shield", Joe "the mechanical wizard" and Frank "the hunter". The player's name is not revealed in the game, but some pilots call him "Captain". Also featured is a German Ace, that the player first encounters during the Battle of Britain, throwing insults at the squadron. He appears again in the final mission of the game, 1945 Berlin leading the Nowotny Squadron also known as Jagdgeschwader 7, a squadron of elite German aces flying the experimental jet planes Germany was trying to create. The Ace is shot down by the player when he nearly kills Tom.

== Story ==
=== Setting ===
The story varies slightly from console to console. The story followed the player's squadron, nicknamed the Angels of Dunkirk, as they go through various World War II battles and missions. Battles include the Battle of Britain, the Liberation of Paris, The Battle of Midway, D-Day, and the Battle of Berlin. In the Wii and PS3 releases, the story changed slightly, adding more depth to the characters. Scenes narrated by the main character were added before the level to explain the battle. The player also talks during the actual game, shouting commands and conversing with the wingmen. Other changes included Tom being Joe's brother-in-law instead of a random pilot the player saves from a German fighter squadron and Joe getting shot down on D-Day.

=== Plot ===
The game begins in Britain, 1940, where several American pilots volunteer with the Royal Air Force to take part in the ongoing war against Germany. One of them, the player, known as the Captain, is training alongside squad mate Joe, when they suddenly find a fellow pilot named Tom being attacked by German fighters. The Captain rescues Tom, who turns out to be Joe's brother-in-law.

The Captain, along with his squadron consisting of Tom, Frank and Joe, end up fighting in battles against the Germans, first by helping defend Allied forces at Dunkirk and then repelling German attacks on Britain, including a battle over London, where they encounter a German air ace. The squad is then sent to North Africa, where, after the Captain provides a reconnaissance mission on German positions, he and his squadron fight fiercely to help cover British forces assaulting German lines in a vicious battle in the Libyan desert. After this, the squadron is sent back to the United States to help train American pilots.

As they are stationed in Hawaii, the Japanese Imperial Navy launches a surprise attack on Pearl Harbor, and the infuriated squadron assists in angrily repelling the attack. With the United States now fully committed in the war against Japan, the squadron is sent on several missions against Japanese forces in the Pacific. First, they embark on a mission to destroy a Japanese convoy, including a carrier, in the Coral Sea and then they fight in the Battle of Midway, defending an airfield from Japanese air attacks and then covering bombers from swarms of A6M Zeroes as they destroy a large Japanese fleet. After fending off Japanese amphibious attacks and destroying a Japanese battleship in the fighting for Guadalcanal, the squadron is sent to assist US landings at New Georgia, defending them from enemy planes and destroying Japanese tanks and bunkers. Finally, the squadron is sent to assault the main Japanese South Pacific base of Rabaul, covering US bombers in destroying an airfield before the squadron then decimates the rest of the Japanese base.

With their squadron's campaign over in the Pacific, they are sent back to Europe to take part in an attack on German ships in Norway. However, Joe notices a mysterious passage in the fjords and they navigate through them to discover a secret German heavy water base, which they destroy. Afterwards, they proceed to cover the Allied landings at Normandy, and though they are successful in their endeavor, sadly, Joe is shot down and killed by a German fighter. As the squadron is mourning the loss of Joe, they continue on with the campaign in France, helping to liberate Paris by destroying German ground units in the city, allowing French forces to move through. The squadron then leads numerous US planes in a furious air battle with Luftwaffe swarms in the skies above the Ardennes during the Battle of the Bulge before commandeering bombers to destroy German factories in a bombing run while manning machine guns to take out German fighters sent to intercept them.

With the war nearing its end, the squadron is sent on one last mission into Berlin just before the Soviets strike the city. They are tasked with taking out enemy radio towers and covering an Allied bombing run. After completing this task, however, they are attacked by a squadron led by the same ace they encountered over London in new experimental jet fighters. After one last cataclysmic dogfight (including remembering Joe's advice on fixing his plane), the Captain shoots down the enemy ace and he and his squad finishes off the enemy squadron, finally ending their mission. The three are then sent home, rewarded for their service.

== Planes ==
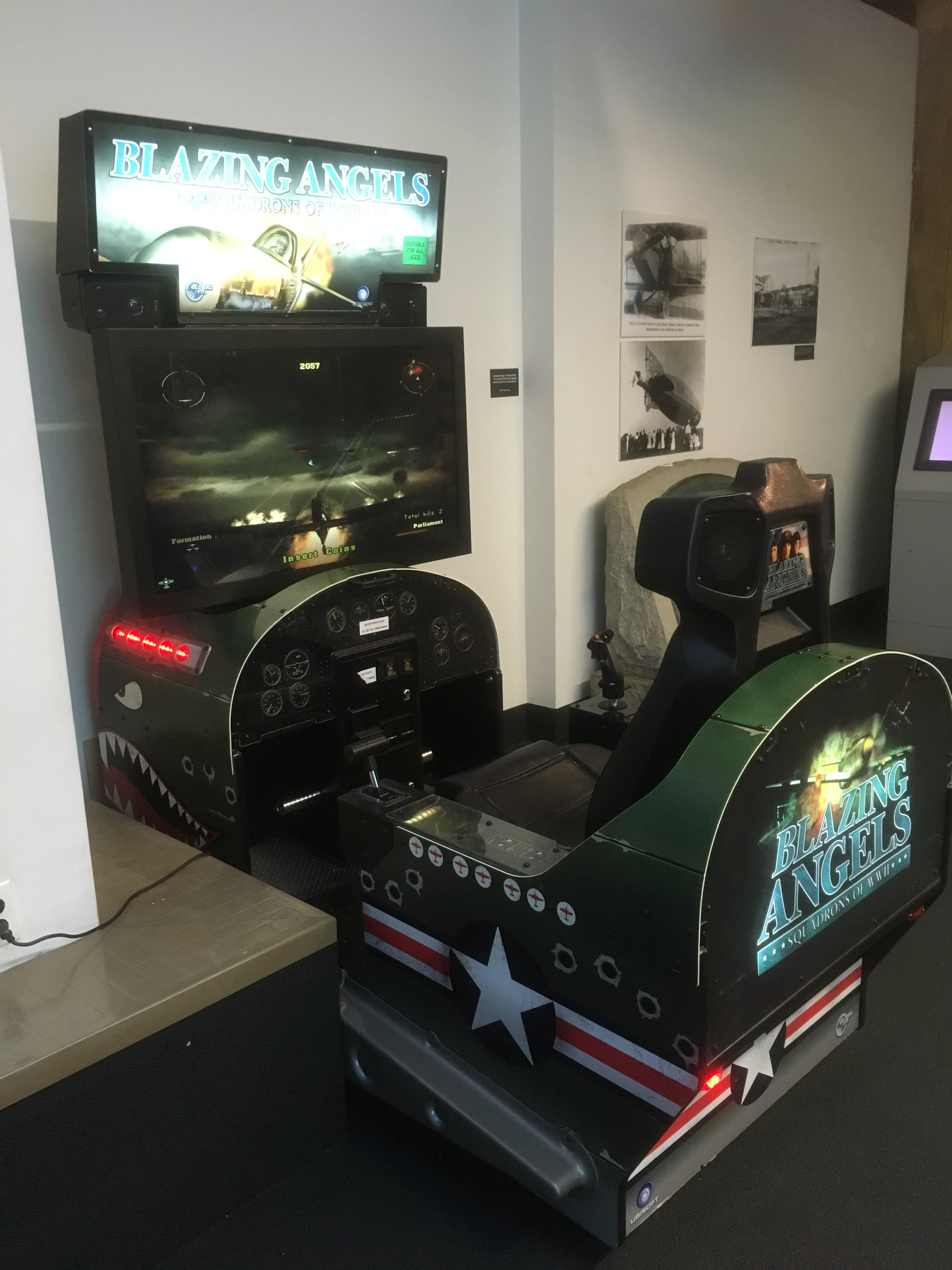
Blazing Angels was also released in a sit-down arcade cabinet version.

Blazing Angels contains 46 fighter and attack aircraft of the World War II period, each of which handles differently and are armed with their own unique weapons loadouts. Each plane is given star ratings in different categories which include firepower, speed and hitpoints. The planes are not the same in all versions of the game on different systems. For example, the Xbox 360 version of "Blazing Angels" has some planes that the Wii version doesn't have. The Wii version lets the player select the plane they want, but on the Xbox 360 version, they do not have a choice.

== Development ==
The European Windows version is protected by StarForce. At least one published American Windows version also uses StarForce. Blazing Angels: Squadrons of WWII is now playable online again on the replacement original Xbox Live servers called Insignia.

== Reception ==
Reception

Aggregate score
| Aggregator | Score | | | | |
| Aggregator | PC | PS3 | Wii | Xbox | Xbox 360 |
|---|---|---|---|---|---|
| Metacritic | 65/100 | 67/100 | 57/100 | 69/100 | 66/100 |

Review scores
| Publication | Score | | | | |
| Publication | PC | PS3 | Wii | Xbox | Xbox 360 |
|---|---|---|---|---|---|
| Electronic Gaming Monthly | N/A | N/A | N/A | N/A | 6.67/10 |
| Eurogamer | N/A | N/A | N/A | N/A | 5/10 |
| Game Informer | N/A | 7/10 | N/A | 7.5/10 | 7.5/10 |
| GamePro | N/A | 3/5 | N/A | N/A | 3.5/5 |
| GameRevolution | N/A | N/A | N/A | N/A | C+ |
| GameSpot | 6.9/10 | 6.6/10 | 6.2/10 | 6.9/10 | 6.9/10 |
| GameSpy | N/A | 3.5/5 | 2/5 | N/A | 3/5 |
| GameTrailers | N/A | N/A | N/A | N/A | 7.2/10 |
| GameZone | N/A | 6.8/10 | 6/10 | N/A | 7.4/10 |
| IGN | 6.8/10 | 7/10 | 5.7/10 | 6.8/10 | 6.8/10 |
| Nintendo Power | N/A | N/A | 7/10 | N/A | N/A |
| Official Xbox Magazine (US) | N/A | N/A | N/A | 7.5/10 | 7.5/10 |
| PC Gamer (US) | 64% | N/A | N/A | N/A | N/A |
| PlayStation: The Official Magazine | N/A | 8/10 | N/A | N/A | N/A |
| Detroit Free Press | N/A | N/A | N/A | N/A | 2/4 |
| The Sydney Morning Herald | 2.5/5 | N/A | N/A | 2.5/5 | 2.5/5 |

Blazing Angels: Squadrons of WWII received "mixed or average reviews" on all platforms according to the review aggregation website Metacritic. It was criticized for its repetitive gameplay, sluggish controls and bland graphics, though it was appreciated for its 'epic' and 'realistic' feel, most of which were dealt with in the sequel, Blazing Angels 2: Secret Missions of WWII.

In Japan, Famitsu gave it a score of two sevens, one six, and one seven for a total of 27 out of 40.

Detroit Free Press gave the Xbox 360 version a score of two stars out of four, stating that the history and simulation fans will find Blazing Angels "uplifting". The Sydney Morning Herald similarly gave the same console version two-and-a-half stars out of five along with the Xbox and PC versions. The A.V. Club gave the Xbox and Xbox 360 versions a C, criticizing the graphics, gameplay, and controls.

== See also ==
- Secret Weapons Over Normandy
