= Top Spin (video game) =

2003 tennis video game

- Cover art featuring Anna Kournikova, Lleyton Hewitt and Pete Sampras
- Developers: Salt Lake Games Studio; PAM Development
- Publisher: Microsoft Game Studios (Note: Windows version published by Atari Europe. PlayStation 2 version published by 2K.)
- Platforms: Xbox: Windows; PlayStation 2
- Release: October 28, 2003: Xbox; NA: October 28, 2003; EU: November 7, 2003 Microsoft Windows; EU: November 10, 2004 PlayStation 2; NA: September 26, 2005; EU: October 21, 2005
- Genre: Sports
- Modes: Single-player, multiplayer

Top Spin is a 2003 tennis video game developed by Salt Lake Games Studio and PAM Development and published by Microsoft Game Studios for the Xbox in October 2003. The game was later published by Atari Europe for Windows in 2004 and by 2K for the PlayStation 2 in 2005. It is a simulation tennis game in which players compete in singles and doubles tennis matches and exhibition tournaments. Gameplay modes include a career mode in which players develop skills and rise through the ranks of an international league. Top Spin featured an expanded control scheme compared to its contemporaries, and introduced several innovations including 'risk shots', in which players can execute more difficult serves and shots.

Top Spin was developed as a partnership between French company PAM Development and Microsoft Game Studio's Salt Lake subsidiary, with the aim of creating a more realistic and accessible simulation tennis game. The developers modelled the game on the design of previous console tennis titles including Virtua Tennis. Top Spin was developed to take advantage of the online capabilities of Xbox Live, with the game released as part of the XSN Sports brand and supported expanded online features.

Upon release, the Xbox version of Top Spin received universal acclaim by critics, with praise directed to the game's intuitive and accessible control scheme and graphical fidelity, with some critiques of the limitations of the game's career mode. The PlayStation 2 port of the game received mixed reviews, with attention directed to the reduced quality of the game's graphics. Following release, Top Spin received several sequels, with Top Spin 2 released in 2006.

== Gameplay ==
Top Spin recreates typical tennis play, allowing for various tennis shots to be executed.

Top Spin is a simulation tennis game that recreates single and double tennis matches and exhibition tournaments, in which players compete against a computer or other players in either local or online matches. Players can perform several tennis shots using different controls for flat, top spin, slice, and lob swings. Serves are executed using a 'power meter' that affects the speed of the shot. Players can also use the trigger buttons to perform a 'risk shot', which is more difficult to execute. If the player is able to land the shot in the center of the meter, their shot will be harder to return. The chances of success of a risk shot are increased by an 'In the Zone' meter, which increases as the player wins games throughout the course of a match.

Top Spin features several game modes. In 'Exhibition' mode, players can create customized matches by selecting one of sixteen playable professional players or a custom character, and set the match as a men's and women's singles or doubles match, the number of games per set, sets per match, and a range of venues categorized from small courts to Grand Slam facilities. In 'Career' mode, the player is able to create a custom character with a create-a-player interface to rise through the ranks of an international tennis league. In the career mode, the player is able to compete in tournaments, seek sponsorship from companies, and complete minigames in training sessions that improve the performance of the player in skills, including player precision and the ability to return serves, swings and risk shots. Players progress by winning 'coin' from tournaments and sponsorship challenges, allowing them to pay for training sessions and purchase new cosmetic upgrades. The game's tournaments, taking place across the globe, feature an increasing level of difficulty, from 'Minor Pro' to 'Grand Slam' tournaments, with the player increasing in a global ranking based on their performance in tournaments.

Top Spin features local system link play and online multiplayer play for up to four players. The Xbox version of the game featured enhanced online features under Xbox Live as part of the XSN Sports series. Online matches included 'Exhibition' matches that were identical to local matches that did not affect the player's online ranking, and allowed the player to specify the desired type of match, venue and difficulty of competitors. 'Official' matches, supported by XSN Sports, allowed players to participate in matches with their custom character against a global ranking for official tournaments. Players were able to use the XSN Sports website to monitor leaderboards and game schedules, and record and share detailed performance statistics, including the player's ranking, rating, skills and career data.

== Development ==
Top Spin was developed by a partnership between French developer PAM Development and Indie Games, the Salt Lake City division of Microsoft Game Studios. Indie Games had previous experience with developing sports Xbox titles, including Amped: Freestyle Snowboarding and the Links series of golf titles. Program manager Matthew Seymour stated that Top Spin was conceived as an Xbox competitor to the Virtua Tennis and Mario Tennis series, with the desire to create an "immersive tennis game" that "would also have in-depth and realistic tactical elements" absent in contemporary tennis titles. The developers experimented with several control schemes in creating the game's control scheme, settling on a "balance between ease of play and depth" by creating a series of 'safe' and 'risk' shots to introduce a tactical element "to make it true to (the) sport".

Top Spin was released by Microsoft Game Studios under the branding of XSN Sports, a series launched in 2003 following the launch of Xbox Live in the previous year with enhanced online capabilities for sports games, including for players to set up leagues, build tournaments and review data on the website. The game was supported by a roster of sixteen professional players, including Tommy Robredo, Jan-Michael Gambill and Michael Chang, with the cover of the Xbox version featuring Lleyton Hewitt, and the PlayStation 2 version featuring Roger Federer and Maria Sharapova. Motion capture technology was used to create a realistic likeness of the players and animate their movements.

The PS2 version includes Maria Sharapova, Venus Williams, Roger Federer and removes Pete Sampras, Michael Chang, and Anna Kournikova.

== Reception ==
Reception

Aggregate score
Aggregator	Score	
Aggregator	PS2	Xbox
Metacritic	67/100	89/100

Review scores
Publication	Score	
Publication	PS2	Xbox
Electronic Gaming Monthly	N/A	9/10
Eurogamer	N/A	8/10
Game Informer	8.75/10	9/10
GamePro	N/A	4.5/5
GameRevolution	N/A	B+
GameSpot	7.2/10	9.1/10
GameSpy	3/5	4.5/5
GameZone	8.5/10	9/10
IGN	7.4/10	9.3/10
Official U.S. PlayStation Magazine	3/5	N/A

According to review aggregator website Metacritic, the Xbox version of Top Spin received "generally favorable reviews" and the PlayStation 2 version received "mixed or average reviews". Several critics praised the Xbox version of the game as the best tennis simulation of its generation and a superior successor to Virtua Tennis, with GameSpot describing the game as "the most well-rounded, feature-rich game of tennis to be found anywhere, on any system," and GameSpy assessing the game as the "best arcade tennis game to date".

Reviewers generally praised the game's accessible control scheme and learning curve. Electronic Gaming Monthly praised the game's "easy access", writing that "the game's intuitive controls mean anyone can pick up the controller and play competitively." GameZone found the controls of the game to be accessible and player-friendly, whilst "evolving" in difficulty and presenting a challenge for players of all skill levels. GamePro similarly described the gameplay as "responding intuitively and naturally right from the start", whilst noting the game "has its own quirks", such as power-up shorts and serves being "more challenging than they should be." GameSpy praised the "smooth and accessible" gameplay and "wide variety of shots", but critiqued the game's risk shots as "not implemented well and too difficult to pull off in comparison to normal strokes".

Critics praised the game's visual presentation and animations. Describing the visuals as "eye-catching" and "one of the game's best features", GamePro praised the game's "slick" camera. Game Revolution highlighted the game's graphics, writing that the players "look great and move smoothly and accurately" and commending the realism of the courts and crowd animations. GameSpot wrote that "the look of the game is unmatched", particularly its "realistically rendered" courts, "clean and realistic" lighting and "fluid" player animations. GameSpy similarly praised the game's "sharp-looking courts" and "gorgeous character models". Game Informer expressed that the game's graphics easily surpassed its predecessors in the genre.

Reviewers also praised the inclusion and implementation of online play. GameSpot wrote that the inclusion of Xbox Live support put the game "head and shoulders above the competition", praising the "good number of play options" and XSN Sports features. IGN similarly highlighted the online features for their "leaderboards" and "number of opponents available for play", although wished "some original modes like point challenges" to "make the online component even more fun". Hyper praised the game as an "integral part" of the XSN Sports lineup, stating "it's pretty obvious that multiplayer is what this game as built for."

Critics expressed mixed views on the design of the career mode. Assessing that the "career mode could use a bit of beefing up", IGN described the mode as "competent and enjoyable", but lacked the "great mini-games" of Virtua Tennis. Eurogamer noted the career mode "could have been a lot better", citing the limited tournament pool of sixteen players and "lack of real competitions". GamePro commented that the pacing of the career mode was "a bit off as it's easy to train up your player too quickly." Despite finding the career mode to offer a "good amount of entertainment", Game Revolution critiqued the game's skills system and training sessions as not "very thrilling", and the cash system to be "sort of useless" in its use to purchase cosmetic upgrades. Game Informer considered the career mode to have a "distinct lack of star power" due to its the absence of major tennis stars and real-world venues.

The PlayStation 2 port of Top Spin received less favorable reviews due to the reduced graphics. IGN noted that whilst the PlayStation title was "wholly the same" as the Xbox release, "its presence on the PlayStation 2 is marred a bit by the PS2's lesser hardware". GameSpy similarly wrote that the "excellent animation, lively arenas, (and) lighting" on the original release were "not to be found" on the PlayStation 2 version, with the character models being "just not good", the audience animations being "especially horrid", and the "graphics (hurting) the actual play". Describing the game as a "half-hearted translation", GameSpot dismissed the "bland visuals" of the port and "dumbed down" character models, also faulting the game's "slow" transitions between menus and loading times.

=== Accolades ===
The Academy of Interactive Arts & Sciences at the 7th Annual Interactive Achievement Awards nominated Top Spin for "Console Sports Simulation Game of the Year", which was ultimately awarded to Madden NFL 2004.
