= NBA Inside Drive 2004 =

2004 video game

- Developer: High Voltage Software
- Publisher: Microsoft Game Studios
- Platform: Xbox
- Release: NA: 18 November 2003; JP: 22 January 2004
- Genre: Sports
- Modes: Single-player, Multiplayer

NBA Inside Drive 2004 is a 2003 sports video game developed by High Voltage Software and published by Microsoft Game Studios for the Xbox. Released under the Microsoft XSN Sports series, the game offered additional online functionality, including tournaments and leaderboards. Upon release, NBA Inside Drive 2004 received average reviews.

== Gameplay ==
Gameplay

Players can play matches of basketball in several modes, including single exhibition games, or franchise games played as seasons or playoffs. In the game's franchise mode, players select a team and complete up to 25 seasons of matches, managing the roster of their team's players, salaries and performance in between matches. A Manager mode allows players to create and edit players, teams and rosters. The game features three difficulty ratings: rookie, veteran, and all-star. The game supports Xbox Live multiplayer play, with players able to create online tournaments and view leaderboards on the XSN Sports website.

== Development and release ==
NBA Inside Drive 2004 was unveiled by Microsoft in May 2003 at E3 as part of its 2004 XSN Sports lineup, alongside Links 2004, NHL Rivals 2004 and NFL Fever 2004. The announcement featured a game demo showcasing a match between the Los Angeles Lakers and Sacramento Kings. The game was later showcased at the Leipzig Games Convention. The game's cover features NBA champion basketballer Shaquille O'Neal. Sports commentators Kevin Calabro, Marques Johnson and Kenny Smith also provided play-by-play commentary for the game. The game's gold master was finalised in November, and NBA Inside Drive 2004 was released on 18 November 2003. The game was the last in the Inside Drive series, following Microsoft's postponement and eventual cancellation of first-party sports titles in 2004.

== Critical reception ==
Reception

Aggregate score
Aggregator	Score
Metacritic	71%

Review scores
Publication	Score
Electronic Gaming Monthly	6.8/10
GameRevolution	C+
GameSpot	6.8/10
GameSpy	3/5
GameZone	7.8/10
IGN	8.4/10
Xbox Nation	5/10

NBA Inside Drive 2004 received "mixed or average" reviews, according to review aggregator Metacritic. Pre-release reception was tepid, with IGN considering the game was only a "slight upgrade" visually, although several critics expressed that the XSN Sports features were a major improvement for the game.
