= NFL Fever 2004 =

2003 video game

- Xbox cover featuring Peyton Manning (North America)
- Developer: Microsoft Game Studios
- Publisher: Microsoft Game Studios
- Series: NFL Fever
- Platform: Xbox
- Release: NA: August 28, 2003; EU: September 19, 2003
- Genre: Sports
- Modes: Single-player, multiplayer

NFL Fever 2004 is an American football video game published and developed by Microsoft Game Studios. It was released in North America on August 28, 2003 and in Europe on September 19, 2003 for the Xbox video game console and was included as a part of XSN Sports lineup. The game was preceded by NFL Fever 2003 and is the last entry in the series.

== Reception ==
Reception

Aggregate score
Aggregator	Score
Metacritic	74/100

Review scores
Publication	Score
Electronic Gaming Monthly	6.33/10 (Note: Two critics of Electronic Gaming Monthly gave the game each a score of 6.5/10, and the other gave it 6/10.)
Famitsu	27/40
Game Informer	7.5/10
GameSpot	7.3/10
GameSpy	3/5
GameZone	9.3/10
IGN	7.5/10
Jeuxvideo.com	16/20
Official Xbox Magazine (US)	7.9/10
TeamXbox	9.1/10
X-Play	3/5
The Cincinnati Enquirer	3.5/5

NFL Fever 2004 received "average" reviews according to the review aggregation website Metacritic. In Japan, where the game was ported for release on October 23, 2003, Famitsu gave it a score of two sevens, one five, and one eight for a total of 27 out of 40. Atomic Dawg of GamePro called it "a game you can grow to love. In fact, Fever 2004 gives every indication that the 2005 edition is going to be some kind of Xbox monster... but that's a season away." (Note: GamePro gave the game two 4.5/5 scores for graphics and sound, 3.5/5 for control, and 4/5 for fun factor.)
