= Links 2004 =

2003 video game

- Developer: Salt Lake Games Studio
- Publisher: Microsoft Game Studios
- Platform: Xbox
- Release: NA: November 11, 2003; EU: November 28, 2003
- Genre: Sports
- Modes: Single player, multiplayer

Links 2004 is a golf simulation computer game by Microsoft for the Xbox. It is the final game in the Links series and follows Links 2003, as well as being the only game being released on a non-computer platform. It was also part of Microsoft's XSN Sports lineup.

== Gameplay ==
The game supports from one to four players, system link of 2-4 players, Dolby 5.1 Surround sound, custom soundtracks, HDTV 480p, and Xbox Live Scoreboard and online play. It also featured simultaneous online play - referred to as Stroke "Fast Play" - where each player could complete the hole at their own pace and not have to wait their turns.

== Release ==
Links 2004 was released in the United States on November 11, 2003. A downloadable course of Hawaii's Kapalua Plantation was made available through Xbox Live in early 2004.

== Reception ==
Reception

Aggregate score
| Aggregator | Score |
|---|---|
| Metacritic | 80/100 |

Review scores
| Publication | Score |
|---|---|
| Electronic Gaming Monthly | 6.83/10 |
| Eurogamer | 7/10 |
| Famitsu | 28/40 |
| Game Informer | 7/10 |
| GameRevolution | B− |
| GameSpot | 7.7/10 |
| GameSpy | 3/5 |
| GameZone | 8.4/10 |
| IGN | 7.5/10 |
| Official Xbox Magazine (US) | 9.1/10 |

Links 2004 received "generally favorable reviews" according to the review aggregation website Metacritic. In Japan, where the game was ported for release on March 25, 2004, Famitsu gave it a score of one eight, one six, and two sevens for a total of 28 out of 40.
