= List of Xbox network games =

This is a list of network games on the Xbox video game console. It includes Online Multiplayer titles as well as System link enabled games, which can be played by connecting multiple Xbox systems together locally.

After Microsoft's termination of the original Xbox Live service on April 15, 2010, the majority of the game titles remain virtually playable, but their online connectivity and functionality were rendered defunct, even after some of them were re-released digitally. However, Insignia, a replacement online service for the original Xbox, allows players to continue to play Xbox Live titles online, bringing back online functionality and features to currently supported games.

Many of the game titles that were released later had updates, which added features that were not initially supported on retail copies of the games.

Some games (notably all games published by EA) ran on custom separate servers with Xbox Live feature integration.

== Network features ==
=== Basic features ===
Online Multiplayer: Create, join, and spectate matches with other players.

Content Download: Additional updates, maps, missions, modes, or characters, user generated and other content available to download via Xbox Live.

Scoreboards: Measure your performance against other players with global leaderboards.

Friends: View online status, invite to games, and manage your list of Xbox Live friends.

Voice: Communicate with other players using in-game voice chat.

System Link: Connect multiple Xbox consoles together to play over a local network connection.

=== Additional features ===
Clans: Create organised player groups in-game, with a clan tag for easy identification.

Competitions: Join and create tournaments directly through the in-game Xbox Live menu.

Xbox Live Aware: Receive invitations and view Xbox Live friends, even when playing single player modes.

XSN: Xbox Sports Network, a service for Microsoft-developed sports titles that allows for web-based player tournaments and statistics.

== Released games ==
This list contains 381 games

Game title	Genre	Publisher	Date Released	Features Supported	Content Download
187 Ride or Die	Racing	Ubisoft	WW: August 24, 2005; EU: August 26, 2005	Online Multiplayer, System Link, Voice, Friends	
2006 FIFA World Cup	Sports	EA Sports	NA: 24 April 2006; EU: 28 April 2006	Online Multiplayer, Scoreboards, Friends, Voice	
25 To Life	Third-person shooter	Eidos Interactive	NA: January 17, 2006	Content Download, Online Multiplayer, Scoreboards, System Link, Voice, Friends	
Advent Rising	Action-adventure	Majesco	NA: May 31, 2005; EU: February 17, 2006	Content Download (NA Only), Xbox Live Aware	Emblems
AFL Premiership	Sports	THQ	AU: September 22, 2005	Online Multiplayer, Scoreboards, Voice, System Link	
Alien Hominid	Run and gun	Zoo Digital Publishing	EU: May 27, 2005	Content Download, Friends, Scoreboards	Levels
All-Star Baseball 2004	Sports	Acclaim Entertainment	NA: February 28, 2003	Content Download	Rosters
All-Star Baseball 2005	Sports	Acclaim Entertainment	NA: March 23, 2004	Online Multiplayer, Scoreboards, Content Download, Voice, Friends	Rosters
America's Army: Rise of a Soldier	First-person shooter	Ubisoft	NA: November 17, 2005; PAL: February 24, 2006	Online Multiplayer, Scoreboards, Voice, System Link	
Amped 2	Sports	Microsoft Game Studios	NA: October 28, 2003; EU: November 14, 2003	Online Multiplayer, Scoreboards, Content Download, System Link, Voice, XSN, Friends	Runs
AND 1 Streetball	Sports	Ubisoft	NA: June 6, 2006; AU: August 31, 2006; EU: September 1, 2006	Online Multiplayer, Scoreboards, Content Download, Voice, System Link	
Area 51	First-person shooter	Midway Games	NA: April 25, 2005; AU: May 26, 2005; EU: May 27, 2005	Online Multiplayer, Scoreboards, Friends, Voice	
Arena Football	Sports	Electronic Arts	NA: February 7, 2006	Online Multiplayer, Scoreboards, Content Download, Friends, Voice	Rosters
Armed & Dangerous	Shooter	LucasArts	NA: December 2, 2003; EU: February 27, 2004	Content Download, Online Multiplayer	Missions
Army Men: Sarge's War	Shooter	Global Star Software	NA: August 2, 2004 EU: July 23, 2004	Xbox Live Aware	
Atari Anthology	Arcade	Atari	NA: November 16, 2004 EU: November 26, 2004	Scoreboards, Friends	
Auto Modellista	Racing	Capcom	NA: January 20, 2004; JP: January 29, 2004	Online Multiplayer, Scoreboards, Voice, Friends	
Battlefield 2: Modern Combat	First-person shooter	Electronic Arts	NA: October 24, 2005; EU: November 18, 2005	Online Multiplayer, Scoreboards, Friends, Voice, Content Download, Clans	Maps, Vehicles, Skins
Bicycle Casino	Gambling	Activision	NA: October 26, 2004; EU: March 24, 2005	Online Multiplayer, Scoreboards, Voice, Friends	
Big Bumpin'	Arcade	King Games	NA: November 19, 2006	Online Multiplayer, Scoreboards, Voice	
Blazing Angels: Squadrons of WWII	Flight combat	Ubisoft	NA: March 23, 2006; NA: March 28, 2006 (PC); AU: March 30, 2006 (Xbox, X360); EU: March 31, 2006	Online Multiplayer, Scoreboards, System Link, Voice, Friends	
Blitz: The League	Sports	Midway Games	NA: October 17, 2005	Online Multiplayer, Scoreboards, Voice, Friends	
Brothers in Arms: Earned in Blood	First-person shooter	Ubisoft	NA: October 6, 2005; EU: October 7, 2005	Online Multiplayer, Scoreboards, Content Download, System Link, Voice, Friends	Maps
Brothers in Arms: Road to Hill 30	First-person shooter	Ubisoft	NA: March 1, 2005; EU: March 18, 2005	Online Multiplayer, Scoreboards, System Link, Voice, Friends	Updates
Brute Force	Third-person shooter	Microsoft Game Studios	NA: May 28, 2003; PAL: June 20, 2003	Content Download, System Link	Missions, Maps
Burnout 2: Point of Impact: Publisher's Cut	Racing	Acclaim Entertainment	NA: 1 May 2003; EU: 9 May 2003	Scoreboards	
Burnout 3: Takedown	Racing	Electronic Arts	NA: 8 September 2004; EU: 10 September 2004	Online Multiplayer, Scoreboards, Friends, Voice, Content Download	Updates
Burnout Revenge	Racing	Electronic Arts	NA: 13 September 2005; EU: 23 September 2005; AU: 26 September 2005	Online Multiplayer, Scoreboards, Friends, Voice,	
Cabela's Big Game Hunter 2005 Adventures	Sports	Activision	NA: November 23, 2004 PAL: October 14, 2005	Scoreboards	
Cabela's Dangerous Hunts	Sports	Activision	NA: 11 November 2003	Scoreboards	
Cabela's Deer Hunt: 2004 Season	Sports	Activision	NA: 26 August 2003	Scoreboards	
Cabela's Deer Hunt: 2005 Season	Sports	Activision	NA: 31 August 2004	Scoreboards	
Call of Duty: Finest Hour	First-person shooter	Activision	NA: November 16, 2004; EU: December 3, 2004	Online Multiplayer, System Link, Voice, Friends	
Call of Duty 2: Big Red One	First-person shooter	Activision	NA: November 1, 2005; EU: November 18, 2005	Online Multiplayer, System Link, Voice, Friends	
Call of Duty 3	First-person shooter	Activision	NA: November 7, 2006; EU: November 10, 2006; AU: November 22, 2006	Online Multiplayer, System Link, Voice, Friends	
Capcom Fighting Evolution	Fighting	Capcom	NA: June 14, 2005; JP: June 16, 2005; EU: June 24, 2005	Online Multiplayer, Scoreboards, Voice, Friend	
Capcom vs. SNK 2 EO	Fighting	Capcom	JP: January 16, 2003; NA: February 11, 2003; PAL: March 7, 2003	Online Multiplayer (NA Only), Content Download, Voice, Friends	Updates
Castle Shikigami 2	Scrolling shooter	Kids Station	JP: April 15, 2004	Content Download, Scoreboards	
Carve	Racing	Global Star Software	NA: February 24, 2004; EU: March 19, 2004	Online Multiplayer, Scoreboards, System Link, Voice, Friends	
Championship Manager 2006	Sports	Eidos Interactive	EU: May 12, 2006	Scoreboards, Content Download, Friends	
Chessmaster	Board Game	Ubisoft	NA: October 28, 2004	Online Multiplayer, Scoreboards, Voice, Friends	
Chicago Enforcer	First-person shooter	Kemco	NA: February 23, 2005	Online Multiplayer, System Link, Voice, Friends	
The Chronicles of Riddick: Escape from Butcher Bay	Action	Vivendi Universal Games	NA: June 1, 2004 EU: August 13, 2004	Xbox Live Aware	
Close Combat: First to Fight	First-person shooter	2K Games	NA: April 6, 2005; EU: April 29, 2005	Online Multiplayer, Scoreboards, Content Download, System Link, Voice, Friends	
Cold War	Tactical Shooter	Dreamcatcher Games	NA: 28 September 2005 EU: 21 October 2005	Xbox Live Aware	
Colin McRae Rally 04	Racing	Codemasters	EU: 19 September 2003; NA: 4 March 2004	Scoreboards	
Colin McRae Rally 2005	Racing	Codemasters	EU: 24 September 2004; NA: 28 September 2004	Online Multiplayer, Scoreboards, Content Download, System Link, Voice, Friends	
College Hoops 2K6	Sports	2K Sports	NA: November 21, 2005	Online Multiplayer, Scoreboards, Voice, Friends	
College Hoops 2K7	Sports	2K Sports	NA: November 20, 2006	Online Multiplayer, Scoreboards, Voice, Friends	
Combat: Task Force 121	First-person shooter	Groove Games	NA: March 27, 2005; EU: March 10, 2006	Online Multiplayer, System Link, Friends, Voice	
Commandos: Strike Force	First-person shooter	Eidos Interactive	EU: 17 March 2006; NA: 4 April 2006	Online Multiplayer, System Link, Voice, Friends	
Conan	Action-adventure	TDK Mediactive Europe	EU: 7 April 2004	Online Multiplayer, Voice, Friends, System Link	
Conflict: Desert Storm II: Back to Baghdad	Tactical Shooter	Gotham Games	EU: 19 September 2003; NA: 7 October 2003	Content Download	Skins
Conflict: Global Terror	Tactical Shooter	2K Games	EU: September 30, 2005; NA: October 4, 2005	Online Multiplayer, Scoreboards, System Link, Voice, Friends	
Conker: Live and Reloaded	Platform	Microsoft Game Studios	NA: 21 June 2005; EU: 24 June 2005; JP: 30 June 2005	Online Multiplayer, Scoreboards, System Link, Voice, Friends	
Corvette	Racing	TDK Mediactive	NA: December 10, 2003	Online Multiplayer, Scoreboards, System Link, Voice, Friends	
CT Special Forces: Fire for Effect	Third-person shooter	Hip Games	NA: 22 March 2005 EU: 1 April 2005	Xbox Live aware	
Counter-Strike	First-person shooter	Sierra Studios	NA: November 18, 2003; EU: December 5, 2003	Online Multiplayer, Scoreboards, Friends, Voice, Content Download, System Link	Updates, Maps, Game Modes
Crash 'n' Burn	Racing	Eidos Interactive	NA: November 16, 2004; EU: December 10, 2004	Online Multiplayer, Scoreboards, Voice, Friends	
Crash Tag Team Racing	Racing	Sierra	NA: October 21, 2005; AU: November 3, 2005; EU: November 4, 2005	System Link	
Crime Life: Gang Wars	Action	Konami	NA: November 22, 2005 EU: November 11, 2005	Xbox Live aware	
Crimson Skies: High Road to Revenge	Action	Microsoft Game Studios	NA: October 21, 2003; EU: October 31, 2003	Online Multiplayer, Scoreboards, Content Download, System Link, Voice, Friends	Updates, Game Modes, Maps
Daemon Vector	Role Playing	XPEC Entertainment	TW: June 21, 2004	Scoreboards, Content Download	
Dance Dance Revolution Ultramix	Rhythm	Konami	NA: November 20, 2003	Online Multiplayer, Scoreboards, Content Download, Voice, Friends, System Link	Updates, Songs
Dance Dance Revolution Ultramix 2	Rhythm	Konami	NA: November 18, 2004	Online Multiplayer, Scoreboards, Content Download, Voice, Friends	Updates, Songs, Dancers
Dance Dance Revolution Ultramix 3	Rhythm	Konami	NA: November 15, 2005	Online Multiplayer, Scoreboards, Content Download, Voice, Friends	Updates, Songs
Dance Dance Revolution Ultramix 4	Rhythm	Konami	NA: November 14, 2006	Online Multiplayer, Scoreboards, Content Download, Voice, Friends	Updates, Songs
Dancing Stage Unleashed	Rhythm	Konami	EU: April 30, 2004	Online Multiplayer, Scoreboards, Content Download, Voice, Friends	Updates, Songs
Dancing Stage Unleashed 2	Rhythm	Konami		Online Multiplayer, Scoreboards, Content Download, Voice, Friends	
Dancing Stage Unleashed 3	Rhythm	Konami		Online Multiplayer, Scoreboards, Content Download, Voice, Friends	
Dance UK	Rhythm	BigBen		Scoreboards, Friends	
Darkwatch	First-person shooter	Capcom	NA: August 16, 2005; EU: October 7, 2005	Online Multiplayer, Content Download, Voice, Friends	Updates
Dead Man's Hand	First-person shooter	Atari	NA: March 2, 2004; EU: April 29, 2004	Online Multiplayer, Content Download, System Link, Voice, Friends	
Dead or Alive Ultimate	Fighting	Koei Tecmo	NA: October 26, 2004; JP: November 3, 2004; EU: February 18, 2005	Online Multiplayer, Scoreboards, Content Download, Voice, Friends	Updates
Deathrow	Sports	Ubisoft	EU: 18 October 2002; NA: 22 October 2002	System Link	
Delta Force: Black Hawk Down	First-person shooter	NovaLogic	NA: July 26, 2005; EU: September 2, 2005	Online Multiplayer, Clans, Scoreboards, Content Download, System Link, Voice, Friends	
Dennou Taisen: DroneZ	First-person shooter	Metro 3D	JP: August 4, 2005	Online Multiplayer, Scoreboards, Content Download, Voice	
Doom 3	First-person shooter	Activision	NA: April 3, 2005; EU: April 8, 2005	Online Multiplayer, Scoreboards, Content Download, System Link, Voice, Friends	Maps
Doom 3: Resurrection of Evil	First-person shooter	Activision	NA: October 5, 2005; EU: October 21, 2005	Online Multiplayer, Scoreboards, Content Download, System Link, Voice, Friends	Maps
Double-S.T.E.A.L The Second Clash	Racing	Microsoft Game Studios	JP: August 4, 2005	Scoreboards	
DRIV3R	Racing	Atari	NA: 21 June 2004; EU: 25 June 2004	Xbox Live Aware, Scoreboards, Content Download, Friends, Game Clips	Updates
England International Football	Sports	Codemasters	EU: 30 April 2004	Online Multiplayer, Content Download, Voice, Friends	Updates
ESPN College Hoops	Sports	Sega	NA: 13 November 2003	Online Multiplayer, Scoreboards, Content Download, Voice, Friends	Rosters
ESPN College Hoops 2K5	Sports	Sega	NA: 17 November 2004	Online Multiplayer, Scoreboards, Content Download, Voice, Friends	Rosters
ESPN Major League Baseball	Sports	Sega	NA: 6 April 2004	Online Multiplayer, Scoreboards, Content Download, Voice, Friends	Rosters
ESPN NBA 2K5	Sports	Sega	NA: September 28, 2004; EU: February 4, 2005	NA only: Online Multiplayer, Scoreboards, Content Download, Voice, Friends	Rosters
ESPN NBA Basketball	Sports	Sega	NA: October 21, 2003; EU: November 28, 2003	Online Multiplayer, Scoreboards, Content Download, Voice	Rosters
ESPN NFL Football	Sports	Sega	NA: September 3, 2003; EU: November 28, 2003	Online Multiplayer, Scoreboards, Content Download, Voice	Rosters
ESPN NFL 2K5	Sports	Sega	NA: July 20, 2004; EU: February 4, 2005	NA only: Online Multiplayer, Scoreboards, Content Download, Voice	Rosters
ESPN NHL 2K5	Sports	Sega	NA: 30 August 2004; EU: 4 February 2005	NA only : Online Multiplayer, Scoreboards, Content Download, Voice	Rosters
ESPN NHL Hockey	Sports	Sega	NA: September 9, 2003; EU: November 28, 2003	Online Multiplayer, Scoreboards, Content Download, System Link, Voice	Rosters
Fable	Role Playing	Microsoft Game Studios	NA: 14 September 2004; EU: 8 October 2004; JP: 17 March 2005	Xbox Live Aware	
Fable: The Lost Chapters	Role Playing	Microsoft Game Studios	NA: 18 October 2005; EU: 21 October 2005	Xbox Live Aware	
Far Cry: Instincts	First-person shooter	Ubisoft	NA: September 27, 2005; EU: September 30, 2005	Online Multiplayer, Content Download, Friends, Scoreboards, System Link, Voice	Updates, Maps
Far Cry Instincts: Evolution	First-person shooter	Ubisoft	NA: March 28, 2006	Online Multiplayer, Scoreboards, Content Download, Friends, System Link, Voice	Updates, Maps
FIFA Soccer 2005	Sports	EA Sports	PAL: 8 October 2004; NA: 12 October 2004	Online Multiplayer, Scoreboards, Voice, Friends	
FIFA 06	Sports	EA Sports	PAL: 30 September 2005; NA: 4 October 2005	Online Multiplayer, Scoreboards, Voice, Friends	
FIFA 07	Sports	EA Sports	AU: 6 October 2006; EU: 13 October 2006; NA: 25 September 2006	Online Multiplayer, Scoreboards, Voice, Friends	
Fight Club	Fighting	Vivendi Universal Games	NA: November 16, 2004; EU: December 10, 2004	Online Multiplayer, Scoreboards, Content Download, System Link, Voice, Friends	Music
Fight Night Round 2	Sports	EA Sports	NA: February 28, 2005; PAL: March 18, 2005; JP: September 1, 2005	NA only: Online Multiplayer, Friends, Voice	
Fight Night Round 3	Sports	EA Sports	NA: February 20, 2006; EU: March 10, 2006	Online Multiplayer, Scoreboards, Friends, Voice	
Fila World Tour Tennis	Sports	THQ		System Link	
Flatout	Racing	Empire Interactive	EU: November 5, 2004; NA: July 12, 2005; JP: October 13, 2005	Online Multiplayer, Scoreboards, Content Download, System Link, Voice, Friends	Updates
FlatOut 2	Racing	Empire Interactive	EU: June 30, 2006; NA: August 1, 2006	Online Multiplayer, Scoreboards, Content Download, System Link, Voice	Updates
Ford Racing 2	Racing	Gotham Games	NA: November 3, 2003	Scoreboards, Contend Download, Online Multiplayer	
Ford Racing 3	Racing	2K Games	NA: October 29, 2004	Online Multiplayer, Scoreboards, Voice, Friends	
Ford vs Chevy	Racing	Global Star Software	NA: November 9, 2005	Online Multiplayer, System Link, Voice, Friends	
Forza Motorsport	Racing	Microsoft Game Studios	NA: May 3, 2005; EU: May 13, 2005	Online Multiplayer, Scoreboards, Clans, System Link, Voice, Friends	Updates
Frankie Dettori Racing	Sports	Tru Blu Entertainment	AU: 26 October 2006; EU: 8 December 2006	Online Multiplayer, Friends, Voice	
Full Spectrum Warrior	Real-time tactics	THQ	NA: June 1, 2004; EU: June 25, 2004	Online Multiplayer, Content Download, Voice, Friends	Missions
Full Spectrum Warrior: Ten Hammers	Real-time tactics	THQ	NA: March 28, 2006; EU: June 23, 2006	Online Multiplayer, Scoreboards, Content Download, System Link, Voice, Friends	Missions
Future Tactics: The Uprising	Tactical shooter	Crave Entertainment	NA: May 5, 2004	Xbox Live Aware, System Link	
Gauntlet: Seven Sorrows	Hack and slash	Midway Games	NA: December 12, 2005; EU: March 24, 2006; AU: March 30, 2006	Online Multiplayer, Voice, Friends	
Godzilla: Destroy All Monsters Melee	Fighting	Infogrames	NA: April 16, 2003; PAL: 2003	Content Download	Maps
Godzilla: Save the Earth	Fighting	Atari	NA: November 16, 2004; PAL: November 19, 2004	NA Only: Online Multiplayer, System Link, Voice, Friends	
GoldenEye: Rogue Agent	First-person shooter	Electronic Arts	NA: November 22, 2004	Online Multiplayer, Scoreboards, System Link, Voice, Friends	
Gotcha!	First-person shooter	Gathering	EU: April 15, 2005	Online Multiplayer, System Link, Voice, Friends	
Greg Hastings Tournament Paintball	First-person shooter	Activision	NA: November 16, 2004; EU: March 24, 2005	Online Multiplayer, Scoreboards, System Link, Voice, Friends	
Greg Hastings Tournament Paintball MAX'D	First-person shooter	Publisher	NA: October 18, 2005	Online Multiplayer, Scoreboards, Clans, System Link, Voice, Friends	
Guilty Gear Isuka	Fighting	Sammy Studios	JP: December 17, 2003	Online Multiplayer, Scoreboards, Voice, Friends	
Guilty Gear X2 #Reload	Fighting	Arc System Works	JP: April 29, 2004; NA: September 14, 2004; EU: November 26, 2004	Online Multiplayer, Scoreboards, Content Download, Voice, Friends	Updates
GUN	Action-adventure	Activision	NA: November 8, 2005; EU: November 11, 2005	Xbox Live Aware	
GunGriffon: Allied Strike	Shooter	Tecmo	JP: December 16, 2004; NA: December 14, 2004; EU: April 8, 2005	Online Multiplayer, Scoreboards, System Link, Voice, Friends	
Halo: Combat Evolved	First-person shooter	Microsoft Game Studios	NA: November 15, 2001; EU: March 14, 2002	System Link	
Halo 2	First-person shooter	Microsoft Game Studios	NA: November 9, 2004; EU: November 11, 2004	Online Multiplayer, Scoreboards, Friends, Voice, Clans, Content Download, System Link	Updates, Maps, Game Modes
Heroes of the Pacific	Air combat	Ubisoft	EU: September 23, 2005; NA: September 28, 2005	Online Multiplayer, System Link, Voice, Friends	
High Heat Major League Baseball 2004	Sports	The 3DO Company	NA: March 6, 2003	Content Download	Rosters
Hitman: Blood Money	Stealth	Eidos Interactive	NA: May 30, 2006; EU: May 26, 2006; AU: June 1, 2006	Scoreboards, Friends	
Hot Wheels Stunt Track Challenge	Racing	THQ	NA: November 9, 2004; PAL: November 26, 2004	System Link	
Hunter: The Reckoning: Redeemer	Hack-and-slash	Vivendi Universal Games	NA: October 28, 2003; EU: November 21, 2003	Content Download	Costumes
The Hustle: Detroit Streets	Simulation	Activision	NA: October 25, 2005	Online Multiplayer, Friends, Voice	
IHRA Drag Racing 2004	Racing	Bethesda Softworks	NA: September 25, 2003	Content Download	Updates
IndyCar Series 2005	Racing	Codemasters	NA: June 22, 2004; EU: June 25, 2004	Online Multiplayer, Scoreboards, System Link, Voice, Friends	
Iron Phoenix	Fighting	Sammy Corporation	NA: March 22, 2005	Online Multiplayer, Scoreboards, Friends, Voice, Clans, Content Download, System Link	Maps
Jade Empire	Role Playing	Publisher	NA: April 12, 2005; EU: April 22, 2005; JP: June 16, 2005; AU: June 30, 2005	Content Download	Character Classes
Jacked	Racing	Empire Interactive		Xbox Live Aware	
Juiced	Racing	THQ	NA: 13 June 2005; EU: 17 June 2005	Online Multiplayer, Scoreboards, System Link, Voice, Friends	
Karaoke Revolution	Karaoke	Konami	NA: 10 November 2004	Content Download, Friends	New Songs
Karaoke Revolution Party	Karaoke	Konami	NA: 8 November 2005	Content Download, Friends	New Songs
King of Fighters 02/03	Fighting	Playmore	NA: 31 August 2005	Online Multiplayer, Scoreboards, Voice, Friends	
King of Fighters 2002	Fighting	Playmore	JP: 24 March 2005; EU: November 2005	Online Multiplayer, Scoreboards, Voice, Friends, Live Aware	
King of Fighters 2003	Fighting	Playmore	JP: 25 August 2005	Online Multiplayer, Scoreboards, Voice, Friends	
King of Fighters: Maximum Impact - Maniax	Fighting	Playmore	JP: August 12, 2004; NA: October 7, 2004; EU: March 4, 2005	Online Multiplayer, Scoreboards, Voice, Friends	
The King of Fighters: Neowave	Fighting	Playmore	JP: March 30, 2006; NA: April 18, 2006	Online Multiplayer, Scoreboards, Friends, Voice	
Kingdom Under Fire: Heroes	Hack and slash	Microsoft Game Studios	NA: September 20, 2005; EU: October 7, 2005	Online Multiplayer, Scoreboards, Content Download, System Link, Voice, Friends	
Kingdom Under Fire: The Crusaders	Hack and slash	Microsoft Game Studios	NA: October 12, 2004; EU: October 29, 2004	Online Multiplayer, Scoreboards, Content Download, Voice, Friends	
Knights of the Temple: Infernal Crusade	Hack and slash	TDK Mediactive	EU: April 8, 2004	Content Download, Scoreboards	Updates, Maps
L.A. Rush	Racing	Midway Games	NA: 10 October 2005; EU: 21 October 2005	Scoreboards, Content Download, Friends	Skins
Land of the Dead: Road to Fiddler's Green	First-person shooter	Groove Games	NA: 20 October 2005	Online Multiplayer, System Link, Voice, Friends	
LMA Manager 2005	Sports	Codemasters	PAL: 31 October 2004	Content Download, Scoreboards, Friends	Rosters
LMA Manager 2006	Sports	Codemasters	PAL: 18 November 2005	Scoreboards, Content Download, Friends	
Links 2004	Sports	Microsoft Game Studios	NA: November 11, 2003; EU: November 28, 2003	Online Multiplayer, Scoreboards, Content Download, System Link, Voice, XSN, Friends	Courses
Madden NFL 06	Sports	EA Sports	NA: August 8, 2005; EU: September 16, 2005	NA Only: Online Multiplayer, Scoreboards, Content Download, System Link, Voice	Rosters
Madden NFL 07	Sports	EA Sports	NA: August 22, 2006; EU: August 25, 2006; AU: August 31, 2006	NA only: Online Multiplayer, Scoreboards, Content Download, Voice	Rosters
Madden NFL 08	Sports	EA Sports	NA: August 14, 2007; EU: August 24, 2007; AU: August 23, 2007	Online Multiplayer, Scoreboards, Content Download, Voice, Friends	Rosters
Madden NFL 09	Sports	EA Sports	NA: August 12, 2008; EU: August 15, 2008; AU: August 14, 2008	Online Multiplayer, Scoreboards, Content Download, Voice, Friends	Rosters
Madden NFL 2005	Sports	EA Sports	NA: August 9, 2004; EU: September 17, 2004	Online Multiplayer, Scoreboards, Content Download, Voice (Only NA Version)	Rosters
Magic: The Gathering - Battlegrounds	Fighting	Atari	NA: November 18, 2003	Online Multiplayer, Scoreboards, Content Download, Voice, Friends, System Link	Spells
Major League Baseball 2K5	Sports	2K Sports	NA: February 23, 2005	Online Multiplayer, Scoreboards, Content Download, Voice, Friends	Rosters
Major League Baseball 2K5: World Series Edition	Sports	2K Sports	NA: October 18, 2005	Online Multiplayer, Scoreboards, Voice, Friends	
Major League Baseball 2K6	Sports	2K Sports	NA: April 3, 2006	Online Multiplayer, Scoreboards, Content Download, Voice, Friends	Rosters
Major League Baseball 2K7	Sports	2K Sports	NA: February 27, 2007	Online Multiplayer, Scoreboards, Content Download, Voice, Friends	Rosters
Manchester United Manager 2005	Sports	Codemasters	PAL: October 22, 2004	Content Download, Friends, Scoreboards	Updates
Marvel Nemesis: Rise of the Imperfects	Fighting	Electronic Arts	NA: September 20, 2005; PAL: October 14, 2005	Online Multiplayer, Scoreboards, Voice, Friends	
Marvel Ultimate Alliance	Action	Activision	NA: October 24, 2006; EU: October 27, 2006; AU: November 1, 2006	Online Multiplayer, Voice, Friends, System Link	
MechAssault	Third-person Shooter	Microsoft Game Studios	NA: November 15, 2002; PAL: November 22, 2002	Online Multiplayer, Scoreboards, Content Download, System Link, Voice, Friends	Updates, Maps, Game Modes, Mechs
MechAssault 2: Lone Wolf	Third-person Shooter	Microsoft Game Studios	NA: December 28, 2004; JP: January 20, 2005; PAL: February 4, 2005	Online Multiplayer, Clans, Scoreboards, Content Download, System Link, Voice, Friends	Maps
Men of Valor	First-person shooter	Vivendi Universal Games	NA: October 19, 2004; PAL: November 5, 2004	Online Multiplayer, Scoreboards, System Link, Voice, Friends	
Metal Slug 3	Run and gun	SNK	NA: 25 May 2004; JP: 24 June 2004; EU: 5 November 2004	Scoreboards	
Metal Slug 4	Run and gun	SNK	JP: 24 February 2005; EU: 4 November 2005	Scoreboards, Friends	
Metal Slug 5	Run and gun	SNK	JP: 28 July 2005; EU: 10 March 2006	Scoreboards, Friends	
Metal Slug 4 & 5	Run and gun	SNK	NA: 19 August 2005	Scoreboards	
Metal Wolf Chaos	Third-person shooter	FromSoftware	JP: December 22, 2004	Scoreboards, Content Download, Friends	Music, Weapons, Mystery Objects
Microsoft Windows Media Center Extender for Xbox	Application	Microsoft	NA: 11 September 2004	Content Download	Updates
Midnight Club II	Racing	Rockstar Games	NA: June 4, 2003; EU: June 20, 2003	Online Multiplayer, Scoreboards, System Link, Voice, Friends	
Midnight Club 3: DUB Edition	Racing	Rockstar Games	NA: April 11, 2005; PAL: April 15, 2005	Online Multiplayer, Scoreboards, Content Download, Clans, System Link, Voice, Friends	Updates
Midnight Club 3: DUB Edition Remix	Racing	Rockstar Games	NA: March 13, 2006; EU: March 17, 2006	Online Multiplayer, Scoreboards, Content Download, Clans, System Link, Voice, Friends	Updates
Midtown Madness 3	Racing	Microsoft Game Studios	NA: 17 June 2003; EU: 27 June 2003; JP: 7 August 2003	Online Multiplayer, Content Download, Voice, System Link	Updates, Cars, Tracks
Midway Arcade Treasures	Various	Midway Games	NA: December 2, 2003; EU: February 6, 2004	Scoreboards	
Midway Arcade Treasures 2	Various	Midway Games	NA: October 11, 2004; EU: October 29, 2004	Scoreboards	
Midway Arcade Treasures 3	Various	Midway Games	NA: September 27, 2005; EU: October 14, 2005	Scoreboards, Friends	
MLB Inside Pitch 2003	Sports	Microsoft Game Studios	NA: 20 May 2003	Online Multiplayer, Scoreboards, Content Download, System Link, Voice, Friends	Rosters
MLB Slugfest: Loaded	Sports	Midway Games	NA: June 23, 2004	Online Multiplayer, Scoreboards, Friends, Competitions, Content Download, Voice	Rosters
Monster Garage	Racing	Activision	NA: November 3, 2004	Scoreboards, Friends	
Mortal Kombat: Armageddon	Fighting	Midway Games	NA: October 17, 2006	Online Multiplayer, Scoreboards, Voice, Friends	
Mortal Kombat: Deception	Fighting	Midway Games	NA: October 4, 2004; PAL: November 19, 2004	Online Multiplayer, Scoreboards, Voice, Friends	
Motocross Mania 3	Racing	2K Games	PAL: April 22, 2005; NA: April 27, 2005	Scoreboards, Friends	
MotoGP Online Demo	Racing	THQ	NA: May 19, 2002; EU: May 24, 2002	Online Multiplayer, Scoreboards, Content Download	Updates
MotoGP	Racing	THQ	NA: May 20, 2002; EU: May 24, 2002	System Link	
MotoGP 2	Racing	THQ	EU: May 15, 2003; NA: May 21, 2003	Online Multiplayer, Scoreboards, Content Download, System Link, Voice, Friends	Updates
MotoGP 3: URT	Racing	THQ	NA: 30 August 2005; EU: 2 September 2005	Online Multiplayer, Scoreboards, Content Download, System Link, Voice, Friends	Updates
MTX: Mototrax	Racing	Activision	NA: March 2, 2004; EU: March 26, 2004	Online Multiplayer, Scoreboards, System Link, Voice, Friends	
Muzzle Flash	Third-person Shooter	Victor	JP: February 27, 2003	Online Multiplayer, Friends, Voice	
MVP 06 NCAA Baseball	Sports	Electronic Arts	NA: January 18, 2006	Online Multiplayer, Voice	
MVP Baseball 2005	Sports	Electronic Arts	NA: February 22, 2005; AU: March 23, 2005; EU: April 11, 2005; JP: July 7, 2005	Online Multiplayer, Content Download, Voice	Rosters
MX Superfly	Sports	THQ	NA: November 20, 2002; PAL: March 21, 2003	Content Download	Riders, Bikes, Tracks
MX vs. ATV Unleashed	Racing	THQ	NA: March 24, 2005; EU: June 24, 2005	Online Multiplayer, Scoreboards, Content Download, Voice, Friends	Updates
MX World Tour: Featuring Jaime Little	Racing	Crave Entertainment	NA: April 6, 2005	Xbox Live Aware	
Myst IV: Revelation	Adventure	Ubisoft	NA: March 28, 2005	Xbox Live Aware	
NASCAR 06: Total Team Control	Racing	EA Sports	NA: August 30, 2005; EU: October 21, 2005	Online Multiplayer, Scoreboards, Voice, Friends	
NASCAR 07	Racing	EA Sports	NA: November 14, 2006; EU: December 5, 2006; AU: December 12, 2006	Online Multiplayer, Scoreboards, Voice, Friends	
NASCAR 2005: Chase For The Cup	Racing	EA Sports	NA: August 31, 2004; EU: September 9, 2004	Online Multiplayer, Scoreboards, Voice, Friends	
Nascar Heat 2002	Racing	Infograms	NA: November 15, 2001	System Link	
NBA 2K3	Sports	Sega	NA: 7 October 2002 EU: 17 April 2003	Content Download. Online Multiplayer, Scoreboards, Voice	
NBA 2K6	Sports	2K Sports	NA: September 26, 2005; EU: March 10, 2006	Online Multiplayer, Scoreboards, Content Download, Friends, Voice	Rosters
NBA 2K7	Sports	2K Sports	NA: September 25, 2006; AU: October 20, 2006; EU: October 27, 2006	Online Multiplayer, Scoreboards, Content Download, Friends, Voice	Rosters
NBA Ballers: Phenom	Sports	2K Sports	NA: March 31, 2006	Online Multiplayer, Scoreboards, Voice, Friends	
NBA Inside Drive 2004	Sports	Microsoft Game Studios	NA: November 18, 2003	Online Multiplayer, Scoreboards, Content Download, System Link, XSN, Voice, Friends	Rosters
NBA Jam	Sports	Acclaim Entertainment	NA: September 23, 2003; EU: November 7, 2003	NA only: Content Download	Teams
NBA Live 2005	Sports	EA Sports	NA: October 26, 2004 EU: October 29, 2004	NA only: Online Multiplayer, Scoreboards, Content Download, Voice, Friends	Rosters
NBA Live 06	Sports	EA Sports	NA: September 26, 2005; EU: October 7, 2005	NA only: Online Multiplayer, Scoreboards, Content Download, Voice, Friends	Rosters
NBA Live 07	Sports	EA Sports	NA: September 25, 2006; EU: October 6, 2006; AU: October 12, 2006	NA only: Online Multiplayer, Scoreboards, Content Download, Voice, Friends	
NBA Street V3	Sports	EA Sports BIG	NA: February 8, 2005; EU: February 18, 2005	NA only: Online Multiplayer, Scoreboards, Voice, Friends	
NCAA College Basketball 2K3	Sports	Sega	NA: December 10, 2002	Online Multiplayer, Voice, Friends	
NCAA Football 2005	Sports	EA Sports	NA: July 15, 2004	Online Multiplayer, Scoreboards, Voice, Friends	
NCAA Football 06	Sports	EA Sports	NA: July 11, 2005	Online Multiplayer, Scoreboards, Voice, Friends	
NCAA Football 07	Sports	EA Sports	NA: July 18, 2006	Online Multiplayer, Scoreboards, System Link, Voice, Friends	
NCAA Football 08	Sports	EA Sports	NA: July 17, 2007	Online Multiplayer, Scoreboards, Voice, Friends	
NCAA March Madness 06	Sports	EA Sports	NA: October 12, 2005	Online Multiplayer, Scoreboards, Voice, Friends	
NCAA March Madness 2005	Sports	EA Sports	NA: November 16, 2004	Online Multiplayer, Scoreboards, Voice, Friends	
Need for Speed: Most Wanted	Racing	Electronic Arts	NA: November 15, 2005; EU: November 25, 2005; AU: 2005	Online Multiplayer, Scoreboards, Voice, Friends	
Need for Speed: Underground 2	Racing	Electronic Arts	NA: November 15, 2004; EU: November 19, 2004	Online Multiplayer, Scoreboards, Voice, Friends	
Neighbours from Hell	Strategy	JoWood Productions	EU: March 4, 2005	Xbox Live Aware	
NFL Fever 2003	Sports	Microsoft Game Studios	NA: August 5, 2002; EU: November 1, 2002	Online Multiplayer, Scoreboards, Content Download, System Link, Friends, Voice	Updates, Rosters
NFL Fever 2004	Sports	Microsoft Game Studios	NA: August 27, 2003; EU: September 19, 2003	Online Multiplayer, Scoreboards, Content Download, System Link, XSN, Voice, Friends	Updates, Rosters
NFL Head Coach	Sports	EA Sports	NA: June 20, 2006	Online Multiplayer, Scoreboards, Content Download, Voice, Friends	Rosters
NFL Street 2	Sports	EA Sports BIG	NA: December 22, 2004; EU: January 28, 2005	NA only: Online Multiplayer, Scoreboards, Friends, Voice	
NHL 06	Sports	EA Sports	NA: September 6, 2005; EU: September 16, 2005	Online Multiplayer, Scoreboards, Content Download, Voice, Friends	Rosters
NHL 07	Sports	EA Sports	NA: September 12, 2006; AU: September 21, 2006; EU: September 22, 2006	Online Multiplayer, Scoreboards, Content Download, Voice, Friends	Rosters
NHL 2005	Sports	EA Sports	NA: September 20, 2004; EU: September 24, 2004	Online Multiplayer, Scoreboards, Content Download (Only NA Version)	Rosters
NHL 2K6	Sports	2K Sports	NA: September 7, 2005; EU: March 10, 2006	Online Multiplayer, Scoreboards, Content Download, Friends, Voice	Rosters
NHL 2K7	Sports	2K Sports	NA: September 12, 2006; EU: October 6, 2006; AU: October 20, 2006	Online Multiplayer, Scoreboards, Content Download, Friends, Voice	Rosters
NHL Rivals 2004	Sports	Xbox Game Studios	NA: November 18, 2003	Online Multiplayer, Scoreboards, Content Download, System Link, XSN, Friends	Rivals, Logos
Ninja Gaiden	Action-adventure	Tecmo	NA: March 2, 2004; JP: March 11, 2004; EU: May 14, 2004	Scoreboards, Content Download	Tournament Notices, Gameplay Improvements, Arenas, Gear, Camera Updates
Ninja Gaiden Black	Action-adventure	Tecmo	NA: September 20, 2005; JP: September 29, 2005; EU: October 21, 2005	Scoreboards	
Open Season	Action-adventure	Ubisoft	NA: September 18, 2006 EU: October 6, 2006 AU: November 30, 2006	Xbox Live Aware	
Operation Flashpoint: Elite	Tactical shooter	Codemasters	EU: October 28, 2005; NA: November 8, 2005	Online Multiplayer, Scoreboards, Content Download, System Link, Friends	
Outlaw Golf 2	Sports	Global Star Software	NA: October 21, 2004; EU: February 4, 2005	Online Multiplayer, Scoreboards, Content Download, Voice, Friends	Updates
Outlaw Tennis	Sports	Global Star Software	NA: July 26, 2005; EU: July 29, 2005	Online Multiplayer, Scoreboards, Content Download, Voice, Friends	
Outlaw Volleyball	Sports	Simon & Schuster Interactive	NA: July 9, 2003; JP: October 23, 2003; PAL: November 7, 2003	Online Multiplayer, Scoreboards, Content Download, Voice, Friends	Characters
Outlaw Volleyball Red Hot!	Sports	TDK Interactive	NA: July 9, 2003; JP: October 23, 2003; PAL: November 7, 2003	Content Download	Updates
OutRun 2	Racing	Microsoft Game Studios	EU: October 1, 2004; NA: October 25, 2004; JP: January 25, 2005	Online Multiplayer, Scoreboards, System Link, Voice, Friends, Game Clips	
OutRun 2006: Coast 2 Coast	Racing	Sega	EU: March 31, 2006; AU: April 6, 2006; NA: April 25, 2006; KO: July 20, 2006	Online Multiplayer, Scoreboards, Content Download, System Link, Voice, Friends	
Painkiller: Hell Wars	First-person shooter	DreamCatcher Interactive	WW: July 25, 2006	Online Multiplayer, System Link, Voice, Friends	
Panzer Elite Action: Fields of Glory	First-person shooter	JoWooD Productions	EU: August 11, 2006	Online multiplayer, Content Download, Friends	
Pariah	First-person shooter	Groove Games	NA: May 3, 2005; EU: May 6, 2005; AU: May 25, 2005	Online Multiplayer, Scoreboards, Content Download, System Link, Friends, Voice	
Phantasy Star Online Episode I & II	Action RPG	Sega	JP: January 16, 2003; NA: April 15, 2003; EU: May 23, 2003	Online Multiplayer, Friends, Voice, Content Download	Updates, Quests
Phantom Dust	Action	Majesco	JP: September 23, 2004; NA: March 15, 2005	Online Multiplayer, Scoreboards, Content Download, System Link, Voice, Friends	Skills
Pinball Hall of Fame: The Gottlieb Collection	Pinball	Crave Entertainment	NA: November 18, 2004	Scoreboards, Friends	
Playboy: The Mansion	Simulation	Arush Entertainment	NA: January 25, 2005; PAL: March 4, 2005	Content Download, Scoreboards	Updates
Plus Plumb 2	Puzzle	Takuyo	JP: January 15, 2004	Online Multiplayer, Friends, Voice, Scoreboards	
Pocket Bike Racer	Racing	Burger King	NA: November 19, 2006	Online Multiplayer, Scoreboards, Voice	
Pool Shark 2	Sports	Zoo Digital Publishing	EU: November 19, 2004	Online Multiplayer, Scoreboards, Voice, Friends	
Powerdrome	Racing	Mad Duck Productions	NA: April 27, 2004	Online Multiplayer, Scoreboards, System Link, Voice, Friends	
Prince of Persia: The Sands of Time	Action-adventure	Ubisoft	NA: 18 November 2003; EU: 20 February 2004	Xbox Live Aware	
Prince of Persia: The Two Thrones	Action-adventure	Ubisoft	NA: December 1, 2005; EU: December 9, 2005	Xbox Live Aware	
Prince of Persia: Warrior Within	Action-adventure	Ubisoft	NA: December 2, 2004; EU: December 3, 2004	Xbox Live Aware, Scoreboards, Friends, Content Download	Levels
Pro Beach Soccer	Sports	Wanadoo	EU: August 29, 2003; NA: November 14, 2003 (PC, Xbox)	System Link	
Pro Evolution Soccer 4	Sports	Konami	EU: November 26, 2004; AU: December 3, 2004; NA: February 1, 2005	Online Multiplayer, Scoreboards, Voice, Friends	
Pro Evolution Soccer 5	Sports	Konami	NA: February 7, 2006 EU: October 21, 2005	Online Multiplayer, Scoreboards, Voice, Friends	
Pro Fishing Challenge	Fishing	Atlus	NA: August 31, 2004	Online Multiplayer, Scoreboards, Content Download, Friends, Voice	
Project Gotham Racing 2	Racing	Microsoft Game Studios	NA: 18 November 2003; EU: 28 November 2003	Online Multiplayer, Scoreboards, Content Download, System Link, Voice, Friends	Courses, Cars
Project: Snowblind	First-person shooter	Eidos Interactive	NA: February 22, 2005; EU: March 11, 2005	Online Multiplayer, Scoreboards, Content Download, Clans, System Link, Voice, Friends	Multiplayer Maps
Psyvariar 2 Extend Edition	Run and gun	Success Corporation	JP: October 28, 2004	Scoreboards, Friends	
Pump It Up: Exceed	Rhythm	Andamiro	NA: August 31, 2005	Content Download, Voice, Friends	Step Editor
The Punisher	Shooter	THQ	NA: January 17, 2005 EU: March 4, 2005	Xbox Live Aware	
Pure Pinball	Pinball	Legendo Entertainment	NA: May 28, 2003	Scoreboards	
Rallisport Challenge 2	Racing	Microsoft Game Studios	NA: 4 May 2004; EU: 21 May 2004	Online Multiplayer, Scoreboards, Content Download, System Link, Voice, XSN, Friends	Vehicles, Careers, Skins
Rapala Pro Fishing	Fishing	Activision	NA: 25 August 2004	Scoreboards	
Raze's Hell	Third-person shooter	Majesco	NA: April 21, 2005; EU: February 17, 2006	Online Multiplayer, System Link, Voice, Friends	
Red Dead Revolver	Action-adventure	Rockstar Games	NA: May 4, 2004 PAL: June 11, 2004	Xbox Live Aware	
Return to Castle Wolfenstein: Tides of War	First-person shooter	Activision	NA: May 6, 2003; EU: May 15, 2003	Online Multiplayer, Scoreboards, Content Download, System Link, Voice, Friends	Maps
Richard Burns Rally	Racing	SCI	EU: 9 July 2004; AU: 16 July 2004; JP: 22 September 2005	Scoreboards	
Robotech: Invasion	First-person shooter	Global Star	NA: October 5, 2004; EU: January 14, 2005	Online Multiplayer, System Link, Voice, Friends	
Rogue Trooper	Third-person shooter	Eidos Interactive	EU: 21 April 2006; NA: 23 May 2006	Online Multiplayer, System Link, Friends, Voice	
Room Zoom	Racing	Jaleco	NA: July 13, 2004	Online Multiplayer, Voice, Friends	
Rugby League 2	Sports	Tru Blu Entertainment	AU: July 21, 2006	Online Multiplayer, Voice, Scoreboards, Friends	
Run Like Hell	Third-person shooter	Interplay Entertainment	NA: April 9, 2003; EU: June 18, 2004	Content Download	Levels, Skins
Samurai Shodown V	Fighting	SNK Playmore	NA: 18 January 2006; EU: 26 May 2006	Online Multiplayer, Scoreboards, Voice, Friends	
Secret Weapons Over Normandy	Action	LucasArts	NA: November 18, 2003; EU: November 28, 2003	Content Download	Planes, Camo, Missions
SEGA GT Online	Racing	Sega	JP: December 25, 2003; NA: January 27, 2004; PAL: February 6, 2004	Online Multiplayer, Scoreboards, Content Download, System Link, Voice, Friends	Updates, Tournament Unlocks
SEGA Sports NBA 2K3	Sports	Sega	NA: October 8, 2002; EU: April 17, 2003	Online Multiplayer, Content Download, Voice, Friends	Rosters
SEGA Sports NFL 2K3	Sports	Sega	NA: August 12, 2002; EU: April 17, 2003	Online Multiplayer, Content Download, Voice, Friends	Rosters
SEGA Sports NHL 2K3	Sports	Sega	NA: November 19, 2002; EU: March 28, 2003	Online Multiplayer, Voice, Friends, Content Download	
Serious Sam	First-person shooter	Gotham Games	12 November 2002	System Link	
Serious Sam II	First-person shooter	2K Games	NA: October 11, 2005	Online Multiplayer, System Link, Voice, Friends	
Shadow Ops: Red Mercury	First-person shooter	Atari	NA: June 15, 2004; PAL: June 18, 2004	Online Multiplayer, System Link, Voice, Friends	
Shattered Union	Turn-based tactics	2K Games	NA: October 17, 2005; EU: October 21, 2005	Online Multiplayer, System Link, Voice, Friends	
Sid Meier's Pirates!	Strategy	Atari Interactive	NA: July 11, 2005	Scoreboards, Content Download, Friends	Flags, Sails, Maps, Action Sequences, Patterns
Ski Racing 2005	Sports	JoWooD Productions	EU: December 3, 2004	Scoreboards, Friends	
Ski Racing 2006	Sports	JoWooD Productions	EU: November 11, 2005	Scoreboards, Friends	
Sniper Elite	Tactical shooter	Namco Hometek	EU: 7 October 2005; NA: 18 October 2005	Online Multiplayer, Scoreboards, Voice, Friends	
Soldier of Fortune 2: Double Helix	First-person shooter	Activision	NA: June 18, 2003; EU: June 20, 2003; AU: July 3, 2003	Online Multiplayer, Content Download, System Link, Voice, Friends	Levels
Spikeout: Battle Street	Beat 'em up	Sega	JP: March 24, 2005; NA: March 29, 2005; EU: April 22, 2005	Online Multiplayer, Content Download, System Link, Voice, Scoreboards, Friends	Updates
Splat Magazine Renegade Paintball	First-person shooter	Global Star Software	NA: October 11, 2005	Online Multiplayer, System Link, Voice, Friends	
Spy vs. Spy	Platform	Global Star Software	NA: April 6, 2005; PAL: April 29, 2005	Online Multiplayer, System Link, Friends, Voice	
Stacked with Daniel Negreanu	Gambling	Myelin Media	NA: May 30, 2006	Online Multiplayer, Scoreboards, System Link, Friends, Voice	
Star Wars: Battlefront	Third-person shooter	LucasArts	NA: September 21, 2004	Online Multiplayer, Scoreboards, Friends, Voice, Content Download, System link	Updates, Maps, Languages
Star Wars Battlefront II	Third-person shooter	LucasArts	EU: October 31, 2005; NA: November 1, 2005	Online Multiplayer, Scoreboards, Friends, Voice, Content Download, System link	Updates, Game Modes, Maps, Characters, Languages
Star Wars: The Clone Wars	Action	LucasArts	NA: April 22, 2003; EU: May 9, 2003	Online Multiplayer, Content Download, System Link, Voice, Friends	Maps
Star Wars Jedi Knight: Jedi Academy	First-person shooter	LucasArts	NA: November 18, 2003; EU: November 21, 2003	Online Multiplayer, System Link, Voice, Friends	
Star Wars: Knights of the Old Republic	Role-playing	LucasArts	NA: July 15, 2003; EU: September 12, 2003	Content Download	Equipment Store
Star Wars Knights of the Old Republic II: The Sith Lords	Role-playing	LucasArts	NA: December 6, 2004; EU: February 11, 2005; AU: February 15, 2005	Content Download	
Star Wars Republic Commando	Tactical shooter	LucasArts	NA: February 28, 2005; EU: March 4, 2005	Online Multiplayer, Content Download, System Link, Voice, Friends	Maps
Steel Battalion: Line of Contact	Simulation	Capcom	JP: February 26, 2004; NA: February 27, 2004; EU: March 26, 2004	Online Multiplayer, Content Download, System Link, Voice, Friends	Updates
Still Life	Adventure	The Adventure Company	NA: June 6, 2005 EU: June 3, 2005	Xbox Live Aware	
Stolen	Stealth	Hip Games	EU: April 8, 2005; NA: April 22, 2005	Xbox Live Aware	
Street Fighter Anniversary Collection	Fighting	Capcom	JP: October 28, 2004; EU: October 29, 2004; NA: February 22, 2005	Online Multiplayer, Scoreboards, Content Download, Voice, Friends	Updates
Street Racing Syndicate	Racing	Namco	NA: August 31, 2004; PAL: May 6, 2005	Online Multiplayer, Scoreboards, System Link, Voice, Friends	
Strike Force Bowling	Sports	Crave Entertainment	NA: May 10, 2004	Xbox Live Aware	
The Suffering: Ties That Bind	Shooter	Midway Games	NA: September 26, 2005 EU: October 28, 2005	Xbox Live Aware	
SVC Chaos: SNK vs. Capcom	Fighting	SNK Playmore	NA: 28 September 2004; JP: 7 October 2004; EU: 18 March 2005; AU: 13 May 2005	Online Multiplayer, Scoreboards, Friends, Voice	
SWAT: Global Strike Team	Tactical shooter	Vivendi Universal Games	NA: October 29, 2003; EU: December 5, 2003	Scoreboards, Content Download, Voice	Maps
Tenchu: Return from Darkness	Action-adventure	Activision	NA: March 10, 2004; EU: March 19, 2004; JP: May 27, 2004	Online Multiplayer, Voice, Friends	
Tetris Worlds Online Edition	Puzzle	THQ	NA: June 24, 2002; PAL: September 20, 2002	Online Multiplayer, Scoreboards, Content Download, Voice, Friends	Updates
The Incredibles	Action-adventure	THQ	NA: October 28, 2004; GER: November 22, 2004; JP: December 2, 2004	Content Download, Friends	Battle Arenas
Thousand Land	Role Playing	FromSoftware Inc	JP: March 20, 2003	Online Multiplayer, Scoreboard, Content Download, Voice	
Tiger Woods PGA TOUR 06	Sports	EA Sports	NA: September 20, 2005; EU: October 7, 2005	Online Multiplayer, Scoreboards, Friends, Voice	
Tiger Woods PGA TOUR 07	Sports	EA Sports	AU: September 21, 2006; EU: September 22, 2006; NA: October 10, 2006	Online Multiplayer, Scoreboards, Voice, Friends	
Tiger Woods PGA TOUR 2005	Sports	EA Sports	NA: September 20, 2004; EU: September 24, 2004	NA Only: Online Multiplayer, Scoreboards, Voice, Friends	
TimeSplitters 2	First-person shooter	Electronic Arts	NA: 8 October 2002; EU: 18 October 2002; AU: 4 November 2002	System Link	
TimeSplitters: Future Perfect	First-person shooter	Electronic Arts	NA: 21 March 2005; EU: 24 March 2005	Online Multiplayer, Scoreboards, Content Download, System Link, Friends	Updates
TOCA Race Driver	Racing	Codemasters	EU: 28 March 2003; NA: 15 April 2003	Online Multiplayer, Content Download, System Link	Updates
ToCA Race Driver 2	Racing	Codemasters	NA: 14 April 2004; EU: 23 April 2004	Online Multiplayer, Scoreboards, Voice, Content Download, System Link, Friends	Updates
TOCA Race Driver 3	Racing	Codemasters	NA: 22 February 2006; EU: 24 February 2006; AU: 13 October 2006	Online Multiplayer, Scoreboards, System Link, Voice, Friends	
ToeJam & Earl 3: Mission to Earth	Action-adventure	Sega	NA: October 23, 2002; EU: March 7, 2003	Content Download	Characters, Environments
Tom Clancy's Ghost Recon	Tactical shooter	Ubisoft	NA: November 11, 2002; EU: December 6, 2002	Online Multiplayer, Content Download, System Link, Voice	Updates
Tom Clancy's Ghost Recon 2	Tactical shooter	Ubisoft	NA: November 16, 2004; EU: November 26, 2004	Online Multiplayer, Scoreboards, Content Download, System Link, Voice, Friends	Maps, Weapons, Skins, Game Modes
Tom Clancy's Ghost Recon 2: Summit Strike	Tactical shooter	Ubisoft	NA: August 3, 2005; EU: August 26, 2005	Online Multiplayer, Scoreboards, Content Download, System Link, Voice, Teams	Maps, Game Modes, Weapons, Kit Restrictions
Tom Clancy's Ghost Recon Advanced Warfighter	Tactical shooter	Ubisoft	NA: March 7, 2006; EU: March 17, 2006	Online Multiplayer, Scoreboards, Clans, Content Download, System Link, Voice, Friends	
Tom Clancy's Ghost Recon: Island Thunder	Tactical shooter	Ubisoft	NA: August 6, 2003; EU: September 5, 2003; JP: March 11, 2004	Online Multiplayer, Scoreboards, Content Download, System Link, Voice, Friends	Maps, Missions
Tom Clancy's Rainbow Six 3	Tactical shooter	Ubisoft	EU: November 7, 2003; NA: October 28, 2003; JP: July 8, 2004	Online Multiplayer, Scoreboards, Content Download, System Link, Voice, Friends	
Tom Clancy's Rainbow Six 3: Black Arrow	Tactical shooter	Ubisoft	NA: August 5, 2004	Online Multiplayer, Scoreboards, Friends, Voice, Clans, Competitions, Content Download, System Link, Friends	Maps
Tom Clancy's Rainbow Six: Critical Hour	Tactical shooter	Ubisoft	NA: March 14, 2006	Online Multiplayer, Scoreboards, Clans, Content Download, System Link, Voice, Friends	Updates
Tom Clancy's Rainbow Six: Lockdown	Tactical shooter	Ubisoft	NA: September 6, 2005; EU: September 9, 2005; JP: September 22, 2005	Online Multiplayer, Scoreboards, Content Download, System Link, Voice, Friends	Updates
Tom Clancy's Splinter Cell	Tactical shooter	Ubisoft	NA: November 17, 2002	Content Download	Updates, Missions
Tom Clancy's Splinter Cell: Chaos Theory	Tactical shooter	Ubisoft	NA: March 28, 2005; EU: April 1, 2005	Online Multiplayer, Scoreboards, Content Download, System Link, Voice	Updates, Missions, Maps
Tom Clancy's Splinter Cell: Double Agent	Tactical shooter	Ubisoft	NA: October 24, 2006; AU: October 26, 2006; EU: October 27, 2006	Online Multiplayer, Scoreboards, System Link, Friends, Voice	
Tom Clancy's Splinter Cell: Pandora Tomorrow	Tactical shooter	Ubisoft	NA: March 23, 2004; EU: March 26, 2004	Online Multiplayer, Scoreboards, Content Download, System Link, Voice, Friends	Updates, Maps
Tony Hawk's American Wasteland	Sports	Activision	NA: October 18, 2005; EU: October 28, 2005	Online Multiplayer, Voice, Friends	
Tony Hawk's Pro Skater 2x	Sports	Activision	NA: November 15, 2001	System Link	
Tony Hawk's Pro Skater 3	Sports	Activision	EU: March 14, 2002; NA: March 15, 2002	System Link	
Tony Hawk's Underground	Sports	Activision	NA: October 27, 2003; EU: November 21, 2003	System Link	
Top Spin	Sports	Microsoft Game Studios	NA: October 28, 2003; EU: November 7, 2003	Online Multiplayer, Scoreboards, Content Download, System Link, Voice, XSN, Friends	Updates
Trigger Man	Shooter	Crave Entertainment	NA: September 28, 2004 PAL: August 12, 2005	Xbox Live Aware	
Trivial Pursuit Unhinged	Family/Board Game	Atari Interactive	NA: March 24, 2004	Online Multiplayer, Friends, Voice	
Tron 2.0: Killer App	First-person shooter	Buena Vista Interactive	NA: November 4, 2004; EU: November 26, 2004	Online Multiplayer, Scoreboards, Content Download, System Link, Friends	Levels, Colors
UEFA Champions League 2004-2005	Sports	EA Sports	EU: February 4, 2005	Online Multiplayer, Scoreboards, Voice, Friends	
Ultra Bust-a-Move	Puzzle	Majesco	NA: November 4, 2004; JP: January 27, 2005; PAL: May 19, 2006	Online Multiplayer, Scoreboards, Voice, Friends	
Unreal Championship	First-person shooter	Epic Games	NA: November 12, 2002; EU: November 29, 2002	Online Multiplayer, Scoreboards, Friends, Voice, Content Download, System Link	Updates, Maps
Unreal Championship 2: The Liandri Conflict	First-person shooter	Epic Games	NA: April 18, 2005; EU: April 22, 2005	Online Multiplayer, Scoreboards, Friends, Voice, Content Download, System Link, Rankings	Updates, Maps
Unreal II: The Awakening	First-person shooter	Epic Games	NA: February 10, 2004; EU: April 23, 2004	Online Multiplayer, Content Download, System Link, Friends, Voice	Updates, Characters, Combos, Maps
Urban Chaos: Riot Response	First-person shooter	Eidos Interactive	NA: June 13, 2006 EU: May 19, 2006	Online Multiplayer, Scoreboards, Friends, Voice	
Van Helsing	Action-adventure	Vivendi Universal Games	NA: May 7, 2004; EU: May 14, 2004	Scoreboards (Only NA version)	
Vietcong: Purple Haze	First-person shooter	Gathering	NA: March 26, 2003; PAL: April 17, 2003	Online Multiplayer, Scoreboards, Content Download, Voice, Friends	Maps
Virtual Pool: Tournament Edition	Sports	Global Star Software	WW: May 11, 2005	Xbox Live Aware	
Warpath	First-person shooter	Groove Games	NA: July 24, 2006	Online Multiplayer, Scoreboards, System Link, Voice, Friends	
Whacked!	Party	Microsoft Game Studios	NA: October 8, 2002; EU: November 29, 2002; JP: January 16, 2003	Online Multiplayer (not AUS version), System Link, Voice	
World Championship Poker	Gambling	Crave Entertainment	NA: November 30, 2004	Online Multiplayer, Scoreboards, Friends, Voice	
World Championship Poker 2: Featuring Howard Lederer	Gambling	Crave Entertainment	NA: November 3, 2005; PAL: April 28, 2006	Online Multiplayer, Scoreboards, Friends, Voice	
World Championship Pool 2004	Gambling	Jaleco	NA: December 8, 2003; PAL: June 25, 2004	Online Multiplayer, Friends, Voice	
World Championship Rugby	Sports	Acclaim	EU: 8 April 2004	System Link	
World Championship Snooker 2004	Gambling	Codemasters	EU: June 25, 2004; AU: July 2, 2004	Online Multiplayer, Scoreboards, Friends, Voice	
World Poker Tour	Gambling	2K Sports	NA: October 18, 2005; EU: March 10, 2006	Online Multiplayer, Scoreboards, Friends, Voice	
World Racing 2	Racing	Evolved Games	NA: September 29, 2005	Content Download, System Link, Friends	Updates
World Series of Poker	Gambling	Activision	NA: August 31, 2005; EU: February 24, 2006	Online Multiplayer, Scoreboards, Content Download, System Link, Voice, Friends	Updates
World Snooker Championship 2005	Gambling	Sega	EU: 15 April 2005	Online Multiplayer, Scoreboards, Friends, Voice	
World War II Combat: Road to Berlin	First-person shooter	Groove Games	NA: January 24, 2006	Online Multiplayer, System Link, Voice, Friends	
World War II Combat: Iwo Jima	First-person shooter	Groove Games	NA: July 21, 2006	Online Multiplayer, System Link, Voice, Friends	
Worms 3D: Special Edition	Strategy	Acclaim Entertainment	EU: 31 October 2003; NA: 1 March 2005	Online Multiplayer, Voice	
Worms 4: Mayhem	Strategy	Majesco	EU: July 29, 2005; NA: October 4, 2005	Online Multiplayer, Voice, Friends	
Worms Forts: Under Siege	Strategy	Sega	EU: November 19, 2004 NA: March 15, 2005	Online Multiplayer, Scoreboards, Voice, Friends	
WWE WrestleMania 21	Sports	THQ Inc.	NA: April 20, 2005; EU: May 27, 2005	Online Multiplayer, Scoreboards, Content Download, Friends	Updates
Xbox Live Arcade	Application	Microsoft Game Studios	NA: November 6, 2004	Online Multiplayer, Scoreboards, Xbox Live Aware, Content Download, Voice	Games
Xbox Music Mixer	Application	Microsoft Game Studios	NA: October 27, 2003; EU: November 28, 2003	Content Download	Karaoke Tracks, Visualizers
Xbox VideoChat	Application	Microsoft Game Studios	JP: November 25, 2004	Online Multiplayer	
XIII	First-person shooter	Ubisoft	NA: November 18, 2003; EU: November 28, 2003	Online Multiplayer, Scoreboards, System Link	
X-Men Legends II: Rise of Apocalypse	Action	Activision	NA: September 20, 2005; PAL: October 14, 2005	Online Multiplayer, Friends, Voice	
Xyanide	Shoot 'em up	Evolved Games	NA: August 15, 2006	Xbox Live Aware, Scoreboards, Friends	
Yetisports Arctic Adventures	Party	JoWooD Productions	EU: July 18, 2005	Scoreboards, Friends	
Zillernet	Karaoke	Microsoft Game Studios	KR: July 10, 2005	Content Download	

== Unreleased games ==
Game title	Genre	Developer	Features Supported	Content Download
Re-Volt	Racing	Acclaim Studios London	Online Multiplayer, Scoreboards, Content Download	Cars, Maps, Premium Subscription
Lamborghini	Racing	Majesco	Online Multiplayer	

== See also ==
- List of Xbox games
- List of Xbox System Link games
- Insignia (Xbox)
