= ESPN NBA Basketball =

ESPN NBA Basketball may refer to:

- ESPN NBA Basketball (video game), a 2003 video game in the NBA 2K series
- NBA on ESPN, television broadcast
