= Ultramix =

Ultramix is a series of Dance Dance Revolution music video games developed by Konami

In video games:

- Dance Dance Revolution Ultramix
  - Dance Dance Revolution Ultramix 2
  - Dance Dance Revolution Ultramix 3
  - Dance Dance Revolution Ultramix 4
- Dancing Stage Unleashed, the European branded series based on Dance Dance Revolution Ultramix
  - Dancing Stage Unleashed 2
  - Dancing Stage Unleashed 3

In music:

- "Stakeout (Ultra:mix)", a remix of the Freezepop song used in Dance Dance Revolution Ultramix 3
