= Pro Fishing Challenge =

2004 video game

- Developer: Opus
- Publisher: Atlus
- Platform: Xbox
- Release: NA: August 31, 2004
- Genre: Fishing
- Modes: Single-player, multiplayer

Pro Fishing Challenge is a 2004 fishing video game developed by Japanese developer Opus and published by Atlus for the Xbox.

It was the first fishing game on the console to feature Xbox Live support, allowing up to eight players. Multiplayer on Xbox Live was available to players until April 15, 2010. Pro Fishing Challenge is now playable online again on the replacement Xbox Live servers called Insignia.

== Gameplay ==
The game features customizable characters, four lakes, and fish with different eating habits and schedules.

In tournament mode, the player sets the weather and fishing location and competes online (or with an AI player) in a five-round tournament to see who can catch the biggest fish. In free fishing mode, there are no constraints. In each mode, the player can unlock outfits, new lakes, and other items.

== Critical reception ==
Reception

Aggregate scores
Aggregator	Score
GameRankings	65.96%
Metacritic	62/100

Review scores
Publication	Score
GameSpot	6.6/10
GameZone	8.0/10
IGN	7.2/10
Official Xbox Magazine (US)	6.8/10
TeamXbox	7.1/10

Pro Fishing Challenge received mixed reviews from critics upon release. On Metacritic, the game holds a score of 62/100 based on 11 reviews, indicating "mixed or average reviews". On GameRankings, the game held a score of 65.96% based on 12 reviews.

Game Informer said of Pro Fishing Challenge in a September 2004 review: "A foul dead fish aroma surrounds every gameplay aspect. The techniqes [sic] of casting, jigging, setting the hook, and landing the fish are miserably executed."

Game Vortex described the game as "completely true to the nature of fishing and features all of the tiny nuances dropped in other games", while adding, "This makes for a deep experience, although it doesn't really make for a fun game."
