= Motocross Mania 3 =

2005 video game

- North American PS2 box art
- Developer: Deibus Studios
- Publishers: PAL: Global Star; NA: 2K
- Series: Motocross Mania
- Platforms: PlayStation 2, Xbox
- Release: PAL: April 22, 2005; NA: April 27, 2005
- Genre: Racing
- Modes: Single-player, multiplayer

Motocross Mania 3 is a motocross racing video game developed by British company Deibus Studios and was released in April 2005 for the PlayStation 2 and Xbox. The game was the third in the Motocross Mania series, and the first to be released for sixth-generation consoles. The Xbox version has Xbox Live support, and top scores on tracks that users play are automatically posted to online leaderboards. While Xbox Live for original Xbox games was shut down in 2010, Motocross Mania 3 is supported online on Insignia, the replacement Xbox Live servers.

== Gameplay ==
The game focuses on vehicular combat, and players can use various weapons such as baseball bats and ice picks to attack opponents. Players can also attack without weapons, which involves attacking while airborne, which the game considers as "showing off and kicking ass at the same time". There is a "mania meter", which slows down time similar to bullet time in order to get another opportunity to attack.

One of the modes available is the Championship, in which players compete in a series of races across 20 tracks and try to finish in the top 4 to advance. Before each race in the mode, players can challenge another driver to a best-of-three series, and if the player wins, they win the driver's bike. Another event in the Championship mode is the Battle Royal, in which the player with the most KOs win. Minigames are also present in the game, one of which involves a game of "tag", in which the player who's "it" has 30 seconds to tag another driver or else they explode.

== Reception ==
Reception

Aggregate score
Aggregator	Score	
Aggregator	PS2	Xbox
Metacritic	34/100	38/100

Review scores
Publication	Score	
Publication	PS2	Xbox
GamesMaster	N/A	46%
GameSpot	N/A	3.1/10
IGN	N/A	3.8/10
Official Xbox Magazine (UK)	N/A	4.5/10
Play	62%	N/A
TeamXbox	N/A	5/10

The game received "unfavorable" reviews on both platforms according to the review aggregation website Metacritic. David Clayman of IGN criticized the Xbox version's buggy gameplay and "lack of variety". Clayman also commented that there was a haze on the map, which TeamXbox's Matthew Fisher first called logical due to the first race taking place at dusk, but Fisher then noted that it appears in every level. Fisher also criticized the audio, stating that whenever the drivers crash, it sounds like a water bottle getting crushed, and as a result, called it the "water bottle effect". Brian Ekberg of GameSpot praised the Xbox Live implementation, along with amusing dialogue from characters, but criticized the graphics and poor physics engine.
