= ESPN NBA 2K5 =

2004 basketball video game

- PlayStation 2 cover art featuring Ben Wallace
- Developer: Visual Concepts
- Publishers: Sega; Global Star Software (PAL)
- Programmers: Andrew Marrinson; Nick Verne
- Artist: Alvin Cardona
- Writers: Tor Unsworth; Mark Washington
- Series: NBA 2K
- Platforms: PlayStation 2, Xbox
- Release: NA: September 28, 2004; AU: January 14, 2005 (PS2); AU: January 28, 2005 (Xbox); EU: February 4, 2005
- Genre: Sports
- Modes: Single-player, multiplayer

ESPN NBA 2K5 is a 2004 basketball simulation video game developed by Visual Concepts and co-published by Sega and Global Star Software. It was released in September 2004 for PlayStation 2 and Xbox in North America, and February 2005 in Europe. The sixth installment in the NBA 2K series, it is the successor to ESPN NBA Basketball, and the predecessor to NBA 2K6. Ben Wallace of the Detroit Pistons is the cover athlete; this marks the first time in the series that a player other than Allen Iverson was featured as a cover athlete. It is the last NBA 2K game to be released by Sega before the company sold Visual Concepts to Take-Two Interactive, forming 2K Sports. It is also the third and last game to feature the ESPN branding on its front cover (the ESPN branding would be dropped, making later releases once again known as simply "NBA 2K").

The game strives to realistically depict the experience of basketball, in the National Basketball Association. Players mainly play NBA basketball games in a variety of game modes with real players and teams as well as customizable players. A mode focusing on street basketball is present, as is a mode where the player simulates through a team's NBA season. The game features several aesthetical details, such as crowd animations, camera angles, and commentary.

ESPN NBA 2K5 received positive reviews from critics upon release. The visuals and gameplay were widely acclaimed, while the 24/7 and Association game modes received a mixed response. The low price of the game was also well received.

== Gameplay ==
ESPN NBA 2K5 is a basketball simulation video game which strives to emulate the National Basketball Association. Players mostly play in basketball games in several game modes, with real teams, such as the Detroit Pistons and Boston Celtics. Gameplay follows the rules and objectives of basketball and the game is presented like televised NBA games. Several game modes are available; 24/7 mode allows the player to create their own player, Association mode allows the player to play through an NBA season with a selected team, another mode lets the player compete in basketball tournaments, and a mode where the player plays street basketball is also available. The game features Stuart Scott as a presenter, Bob Fitzgerald and Bill Walton as commentators, and Michele Tafoya as a sideline reporter. The player may customize several aspects of the game, and many aesthetical details are present.

== Development and release ==
In the NBA 2K series, ESPN NBA 2K5 is the successor to ESPN NBA Basketball, and the predecessor to NBA 2K6. It was developed by Visual Concepts and published by both Sega and Global Star Software. It was released for Xbox on September 28, 2004, with a PlayStation 2 version following on September 30, both for North America. In European regions, both versions of the game were released on February 4, 2005.

NBA 2K3, ESPN NBA Basketball, and ESPN NBA 2K5 are the only three games in the series to feature ESPN licensing. Ben Wallace of the Detroit Pistons is the cover athlete. The first five games in the series featured Allen Iverson of the Philadelphia 76ers on the covers. ESPN NBA 2K5 is the last NBA 2K game to be released by Sega before the company sold Visual Concepts to Take Two Interactive, forming 2K Sports.

== Reception ==
Reception

Aggregate score
Aggregator	Score	
Aggregator	PS2	Xbox
Metacritic	83/100	85/100

Review scores
Publication	Score	
Publication	PS2	Xbox
Electronic Gaming Monthly	8/10	8/10
Game Informer	9/10	9/10
GamePro	5/5	5/5
GameRevolution	B	B
GameSpot	8.4/10	8.4/10
GameSpy	4.5/5	4.5/5
GameZone	8.5/10	9/10
IGN	8/10	8.1/10
Official U.S. PlayStation Magazine	4/5	N/A
Official Xbox Magazine (US)	N/A	8.5/10
The Sydney Morning Herald	N/A	4/5

ESPN NBA 2K5 received "favorable" reviews on both platforms according to the review aggregation website Metacritic.

Andrew Reiner of Game Informer praised Visual Concepts for still being able to make subtle improvements over the previous game in the series, despite not implementing drastic overhauls, as was the case with ESPN NBA Basketball and NBA 2K3. He commended how the developers focus on realism; one detail he cited was the sweat players amass as games progress. Reiner called the crowd design "amazing", particularly liking how they react to certain situations, and the said that player models were "superb". Reiner summarized his review by saying, "This is still the best playing, most rewarding, and realistic basketball game that money can buy."

Game Revolution's review praised the visuals and price, but criticized the 24/7 mode for being "broken". Bob Colayco of GameSpot also praised the low price of the game, as well as the "extremely well done" gameplay and visuals. He found the soundtrack "forgettable" and thought the commentary was "good but not great". Both of GameZone's two reviews were positive. They praised the online features, the 24/7 mode, the commentary and soundtrack, the visuals, and the gameplay.

IGN's Hilary Goldstein wrote: "ESPN NBA 2K5 isn't a horrible game by any means, but it's probably Sega's weakest sports game this year. On the surface it looks fine. It plays decently and if you know how to use IsoMotion2, you can definitely enjoy playing offense. There's a lot of fine-tuning needed and it seems pretty clear this game really shouldn't be shipping quite so soon. I just couldn't possibly play any more of the Association. It's not bad, it just isn't great and some of the AI gaffs began to really get on my nerves over time. However, the 24/7 mode is refreshing, even after playing a lot last year. Considering this is a $20 game, it's certainly worth it to pick up just for those nice extra modes. However, if you want to play a real NBA sim, this one may disappoint you. It's too drive-minded and while it tries to create the idea of individuals and personality with the visuals and Association, the gameplay seems to ignore who these players are on the court. I want this to be a great game. I know a lot of other people do as well. But it just isn't great. It's merely good. And in the competitive world of sports sims these days, being good isn't enough."

By July 2006, the PlayStation 2 version of ESPN NBA 2K5 had sold 1 million copies and earned $20 million in the United States. Next Generation ranked it as the 57th highest-selling game launched for the PlayStation 2, Xbox, or GameCube between January 2000 and July 2006 in the United States. Combined console sales of ESPN NBA 2K5 reached 1.6 million units in the United States by July 2006.
