= Xemu (emulator) =

Video game console emulator

- Developer: Matt Borgerson
- Stable release: v0.8.136 / June 8, 2026
- Written in: C, C++, Python, Assembly
- Operating system: Windows, macOS, Linux
- Platform: x86-64, AArch64
- Type: Video game console emulator
- License: GPL-2.0-or-later
- Website: xemu.app
- Repository: GitHub

Xemu is a free and open-source software emulator designed to emulate the hardware of the original Microsoft Xbox, which was launched in 2001, allowing games and homebrew applications to run on modern Windows, macOS, and Linux computers. An Android release has been announced.

The emulator relies on a real Xbox BIOS and other system files (which must be obtained by the user, typically by dumping from their own original Xbox), rather than distributing them with the software. It was written in C, Python, Assembly, and C++.

Xemu offers faster load times, save-state support (AKA snapshot), higher resolution, improved performance, and stability compared to the original console. Despite this, users may still experience varying levels of compatibility and performance issues depending on their hardware and the specific game.

== History ==
The heritage of Xemu traces back to XQEMU, which is a low-level written emulator of the original Xbox (and the related Sega Chihiro arcade hardware), which itself was built on top of the generic machine emulator framework QEMU. The project was started in 2012, with significant contributions from developer named espes. Over time, however, the maintainers recognized that while XQEMU was accurate and low-level, it was not particularly user-friendly or performant for end-users, especially those who simply wanted to play games rather than contribute to development.

In early 2020, developer Matt Borgerson created a fork of XQEMU to create Xemu. The goal of the fork was to preserve compatibility with original Xbox hardware while making tradeoffs in favor of usability and performance. From that point onward, Xemu became the main active project for original Xbox emulation, receiving contributions from a community of open-source developers. Over the years, Xemu has multiple releases improving its features, stability, and compatibility. A notable milestone was version 0.5, which was released on January 4, 2021. It brought significant improvements in audio emulation, graphics rendering, BIOS compatibility, and general usability. Since then the project still continues, with subsequent releases, including recent version, adding further refinements, bug fixes, and ongoing maintenance to support a growing range of original Xbox software under more modern operating systems. It also has a cross-platform feature.

As of 2026, Xemu supports 80% of games considered being playable according to the website.
