= Fila World Tour Tennis =

2002 tennis video game

- Developer: Hokus Pokus
- Publishers: EU: THQ; NA: Xicat Interactive
- Engine: RenderWare
- Platforms: Microsoft Windows, Xbox
- Release: September 2002: Windows; EU: September 2002; NA: March 4, 2003; Xbox; EU: September 2002
- Genre: Sports
- Modes: Single-player, multiplayer

Fila World Tour Tennis is a 2002 tennis video game developed by Hokus Pokus and published in Europe by THQ for Microsoft Windows and the Xbox. The game uses the name and sportswear licence of Fila, although its tennis players and venues are fictional.

The game was designed as a fast-paced, arcade-oriented interpretation of tennis and was frequently compared by contemporary reviewers with Sega's Virtua Tennis.

== Gameplay ==
Fila World Tour Tennis presents tennis from a third-person perspective and includes singles, doubles and mixed-doubles matches. Its principal modes include quick matches, arcade tournaments and a career-oriented challenge mode.

In the career mode, the player begins near the bottom of a fictional world ranking and attempts to reach the top by entering and winning tournaments. Tournament entry, training and equipment require in-game money, making financial management part of the player's progression. Training activities function as minigames and allow the player to improve particular abilities, including serving and shot accuracy.

The playable athletes are fictional rather than real professional tennis players. The Fila licence is instead represented through branded clothing and equipment worn by the characters. Matches are played on several court surfaces, including grass, clay and synthetic courts, with both indoor and outdoor venues.

The game supports local multiplayer for up to four players. Although pre-release reports described planned online tournaments, the released Windows version reviewed by Gameswelt did not support network or Internet play.

== Development and release ==
Fila World Tour Tennis was developed by Hokus Pokus using the RenderWare engine from Criterion Software. It was published and distributed in Europe by THQ under licence from Fila Sport.

THQ's collaboration with Fila was announced in 2001 as a worldwide licensing agreement covering games for personal computers and consoles. Fila World Tour Tennis was identified as one of the first titles produced under the agreement.

Pre-release coverage described four intended modes, 200 computer-controlled opponents and more than 80 motion-captured tennis movements. It also announced online multiplayer tournaments for as many as 64 participants. Several of the proposed online features were not included in at least the final Windows release, which offered local multiplayer but no network or Internet play.

The Windows and Xbox versions were released in Europe in September 2002. A Windows edition was subsequently published in the United States by Xicat Interactive on March 4, 2003.

== Reception ==
Reception to Fila World Tour Tennis was mixed to negative. Reviewers generally praised its speed, court design and character animations, but frequently criticised its imprecise controls, limited tactical depth and lack of real professional players.

Marc Heiland of Gameswelt considered the career mode enjoyable and praised the graphics, motion-captured animation and three-dimensional venues. He nevertheless identified problems with the artificial intelligence and occasionally imprecise controls, concluding that Virtua Tennis remained the stronger game. The publication's Xbox reviewer, Sascha Szopko, was more critical of the sparse presentation, limited selection of modes and use of fictional players and stadiums, although he described the career-based challenge mode as the game's strongest feature.

Justin Stolzenberg of PC Games called the game an above-average but unsuccessful imitation of Virtua Tennis. He praised its clean animations, high resolutions and detailed stadiums, but criticised the character models and sluggish controls. The publication awarded the Windows version 6.0 out of 10.

Jeuxvideo.com criticised the Windows version's inconsistent controls, difficulty in directing shots and excessively fast ball and player movement. The reviewer found the motion-captured animations and sound effects acceptable, but concluded that the lack of control precision prevented the game from competing successfully with Virtua Tennis or Tennis Masters Series 2003. It received a score of 11 out of 20.

Peter Grubmair of GameZone praised the fast pace, fluid animations and court designs, but found the controls inaccurate and the differences between shot types insufficiently pronounced. He described it as a serviceable arcade tennis game rather than a detailed simulation and awarded it 5.8 out of 10.
