= Dancing Stage Unleashed =

2004 video game

- Developer: Konami Digital Entertainment GmbH
- Publisher: Konami
- Designer: KDE GmbH
- Series: Dance Dance Revolution and Bemani
- Platform: Microsoft Xbox
- Release: EU: March 12, 2004
- Genres: Music and exercise
- Modes: Single-player, Multiplayer

Dancing Stage Unleashed, or DS Unleashed, was released by Konami Digital Entertainment GmbH to the European Xbox audience on March 12, 2004. A sister release to the North American Dance Dance Revolution Ultramix, it features the same look and feel and the same options as Ultramix, including online play and content download through Xbox Live. Unleashed has a unique soundtrack and features music from Big Brovaz, Blondie and The Wonder Stuff as well as original tracks from Konami's in-house artists. The original release was followed by two sequels, Dancing Stage Unleashed 2 and 3, released May 13, 2005 and March 17, 2006, for the Xbox in Europe.

Dancing Stage Unleashed is supported online on the replacement online servers for the Xbox called Insignia.

== Music ==
Songs unique to Dancing State Unleashed:

- A Town Called Malice – The Jam
- Alright – Supergrass
- Circles (Just My Good Time) – Busface feat. Mademoiselle EB
- Get It On – Intenso Project feat. Lisa Scott-Lee
- Hanging On The Telephone – Blondie
- Hip Teens Don't Wear Blue Jeans – Frank Pop Ensemble
- I See You Baby (Fatboy Slim Radio Edit) – Groove Armada
- Hot Stuff – Donna Summer
- Love Machine – Girls Aloud
- Some Girls – Rachel Stevens
- Step On – Happy Mondays
- Where's Your Head At? – Basement Jaxx
- Wonderful Night – Fatboy Slim

== Reception ==
Dancing Stage Unleashed was a hit in the United Kingdom, with sales above 1 million units by February 2004.

Preceded by nothing	the Unleashed series 2004-06	Succeeded by the Universe series
