= ESPN NBA Basketball (video game) =

2003 video game

- Xbox cover art featuring Allen Iverson
- Developer: Visual Concepts
- Publisher: Sega
- Series: NBA 2K
- Platforms: PlayStation 2, Xbox
- Release: NA: October 21, 2003; EU: November 28, 2003
- Genre: Sports
- Modes: Single-player, multiplayer

ESPN NBA Basketball (alternatively known as NBA 2K4, and sometimes mislabeled as ESPN NBA Basketball 2K4) is a 2003 basketball simulation video game developed by Visual Concepts and published by Sega. It is the fifth installment in the NBA 2K franchise and the successor to NBA 2K3. It was released in 2003 for PlayStation 2 and Xbox. Allen Iverson is the cover athlete of the game (and is his last cover). ESPN NBA Basketball is the predecessor to ESPN NBA 2K5 in the NBA 2K series. It is the penultimate NBA 2K game before being sold by Sega company to form 2K Sports. It is also the first game to feature the ESPN logo full-time and the only game not to feature "2K" in its title, but instead featured "2K4" on the cover art.

ESPN NBA Basketball simulates the experience of the National Basketball Association, as well as basketball in general, and features a mix of realistic NBA games, and arcade style play. Players play NBA basketball games with real teams, as well as playing street basketball with customizable players. NBA games feature commentary, pregame shows, and other affects. Several improvements to the game were made; new dribbling, dunking, shooting, and passing systems are introduced, while the visuals and sound were also improved. A hip hop focused soundtrack is present. The game features several game modes, such as 24/7, a mode where the player creates their own basketball player and takes on NBA stars, and online multiplayer, which is a first for the series.

ESPN NBA Basketball received a positive reception upon release, with some critics calling it the best basketball game available for the Xbox and PlayStation 2. Positive comments were mostly concerning the game's wealth of content, visuals, and overall gameplay.

== Gameplay ==
ESPN NBA Basketball is a basketball simulation game that simulates the experience of the National Basketball Association, as well as basketball in general, and features a mix of realistic NBA simulations, and arcade style play. The game features several game modes, such as 24/7, a mode where the player creates their own basketball player, and online multiplayer. Players play NBA games with real teams and players, as well as playing street basketball with customizable players. NBA game simulations feature commentary from Bob Fitzgerald (and is the first time to call him by that name instead of Bob Steele) and Tom Tolbert, and pregame shows by Kevin Frazier. The game features online multiplayer for the first time in the NBA 2K series.

Several gameplay improvements and additions were made. The passing game for example has been rebuilt; instead of one type of basic pass, the player can freely choose from basic, behind the back, between the legs, or alley-oop passes. The previous dribbling system has been replaced by IsoMotion, a system that features many animations, allows the player to perform hesitations, in-and-outs, or ankle breakers, and emphasises quick timing and reflexes.

24/7 mode is one of the game's main features. The player creates their basketball player, customizing the physical appearance (facial features, hair, skin colour, accessories, jersey, etc.), and journeys across the United States, competing against other basketball players, including NBA stars, in tournaments or street pickup games. The player completes different challenges in different types of events against their opponent(s). For example, the player's goal in one event could be to get five dunks in a one-on-one game, while in another, the player may be tasked with completing a five-on-five event without getting a shot blocked. The player upgrades their basketball player's abilities and attributes, thus getting better, unlocks different animations, and equips different accessories, as they complete events. The player also improves their "rank", which in turn, unlocks more events or items, and improves the player's reputation, allowing the player to play with certain players and take on bosses.

In addition to the 24/7 mode, online multiplayer, and local multiplayer game modes, the game features other modes, such as quick play. The player may play playoff games, play through a full NBA regular season, practice in an empty arena, play street basketball games, which are considerably different to regular NBA games, as well as manage a team in the franchise mode, where players can fire coaches and other personnel, trade players, and play through the NBA.

== Development ==
Allen Iverson is the cover athlete of the game. This is the final time he appeared on an NBA 2K cover; Iverson appeared on the cover of the first five games in the NBA 2K series.

Unlike past games in the NBA 2K series, every NBA player in the game features a unique facial design, giving the game more realism.

== Release ==
The game was released worldwide in 2003 for PlayStation 2 and Xbox. ESPN NBA Basketball is the only game in the NBA 2K series not to feature "2K" in the title, but instead featured "2K4" on the cover art. It is also one of two games in the series (the other being ESPN NBA 2K5) to have "ESPN" in the title and featured in the game itself.

== Reception ==
Reception

Aggregate score
| Aggregator | Score | |
| Aggregator | PS2 | Xbox |
|---|---|---|
| Metacritic | 89/100 | 87/100 |

Review scores
| Publication | Score | |
| Publication | PS2 | Xbox |
|---|---|---|
| Electronic Gaming Monthly | 9/10 (Note: Three critics of Electronic Gaming Monthly gave the game each a score of 8.5/10, 9.5/10, and 9/10.) | 9/10 |
| Game Informer | 9.5/10 | 9.5/10 |
| GameRevolution | B+ | B+ |
| GameSpot | 8.9/10 | 8.9/10 |
| GameSpy | 4/5 | 4/5 |
| GameZone | 9.5/10 | 9.5/10 |
| IGN | 9.2/10 | 9.2/10 |
| Official U.S. PlayStation Magazine | 5/5 | N/A |
| Official Xbox Magazine (US) | N/A | 9/10 |
| X-Play | 4/5 | N/A |
| BBC Sport | 82% | N/A |

ESPN NBA Basketball received "favorable" reviews on both platforms according to the review aggregation website Metacritic.

GameRevolution's review cited the graphics, game modes, and online features as positives, and the unpolished mechanics of rebounding and isolation play as negatives. The review concluded, "With its excellent graphics and myriad game modes, ESPN NBA Basketball is a good, strong title. The gameplay quirks like rebounding difficulty and the canned animations are there and can be frustrating, but are easily overlooked when you take in the big picture. It holds its own in the paint." IGN's Jon Robinson said: "Sure, the addition of a pro hop button and the separation of the shoot and dunk buttons would make the game all the better, but even without those features, ESPN NBA Basketball is still overall the best playing basketball game this season. For the first time, basketball fans have an excuse to be playing a game at four in the morning. It's 24/7, the life of a baller. Forget Jon Robinson. The life of Jrob Andsteal has now begun. See you on the courts." Giancarlo Varanini of Official U.S. PlayStation Magazine praised the gameplay, calling it "nearly flawless", the "top-notch" commentary, the 24/7 mode, which was commended for its addictiveness, and the visuals. Varanini had minor complaints about certain gameplay aspects, mostly the controllability while on a fast break. He concluded, "There's just so much to like about ESPN NBA Basketball that any basketball fan--casual or hardcore--would be deemed insane for even considering passing it up." Bob Colayco of GameSpot said: "While there are a small handful of faults with the game, ESPN NBA Basketball has just about everything a hardcore NBA fan could ask for. It includes a tough, but rewarding, simulation-style of gameplay, a feature-packed franchise mode, street-style game modes, and the truly unique 24/7 gameplay mode that might be good enough to be its own game. If you're a hardcore NBA fan with an Xbox or PlayStation 2, your game library just isn't complete without a copy of ESPN NBA Basketball." GamePro said that the game "retains the top slot by just a hair." (Note: GamePro gave the game two 4.5/5 scores for graphics and sound, and two 5/5 scores for control and fun factor.)
