= Insignia (Xbox) =

Alternative server for online play for the Xbox console

- Logo as seen on Insignia's webpage

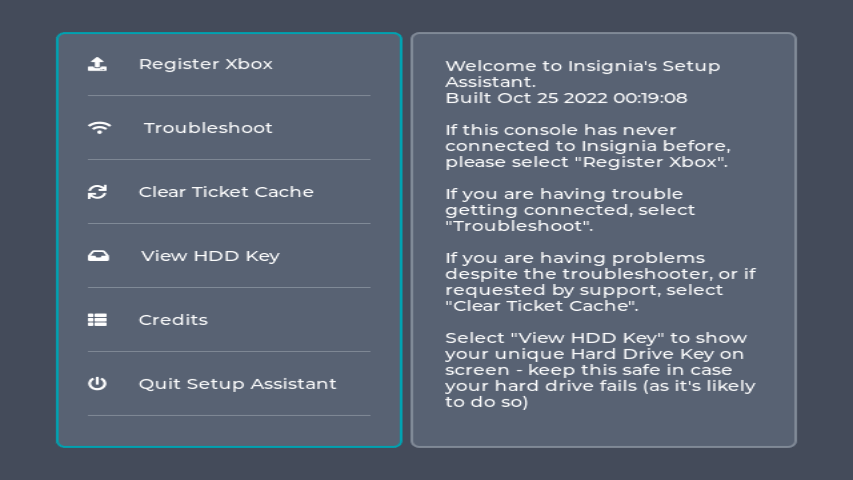
- Insignia's registration application used to register a Xbox, emulated or physical, to Insignia's servers
- Release: July 2022 (Private Alpha); November 2022 (Public Beta)
- Platform: Microsoft Xbox
- Predecessor: Xbox Live
- Website: https://insignia.live

Insignia is a free, non-commercial server that has restored the functionality of Xbox Live for the original Xbox. Insignia was created via closed-source reverse engineering of the original Live server software, hosted on Insignia's own servers, and its aim is to support every game that had Xbox Live support. Insignia is currently in public beta. Some games are either not supported yet or are supported on a limited basis.

Insignia can work on both unmodified and modified Xboxes, as well as Xbox emulators such as Xemu. To play online, a console has to be registered to Insignia's servers via the registration tool which can be done on unmodified consoles with the one-time "endgame" exploit that is run via USB. On modified Xboxes, the registration tool can be copied across to the hard drive or burned to disc.

Once registered the user can create an Xbox Live account similar to how it would have originally been done. Insignia is completely free-of-charge and has no monthly fee. Insignia requires an email to register an account. Insignia is working on the ability to play backwards compatible original Xbox games online on the Xbox 360.

Insignia currently supports most features that worked on Xbox Live, such as matchmaking, leaderboards, friends support, game invites, clans, user generated content, voice chat along with game updates and DLC downloads for some games.

As of November 2026, Insignia has over 36,000 users registered and supports 216 of 381 games that use Xbox Live features.

== History ==
Insignia was started in 2019 by two developers, Luke Usher and Billy, who decided to work together trying to make an Xbox Live replacement as the original Xbox Live servers had shut down in April 2010. Billy worked previously on replacement services for the Wii U and 3DS, and Luke was the lead developer of an open source Xbox emulator, called Cxbx-Reloaded. Insignia was publicly announced in May 2020 and was planned to go live later that year. In July 2022, a closed alpha test was started. Insignia went into an open beta that November and supported 25 games at release; public signups had been open for one month before the beta.

By November 2022, around 7,000 people has signed up for the waiting list, and by December, 3,500 people were approved and 40 games were supported. By November 2023, it had reached up to 150 games and over 8,000 users. and by December 2024, there were over 20,000 registered users

Multiplayer servers for Halo 2 were launched in March 2024. Certain Affinity founder and Halo 2 map designer Max Hoberman was positive to its launch.

In September 2025, the Insignia team announced that they have eventual plans to bring online functionality of Xbox games on the Xbox 360 at a later date and that support for some EA titles are close to being supported online.

In August 2026, Luke Usher announced a restoration of the services for Final Fantasy XI on the PlayStation 2 via Insignia's custom PlayOnline infrastructure.

On October 3rd 2026, Insignia officially announced their 200th game and 1st EA title on the service to be Burnout 3: Takedown.

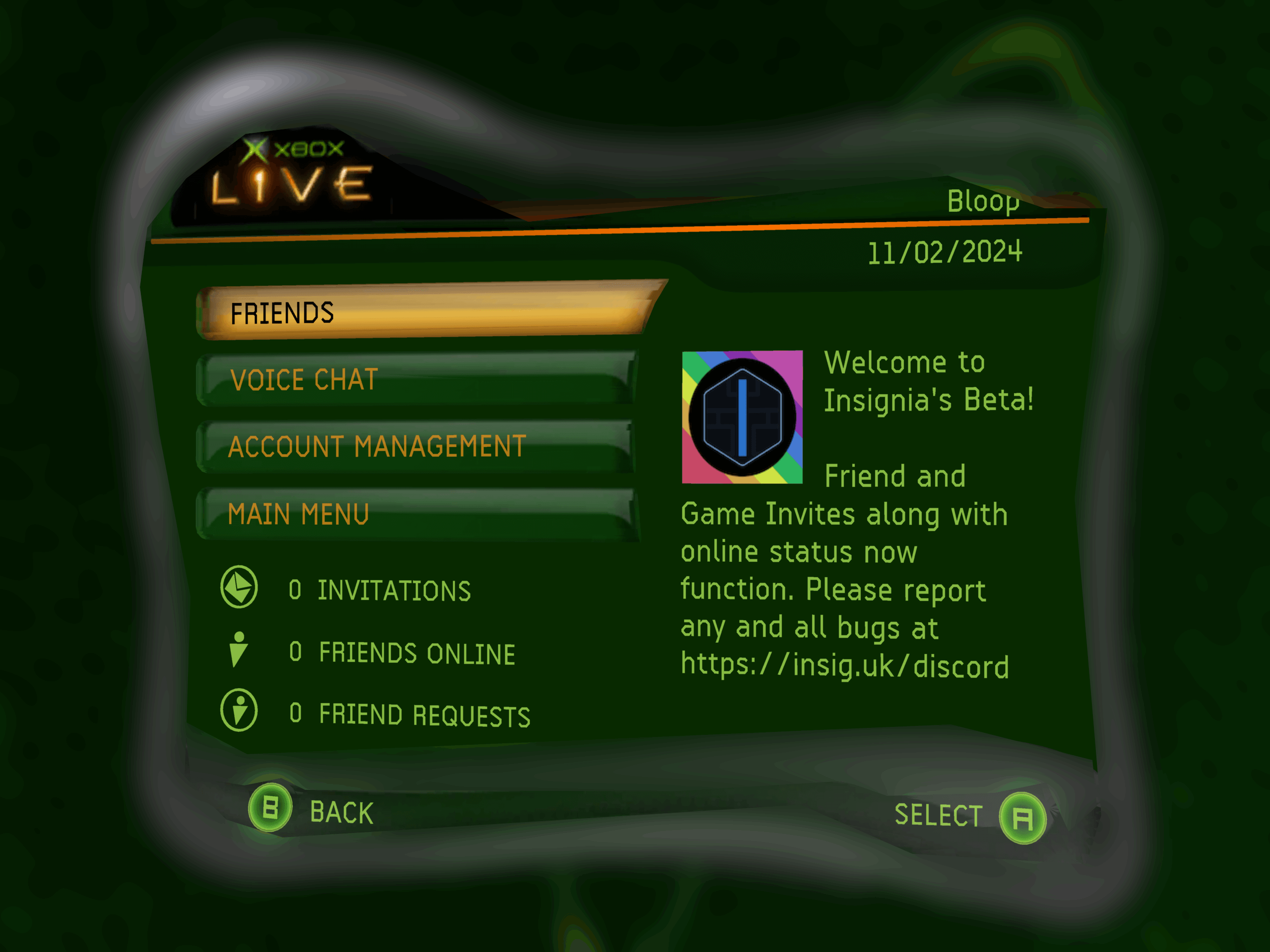
Shows a user signed into the Insignia server on the message of the day page
