= NBA 2K3 =

2002 basketball video game

- Xbox cover art featuring Allen Iverson
- Developer: Visual Concepts
- Publisher: Sega
- Series: NBA 2K
- Platforms: GameCube, PlayStation 2, Xbox
- Release: NA: October 7, 2002
- Genre: Sports
- Modes: Single-player, multiplayer

NBA 2K3 is a 2002 sports video game developed by Visual Concepts and published by Sega for GameCube, PlayStation 2 and Xbox.

== Gameplay ==
NBA 2K3 presents a simulation‑focused style of basketball built around realistic pacing, player behavior, and situational control. The game introduces new mechanics intended to expand on-court options. Players can dive to save balls headed out of bounds by pressing the jump button in specific situations. A double‑crossover mechanic lets ball handlers chain moves to bypass secondary defenders when driving the lane. Post play includes the ability to fight for position by pushing the analog stick up or down, allowing offensive and defensive players to maneuver for better placement before receiving or contesting passes. Passing now includes chest‑high and bounce‑pass variations, activated by pressing the pass button with different levels of pressure.

== Reception ==
Reception

Aggregate score
Aggregator	Score		
Aggregator	GameCube	PS2	Xbox
Metacritic	84/100	89/100	87/100

Review scores
Publication	Score		
Publication	GameCube	PS2	Xbox
Electronic Gaming Monthly	9/10	9/10	9/10
Game Informer	N/A	9.25/10	N/A
GamePro	5/5	5/5	5/5
GameRevolution	N/A	A−	A−
GameSpot	8.1/10	8.3/10	8.4/10
GameSpy	N/A	N/A	4/5
GameZone	8.7/10	8.9/10	8.9/10
IGN	8.7/10	8.7/10	8.9/10
Nintendo Power	4.2/5	N/A	N/A
Official U.S. PlayStation Magazine	N/A	5/5	N/A
Official Xbox Magazine (US)	N/A	N/A	8.7/10

The game received "favorable" reviews on all platforms according to video game review aggregator Metacritic. It was nominated for GameSpot's annual "Best Traditional Sports Game on GameCube" award, but lost to NFL 2K3.
