= List of Cabela's video games =

This is a list of hunting video games developed in conjunction with Cabela's for a variety of gaming platforms.

== Big Game Hunter series ==
- Cabela's Big Game Hunter (1998)
- Cabela's Big Game Hunter II (1998)
- Cabela's Big Game Hunter III (1999)
- Cabela's Big Game Hunter 4 (2000)
- Cabela's Big Game Hunter 5: Platinum Series (2001)
- Cabela's Big Game Hunter: Ultimate Challenge (2001)
- Cabela's Big Game Hunter 6 (2002)
- Cabela's Big Game Hunter: 2004 Season (2003)
- Cabela's Big Game Hunter 2005 Adventures (2004)
- Cabela's Big Game Hunter 2006 Trophy Season (2005)
- Cabela's Alaskan Adventures (2006)
- Cabela's Big Game Hunter (2007)
- Cabela's Big Game Hunter 2010 (2009)
- Cabela's Big Game Hunter: Hunting Party (2011)
- Cabela's Big Game Hunter 2012 (2011)
- Cabela's Big Game Hunter: Pro Hunts (2014)

== 4x4 Off-Road series ==
- Cabela's 4x4 Off-Road Adventure (2001)
- Cabela's 4x4 Off-Road Adventure 2 (2001)
- Cabela's 4x4 Off-Road Adventure 3 (2003)

== Ultimate Deer Hunt series ==
- Cabela's Ultimate Deer Hunt (2001)
- Cabela's Ultimate Deer Hunt 2 (2002)
- Cabela's Ultimate Deer Hunt: Open Season (2002)

== Deer Hunt series ==
- Cabela's Deer Hunt: 2004 Season (2003)
- Cabela's Deer Hunt: 2005 Season (2004)

== Dangerous Hunts series ==
- Cabela's Dangerous Hunts (2003)
- Cabela's Dangerous Hunts 2 (2005)
- Cabela's Dangerous Hunts: Ultimate Challenge (2006)
- Cabela's Dangerous Hunts 2009 (2008)
- Cabela's Dangerous Hunts 2011 (2010)
- Cabela's Dangerous Hunts 2013 (2012)

== GrandSlam Hunting series ==
- Cabela's GrandSlam Hunting: North American 29 (2000)
- Cabela's GrandSlam Hunting: 2004 Trophies (2003)

== Outdoor Adventures series ==
- Cabela's Outdoor Adventures (2005)
- Cabela's Outdoor Adventures (2009)

== Others ==
- Cabela's Sportsman's Challenge (1999)
- Cabela's Outdoor Trivia Challenge (1999)
- Cabela's Alaskan Adventures (2006)
- Cabela's African Safari (2006)
- Cabela's Monster Bass (2007)
- Cabela’s Trophy Bucks (2007)
- Cabela's Legendary Adventures (2008)
- Cabela's Monster Buck Hunter (2010)
- Cabela's North American Adventures (2010)
- Cabela's Adventure Camp (2011)
- Cabela's Survival: Shadows of Katmai (2011)
- Cabela’s Hunting Expeditions (2012)
- Cabela's African Adventures (2013)
- Cabela's: The Hunt - Championship Edition (2018)

== See also ==
- Deer Hunter (series)
