= List of Xbox games compatible with Xbox 360 =

The Xbox 360 gaming console received updates from Microsoft from its launch in 2005 until November 2007 that enabled it to play select games from its predecessor, Xbox. The Xbox 360 launched with backward compatibility with the number of supported Xbox games varying depending on region. Microsoft continued to update the list of Xbox games that were compatible with Xbox 360 until November 2007 when the list was finalized. Microsoft later launched the Xbox Originals program on December 7, 2007, where select backward compatible Xbox games could be purchased digitally on Xbox 360 consoles with the program ending less than two years later in June 2009. The following is a list of all backward compatible games on Xbox 360 under this functionality.

== History ==
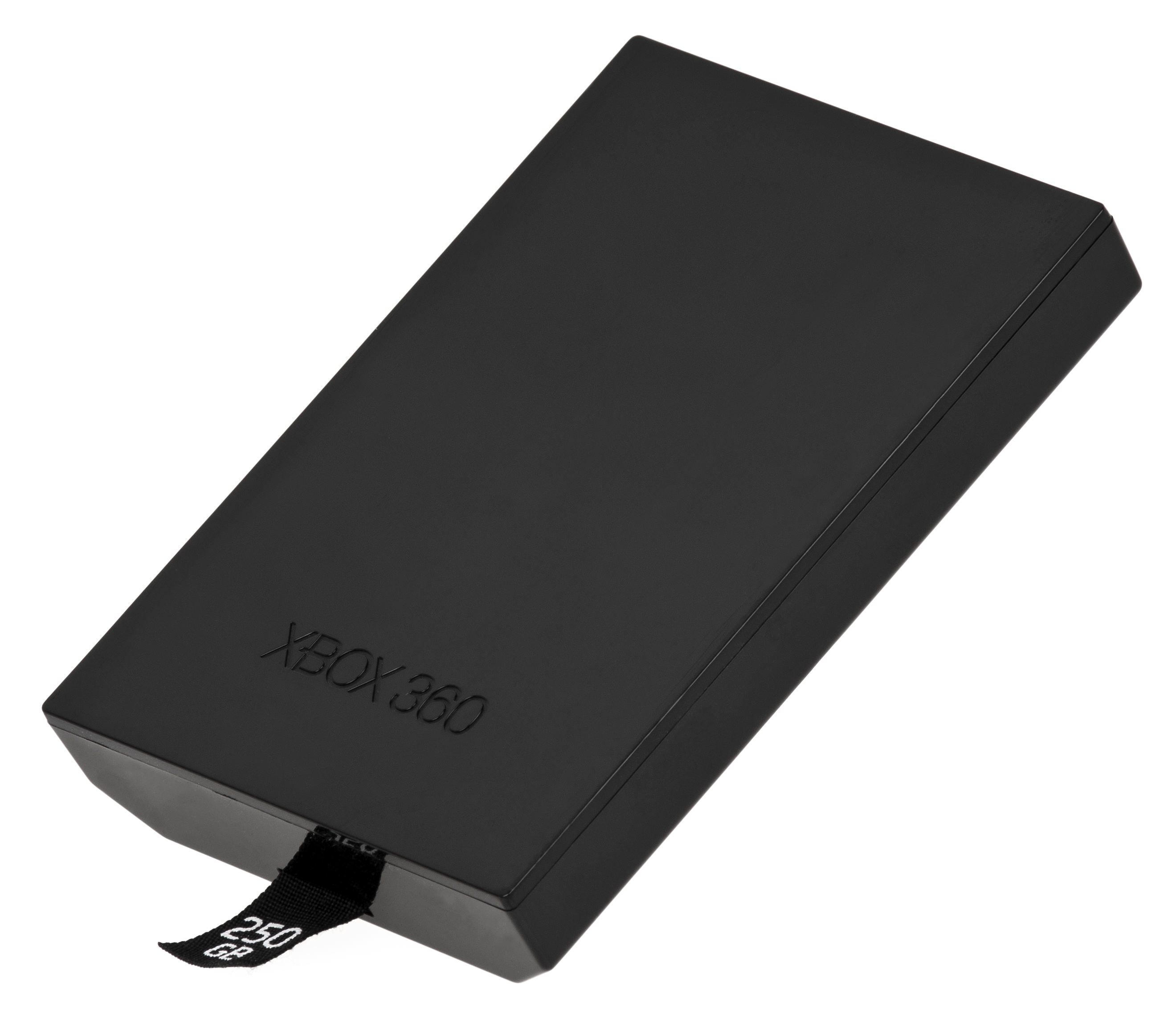
A hard drive with "partition 2" is required to play emulated Xbox games.

At its launch in November 2005, the Xbox 360 did not possess hardware-based backward compatibility with Xbox games due to the different types of hardware and architecture used in the Xbox and Xbox 360. Instead backward compatibility was achieved using software emulation. When the Xbox 360 launched in North America 212 Xbox games were supported while in Europe 156 games were supported. The Japanese market had the fewest titles supported at launch with only 12 games. Microsoft's final update to the list of backward compatible titles was in November 2007 bringing the final total to 466 Xbox games.

In order to use the backwards compatibility feature on Xbox 360 a hard drive is required. Updates to the list were provided from Microsoft as part of regular software updates via the Internet, ordering a disc by mail from the official website or downloading the update from the official website then burning it to either a CD or DVD. Subscribers to Official Xbox Magazine would also have updates to the backwards compatibility list on the demo discs included with the magazine.

Supported original Xbox games will run each with an emulation profile that has been recompiled for each game with the emulation profiles stored on the console's hard drive. Original Xbox games must use the original game disc and can not be installed to the hard drive unlike Xbox 360 games. Game saves and downloadable content cannot be transferred from an original Xbox to an Xbox 360. Xbox Live functionality for original Xbox games was available until April 15, 2010, when online support for original Xbox games were discontinued. System link functionality between original Xbox and Xbox 360 remains available. Despite the termination of Xbox Live support for original Xbox games, Insignia, a revival server that has restored online functionality to original Xbox games has announced in September 2025 that backwards compatible original titles will eventually be supported online on the 360.

Microsoft launched the Xbox Originals program in December 2007 where Xbox 360 owners could purchase select original Xbox titles digitally if they did not own a game disc and such could be found inside their own section in the Xbox Live Marketplace. Beginning in June 2009 the branding was phased out and the games were moved to the "Games on Demand" section of the store with Microsoft stating that they have "finished its portfolio" of Xbox Originals.

During Microsoft's E3 2017 press conference on June 11, 2017, backward compatibility for original Xbox games on Xbox One family of consoles was announced. Part of the backward compatibility program for Xbox One will see original Xbox games be made available digitally in addition to owners of the original Xbox game disc. Prior to the first batch of original Xbox backward compatible titles for Xbox One were revealed six titles that were never released digitally as part of Xbox Originals program for Xbox 360 appeared in its "Games on Demand" store. Microsoft also confirmed that digital licenses would also carry over to Xbox One.

Game saves for original Xbox games that are backward compatible on both Xbox 360 and Xbox One cannot be transferred between the three generations. While Xbox Live functionality will not be available, Albert Penello, head of marketing for Xbox, explained users could "system link an original Xbox, an Xbox 360, an Xbox One and an Xbox One X for a four-player system-link LAN play with all original discs across three generations of consoles."

== List of compatible Xbox games ==
There are 466 games made backward compatible out of 989 that were released for Xbox.

XO Xbox Originals	XBO Xbox One Forward Compatible	NA North America only PAL PAL only J Japan only

Title	Publisher(s)	Technical issue(s)	Add-Ons	Region(s)	Ref(s)
2006 FIFA World Cup	EA Sports	Sometimes the text on menu options and buttons are replaced by text from a similar object on the same screen.			
25 to Life	Eidos	Random crashes would occur when attempting to start an online match.		NA	
4x4 Evo 2	Gathering of Developers	Black screen when running in 480p/720p/1080i/1080p 60 Hz display settings			
Airforce Delta Storm; Deadly Skies (PAL); Airforce Delta II (JP)	Konami				
Aggressive Inline	AKA Acclaim	Intro sequence is choppy.			
Alias	Acclaim Entertainment				
Aliens Versus Predator: Extinction	EA Games				
All-Star Baseball 2003	Acclaim Sports				
All-Star Baseball 2005	Acclaim Entertainment				
America's Army: Rise of a Soldier	Ubisoft				
AMF Bowling 2004	Mud Duck Productions			NA	
Amped: Freestyle Snowboarding; Tenku: Freestyle Snowboarding (JP)	Microsoft Game Studios				
Amped 2 Tenku 2 (JP)	Microsoft Game Studios	There is flickering geometry during some levels. On occasion a sound effect will play repeatedly.			
APEX; Racing Evoluzione (PAL)	Infogrames	During the dream mode cutscene there is missing audio dialogue.			
Aquaman: Battle for Atlantis	TDK Mediactive			NA	
Arena Football	EA Sports	Minor audio static can be heard during gameplay.			
Armed and Dangerous	LucasArts	After the first level voice audio doesn't play during game cinematics. During the opening cinematic some audio and video choppiness are present.	XBO		
Army Men: Sarge's War	3DO				
Atari Anthology	Atari				
ATV: Quad Power Racing 2	AKA Acclaim				
Auto Modellista	Capcom				
Avatar: The Last Airbender	THQ				
Bad Boys: Miami Takedown; Bad Boys II (PAL)	Empire Interactive	PAL edition is not backwards compatible			
Baldur's Gate: Dark Alliance	Interplay Entertainment	In the second zone during combat scenes there is a thirty to forty frames per second drop in performance.		NA	
Baldur's Gate: Dark Alliance II	Interplay Entertainment				
Barbie Horse Adventures: Wild Horse Rescue	Vivendi Universal Games	The bottom half of the screen is not drawn correctly in split-screen mode.			
The Bard's Tale	Vivendi Universal Games				
Bass Pro Shops Trophy Hunter 2007	Vivendi Universal Games	The aiming reticule is surrounded by a box while the snowmobile suffers from a partial lack of collision.			
Batman Begins	EA Games				
Batman: Rise of Sin Tzu	Ubi Soft				
Battle Engine Aquila	Infogrames				
Battlestar Galactica	Vivendi Universal Games				
Big Bumpin'	King Games	Game includes Original Xbox and Xbox 360 versions on a single disc.		NA	
Big Mutha Truckers	THQ				
Bionicle	Electronic Arts, Lego Interactive				
Black	Electronic Arts		XO XBO		
Black Stone: Magic & Steel; Ex-Chaser (JP)	Xicat Interactive	Graphics for Y button do not display correctly in Controller Settings.			
Blade II	Activision	There is a slight pause when reaching a save point.			
Blinx: The Time Sweeper	Microsoft Game Studios	This title consistently experiences slowdown.	XBO		
Blinx 2: Masters of Time and Space	Microsoft Game Studios	This title experiences consistent performance problems.			
Blitz: The League	Midway Games			NA	
Blood Omen 2	Eidos	Characters may spin in different directions randomly during cut scenes. When gaining a new ability graphical effects do not display correctly.			
BloodRayne 2	Majesco	After reloading the checkpoint a noticeable loss in frame rate is present.	XBO		
BlowOut	Majesco		XO		
BMX XXX	AKA Acclaim				
Breakdown	Namco	During gameplay system hangs on occasion while light sources show through walls.	XBO		
Breeders' Cup World Thoroughbred Championships (Note: Microsoft has this game listed under the title NTRA Breeders' Cup World Thoroughbred Championships.)	Bethesda	Video in the Start menu skips.		NA	
Brute Force	Microsoft Game Studios				
Buffy the Vampire Slayer	Electronic Arts	When viewing the opening logos and cinematic it will not display properly.			
Buffy the Vampire Slayer: Chaos Bleeds	Vivendi Universal Games				
Burger King games	King Games	See Big Bumpin', PocketBike Racer, and Sneak King entries.		NA	
Burnout	Acclaim Entertainment	Random sounds may repeat during while racing on the first track. During the "USA Marathon" track performance drops.			
Burnout 2: Point of Impact	Acclaim Entertainment	Pressing Start on attract mode will cause the game to boot back instantly. When playing split-screen races and on tracks with snow and rain effects performance slows down.			
Burnout 3: Takedown	Electronic Arts	There is noticeable slowdown in the "Winter City" track when driving through the market.	XO	NA PAL	
Cabela's Big Game Hunter 2005 Adventures	Activision				
Cabela's Dangerous Hunts	Activision				
Cabela's Dangerous Hunts 2	Activision				
Cabela's Outdoor Adventures	Activision				
Cabela's Deer Hunt: 2004 Season	Activision				
Cabela's Deer Hunt: 2005 Season	Activision				
Call of Cthulhu: Dark Corners of the Earth	Bethesda Softworks, 2K Games	During the prologue stage a green dot appears and will remain on screen while walking down the last set of stairs.			
Call of Duty: Finest Hour	Activision	Prone to potentially game breaking freezing late in the Soviet campaign, very occasional minor texture flickering.			
Call of Duty 2: Big Red One	Activision	When playing multiplayer, dots representing the enemy do not appear in the HUD.			
Call of Duty 3	Activision				
Cars	THQ	When viewing cut scenes pixel color alteration will occur. In very rare cases, the game may crash while driving around.			
Catwoman	EA Games				
Championship Manager 2006	Eidos	This game was only released in Europe, however this title is included on Microsoft's official backwards compatible list for North America.		NA	
Chicago Enforcer	Kemco				
The Chronicles of Narnia: The Lion, The Witch and The Wardrobe	Buena Vista Games				
Circus Maximus: Chariot Wars	Encore				
Close Combat: First to Fight	2K Games				
Colin McRae Rally 04	Codemasters	Frametiming (fluidity) issues during racing. Slowdown during corners on some tracks. Race timer is unaffected, leading to overall increased difficulty. Playing in bumper camera resolves this. Letters and characters such as in text and menus have graphical artifacts.			
Colin McRae Rally 2005	Codemasters	While on the main menu there is some texture flickering in the background image. Before the start of a race graphical artifacts appear on text on screen. During single and multiplayer races there are severe fluidity issues, inconstant frame rate and screen tearing.			
Combat Elite: WWII Paratroopers	SouthPeak Interactive				
Commandos 2: Men of Courage	Eidos				
Conflict: Desert Storm	SCi				
Conker: Live & Reloaded	Microsoft Game Studios	Loading screens will not appear, occasional system hangs during gameplay and local multiplayer. Effects such as dust and smoke will not render correctly. The game crashes when entering the Dung Beetle dungeon.	XBO		
Constantine	THQ				
Counter-Strike	Microsoft Game Studios	When playing in VGA/HD video mode performance drops occur during single player mode high bot matches.			
Crash Bandicoot: The Wrath of Cortex	Vivendi Games		XO	NA PAL	
Crash Nitro Kart	Vivendi Universal Games	Runs at 30 fps in 720p in 480p the game runs at 60fps.		NA PAL	
Crash Twinsanity	Vivendi Universal Games	Certain sections may experience slowdown and frame rate issues. Audio may desync in cutscenes, and minor crackling can sometimes be heard.			
Crime Life: Gang Wars	Konami	Random cut scenes display a static image while audio plays normally. There is an occasional crash during the loading screen.			
Crimson Skies: High Road to Revenge	Microsoft Game Studios		XO XBO		
Crouching Tiger, Hidden Dragon	Ubi Soft				
The Da Vinci Code	2K Games	There are some environments that are transparent. There is some skipping during the cut scenes.			
Dai Senryaku VII: Modern Military Tactics; Daisenryaku VII (JP)	Kemco	After the opening logos, a dirty disc error is occasionally displayed.			
Dark Angel	Vivendi Universal Games				
Darkwatch	Capcom	The "Invasion" mission is unplayable – trying to start it causes the game to either freeze or exit to the main interface showing an error message, making it impossible to proceed with the story. The intro sequence is choppy and skipping it makes the game freeze after pressing the Start button at the title screen.			
Dave Mirra Freestyle BMX 2	Acclaim Max Sports	The sky is corrupted in the Attract Mode. There is also a random performance drop during gameplay.			
Dead or Alive 3	Tecmo		XBO		
Dead or Alive Ultimate	Tecmo	A random crash may occur before starting the opening movie. Slowdowns during certain stages.	XBO		
Dead to Rights	Namco	Flickering during third helicopter fight on mission #6. Temporary performance drops on stage #7.	XBO		
Deathrow	Ubi Soft				
Destroy All Humans!	THQ	The weapon sounds cut out during periods of high activity.	XO XBO		
Digimon Rumble Arena 2	Bandai	Issue only present in the Japanese version, save data title is shown in English.			
Dinotopia: The Sunstone Odyssey	TDK Mediactive	Game subtitles and background font are showing poorly. When in mission #1 player attack on training dummy frame-rate drops during attacking.		NA PAL	
Doom 3	Activision				
Doom 3: Resurrection of Evil	Activision	First time running the game, you need to wait until the main menu loads. Attempting to skip will cause a minor graphical glitch after the "Please Wait" message goes away. Doom Classic: Wrong SFX on item pickup			
Drake of the 99 Dragons	Majesco			NA	
Dreamfall: The Longest Journey	Aspyr Media		XO		
Drive to Survive; Mashed: Fully Loaded (PAL)	Empire Interactive	A short pause in gameplay will occur when taunting.			
Dungeons & Dragons: Heroes	Atari				
Dynasty Warriors 4 Shin Sangokumusou 3 (JP)	Koei	Game progress may not save correctly. Severe frame rate drops when many characters are on-screen. Minor visual artifacts on some menus.			
Egg Mania: Eggstreme Madness	Kemco				
The Elder Scrolls III: Morrowind	Bethesda Softworks	The load game screenshots will fail to render correctly. Furthermore, some areas will cause the frame rate to be very low as well as loading screens being significantly longer compared to the Xbox	XBO		
ESPN College Hoops	Sega				
ESPN College Hoops 2K5	Sega	During the intro video, there is some choppiness.		NA	
ESPN Major League Baseball	Sega	Controller sometimes fails to vibrate outside of the strike zone, logos on player uniforms sometimes flicker and occasional choppy animations when video mode is set to 1080i.			
ESPN MLS ExtraTime 2002	Konami				
ESPN NFL 2K5	Sega				
ESPN NHL 2K5	Sega	There are texture issues throughout the gameplay and gameplay splash screens.			
Evil Dead: A Fistful of Boomstick	THQ				
Evil Dead: Regeneration	THQ	Some in-game light sources engulf large portions of the screen. There is some random crashing.			
F1 2001	EA Sports				
Fable	Microsoft Game Studios	Occasionally there is an audio "scratch" or static popping sound.	XO		
Fable: The Lost Chapters	Microsoft Game Studios				
The Fairly OddParents: Breakin' da Rules	THQ				
Family Guy Video Game!	2K Games				
Fantastic Four	Activision	There is a random crash during the first full-motion video.			
Far Cry Instincts	Ubisoft	During three-person split-screen, there is graphic distortion and loss of control. There are jagged horizontal lines in the attract mode on 480p/720p displays. Frame rate drops during the second mission, and there are visible texture seams while riding the zipline in the mines. When using a melee attack after transformation, the knife audio effect plays. The checkpoints do not save when running in PAL-50.			
Fatal Frame; Project Zero (PAL)	Tecmo, Microsoft Game Studios	The PAL version "Project Zero" is not supported. Missing video during a ghost introduction cutscene in the mansion. Some alpha textures on the main character's hair are broken.			
Fatal Frame II: Crimson Butterfly; Project Zero II: Crimson Butterfly (PAL)	Tecmo				
FIFA Football 2003	EA Sports				
FIFA Football 2004	EA Sports				
FIFA 06	EA Sports	The in-game cut scenes are blurry as well as the penalty shootouts.			
FIFA 07	EA Sports	The frame rate drops on the opening video, and the in-game cut scenes are blurry.			
FIFA Street	EA Sports BIG				
FIFA Street 2	EA Sports BIG				
Fight Night 2004	EA Sports	Has on some hairstyles problems, to display. And something it has slowdowns.			
Fight Night Round 3	EA Sports				
Final Fight: Streetwise	Capcom	The audio and video are not synced in the cut scenes while there is minor flickering in the cinematics. There is a performance slowdown during gameplay when there is a significant number of objects on screen, and the floor texture is missing in the Pier 15 area of Chapter 3.			
FlatOut	Empire Interactive				
Ford Mustang: The Legend Lives	2K Games				
Ford vs. Chevy	Global Star Software				
Forgotten Realms: Demon Stone	Atari	In Chapter 4, there is a texture dropout in the cut scene. In Chapters 4 and 5, the unlockable concept art videos do not play. There is a small vertical dotted line distortion on the right side of the heads-up display.			
Forza Motorsport	Microsoft Game Studios	Frame rate is lower and unstable if compared to the original experience. There are some artifacts in the decals menu. Occasionally, you can hear audio noises. The loading animation does not appear, except for when high scores are being saved.			
Freaky Flyers	Midway Games	The frame rate occasionally drops during the game, changing the resolution to 480p yields moderate improvements.			
Freedom Fighters	EA Games			NA	
Freestyle Street Soccer; Urban Freestyle Soccer (PAL)	Acclaim Entertainment				
Frogger Beyond	Konami				
Frogger: Ancient Shadow	Konami				
Full Spectrum Warrior	THQ		XBO		
Full Spectrum Warrior: Ten Hammers	THQ	There is some improper aliasing on player models and environment.			
Futurama	SCi Games, Vivendi Universal Games				
Future Tactics: The Uprising	JoWooD Productions, Crave Entertainment				
Fuzion Frenzy	Microsoft Game Studios		XO XBO		
Gauntlet: Seven Sorrows	Midway Games		XO		
Genma Onimusha	Capcom				
Goblin Commander: Unleash the Horde	Jaleco Entertainment				
Godzilla: Destroy All Monsters Melee	Infogrames				
Godzilla: Save the Earth	Atari				
GoldenEye: Rogue Agent	EA Games				
Grabbed by the Ghoulies	Microsoft Game Studios	Video output is too narrow on VGA with 1280x1024 resolution. This can be remedied by selecting a different output resolution. There is a chance of save data corruption when the game is booted up. Lightbulbs may show a checkerboard pattern instead of light effect.	XO XBO		
Grand Theft Auto III	Rockstar Games	There is some chugging during the intro. Major frame rate slowdown while driving. Radio is quiet during gameplay.			(Note: Grand Theft Auto III was announced as a backwards compatible title on November 11, 2005 but is not included on the official list from Microsoft. The game is part of the compilation Grand Theft Auto: The Trilogy which is included on the list. In a comparison of the PlayStation 2 and Xbox versions of Grand Theft Auto III in 2011 the backward compatibility feature of the PlayStation 3 and Xbox 360 was used for the comparison.)
Grand Theft Auto: Double Pack	Rockstar Games	See GTA 3 and Vice City entries.			
Grand Theft Auto: San Andreas	Rockstar Games	Audio sometimes cuts out randomly during cutscenes, or sometimes audio lag. Vehicle explosions would cause it to flicker. Most notably the fire trucks.	XO		
Grand Theft Auto: Vice City	Rockstar Games	There is some chugging during the intro. Major frame rate slowdown while driving. Radio is quiet during gameplay.			
Grand Theft Auto: The Trilogy	Rockstar Games	See GTA 3, Vice City, and San Andreas entries.			
Gravity Games Bike: Street Vert Dirt	Midway Games	Only works in 480p.			
The Great Escape	Gotham Games				
Greg Hastings Tournament Paintball MAX'D	Activision	During system link and online gameplay, players may be randomly teleported.			
Grooverider: Slot Car Thunder	Encore				
Guilty Gear Isuka	Sammy				
Guilty Gear X2 #Reload	Majesco		XO		
The Guy Game	Gathering	There is audio choppiness in videos under the bonus unlockables, and on the extra videos at the end of an episode.		NA	
Half-Life 2	Valve	This game does not play on PAL-60 televisions with composite cabling. This does not affect PAL-50 televisions. Screen corruption in attract mode will occur after the console has been idle for a long period of time.			
Halo: Combat Evolved	Microsoft Game Studios	Major frame rate slowdown when encountering multiple enemies in campaign missions.			
Halo 2	Microsoft Game Studios	Performance problems while playing on the Backwash map. Occasionally the player may observe "ghost" images displayed on the screen. Playing the Gravemind stage in Campaign displays ghost images as well. According to Microsoft, the workaround for this issue is to return to the Dashboard and restart the game.			
Halo 2 Multiplayer Map Pack	Microsoft Game Studios				
Harry Potter and the Chamber of Secrets	EA Games	Certain objects have no graphics while there is a frames-per-second issue.			
Harry Potter and the Goblet of Fire	Electronic Arts				
Harry Potter and the Prisoner of Azkaban	EA Games	An occasional hard lock occurs when switching to cut scenes. Occasionally, enemies will become stuck in a loop or just stuck to the environment.			
Harry Potter and the Sorcerer's Stone; Harry Potter and the Philosopher's Stone (PAL)	EA Games				
He-Man: Defender of Grayskull	Midas Interactive Entertainment	An Xbox version was planned but never released, however this title is included on Microsoft's official backwards compatible list.		Unreleased	
High Heat Major League Baseball 2004	3DO			NA	
High Rollers Casino (Note: Microsoft has this game listed under the title Casino for some unknown reason.)	Mud Duck Productions				
Hitman: Contracts	Eidos				
Hot Wheels: Stunt Track Challenge	THQ				
The House of the Dead III	Sega	Slowdowns during certain sections of the game. House of the Dead 2 has severe graphical issues and huge slowdowns and sometimes speeds up randomly.			
Hulk	Vivendi Universal Games				
Hunter: The Reckoning	Interplay Entertainment		XBO		
I-Ninja	Namco	The frame rate drops in World 3 Central map.			
IHRA Drag Racing: Sportsman Edition	Bethesda Softworks				
IHRA Professional Drag Racing 2005	Bethesda Softworks				
The Incredible Hulk: Ultimate Destruction	Vivendi Universal Games	Flickering textures, black bars during cinematics sometimes flicker too.			
The Incredibles; Mr. Incredible (JP)	THQ	Textures can sometimes load incorrectly, resulting in objects sometimes having the wrong textures.			
The Incredibles: Rise of the Underminer	THQ				
Indiana Jones and the Emperor's Tomb	LucasArts	Some sound effects are out of sync, and there is a random crash on the last level.	XBO		
Indigo Prophecy; Fahrenheit (PAL)	Atari		XO		
IndyCar Series 2005	Codemasters				
Intellivision Lives!	Crave Entertainment		XO		
Jade Empire	Microsoft Game Studios	The Monk Zeng content from the limited edition became available as of the December 2005 update.	XO XBO		
Jet Set Radio Future	Sega	There is graphical flickering in the main menu. Some particle effects in 99th street cause heavy frame drops as well as unknown frame drops in various other stages (Dogenzaka Hill, Fortified Rezidential Zone).			
Judge Dredd: Dredd vs. Death	Evolved Games	Slowdowns and slightly distracting ground and wall flickering during gameplay.			
Jurassic Park: Operation Genesis	Vivendi Universal Games, Konami				
Justice League Heroes	Eidos	Text still appears when scrolling through the upgrade menu screen. There are performance drops during game play. There are some texture issues.			
Kabuki Warriors	Crave Entertainment				
Kelly Slater's Pro Surfer	Activision				
Kill Switch	Namco				
King Arthur	Konami	Minor video stuttering occurs during the actual movie videos.			
The King of Fighters Neowave	SNK Playmore		XBO		
The King of Fighters 2002 & 2003	SNK Playmore	KOF 2002 shows corrupted sprite frames.			
Kingdom Under Fire: The Crusaders	Microsoft Game Studios	Game hangs when selecting "Create Match" after editing a party.			
The Legend of Spyro: A New Beginning	Vivendi Games		XO		
Lego Star Wars: The Video Game	Eidos				
Lego Star Wars II: The Original Trilogy	LucasArts				
Leisure Suit Larry: Magna Cum Laude	Vivendi Universal Games	Incorrect textures are loaded as the player progresses.			
Lemony Snicket's A Series of Unfortunate Events	Activision				
Links 2004	Microsoft Game Studios				
Loons: The Fight for Fame	Infogrames				
The Lord of the Rings: The Return of the King	EA Games	Slowdown during in game cutscenes. Gameplay is fine.			
The Lord of the Rings: The Third Age	EA Games				
Magatama	Microsoft Game Studios		XO	J	
Magic: The Gathering – Battlegrounds	Atari				
Manhunt	Rockstar Games		XBO		
Marvel Nemesis: Rise of the Imperfects	EA Games				
Marvel vs. Capcom 2: New Age of Heroes	Capcom	There is some severe artifacting on character sprites.			
Mat Hoffman's Pro BMX 2	Activision O2	No widescreen support. Boston level loads with blue textures that obstruct the screen.			
Max Payne	Rockstar Games	The game has some minor slowdown.	XO XBO		
Max Payne 2: The Fall of Max Payne	Rockstar Games		XO XBO		
Maximum Chase	Majesco	Live action cinematics are choppy.			
MechAssault 2: Lone Wolf	Microsoft Game Studios	Audio glitches are a common occurrence, with the game soundtrack often stopping dead after a single track instead of looping as it is supposed to, leaving users playing the game in silence.			
Medal of Honor: European Assault	EA Games				
Medal of Honor: Frontline	EA Games	Framerate drops and microstutters occur at certain areas. For example, the truck sequences in the 'Golden Lion' mission.			
Medal of Honor: Rising Sun	EA Games	Framerate constantly drops, and when you try to save your progress after completing a mission, the game does not save despite saying "saving."			
Mega Man Anniversary Collection	Capcom	In Mega Man 8, there are some graphical glitches where certain sprites, such as Mega Man's running sprite, glitch out and stutter. The videos that are unlockable in the game also stutter badly.			
Mercenaries: Playground of Destruction	LucasArts	The thumbnail map will not render correctly. During the China campaign, there are random system hang-ups that prevent player progress.	XBO		
Metal Arms: Glitch in the System	Vivendi Games	Minor frame drops occur.	XO		
Micro Machines	Infogrames				
Mike Tyson Heavyweight Boxing	Codemasters				
Minority Report: Everybody Runs	Activision				
MLB Slugfest 2003	Midway Games	All resolutions above 480i / 480p show no video. There is text corruption throughout the game in the menu, gameplay, pause, and other screens.			
MLB Slugfest 2004	Midway Games				
MLB Slugfest: Loaded	Midway Games			NA	
Monster Garage	Activision				
Mortal Kombat: Armageddon	Midway Games	The Press Start screen has severe flickering.		NA	
Mortal Kombat: Deception	Midway Games	There is flickering on the title screen.			
MotoGP	THQ				
MotoGP 2	THQ	Engine sound effects play louder than normal setting when at higher speeds. Engine sounds crackle and cut out during races. The option to assign keys to the Right Trigger in the Settings menu is missing. Tutorial videos shake and flash.			
MVP Baseball 2003	EA Sports			NA	
MVP Baseball 2004	EA Sports			NA	
MTV Music Generator 3: This Is the Remix	Codemasters	The game performs at a severely low frame-rate when on the Files menu.			
MTX Mototrax	Activision	The loading progress bar is missing.			
Murakumo: Renegade Mech Pursuit	Ubi Soft				
MX Unleashed	THQ	The shadows flicker when leaving the starting gate. Loading screens have a silver box behind the text. Distant trees flicker in and out on the Montauk Plains Freestyle stage.	XBO		
MX vs. ATV Unleashed	THQ	When entering or leaving a race, graphics are polarized. There is object rendering difficulty on the horizon during a waypoint race. Shadows flicker in the THQ SX championship on the Tucson track.			
MX World Tour Featuring Jamie Little	Crave Entertainment				
Myst III: Exile	Ubi Soft				
Namco Museum	Namco	Dig Dug has player port problems player 2 controls player 1 while player controls nothing			
Namco Museum 50th Anniversary Arcade Collection	Namco				
NASCAR 06: Total Team Control	EA Sports				
NASCAR Thunder 2002	EA Sports	There is audio static throughout the game, and the performance drops when the rear view mirror is enabled.		NA	
NASCAR Thunder 2003	EA Sports	Framerate is sluggish, and there is also audio static throughout the game. The audio effects are loud when in the in-car view, and there is some flickering in the Pause menu.		NA	
NBA Ballers	Midway Games				
NBA Inside Drive 2002	Microsoft Game Studios				
NBA 2K3	Sega			NA	
NBA Live 2002	EA Sports				
NBA Live 2004	EA Sports				
NBA Street V3	EA Sports BIG	There is audio stuttering in the introductory video.			
NCAA College Basketball 2K3	Sega				
NCAA Football 06	EA Sports	Player speed while sprinting is very slow. During gameplay there is some audio static.			
NCAA March Madness 06	EA Sports	Performance problems occur during the intro video. There is some audio stutter during the game setup, and minor audio static occurs during gameplay.		NA	
NCAA March Madness 2005	EA Sports	Video stutters during the introductory video.		NA	
Need for Speed: Underground 2	EA Games	Cutscenes stutter and lag. 2-Player Split-screen camera breaks for Player 2 and shows more of Player 1's camera, rendering split-screen play unplayable. Crashes when trying to load a race in the Burnout 3: Takedown in-game demo.			
NFL 2K2	Sega			NA	
NFL 2K3	Sega			NA	
NFL Blitz 2002	Midway Games				
NFL Blitz 2003	Midway Games				
NFL Blitz Pro	Midway Games				
NFL Fever 2004	Microsoft Game Studios				
NHL 2004	EA Sports	Menus flicker, crowd flickering, audio repeats itself sometimes.			
NHL 2005	EA Sports	Audio and video are out of sync in the introductory cinematic.			
NHL 2K3	Sega	A random crash will occur at the loading screen when launching a quick game. During system link games, there are performance drops and random de-syncing between consoles. There are minor performance drops during gameplay, and after a goal is scored, an audio squeal can be heard.		NA	
NHL Hitz 2003	Midway Games				
NHL Hitz Pro	Midway Games	During faceoffs and replays, there is minor flickering on the players.			
NightCaster	Microsoft Game Studios	Audio dialogue ends early during the gameplay, and there is a minor performance drop during the opening and closing of the spellbook.			
Ninja Gaiden	Tecmo	The unlockable NES arcade games cannot be played.			
Ninja Gaiden Black	Tecmo	This title is rendered at a slightly reduced speed on PAL-50 televisions. The game runs normally under PAL-60. The unlockable NES arcade game can't be played.	XO XBO		
Oddworld: Munch's Oddysee	Infogrames	The frame rate drops during in-game cinematics, and the sound effects sound very distant.	XBO		
Open Season	Ubisoft	The camera is jittery when running uphill on the Beaver Damage Stage.			
Outlaw Golf 2	Global Star Software				
Outlaw Golf 9 More Holes of X-mas	Simon & Schuster	Frame rate drops during gameplay.			
Outlaw Tennis	Global Star Software				
Outlaw Volleyball	Simon & Schuster	Flickering background graphics occur during a match.			
Outlaw Volleyball: Red Hot	Simon & Schuster				
OutRun 2	Microsoft Game Studios	Audio loops occasionally get stuck. Graphics do not always stream in time around checkpoints. Performance drops during game play.			
OutRun 2006: Coast 2 Coast	Sega	The loading screen hangs for quite a long time, but eventually the game starts and plays as expected.			
Over the Hedge	Activision				
Pac-Man World 3	Namco	Character motion can be blurry.			
Panzer Dragoon Orta	Sega		XBO		
Panzer Elite Action: Fields of Glory	JoWooD Entertainment		XBO	PAL	
Pariah	Groove Games	There is a minor, but recurring, drop in performance during gameplay. The Loading bar does not display until it is almost full. There is a green line in the pre-game introduction video.			
Phantom Crash	Phantagram	Audio does not work in cutscenes. The game also does not play music. Low framerate during game play.			
Phantom Dust	Majesco, Microsoft Game Studios	The system occasionally hangs during gameplay.			
Pinball Hall of Fame: The Gottlieb Collection	Crave Entertainment				
Pitfall: The Lost Expedition	Activision				
Playboy: The Mansion	Arush Entertainment, Groove Games				
Predator: Concrete Jungle	Vivendi Universal Games				
Prince of Persia: The Sands of Time	Ubisoft	Frame drops on larger areas when enemies are present. Unlockable mini-games do not play correctly for this title.	XBO		
Pro Race Driver; TOCA Race Driver (PAL)	Codemasters				
Project Gotham Racing	Microsoft Game Studios	There are severe FPS drops on several maps.			
Project Gotham Racing 2	Microsoft Game Studios	Cars don't render properly in Car Select and Transmission Select. The car radio does not work in-game.			
PocketBike Racer	King Games	Game includes Original Xbox and Xbox 360 versions on a single disc.		NA	
Psychonauts	Majesco	The game has a tendency to apply the pause menu texture to Raz's clothing upon closing it, turning it blue.	XO XBO	NA PAL	
Pump It Up: Exceed	Mastiff				
The Punisher	THQ				
Pure Pinball	XS Games				
Puyo Pop Fever	Sega		XO	J	(Note: The official backward compatibility list erroneously states only the North American version of this game is supported on the Xbox 360. This title was only released for the Nintendo GameCube in North America. This title was released as an Xbox Original only for Japanese Xbox 360 owners.)
Quantum Redshift	Microsoft Game Studios				
RalliSport Challenge	Microsoft Game Studios	Loading screen is visually broken. Game occasionally ignores input of the start button.			
Rapala Pro Fishing	Activision	The compass fails to load in certain levels, and fish can become stuck in the rocks when on the line.			
Rayman Arena	Ubi Soft				
Raze's Hell	Majesco		XO		
Red Dead Revolver	Rockstar Games	There is some graphics flicker in HD video mode, which can be resolved by switching to 480p video output. When fighting the boss "Bad Bessie", if the player gets too close to her the game will freeze. A workaround can be found on a GameFAQs forum.	XBO		
Red Faction II	THQ		XBO		
RedCard 2003	Midway Games				
Reservoir Dogs	Eidos				
Return to Castle Wolfenstein: Tides of War	Activision	Heavy framerate drops on some levels.			
Richard Burns Rally	SCi	Game play pauses during Exercise in the Rally School.		PAL	
Run Like Hell	Interplay Entertainment				
RoadKill	Midway Games	Main Menu does not display. Press A to launch single player mode. Widescreen mode is activated, but is squished to 4:3 480p widescreen and HD resolutions. Only will switching to HD VGA modes and changing the aspect ratio to 4:3 will fix this issue.			
Robin Hood: Defender of the Crown	ZOO Digital Group, Capcom				
Robotech: Battlecry	TDK Mediactive				
Rocky	Ubisoft			NA	
Rocky Legends	Ubisoft				
Rogue Ops	Kemco				
Rogue Trooper	Eidos				
Rugby 06	EA Sports	There is audio stuttering during the gameplay, and players render as a dark silhouette on the right side of the field but only during the first game played.			
Rugby League 2	Tru Blu Entertainment				
Samurai Jack: The Shadow of Aku	Sega	An Xbox version was planned but never released, however this title is included on Microsoft's official backwards compatible list.		Unreleased	
Samurai Warriors	Koei				
Scarface: The World Is Yours	Vivendi Games				
Scooby-Doo! Night of 100 Frights	THQ	Game crashes on the final boss, making it impossible to complete the game on this version.			
Scrapland	Enlight Software				
Sega GT 2002	Sega	Title plays very slowly. Occasional crashes during replays and occasional moderate frame rate drops.			
Sega GT Online	Sega	Performance drops too low on many levels.			
Sega Soccer Slam	Sega		XO		
Serious Sam	Gathering of Developers				
Shadow Ops: Red Mercury	Atari	Performance drops with poor frame-per-second rate in gameplay. PAL edition not backwards compatible.			
Shadow the Hedgehog	Sega	The game may occasionally or often crash during cutscenes, levels, loading screens and when skipping cutscenes. switching the console manually to 480p can make it less common. The cgi cutscenes are slowed down to 15 FPS.			
Shamu's Deep Sea Adventures	Activision				
Shark Tale	Activision	While running at 480p in-game cinematics are choppy. A random crash will occur during the DreamWorks logo.			
Shattered Union	2K Games				
Shellshock: Nam '67	Eidos				
Shenmue II	Microsoft Game Studios	All shadows and most post-processing effects do not appear. Trying to switch screen filters doesn't work, only pausing the game for a moment and continuing like nothing happened. Trying to play Space Harrier and Hang-On will crash the game.			
Shinchou Mahjong (Nobunaga Mahjong)	E-Frontier	A line-like graphic is displayed near the character's neck.			
Shrek 2	Activision				
Shrek Super Party	TDK Mediactive				
Sid Meier's Pirates!	2K Games	While sailing on the world map, there are occasional choppy animations. The German version of the game has a bug that doesn't allow dividing the plunder, making the game unbeatable. 2K never fixed the bug on Xbox or Xbox One. The game did not get sold as an Xbox Original in Germany.	XO XBO		
Silent Hill 2: Restless Dreams	Konami	The PAL version will only display a Black Screen. NTSC works but has numerous glitches. Textures will sometimes fail to load resulting in either completely white or see-through environments or wrongly assigned textures. The flashlight illuminates around the player instead of only in front of them. There is a save file glitch where you cannot save multiple saves on the same file. You can only overwrite the previous file or make a new one entirely otherwise the game will display a black screen the next time you start it up. The close-up screens for the puzzles will sometimes display the wrong screen.			
Silent Hill 4: The Room	Konami	Visible seams on NPCs' faces during cutscenes.			
The Simpsons: Hit & Run	Vivendi Universal Games	Significant screen-tearing throughout (manually dropping the Xbox 360's resolution to 480p yields moderate improvements).			
The Simpsons: Road Rage	Electronic Arts	Missing some character voices. Noticeable on character select screen and when dropping off someone at their destination. Framerate tends to drop during game			
The Sims 2	Electronic Arts				
Smashing Drive	Namco				
Sneak King	King Games	Game includes Original Xbox and Xbox 360 versions on a single disc.		NA	
Sneakers	Microsoft Game Studios			NA PAL	
Sonic Heroes	Sega	Higher resolutions cause pixelated/jagged textures on UI elements and Some UI elements have lines on them. Recap of pre-rendered cutscenes play their respective audio over the credits overlapping the respective teams' story mode song. Credits scroll slightly slower so they will still continue after the respective Team's Song. CGI cutscenes run at about 15FPS.			
Sonic Mega Collection Plus	Sega				
Sonic Riders	Sega	Pre rendered videos on menus can easily start flickering, glitching out or not working, it usually happens when going back and forth from most menus, but it can happen by itself, videos viewed in the theatre mode can even become seizure inducing with the screen turning white every other frame. The game runs worse than on original Xbox the more players are on a race.			
Soulcalibur II	Namco	The controller vibration does not work.			
Spawn: Armageddon	Namco				
Speed Kings	Acclaim Entertainment				
Sphinx and the Cursed Mummy	THQ		XBO		
Spider-Man	Activision	Minor frame rate drops.			
Spider-Man 2	Activision	Textures flicker during the game.			
Splat Magazine Renegade Paintball	Take-Two Interactive				
SpongeBob SquarePants: Battle for Bikini Bottom	THQ	Skybox texture will sometimes glitch, showing a tesselation of random colors.			
SpongeBob SquarePants: Lights, Camera, Pants!	THQ				
The SpongeBob SquarePants Movie	THQ	Certain textures load incorrectly in the game.			
SpyHunter 2	Midway Games				
SpyHunter: Nowhere to Run	Midway Games				
Spyro: A Hero's Tail	Vivendi Universal Games	May freeze in the middle of gameplay. Also, whilst selectable, the minigame and art View options from the menu screen will not appear, leaving you with a blank screen, which can be blindly navigated.			
SSX 3	EA Sports BIG	This title has minor graphical glitches.	XBO		
Stake: Fortune Fighters	Metro3D, Inc.				
Star Wars: Battlefront	LucasArts	In some instances, system link games may freeze. The ice cave on the "Rhen Var Harbor" map has major texture flickering.	XBO		
Star Wars: Battlefront II	LucasArts		XBO		
Star Wars Episode III: Revenge of the Sith	LucasArts		XBO		
Star Wars Jedi Knight: Jedi Academy	LucasArts	Cannot play split-screen games for this title.	XBO		
Star Wars: Jedi Starfighter	LucasArts	Minor slowdown during menu selections and transitions, minor performance issues during cut scenes. Items on HUD may randomly become solid instead of transparent.	XBO		
Star Wars: Knights of the Old Republic	LucasArts	Heavy frame drops during many sections, leaving the game with worse performance than on original hardware.	XBO		
Star Wars: Knights of the Old Republic II – The Sith Lords	LucasArts	Severe audio glitches: soundtrack and combat music will cut out after a series of intermittent buzzing-like sounds usually in the menu screen. Severe framerate drops during combat. Player characters will freeze in place and phase ahead instead of walking/running. Save file corruption is also a distinct possibility. The game should be played exclusively on the first generation Xbox for an optimal experience.	XBO		
Star Wars: Republic Commando	LucasArts		XBO		
Starsky and Hutch	Empire Interactive				
State of Emergency	Rockstar Games				
Street Fighter Anniversary Collection	Capcom				
Street Racing Syndicate	Namco				
Stubbs the Zombie in Rebel Without a Pulse	Aspyr Media		XO		
The Suffering	Midway Games				
Super Bubble Pop	Jaleco				
Super Monkey Ball Deluxe	Sega	The game emulates lag incorrectly, causing stages such as Warp and Speedy Jam to slow down much more than on an original Xbox. There is a serious issue where Monkey Fight DX has a serious graphical rendering issue rendering Monkey Fight DX unplayable. Monkey Soccer DX suffers from a glitch where the screen goes black with an infinite soccer ball kick sound effect playing repeatedly in a loop. when the timer in Monkey Soccer DX hits 0:00 the game crashes instantly On PAL systems, the subtitled speech bubbles in story mode cutscenes are out of sync. The game also takes over 2 minutes to start up.			
SX Superstar	AKA Acclaim				
Syberia II	XS Games	Game takes almost a minute to load from the Xbox splash screen. There are graphical issues when moving between screens.			
Taz: Wanted	Infogrames	During World 3, Stage 2: Haunted there is a partially mis-textured graphic. The reconnect controller screen is not displayed.			
Teenage Mutant Ninja Turtles	Konami				
Teenage Mutant Ninja Turtles: Mutant Melee	Konami	The introductory video stutters.			
The Terminator: Dawn of Fate	Infogrames				
Terminator 3: Rise of the Machines	Atari	There is a minor performance drop during gameplay. The black bars are not positioned properly at 640x480 VGA.			
Test Drive	Infogrames	There are minor performance drops and minor texture flickering during gameplay. Character voices are missing during cut scenes from stage 35 until end of game.		NA	
Test Drive: Eve of Destruction; Driven to Destruction (PAL)	Atari				
Tetris Worlds	THQ	The opening video displays a grey screen with audio only upon starting the game. Star Wars: The Clone Wars/Tetris Worlds promotional disc will not load.			
Thief: Deadly Shadows	Eidos				
The Thing	Vivendi Universal Games				
Thousand Land	FromSoftware				
Thrillville	LucasArts	There is an occasional random crash during gameplay. The Pirate Raiders mini-game sometimes loads without environments. In the Event Horizon mini-game, enemy sprites are missing and are replaced by a white rectangle.	XBO		
Tiger Woods PGA Tour 07	EA Games				
Tom and Jerry in War of the Whiskers	NewKidCo				
Tom Clancy's Ghost Recon	Ubi Soft				
Tom Clancy's Ghost Recon 2	Ubisoft	Night vision doesn't work properly in split-screen multiplayer.			
Tom Clancy's Ghost Recon 2: Summit Strike	Ubisoft	In split-screen multiplayer games, the screen is completely black.			
Tom Clancy's Ghost Recon: Island Thunder	Ubi Soft	In-game voice chat is not working.			
Tom Clancy's Rainbow Six 3	Ubisoft				
Tom Clancy's Rainbow Six 3: Black Arrow	Ubisoft				
Tom Clancy's Rainbow Six: Lockdown	Ubisoft				
Tom Clancy's Splinter Cell	Ubi Soft		XBO		
Tom Clancy's Splinter Cell: Chaos Theory	Ubisoft		XO XBO		
Tom Clancy's Splinter Cell: Double Agent	Ubisoft	When accessing Versus Mode, the system occasionally hangs and the video signal is corrupted. Frame rate drops in the second and third missions. The Save File Snapshot Photo is corrupted after saving.	XBO		
Tom Clancy's Splinter Cell: Pandora Tomorrow	Ubisoft		XBO		
Tony Hawk's American Wasteland	Activision	Cheats don't work and there is constant freezing when opening tabs.			
Tony Hawk's Pro Skater 2X	Activision	There are graphic obstructions in system link.			
Tony Hawk's Pro Skater 3	Activision	Client soft locks after the host leaves a system link game. Game will freeze at the Xbox logo unless playing with the console's resolution set to 480p or by playing with AV Cables. Does not run at full frame rate.			
Tony Hawk's Pro Skater 4	Activision	The loading progress bar is missing. Game will freeze at the Xbox logo unless playing with the console's resolution set to 480p or by playing with AV Cables.			
Tony Hawk's Underground	Activision	The loading progress bar is missing.			
Tony Hawk's Underground 2	Activision	Heavy framerate chugging and loss; loading progress bar is missing.			
Torino 2006	2K Games				
Tork: Prehistoric Punk	Ubisoft				
Toxic Grind	THQ				
Transworld Surf	Infogrames				
Trigger Man	Crave Entertainment				
Trivial Pursuit: Unhinged	Atari	Stuttering occurs during the logo animations during start-up on the splash screen. Texture errors on occur on command prompts.			
True Crime: Streets of LA	Activision	When operating the car, a small indistinct screen appears. Graphic defects are displayed around the track name.			
Turok: Evolution	Acclaim Entertainment	During gameplay there are flickering textures.			
Ty the Tasmanian Tiger	EA Games				
Ty the Tasmanian Tiger 2: Bush Rescue	EA Games				
Ty the Tasmanian Tiger 3: Night of the Quinkan	Activision				
UEFA Euro 2004 (Note: Microsoft has this game listed under the title Euro 2004.)	EA Sports				
Ultimate Spider-Man	Activision				
Ultra Bust-a-Move; Ultra Puzzle Bobble (JP)	Majesco				
Unreal Championship 2: The Liandri Conflict	Midway Games	The frame rate drops in the Story Mode character selection screen. There are occasional system hangs during Instant Action games, and after leaving the game while navigating back to the Xbox Dashboard. There are some missing textures on the Eternal map.	XBO		
The Urbz: Sims in the City	EA Games	In the Cozmo Street area the game stutters. While on loading screens random system hardlocks will occur.			
Van Helsing	Vivendi Universal Games	At the top edge of the main menu and mission briefing screens there is flickering.			
Vexx	Acclaim Entertainment				
Vietcong: Purple Haze	Gathering				
Volvo: Drive For Life	Microsoft Game Studios				
Wakeboarding Unleashed Featuring Shaun Murray	Activision				
WarPath	Groove Games			NA	
Whacked!	Microsoft Game Studios	On boot, there's a high chance the Microsoft Game Studios and Presto Studios FMVs will not play. Loading screens do not display correctly. While on the High Rise level characters will flicker. During the Space Walk level there is some texture tearing when in combat or being knocked off the platform.			
WinBack 2: Project Poseidon	Koei	When switching to character B there are some missing textures.			
Without Warning	Capcom	Some texture corruption, gameplay freezes briefly.			
World Series Baseball 2K3	Sega				
World Soccer Winning Eleven 8 International; World Soccer: Winning Eleven 8 (JP)	Konami				
World Soccer Winning Eleven 9 International (Note: Microsoft has this game listed twice under the titles World Soccer Winning Eleven 9 and Pro Evolution Soccer 5.); Pro Evolution Soccer 5 (PAL); World Soccer: Winning Eleven 9 (JP)	Konami				
Worms 3D	Sega				
Worms 4: Mayhem	Codemasters, Majesco				
Worms Forts: Under Siege	Sega				
Wrath Unleashed	LucasArts	Upon completion of a battle the "You are Victorious" audio file may play twice. Only weapons and armor of the models are drawn. Game units "Centaur" and "Centabra" will not display on the map.			
WWE Raw 2	THQ				
WWF Raw	THQ	When six characters are present on screen the game runs very slowly.			
X2: Wolverine's Revenge	Activision	When approaching locker cabinets they will flash. Characters/surrounding environments experience minor, occasional texture flickering on later levels			
Xiaolin Showdown	Konami				
XIII	Ubisoft				
Yourself!Fitness	Respondesign				
Yu-Gi-Oh! The Dawn of Destiny	Konami	During system link play random crashes and system hardlocks will occur.			
Zapper: One Wicked Cricket	Infogrames		XO		
Zathura	2K Games	During the first level there is missing audio in the pre-rendered video.			

== List of Xbox titles removed from backward compatibility list ==
The following Xbox titles listed below were initially announced as being backwards compatible with Xbox 360 that were later removed from the official list from Microsoft.

XBO Xbox One Backward Compatible

Title	Publisher(s)	Date available	Date removed	Technical issues	Add-Ons	Ref(s)
2002 FIFA World Cup	EA Sports	November 22, 2005	December 1, 2005			
Codename: Kids Next Door – Operation: V.I.D.E.O.G.A.M.E.	Global Star Software	November 22, 2005	December 1, 2005	Every time the player tried to save or overwrite a file, it would tell them it failed. There was also some noticeable artifacting in text, and certain voice lines or sound effects would not play, most notably when in dialogue.		
Curse: The Eye of Isis	DreamCatcher, Wanadoo	November 22, 2005	December 1, 2005			
James Bond 007: Nightfire	EA Games	November 22, 2005	February 14, 2008	The driving sections and on-rail sections of missions do not load, meaning 5 of the 12 missions are unplayable.		(Note: James Bond 007: Nightfire, Sniper Elite and Tecmo Classic Arcade were original Xbox titles that were announced would be backwards compatible with Xbox 360 from its launch date. The titles remained on the official list from Microsoft until the website was updated on February 14, 2008 removing the titles from the list. Sniper Elite was included on Microsoft's official list of technical issues for certain Xbox games on Xbox 360. The page was removed between October and November 2010 when the official Xbox website was given a redesign. The titles are not included on the current official backward compatible list from Microsoft.)
Legends of Wrestling	Acclaim Entertainment	November 22, 2005	December 1, 2005			
NBA Live 2003	EA Sports	November 22, 2005	December 1, 2005			
Rugby 2005	EA Sports	November 22, 2005	December 1, 2005			
Sniper Elite	Namco	November 22, 2005	February 14, 2008	When beginning a single player mission the game hangs.		
Star Wars: The Clone Wars	LucasArts	November 22, 2005	December 1, 2005	When text is displayed there are graphical artifacts.	XBO	
Tecmo Classic Arcade	Tecmo	November 22, 2005	February 14, 2008			

== See also ==
- Xbox 360 system software
- List of backward-compatible games for Xbox One and Series X/S
