= List of downloadable PlayStation Portable games =

This is a list of games for Sony's PlayStation Portable (PSP) handheld game console made available to download from the PlayStation Store. The ability to download and play these titles has varied among titles between the platforms of PSP, PlayStation Vita (PSV), PlayStation TV (PSTV), PlayStation 4 (PS4), and PlayStation 5 (PS5). Titles released on the latter two are the original games software emulated. If a downloadable PSP game has been purchased for a device released prior to the PS4, the title is automatically added to the user's library on all devices for which there is a release.

For some of the PSP titles lacking official support for PSV and PSTV, this was previously able to be circumvented by transferring the game to the device via a PS3. However, the ability to transfer games to and from a PS3 was lost in a 2022 update.

On PS4 and PS5, they display in high-definition and may feature the addition of trophies. The PS4 and PS5 releases are bundled together, and the former is also playable on PS5 through backwards compatibility.

This list does not include other titles made downloadable on PSP, namely PlayStation Minis or PSOne Classics.

== PSP games ==
List of the 807 PSP games available to download from the PlayStation Store. Almost all first-party PSP games released after October 1, 2009, are available for download on PSP.

Title	Developer	PSP	PSV	PSTV	PS4	PS5
12Riven: The Psi-Climinal of Integral	Cyber Front	December 10, 2009 (North America); December 10, 2009 (Japan)				
7 Wonders of the Ancient World	MumboJumbo	April 1, 2009 (North America); March 9, 2011 (Japan)				
7th Dragon 2020	Sega	November 23, 2011 (Japan)				
101-in-1 Megamix	QV Software	September 20, 2010 (North America)	February 9, 2012 (North America)			
300: March to Glory	Collision Studios	September 30, 2009 (North America)	February 9, 2012 (North America)			
2010 FIFA World Cup South Africa	Electronic Arts	April 26, 2010 (North America); May 13, 2010 (Japan)				
Ace Combat: Joint Assault	Bandai Namco	September 6, 2009 (North America)Withdrawn; September 7, 2010 (Europe); August 31, 2010 (Japan)	February 9, 2012 (North America)			
Activision Hits: Remixed	Activision	September 30, 2009 (North America); October 1, 2009 (Europe)				
Adventures To Go!	Natsume Inc.	March 24, 2010 (North America); March 25, 2010 (Europe)				
Aedis Eclipse: Generation of Chaos	Neverland	December 21, 2009 (North America); December 22, 2009 (Europe)				
After Burner: Black Falcon	Sega	February 3, 2010 (North America)Withdrawn; February 4, 2010 (Europe)				
AI Go (Best Collection)	Marvelous Entertainment	November 20, 2009 (Japan)				
AI Mahjong (Best Collection)	Marvelous Entertainment	November 20, 2009 (Japan)				
AI Shogi (Best Collection)	Marvelous Entertainment	November 20, 2009 (Japan)				
Air (visual novel)	Prototype	September 2, 2010 (Japan)				
Akatsuki no Amaneka to Aoi Kyojin	Cyber Front	June 24, 2010 (Japan)				
AKB1/48: Idol to Guam to Koishitara...	Bandai Namco	October 6, 2011 (Japan)				
Akiba's Trip	Acquire	July 6, 2011 (Japan)				
Alien Syndrome	Sega	September 30, 2009 (North America); October 8, 2009 (Europe)				
Amagoushi no Yakata Portable: Ichiyagi Wa, Saisho no Junan	Nippon Ichi Software	December 17, 2009 (Japan)				
Anata o Yurusanai	AQ Interactive	August 10, 2009 (Japan)				
Antiphona no Seikahime: Tenshi no Gakufu Op.A	Nippon Ichi Software	December 24, 2009 (Japan)				
Ape Academy	Japan Studio	April 9, 2009 (Europe); September 24, 2009 (Japan)			October 17, 2023 (North America)	October 17, 2023 (North America)
Ape Academy 2	Japan Studio, SIMS	March 5, 2008 (North America); September 24, 2009 (Europe)			March 21, 2023 (Europe)	March 21, 2023 (Europe)
Ape Escape: On the Loose	Japan Studio, SIMS	March 5, 2008 (North America)			August 15, 2023 (North America)	August 15, 2023 (North America)
Ape Quest	Japan Studio	January 10, 2008 (North America); May 1, 2008 (Europe); March 19, 2009 (Japan)				
Archer Maclean's Mercury	Awesome Studios	December 3, 2008 (North America); July 9, 2009 (Europe)				
Armored Core: Formula Front	From Software	November 1, 2009 (Japan)				
Armored Core: Last Raven Portable	From Software	May 3, 2010 (North America); May 4, 2010 (Europe)	February 9, 2012 (North America)			
Armored Core: Silent Line Portable	From Software	February 3, 2010 (North America); February 4, 2010 (North America)	February 9, 2012 (North America)			
Arms' Heart	Hamster	November 25, 2010 (Japan)				
Army of Two: The 40th Day	Buzz Monkey	January 11, 2010 (North America); January 14, 2010 (Europe)				
Army of Two: The 40th Day	Buzz Monkey	January 11, 2010 (North America); January 14, 2010 (Europe)				
Asphalt: Urban GT 2	Gameloft	January 7, 2010 (Europe)				
Assassin's Creed: Bloodlines	Griptonite Games	November 17, 2009 (North America); November 19, 2009 (Europe)				
Astonisha Story	Sonnori	January 7, 2010 (Europe)				
Astro Boy: The Video Game	High Voltage Software	October 14, 2009 (North America)Withdrawn; October 22, 2009 (Europe)				
Auditorium	Zoo Games, Inc.	January 4, 2011 (North America)				
Avatar: The Last Airbender	THQ	September 30, 2009 (North America)Withdrawn				
B-Boy	FreeStyleGames	November 20, 2007 (Europe)				
Bakugan: Defenders of the Core	Activision	October 25, 2010 (North America)Withdrawn; December 15, 2010 (Europe)				
Battle Chess	Activision	August 31, 2010 (Japan)				
Beaterator	Rockstar Leeds	October 1, 2009 (North America); October 2, 2009 (Europe)				
Beats	London Studio	December 6, 2007 (North America); November 20, 2007 (Europe); April 19, 2008 (Japan)				
Bejeweled 2	Popcap Games	June 28, 2010 (North America)Withdrawn				
Ben 10: Alien Force	Monkey Bar Games	November 4, 2009 (North America)Withdrawn				
Ben 10 Alien Force: Vilgax Attacks	Papaya Studio	October 26, 2009 (North America)Withdrawn; February 4, 2010 (Europe)				
Ben 10: Protector of Earth	High Voltage Software	November 4, 2009 (North America)Withdrawn; January 21, 2010 (Europe)				
Ben 10 Ultimate Alien: Cosmic Destruction	Papaya Studio	October 4, 2010 (North America)Withdrawn				
Beta Bloc	Tamsoft	December 2, 2009 (North America)				
Blade Dancer: Lineage of Light	Hit Maker	September 30, 2009 (North America)			May 16, 2023 (North America)	May 16, 2023 (North America)
BlazBlue: Continuum Shift II	Arc System Works	May 30, 2011 (North America); November 23, 2011 (Europe); March 31, 2011 (Japan)				
BlazBlue Portable	Arc System Works	March 31, 2010 (North America)				
Blazing Souls Accelate	Aksys Games	October 18, 2010 (North America)				
Bomberman Land	Hudson Soft	January 7, 2010 (North America)	February 9, 2012 (North America)			
Bomberman Legacy	Hudson Soft	November 22, 2010 (North America)	February 9, 2012 (North America)			
Brain Challenge	Gameloft	December 4, 2008 (North America)				
Brandish: Dark Revenant (Falcom Super Price)	Falcom	January 13, 2015(North America)				
Brave Story: New Traveler	Game Republic	July 30, 2009 (North America) Withdrawn				
Breath of Fire III	Capcom	Feb 9, 2016(North America)				
Brothers in Arms: D-Day	Gearbox Software	June 25, 2009 (North America)				
Brunswick Pro Bowling	Crave Entertainment	September 30, 2009 (North America)				
Burnout Dominator	EA UK	September 30, 2009 (North America)				
Burnout Legends	EA UK	September 30, 2009 (North America)				
Buzz!: Brain Bender	Curve Studios	March 31, 2010 (North America)Withdrawn				
Buzz!: Master Quiz	Relentless Software, Curve Studios	March 31, 2010 (North America)				
Buzz!: Quiz World	Relentless Software	December 17, 2009 (North America)				
Cabela's African Safari	Activision	September 30, 2009 (North America)Withdrawn				
Cabela's Dangerous Hunts: Ultimate Challenge	Activision	September 30, 2009 (North America)Withdrawn				
Cabela's North American Adventures	Activision	September 13, 2010 (North America)Withdrawn				
Call of Duty: Roads to Victory	Activision	March 13, 2007 (North America)Code only: "w/ Call of Duty: Black Ops Declassified				
Capcom Classics Collection Reloaded	Capcom	September 30, 2009 (North America)				
Capcom Classics Collection Remixed	Capcom	July 2, 2009 (North America)				
Capcom Puzzle World	Capcom	October 22, 2009 (North America)				
Castlevania: The Dracula X Chronicles	Konami	December 10, 2009 (North America); June 18, 2014 (Europe); November 1, 2009 (Japan)				
Carnage Heart EXA	Artdink	March 9, 2013 (Europe); October 29, 2010 (Japan)				
Chessmaster: The Art of Learning	Ubisoft	June 25, 2009 (North America)Withdrawn				
Cho Aniki Zero	GungHo	March 24, 2010 (North America)				
Cladun: This is an RPG!	Nippon Ichi Software	September 20, 2010 (North America)				
Class of Heroes	Acquire	November 4, 2009 (North America)				
Class of Heroes 2	Acquire	June 4, 2013 (North America)				
Cloudy with a Chance of Meatballs	Ubisoft	September 30, 2009 (North America)				
Coded Arms	Konami	December 10, 2009 (North America)				
Colin McRae: DiRT 2	Codemasters	September 30, 2009 (North America)Withdrawn				
The Con	Think & Feel Inc.	May 22, 2008 (North America)				
Crash: Mind Over Mutant	Activision	September 30, 2009 (North America)				
Crash of the Titans	Activision	September 30, 2009 (North America)				
Crash Tag Team Racing	Activision	September 30, 2009 (North America)				
Crazy Taxi: Fare Wars	Sega	September 30, 2009 (North America)				
Creature Defense	Hudson Soft	November 5, 2009 (North America)				
Crimson Gem Saga	Matrix Software	October 22, 2009 (North America)Withdrawn				
Crimson Room Reverse	Takagism Inc.	November 5, 2009 (North America)				
Crush	Zoë Mode	September 30, 2009 (North America)				
Crystal Defenders	Square Enix	October 29, 2009 (North America)				
Cube: 3D Puzzle Mayhem	Metia Interactive	September 18, 2008 (North America)Withdrawn				
Dante's Inferno (video game)	Artificial Mind and Movement	March 3, 2010 (North America)				
Darkstalkers Chronicle: The Chaos Tower	Capcom	October 29, 2009 (North America)				
Daxter	Ready at Dawn	September 30, 2009 (North America); October 8, 2009 (Europe)				
Dead Head Fred	Vicious Cycle	October 16, 2008 (North America)				
Dead or Alive Paradise	Koei Tecmo	April 1, 2010 (North America)				
Death Jr.	Backbone Entertainment	December 10, 2008 (North America)				
Death Jr. II: Root of Evil	Backbone Entertainment	December 10, 2008 (North America)				
Def Jam Fight for NY: The Takeover	Aki Corporation, EA Canada	September 30, 2009 (North America)				
Despicable Me: The Game	D3Publisher	July 5, 2010 (North America)Withdrawn				
DiRT 2	Codemasters, Inc.	September 30, 2009 (North America)Withdrawn				
Disgaea: Afternoon of Darkness	Nippon Ichi Software	September 30, 2009 (North America)				
Disgaea 2: Dark Hero Days	Nippon Ichi Software	September 30, 2009 (North America)				
Disgaea Infinite	Nippon Ichi Software	June 8, 2010 (North America)				
Dissidia: Final Fantasy	Square Enix	November 5, 2009 (North America)	February 9, 2012 (North America)			
Dissidia 012: Duodecim Final Fantasy	Square Enix	March 21, 2011 (North America)	February 9, 2012 (North America)			
DJ Max Fever	Pentavision Entertainment	January 21, 2010 (North America)Withdrawn				
DJ Max Portable	Pentavision Entertainment	October 18, 2010 (North America)Withdrawn				
DJ Max Portable 3	Pentavision Entertainment	October 18, 2010 (North America)				
Dragon Ball Z Shin Budokai	Atari	September 30, 2009 (North America) Withdrawn				
Dragon Ball Z: Shin Budokai Another Road	Atari	September 30, 2009 (North America) Withdrawn				
Dragon's Lair	Digital Leisure	March 28, 2011 (North America)				
Dragoneer's Aria	Hit Maker	September 30, 2009 (North America)				
Driver 76	Sumo Digital; Ubisoft Reflections	June 25, 2009 (North America)				
Dungeon Explorer: Warriors of Ancient Arts	Hudson Soft	January 6, 2010 (North America)				
Dungeon Maker: Hunting Ground	Global A	November 5, 2009 (North America)				
Dynasty Warriors	Koei	August 6, 2009 (North America)				
Dynasty Warriors Volume 2	Koei	December 10, 2009 (North America)				
Dynasty Warriors: Strikeforce	Koei	September 30, 2009 (North America)				
Echochrome	Japan Studio	May 1, 2008 (North America)			June 13, 2022 (North America) (Europe)	June 13, 2022 (North America) (Europe)
echoshift	Japan Studio	February 24, 2010 (North America)			July 19, 2022 (North America); July 19, 2022 (Europe)	July 19, 2022 (North America); July 19, 2022 (Europe)
Everyday Shooter	Queasy Games	December 4, 2008 (North America)				
F1 2009	Codemasters	December 17, 2009 (North America)				
Fat Princess: Fistful of Cake	Titan Studios	May 3, 2010 (North America)				
Fate/Extra	Marvelous Entertainment	Nov 1, 2011 (North America); August 8, 2012 (Europe)				
Fate/Unlimited Codes	Type-Moon	September 3, 2009 (North America)Withdrawn				
Field Commander	Sony Online Entertainment	September 11, 2008 (North America)				
FIFA Soccer 10	EA Canada	October 22, 2009 (North America)Withdrawn				
FIFA Soccer 11	EA Canada	October 11, 2010 (North America)Withdrawn				
Fight Night Round 3	EA Chicago	September 30, 2009 (North America)				
Final Fantasy II	Square Enix	January 10, 2012 (Europe); February 22, 2011 (Japan)				
Final Fantasy III	Square Enix	September 25, 2012 (North America); September 26, 2012 (Europe)				
Final Fantasy IV: The Complete Collection	Square Enix	April 18, 2011 (North America); April 19, 2011 (Europe); March 24, 2011 (Japan)				
Final Fantasy Tactics: The War of the Lions	Square Enix	July 18, 2011 (North America); July 19, 2011 (Europe); March 9, 2011 (Japan)	February 9, 2012 (North America)			
flOw	SuperVillain Studios	March 6, 2008 (North America)				
Football Manager Handheld 2010	Sports Interactive	December 22, 2009 (North America)Withdrawn				
Football Manager Handheld 2011	Sports Interactive	December 6, 2010 (North America)Withdrawn				
Full Auto 2: Battlelines	Deep Fried Entertainment	September 30, 2009 (North America)				
G.I. Joe: The Rise of Cobra	Electronic Arts	September 30, 2009 (North America)Withdrawn				
Gangs of London	Team Soho	November 20, 2007 (North America)				
Generation of Chaos: Pandora's Reflection	Super Sting	February 19, 2013 (North America)				
Ghostbusters: The Video Game	Red Fly Studio	November 5, 2009 (North America)Withdrawn				
Gladiator Begins	Acquire	September 13, 2010 (North America)				
Go! Puzzle	Zoonami	February 7, 2008 (North America)				
Gods Eater Burst	Namco Bandai	March 15, 2011 (North America)Withdrawn				
God of War: Chains of Olympus	Ready at Dawn Studios	September 30, 2009 (North America); October 1, 2009 (Europe); March 11, 2010 (Japan)				
God of War: Ghost of Sparta	Ready at Dawn Studios	November 1, 2010 (North America); November 2, 2009 (Europe); July 30, 2009 (Japan)				
Gradius Collection	Konami	December 10, 2009 (North America)				
Gran Turismo	Polyphony Digital	September 30, 2009 (North America)				
Grand Theft Auto: Chinatown Wars	Rockstar Leeds	October 20, 2009 (North America)				
Grand Theft Auto: Liberty City Stories	Rockstar Leeds, Rockstar North	October 22, 2009 (North America)				
Grand Theft Auto: Vice City StoriesWithdrawn	Rockstar Leeds, Rockstar North	October 22, 2009 (North America)				
Gravity Crash Portable	SCEA	July 19, 2010 (North America)			July 18, 2023 (North America)	July 18, 2023 (North America)
Groovin' Blocks	SCEA	July 12, 2010 (North America)Withdrawn				
Growlanser: Wayfarer of Time	Career Soft	July 24, 2012 (North America); July 31, 2012 (Europe)				
GTI Club Supermini Festa!	Konami	February 24, 2010 (North America)Withdrawn				
Guilty Gear Judgment	Arc System Works	October 2, 2008 (North America)Withdrawn				
Guilty Gear XX Accent Core Plus	Arc System Works	September 30, 2009 (North America)	February 9, 2012 (North America)			
Gungnir	Atlus	June 12, 2012 (North America); June 12, 2012 (Europe)				
Gun Showdown	Activision	September 30, 2009 (North America)				
Gurumin: A Monstrous Adventure	Nihon Falcom	June 19, 2008 (North America)				
Half-Minute Hero	Opus	October 22, 2009 (North America); October 22, 2009 (Europe)				
Hammerin' Hero	Irem	October 22, 2009 (North America)Withdrawn				
Hannspree Ten Kate Honda: SBK Superbike World Championship	Valcon Games	September 6, 2010 (North America)Withdrawn				
Harvest Moon: Boy & Girl	Marvelous Entertainment	October 15, 2009 (North America)				
Harvest Moon: Hero of Leaf Valley	Marvelous Entertainment	May 10, 2010 (North America)				
Hexyz Force	Sting Entertainment	May 24, 2010 (North America)				
Hoard	Big Sandwich Games	March 21, 2011 (North America)				
Holy Invasion Of Privacy, Badman! What Did I Do To Deserve This?	Acquire	July 16, 2009 (North America)				
Hot Brain	Midway	September 30, 2009 (North America)				
Hot Shots Golf: Open Tee	Clap Hanz	March 20, 2008 (North America)				
Hot Shots Golf: Open Tee 2	Clap Hanz	June 11, 2009 (North America); June 11, 2009 (Europe)				
Hot Shots Shorties	Clap Hanz	January 3, 2011 (North America)				
Hot Shots Tennis: Get a Grip	Clap Hanz	June 28, 2010 (North America)				
IL2 Sturmovik: Birds of Prey	SME Dynamic Systems Ltd	September 30, 2009 (North America)				
Indiana Jones and the Staff of Kings	LucasArts	September 30, 2009 (North America)				
Innocent Life: A Futuristic Harvest Moon	ArtePiazza	October 15, 2009 (North America)				
Iron Man	Artificial Mind and Movement	September 30, 2009 (North America)Withdrawn				
Iron Man 2	Artificial Mind and Movement	May 3, 2010 (North America)Withdrawn				
Jak and Daxter: The Lost Frontier	High Impact Games	November 3, 2009 (North America)				
James Cameron's Avatar: The Game	Ubisoft	December 7, 2009 (North America)Withdrawn				
Jeanne d'Arc	Level 5	August 21, 2008 (North America)				
Jikandia: The Timeless Land	Idea Factory	March 14, 2011 (North America)				
Juiced 2: Hot Import Nights	THQ	September 30, 2009 (North America)Withdrawn				
Justice League Heroes	Warner Bros. Interactive	September 30, 2009 (North America)				
Kenka Bancho: Badass Rumble	Spike	November 12, 2009 (North America)				
Killzone: Liberation	Guerrilla Games	March 5, 2009 (North America)			June 20, 2023 (Europe)	June 20, 2023 (Europe)
Kingdom of Paradise	Climax Entertainment	April 24, 2008 (North America)			September 20, 2022 (Europe)	September 20, 2022 (Europe)
The King of Fighters Collection	SNK	September 30, 2009 (North America)				
King of Pool	Ivolgamus	April 8, 2010 (North America)				
Knights in the Nightmare	Sting	November 8, 2010 (North America)				
Kurulin Fusion	MTO USA	December 10, 2009 (North America)				
Legends of War: Patton's Campaign	Enigma Software	January 3, 2011 (North America)				
Lego Batman: The Video Game	Warner Bros. Interactive	September 30, 2009 (North America)	February 9, 2012 (North America)			
Lego Harry Potter: Years 1-4	Warner Bros. Interactive	July 19, 2010 (North America)				
Lego Harry Potter: Years 5-7	Warner Bros. Interactive	December 5, 2011 (North America)	February 9, 2012 (North America)			
Lego Indiana Jones: The Original Adventures	LucasArts	September 30, 2009 (North America)				
Lego Pirates of the Caribbean: The Video Game	Warner Bros. Interactive	May 16, 2011 (North America)	February 9, 2012 (North America)			
Lego Star Wars II: The Original Trilogy	Traveller's Tales				June 18, 2024 (North America)	June 18, 2024 (North America)
Lego Star Wars III: The Clone Wars	Warner Bros. Interactive	May 2, 2011 (North America)				
Lemmings	Team17	October 22, 2009 (North America)				
LittleBigPlanet	Media Molecule	November 24, 2009 (North America)				
LocoRoco	Japan Studio	April 24, 2008 (North America)				
LocoRoco 2	Japan Studio	September 30, 2009 (North America)				
LocoRoco Midnight Carnival	Japan Studio	October 29, 2009 (North America); October 29, 2009 (Europe)			July 19, 2022 (Europe)	July 19, 2022 (Europe)
Lord of Arcana	Square Enix	January 25, 2011 (North America)				
Lord of the Rings: Aragorn's Quest	Electronic Arts	December 6, 2010 (North America)				
Lord of the Rings: Tactics	Electronic Arts	September 30, 2009 (North America)Withdrawn				
Lunar: Silver Star Harmony	Game Arts	March 3, 2010 (North America)				
Luxor Pharaoh's Challenge	MumboJumbo	March 18, 2009 (North America)				
Luxor: The Wrath of Set	MumboJumbo	January 14, 2010 (North America)				
Madden NFL 10	EA Tiburon	September 30, 2009 (North America)Withdrawn				
Madden NFL 11	EA Tiburon	August 9, 2010 (North America)Withdrawn				
Madden NFL 12	EA Tiburon	August 29, 2011 (North America)Withdrawn				
Major League Baseball 2K10	2K Sports	March 1, 2010 (North America)Withdrawn				
Major League Baseball 2K11	2K Sports	March 15, 2011 (North America)Withdrawn				
Mana Khemia: Student Alliance	Gust	September 30, 2009 (North America)				
Manhunt 2	Rockstar Leeds	October 15, 2009 (North America)				
Marvel Super Hero Squad	THQ	October 22, 2009 (North America)Withdrawn				
Me & My Katamari	Namco	December 22, 2009 (North America)				
Medal of Honor Heroes	EA Canada	September 30, 2009 (North America)				
Medal of Honor Heroes 2	EA Canada	September 30, 2009 (North America)				
MediEvil: Resurrection	SCE Studio Cambridge	June 26, 2008 (North America)			August 15, 2023 (North America)	August 15, 2023 (North America)
Mega Man Maverick Hunter X	Capcom	October 29, 2009 (North America)				
Mercury Meltdown	Ignition Entertainment	March 12, 2009 (North America)				
Metal Gear Solid: Digital Graphic Novel	Konami	December 17, 2009 (North America)				
Metal Gear Solid: Peace Walker	Konami	June 8, 2010 (North America)				
Metal Gear Solid: Portable Ops	Konami	December 17, 2009 (North America)	June 1, 2016 (North America)	June 1, 2016 (North America)		
Metal Gear Solid: Portable Ops Plus	Konami	December 17, 2009 (North America)	June 1, 2016	June 1, 2016		
Metal Slug Anthology	SNK Playmore	September 30, 2009 (North America)	February 9, 2012 (North America)			
Metal Slug XX	SNK Playmore	June 8, 2010 (North America)	February 9, 2012 (North America)			
Michael Jackson: The Experience	Ubisoft	November 23, 2010 (North America)Withdrawn				
Midnight Club 3: DUB Edition	Rockstar Leeds	October 15, 2009 (North America)Withdrawn				
Midnight Club: L.A. Remix	Rockstar London	October 15, 2009 (North America); October 1, 2009 (Europe); July 30, 2009 (Japan)				
Midway Arcade Treasures: Extended Play	Warner Bros. Interactive	June 28, 2010 (North America)				
Military History: Commander: Europe at War	Slitherine Software	December 6, 2010 (North America)				
Mimana Iyar Chronicle	GungHo	April 14, 2010 (North America)				
Mind Quiz	Ubisoft	July 2, 2009 (North America)Withdrawn				
Minna de Dokusho: Keatai Shousetsu Desu	Dorasu					
Minna de Dokusho: Meisaku & Suiri & Kaidan & Bungaku	Dorasu					
Minna no Shiatsu: Itami mo Tsukare mo Sukirii!	Sony Computer Entertainment					
Misshitsu no Sacrifice	D3					
MLB 09 The Show	SCEA	September 30, 2009 (North America)Withdrawn				
MLB 10 The Show	SCEA	March 1, 2010 (North America)				
MLB 11: The Show	SCEA	March 7, 2011 (North America)				
Mobile Suit Gundam: Shin Gihren no Yabou	Bandai Namco					
ModNation Racers	United Front Games	May 24, 2010 (North America)				
Moe Moe 2-ji Taisen Ryoku Deluxe	System Soft					
Moe Moe Daisensou * Gendaiban+	System Soft					
Moeru Mahjong: Moejong!	Hudson Soft					
Momotarou Dentetsu Tag Match: Yuujou - Doryoku - Shouri no Maki!	Hudson					
Monochrome	Cyber Front					
MonHun Nikki: Poka Poka Ailu Mura	Capcom					
MonHun Nikki: Poka Poka Ailu Mura G	Capcom					
Monster Hunter Freedom Unite	Capcom	September 30, 2009 (North America); July 2, 2009 (Europe); March 11, 2009 (Japan)				
Monster Hunter Portable 3rd	Capcom					
Monster Jam: Path of Destruction	Activision	November 8, 2010 (North America)Withdrawn				
Monster Kingdom: Jewel Summoner	Gaia					
Mortal Kombat: Unchained	Midway	September 30, 2009 (North America)				
MotorStorm: Arctic Edge	Bigbig Studios	September 30, 2009 (North America); October 1, 2009 (Europe); November 1, 2009 (Japan)				
Musou Tourou	Nippon Ichi Software					
MX vs ATV Reflex	THQ	December 3, 2009 (North America)Withdrawn				
MX vs ATV Untamed	THQ	September 30, 2009 (North America)Withdrawn; January 28, 2009 (Europe); July 30, 2009 (Japan)				
Myst	Cyan Worlds	July 16, 2009 (North America)				
Mytran Wars	Deep Silver					
My Merry May with be	Cyber Front					
Nakahara no Hasha: Sangoku Shouseiden	Bandai Namco Games					
Namco Museum Battle Collection	Namco Bandai					
Namco Museum Vol.2	Bandai Namco Games					
Nanatama: Chronicle of Dungeon Maker	Global A Entertainment					
Nano Diver	TakaraTomy					
Naraku no Shiro Portable	Nippon Ichi Software					
Narisokonai Eiyuutan: Taiyou to Tsuki no Monogatari	Irem					
Naruto Shippuuden: Narutimate Impact	Bandai Namco					
NBA 10 The Inside	SCEA	October 8, 2009 (North America)				
NBA 2K10	Visual Concepts	October 29, 2009 (North America)Withdrawn; November 26, 2009 (Europe); July 30, 2009 (Japan)				
NBA 2K11	Visual Concepts	October 11, 2010 (North America)Withdrawn				
NBA 2K12	Visual Concepts	November 21, 2011 (North America)Withdrawn				
NBA Live 09	EA Canada	(Europe)Withdrawn (Japan)August 31, 2009				
NBA Live 10	EA Canada	October 8, 2009 (North America)Withdrawn; October 8, 2009 (Europe); November 1, 2009 (Japan)				
NCAA Football 10	Electronic Arts	September 30, 2009 (North America)Withdrawn				
Need for Speed Carbon	Electronic Arts	September 30, 2009 (North America)				
Need for Speed: Most Wanted: 5-1-0	EA Black Box	September 30, 2009 (North America)Withdrawn; April 16, 2009 (Europe); July 30, 2009 (Japan)				
Need for Speed: ProStreet	EA Black Box	September 30, 2009 (North America); April 23, 2009 (Europe); July 21, 2009				
Need for Speed: Shift	Slightly Mad Studios	September 30, 2009 (North America); September 18, 2009 (Europe); November 11, 2009 (Japan)				
Need for Speed: Undercover	EA Black Box					
Need for Speed Underground Rivals	Electronic Arts	September 30, 2009 (North America); January 21, 2009 (Europe); July 30, 2009 (Japan)				
Neo Geo Heroes: Ultimate Shooting	SNK Playmore	December 6, 2010 (North America)Withdrawn				
Neopets: Petpet Adventures: The Wand of Wishing	Santa Monica Studio	January 31, 2008 (North America)				
Neon Genesis Evangelion: 3nd Impact	Bandai Namco					
Neon Genesis Evangelion: Battle Orchestra Portable	Broccoli					
Neon Genesis Evangelion: Koutetsu no Girlfriend Portable	Cyber Front					
Neon Genesis Evangelion: Koutetsu no Girlfriend 2nd Portable	Cyber Front					
Never7 ~The End of Infinity~	Cyber Front					
Nicoli no Sudoku +2 Daiisshuu: Sudoku Nurikabe Heyawake	Hamster					
Nikoli no Sudoku +3 Dai-San-Shuu: Slither Link Masyu Yajilin	Hamster					
Nicoli no Sudoku +3 Dai-Ni-Shuu: Sudoku Kakuro Bijutsukan Hitori ni Shitekure	Hamster					
Nippon no Asoko de	Sony Computer Entertainment					
Nizu no Senritsu Portable	Cyber Front					
Nizu no Senritsu Portable 2: Hi no Kioku	Cyber Front					
No Heroes Allowed!	Acquire	November 1, 2010 (North America)			July 19, 2022 (Europe)	July 19, 2022 (Europe)
Nobunaga no Yabou: Reppuuden with Power Pack	Koei					
Nobunaga no Yabou: Shouseiroku	Koei					
Nobunaga no Yabou: Soutensoku with Power-Up Kit	Tecmo Koei					
Nobunaga no Yabou: Tenshoki	Koei					
No Fate! Only the Power of Will	Alchemist					
Nogizaka Haruka no Himitsu: Doujinshi Hajime Mashita	ASCII Media Works					
No Gravity: The Plague of Mind	Realtech VR	February 26, 2009 (North America); March 5, 2009 (Europe); March 1, 2009 (Japan)				
Numblast	SCE	November 5, 2009 (North America)Withdrawn; July 2, 2009 (Europe); June 11, 2009 (Japan)				
Numpla 10000-Mon	Hudson Soft					
Numpla & Oekaki Puzzle	Success					
Obscure: The Aftermath	Playlogic	September 30, 2009 (North America)Withdrawn; November 26, 2009 (Europe); July 30, 2009 (Japan)				
Off Road Racing	Razorworks					
Omoide ni Kawaru-Kun: Memories Off	Cyber Front					
Ore no Imōto ga Konnani Kawaii Wake ga Nai Portable	Bandai Namco Games					
Onore no Shinzuru Michi wo Yuke	From Software					
Ore no Shikabane o Koete Yuke	Sony Computer Entertainment					
Ossu! Banchou Portable	Daito Giken					
Otome wa Oanesama ni Koi Shiteru Portable: 2-Jin no Elder	Alchemist					
Pachipara Slot Pachislot Super Umi-monogatari in Okinawa	Irem					
PaRappa the Rapper	NaNaOn-Sha	July 24, 2008 (North America)				
Patapon	Japan Studio	September 3, 2009 (North America); August 13, 2009 (Europe); September 21, 2009 (Japan)				
Patapon 2	Japan Studio	May 7, 2009 (North America); March 12, 2009 (Europe); November 21, 2008(Japan)				
Patapon 3	Japan Studio	April 12, 2011 (North America); April 15, 2011 (Europe); April 21, 2011 (Japan)				
Patchwork Heroes	SCEA	March 17, 2010 (North America)				
PBR: Out of the Chute	D2C Games	November 25, 2008 (North America)				
Peggle	Popcap Games	November 15, 2010 (North America)Withdrawn				
Persona 2: Tsumi	Atlus					
Petz Dogz Family	Ubisoft	October 29, 2009 (North America)				
Petz Hamsterz Bunch	Ubisoft	October 29, 2009 (North America)				
Petz Saddle Club	Ubisoft	October 29, 2009 (North America)				
Petz: My Baby Hamster	Ubisoft					
Petz: My Puppy Family	Ubisoft					
Phantasy Star Portable 2	Sega	September 13, 2010 (North America)Withdrawn; October 6, 2010 (Europe); December 1, 2010 (Japan)				
Phantasy Star Portable 2 Infinity	Sega					
Phantom Brave Portable	Nippon Ichi Software	March 7, 2011 (North America)				
Phantom Kingdom Portable	Nippon Ichi Software					
Pinball Hall of Fame: The Gottlieb Collection	Crave Entertainment	September 30, 2009 (North America)				
Pinball Heroes	Sony Interactive Entertainment				December 20, 2022 (Europe)	December 20, 2022 (Europe)
Pipe Mania	Empire Interactive					
Pirates of the Caribbean: At World's End	Eurocom					
Pirates of the Caribbean: Dead Man's Chest	Griptonite Games, Amaze Entertainment					
PixelJunk Monsters Deluxe	Q-Games	September 30, 2009 (North America); October 1, 2009 (Europe); November 1, 2009 (Japan)				
Piyotama	SCEA	July 26, 2010 (North America)				
Planetarian: Chiisana Hoshi no Yume	Prototype					
Platypus	MumboJumbo	March 26, 2009 (North America)Withdrawn				
Plus Plumb 2 Again	Takuyo					
Pocket Pool	Hyper-Devbox	July 30, 2009 (North America)				
PoPoLoCrois	SCE					
Power Pro Success Legends	Konami					
Power Stone Collection	Capcom	September 24, 2009 (North America); November 26, 2009 (Europe); July 30, 2009 (Japan)				
PQ: Practical Intelligence Quotient	Now Production	September 18, 2008 (North America)Withdrawn; October 23, 2009 (Europe); July 30, 2009 (Japan)				
PQ2: Practical Intelligence Quotient 2	Now Production	October 16, 2008 (North America)Withdrawn				
Prince of Persia: Revelations	Pipeworks Software	September 30, 2009 (North America); April 30, 2009 (Europe); July 30, 2009 (Japan)				
Prince of Persia: Rival Swords	Ubisoft	September 30, 2009 (North America)				
Prince of Persia: The Forgotten Sands	Ubisoft	May 17, 2010 (North America)				
Princess Crown	Vanillaware					
Princess Frontier Portable	Alchemist					
Princess Maker 4 Portable	Cyber Front					
Princess Maker 5 Portable	Cyber Front					
Prinny: Can I Really Be the Hero?	Nippon Ichi Software	September 30, 2009 (North America); October 8, 2009 (Europe); November 21, 2009 (Japan)				
Prinny 2: Dawn of Operation Panties, Dood!	Nippon Ichi Software	January 10, 2011 (North America)				
Pro Evolution Soccer 2010	Konami					
Pro Evolution Soccer 2011	Konami	November 15, 2010 (North America)Withdrawn				
Pro Evolution Soccer 2012	Konami	December 19, 2011 (North America)Withdrawn				
Pro Yakyuu Spirits 2010	Konami					
Pro Yakyuu Spirits 2011	Konami					
Pursuit Force	Bigbig Studios	May 7, 2009 (North America); June 26, 2009 (Europe); July 30, 2009 (Japan)			May 16, 2023 (North America)	May 16, 2023 (North America)
Pursuit Force: Extreme Justice	Bigbig Studios	May 14, 2009 (North America); April 9, 2009 (Europe); July 30, 2009 (Japan)			August 15, 2023 (North America)	August 15, 2023 (North America)
Puzzle Chronicles	Konami	February 18, 2010 (North America)				
Puyo Puyo!!	Sega					
Puyo Puyo 7	Sega					
Puzzle Bobble Pocket	Taito					
Puzzle Challenge: Crosswords and More	Crave Entertainment	September 30, 2009 (North America)				
Puzzle Quest: Challenge of the Warlords	Vicious Cycle Software	September 25, 2008 (North America); October 23, 2008(Europe); July 30, 2009 (Japan)				
QIX++	Taito					
R-Type Tactics	Irem	October 22, 2009 (North America)Withdrawn				
R-Type Tactics II: Operation Bitter Chocolate	Irem					
Ragnarok: Hikari to Yami no Koujo	GungHo					
Ranshima Monogatari Rare Land Story: Shoujo no Yakujou	Arc System Works					
Rapala Pro Bass Fishing	Activision	September 27, 2010 (North America)Withdrawn				
Rapala Trophies	Activision	September 30, 2009 (North America)Withdrawn				
Ratchet & Clank: Size Matters	High Impact Games	April 23, 2009 (North America); March 19, 2009 (Europe); April 21, 2009 (Japan)				
Real Madrid: The Game	Virgin Play					
Reel Fishing: The Great Outdoors	Natsume Inc.	October 15, 2009 (North America)				
Remember11 ~The Age of Infinity~	Marvelous Entertainment					
Rengoku: The Tower of Purgatory	Hudson Soft	March 24, 2010 (North America)				
Rengoku 2: The Stairway to H.E.A.V.E.N	Hudson Soft	March 24, 2010 (North America)				
Resistance: Retribution	Bend Studio	September 30, 2009 (North America); March 19, 2009 (Europe); March 11, 2009 (Japan)				
Rezel Cross	SCE					
Ridge Racer	Namco Bandai	December 17, 2009 (North America)				
Ridge Racer 2	Bandai Namco Games				December 20, 2022 (Europe)	December 20, 2022 (Europe)
Riviera: The Promised Land	Sting Entertainment	October 22, 2009 (North America)				
Samurai Shodown Anthology	SNK	September 30, 2009 (North America)				
Samurai Warriors PSP the Best	Koei	January 1, 2011 (North America)				
Samurai Warriors: State of War	Omega Force	July 9, 2009 (North America)				
Sarugetchu: Pipo Saru Racer	h.a.n.d.					
Sarugetchu: SaruSaru Daisakusen	h.a.n.d.					
Savage Moon	FluffyLogic	December 22, 2009 (North America); December 22, 2009 (Europe); July 30, 2009 (Japan)				
Scrabble	Electronic Arts	September 30, 2009 (North America)Withdrawn				
Second Novel: Kanojo no Natsu, 15-Bun no Kioku	Nippon Ichi Software					
Secret Agent Clank	High Impact Games	September 30, 2009 (North America)				
Secret of Evangelion Portable	Cyber Front					
The Secret Saturdays: Beasts of the 5th Sun	High Voltage Software	October 22, 2009 (North America)Withdrawn				
Sega Genesis Collection	Sega	September 30, 2009 (North America); October 8, 2009 (Europe); July 30, 2009 (Japan)				
Sega Rally Revo	Sega	December 17, 2009 (North America)Withdrawn				
Sekai wa Atashi de Mawatteru: Hikari to Yami no Princess	Global A Entertainment					
Sengoku BASARA: Battle Heroes	Capcom					
Sengoku BASARA: Chronicle Heroes	Capcom					
Sengoku Efuda Yuugi: Hototogisu Ran	Irem					
Sengoku Efuda Yuugi: Hototogisu Tairan	Irem					
Senritsu no Stratus	Konami					
Shadow of Memories	Konami					
Shaun White Snowboarding	Ubisoft					
Shining Hearts	Sega					
Shinkyouku Soukai Polyphonica 0-4 Hanashi Full Pack	Prototype					
Shin Megami Tensei: Devil Summoner	Atlus					
Shin Megami Tensei: Persona	Atlus	September 30, 2009 (North America)				
Shin Megami Tensei: Persona 3 Portable	Atlus	July 5, 2010 (North America)				
Shin Sangoku Musou 2nd Evolution (PSP the Best)	Koei					
Shinobido Homura	Spike					
Shogi ga Tsuyokunaru: Gekishi - Jouseki Dojo (Mycom Best)	NCS					
Shogi World Champion: Gekisashi Portable	NCS					
Shutokou Battle: Zone of Control	Genki					
Shutsugeki! Otometachi no Senjou 2: Ikusabana no Kizuna	System Soft					
Sid Meier's Pirates!	Firaxis Games					
Silent Hill: Origins	Konami	December 10, 2009 (North America)				
Silent Hill: Shattered Memories	Konami	January 19, 2010 (North America)Withdrawn				
Simple 2000 Series Portable Vol.1: The Mahjong	D3 Publisher					
Simple 2500 Series Portable Vol.1: The Table Game	D3 Publisher					
Simple 2000 Series Portable Vol.2: The Shogi	D3 Publisher					
Simple 2500 Series Portable Vol. 2: The Tennis	D3 Publisher					
Simple 2500 Series Portable Vol. 3: The Dokodemo Suiri	D3 Publisher					
Simple 2500 Series Portable Vol. 6: The Tank	D3 Publisher					
Simple 2500 Series Portable Vol.8: The Dokodemo Gal Mahjong	D3 Publisher					
Simple 2500 Series Portable Vol. 9: The My Taxi	D3 Publisher					
Simple 2500 Series Portable Vol.12: The Hohei 2: Senyuu yo, Sakini Ike	D3 Publisher					
Simple 2500 Series Portable Vol. 13: The Akuma Hunters - Exorsister	D3 Publisher					
The Eye of Judgment: Legends	Sony Computer Entertainment	March 10, 2010 (North America)				
The Sims 2	Electronic Arts	September 30, 2009 (North America)Withdrawn; December 17, 2009 (Europe); July 30, 2009 (Japan)				
The Sims 2 Castaway	Electronic Arts	September 30, 2009 (North America)Withdrawn; January 7, 2009 (Europe); July 30, 2009 (Japan)				
The Sims 2 Pets	Electronic Arts	September 30, 2009 (North America)Withdrawn; December 10, 2009 (Europe); July 30, 2009 (Japan)				
Skate Park City	Midas Interactive					
Slotter Mania P: Mach Go Go Go III	Dorart					
Slotter Mania P: SanSan HanaHana & SanSan Oasis	Dorart					
SNK Arcade Classics Vol. 0	SNK Playmore					
SNK Arcade Classics Vol. 1	SNK Playmore	September 30, 2009 (North America)				
Snow Portable	Prototype					
SOCOM U.S. Navy SEALs: Fireteam Bravo	Zipper Interactive	December 19, 2007 (North America); March 19, 2009 (Europe); July 30, 2009 (Japan)				
SOCOM U.S. Navy SEALs: Fireteam Bravo 2	Zipper Interactive	June 5, 2008 (North America); May 7, 2009 (Europe); July 30, 2009 (Japan)				
SOCOM U.S. Navy SEALs: Fireteam Bravo 3	Zipper Interactive	February 18, 2010 (North America); February 25, 2010 (Europe); February 11, 2010 (Japan)				
SOCOM U.S. Navy SEALs: Tactical Strike	Slant Six Games	October 15, 2009 (North America)				
Solfege: Sweet Harmony	GungHo					
Sonic Rivals	Sega	September 30, 2009 (North America)				
Sonic Rivals 2	Sega	September 30, 2009 (North America); October 8, 2009 (Europe); July 30, 2009 (Japan)				
Soulcalibur: Broken Destiny	Namco	September 30, 2009 (North America)	February 9, 2012 (North America)		October 17, 2023 (North America)	October 17, 2023 (North America)
Split/Second	Disney Interactive	November 15, 2010 (North America)				
SpongeBob SquarePants: The Yellow Avenger	THQ	September 30, 2009 (North America)Withdrawn				
Star Trek: Tactical Assault	Quicksilver Software	July 17, 2008 (North America)Withdrawn				
Star Wars: Battlefront II	LucasArts	September 30, 2009 (North America)				
Star Wars Battlefront: Elite Squadron	LucasArts	November 5, 2009 (North America)				
Star Wars Battlefront: Renegade Squadron	LucasArts	September 30, 2009 (North America)				
Star Wars The Clone Wars: Republic Heroes	LucasArts	November 5, 2009 (North America)				
Star Wars: The Force Unleashed	LucasArts	September 30, 2009 (North America)				
StateShift	Engine Software	September 17, 2009 (North America)Withdrawn				
Steambot Chronicles: Battle Tournament	Irem	October 22, 2009 (North America)Withdrawn				
Street Fighter Alpha 3 MAX	Capcom	October 15, 2009 (North America); November 12, 2009 (Europe); July 30, 2009 (Japan)	February 9, 2012 (North America)			
Strikers 1945 Plus	PM Studios	July 30, 2009 (North America)				
Sudoku	Hudson Soft					
Suikoden I + II	Konami					
Super Collapse 3	MumboJumbo	April 9, 2009 (North America)				
Super Hind	Mountain Sheep					
Super Monkey Ball Adventure	Sega	September 30, 2009 (North America); October 29, 2009 (Europe); July 30, 2009 (Japan)				
Super Pocket Tennis	Essential Games	December 3, 2009 (North America)				
Super Stardust Portable	Housemarque	December 4, 2008 (North America)			June 23, 2022 (Europe)	June 23, 2022 (Europe)
SWAT: Target Liberty	Activision	September 30, 2009 (North America)				
Syphon Filter: Combat Ops	Bend Studio	November 20, 2007 (North America)Withdrawn				
Syphon Filter: Dark Mirror	Bend Studio	June 12, 2008 (North America)			March 21, 2023 (Europe)	March 21, 2023 (Europe)
Syphon Filter: Logan's Shadow	Bend Studio	October 9, 2008 (North America)	February 9, 2012 (North America)			
Tactics Ogre: Let Us Cling Together	Square Enix	February 2, 2011 (North America)				
Taiheiyou no Arashi: Senkan Yamato, Akatsuki ni Shutsugekisu	System Soft					
Taikou Risshiden IV	Koei					
Taikou Risshiden V	Tecmo Koei					
Taito Memories Pocket	Taito					
Tales of the World: Radiant Mythology 3	Bandai Namco					
Talkman Travel: Paris	Japan Studio	August 7, 2008 (North America)				
Talkman Travel: Rome	Japan Studio	August 7, 2008 (North America)				
Talkman Travel: Tokyo	Japan Studio	August 7, 2008 (North America)				
Tantei Jinguuji Saburo: Hai to Diamond	Arc System Works					
Tekken 6	Namco Bandai	November 24, 2009 (North America); December 11, 2009 (Europe); January 11, 2009 (Japan)			October 17, 2023 (North America)	October 17, 2023 (North America)
Tekken: Dark Resurrection	Namco Bandai					
Tenchi no Mon 2: Busouden	Japan Studio					
Tenchou no Igo	NCS					
Tenchu: Time of the Assassins	From Software					
The History Channel: Great Battles of Rome	Atomic Planet					
The Legend of Heroes: Trails from Zero	Falcom					
The Legend of Heroes: Trails in the Sky	Falcom	March 28, 2011 (North America)				
The Legend of Heroes: Trails in the Sky the 3rd	Falcom					
The Red Star	XS Games	March 17, 2010 (North America)				
The 3rd Birthday	Square-Enix	March 29, 2011 (North America); May 13, 2010 (Europe); December 21, 2010 (Japan)	February 9, 2012			
Thexder Neo	Square Enix	October 1, 2009 (North America); October 1, 2009 (Europe); October 1, 2009 (Japan)				
Thrillville: Off the Rails	LucasArts	September 30, 2009 (North America); December 22, 2009 (Europe); July 30, 2009 (Japan)				
Tiger Woods PGA Tour 09	EA Tiburon					
Tiger Woods PGA Tour 10	HB Studios	September 30, 2009 (North America)Withdrawn; July 3, 2009 (Europe); July 30, 2009 (Japan)				
Tir-Na-Nog	System Soft					
TMNT	Ubisoft Montreal	June 25, 2009 (North America)Withdrawn; June 25, 2009 (Europe); July 30, 2009 (Japan)				
TNA Impact!: Cross the Line	SouthPeak Games	June 21, 2010 (North America)Withdrawn				
TNT Racers	dtp Entertainment	February 14, 2011 (North America)				
Tokimeki Memorial 4	Konami					
Tokobot	Tecmo	December 18, 2008 (North America); June 4, 2009 (Europe); August 11, 2009 (Japan)				
Tokyo Mono Hara Shi: Karasu no Mori Gakuen Kitan	Atlus					
To Love Ru Trouble: Doki Doki! Rinkaigakkou-Hen	Marvelous Entertainment					
Tom Clancy's EndWar	Ubisoft Shanghai	September 30, 2009 (North America); January 22, 2009 (Europe); July 30, 2009 (Japan)	February 9, 2012 (North America)			
Tom Clancy's Ghost Recon Advanced Warfighter 2	High Voltage Software	June 18, 2009 (North America); February 5, 2009 (Europe); July 30, 2009 (Japan)				
Tom Clancy's Ghost Recon Predator	High Voltage Software	November 15, 2010 (North America)	February 9, 2012 (North America)			
Tom Clancy's Rainbow Six: Vegas	Ubisoft	September 30, 2009 (North America)				
Tom Clancy's Splinter Cell Essentials	Ubisoft Montreal	July 2, 2009 (North America); March 19, 2009 (Europe); July 30, 2009 (Japan)	February 9, 2012 (North America)			
Tomb Raider: Anniversary	Crystal Dynamics	July 23, 2009 (North America); July 16, 2009 (Europe); July 30, 2009 (Japan)				
Tomb Raider: Legend	Crystal Dynamics	July 23, 2009 (North America)	February 9, 2012 (North America)			
Toriko: Gourmet Survival	Bandai Namco Games					
Toy Story 3	Disney				September 20, 2022 (North America); September 20, 2022 (Europe)	September 20, 2022 (North America); September 20, 2022 (Europe)
Trick × Logic: Season 1	Chunsoft					
TRON: Evolution	Disney Interactive	December 6, 2010 (North America)				
Tsuyo Kiss 2 Portable	NetRevo					
Twisted Metal: Head-On	Incognito Entertainment	February 14, 2008 (North America); March 19, 2008 (Europe); July 30, 2009 (Japan)				
UFC Undisputed 2010	THQ	September 13, 2010 (North America)Withdrawn	February 9, 2012 (North America)			
Ultra Puzzle Bobble Pocket	Taito					
Ultimate Board Game Collection	Valcon Games	July 9, 2009 (North America)				
Ultimate Ghosts 'n Goblins	Capcom	January 15, 2009 (North America)				
Umewaza Ykari no Yasashi Igo	NCS					
Umineko no Naku Koro ni Portable 1	Alchemist					
Umineko no Naku Koro ni Portable 2	Alchemist					
Unbound Saga	Vogster	July 16, 2009 (North America); July 30, 2009 (Europe); July 30, 2009 (Japan)				
UnchainBlades ReXX	FuRyu					
Uncharted Waters 4: Rota Nova	Koei					
Undead Knights	Tecmo	October 22, 2009 (North America)				
UNO	Gameloft	April 21, 2010 (North America)Withdrawn				
Untold Legends: Brotherhood of the Blade	Sony Online Entertainment	September 25, 2008 (North America)				
Untold Legends: The Warrior's Code	Sony Online Entertainment	October 2, 2008 (North America)				
Valhalla Knights	Marvelous Entertainment	September 24, 2009 (North America); June 16, 2010 (Europe); August 11, 2010 (Japan)				
Valhalla Knights 2	Marvelous Entertainment	January 21, 2010 (North America)Withdrawn; February 4, 2010 (Europe); August 11, 2010 (Europe)				
Valhalla Knights 2 Battle Stance Best Collection	Marvelous Entertainment	May 21, 2010 (Japan)				
Valhalla Knights 2 PSP the Best	Marvelous Entertainment					
Valkyria Chronicles II	Sega	August 30, 2010 (North America)				
Valkyria Chronicles III: Unrecorded Chronicles	Sega					
Valkyria Chronicles III: Unrecorded Chronicles Extra Edition	Sega					
Vantage Master Portable (Falcom Super Price)	Falcom					
Venus & Braves: Majo to Megami to Horobi no Yogen	Bandai Namco Games					
Vertigo	Icon Games	March 15, 2011 (North America)				
Wangan Midnight Portable	Genki					
The Warriors	Rockstar	October 22, 2009 (North America); November 19, 2009 (Europe); July 30, 2009 (Japan)				
Warriors of the Lost Empire	Goshow	August 2, 2010 (North America)				
Warriors Orochi	Koei	August 20, 2009 (North America); August 20, 2009 (Europe); November 1, 2009 (Japan)				
Warriors Orochi 2	Koei	September 30, 2009 (North America); December 17, 2009 (Europe); July 30, 2009 (Japan)				
Warship Gunner 2 Portable	Tecmo Koei					
We Love Juggler	Kita Denshi					
What Did I Do To Deserve This, My Lord? 2	Acquire	May 3, 2010 (North America)				
White Knight Chronicles Episode Portable: Dogma Wars	Level-5					
Wild Arms XF	Media.Vision	September 10, 2009 (North America); August 20, 2009 (Europe); August 11, 2009 (Japan)				
Winning Post 6 2006	Koei					
Wipeout Pulse	Studio Liverpool	September 10, 2009 (North America); June 11, 2009 (Europe); July 30, 2009 (Japan)				
Wipeout Pure	Studio Liverpool	November 20, 2007 (North America); November 20, 2007 (Europe); September 21, 2007 (Japan)				
WTF: Work Time Fun	D3	October 2, 2008 (North America)Withdrawn				
World Neverland Olerud Okoku Monogatari & Pluto Kyouwakoku Monogatari 2 in 1 Portable	fonfun					
World of Pool	Icon Games					
World Soccer Winning Eleven 2012	Konami					
World Tour Soccer	London Studio					
Worms: Battle Islands	Team17	November 22, 2010 (North America)Withdrawn	February 9, 2012 (North America)			
WWE All Stars	THQ	March 28, 2011 (North America)Withdrawn				
WWE SmackDown vs. Raw 2009	THQ	September 30, 2009 (North America)Withdrawn	February 9, 2012 (North America)			
WWE SmackDown vs. Raw 2010	THQ	October 22, 2009 (North America)Withdrawn; October 22, 2009 (Europe); July 30, 2009 (Japan)				
WWE SmackDown vs. Raw 2011	THQ	October 25, 2010 (North America)Withdrawn				
WWII: Battle Over the Pacific	Midas Interactive Entertainment					
x-Radar Portable	SCEI					
Yarudora Portable: Double Cast	Sony Computer Entertainment					
Yarudora Portable: Kisetsu o Dakishimete	Sony Computer Entertainment					
Yarudora the explorer Portable: Yukiwari no Hana	Sony Computer Entertainment					
Yggdra Union	Sting Entertainment	October 22, 2009 (North America)				
Youkoso Hitsuji-Mura Portable	Success					
Ys Seven	Falcom	August 16, 2010 (North America) available (Europe); September 31, 2010 (Japan)				
Ys vs. Trails in the Sky	Falcom					
Ys VI: The Ark of Napishtim	Konami					
Ys: The Oath in Felghana	Falcom	November 1, 2010 (North America) available (Europe); April 21, 2010 (Japan)				
Ys I & II Chronicles	Falcom	February 2, 2011 (North America) available (Europe); September 31, 2010 (Japan)				
Yuusha no Kuse Ni Namaikida or2 PSP the Best	Acquire					
Yuusha 30 Second	Marvelous Entertainment					
Zero Pilot: Daisanji Sekai Taisen 1946	Global A Entertainment					
Zero Shiki: Kanjou Sentouki Ni	Global A Entertainment					
Z.H.P. Unlosing Ranger VS Darkdeath Evilman	Nippon Ichi Software	October 25, 2010 (North America)				
Zettai Zetsumei Toshi 3	Irem					
Zill O'll Infinite Plus (Koei Tecmo the Best)	Koei					
Zodiac	Hopemoon					
Zuma	PopCap Games	August 23, 2010 (North America)				
Zwei!! (Falcom Super Price)	Falcom					
