= Fun Labs =

Romanian video game developer

Fun Labs Romania SRL
- Type: Private
- Industry: Video games
- Founded: 1999; 27 years ago
- Headquarters: Bucharest, Romania
- Products: Cabela's series
- Parent: Maximum Entertainment (2023–present)
- Website: funlabs.com

Fun Labs Romania SRL is a Romanian video game developer based in Bucharest. Founded in 1999, it long worked with Activision on a multitude of projects, including several Cabela's games.

On March 14, 2023, the company was acquired by Maximum Entertainment.

== Games developed ==
year of release	title	platform
2001	Cabela's 4x4 Off-Road Adventure	PC
2001	Secret Service	PC
2002	Shadow Force: Razor Unit	PC
2002	Cabela's Big Game Hunter	(PlayStation 2)
2003	U.S. Most Wanted: Nowhere to Hide	PC
2003	Delta Ops: Army Special Forces	PC
2003	Cabela's 4x4 Off-Road Adventure 3	PC
2003	Revolution	PC
2003	Cabela's Big Game Hunter: 2004 Season	PC
2003	Cabela's Deer Hunt: 2004 Season	(Xbox, PlayStation 2)
2003	Cabela's Dangerous Hunts	(Xbox, PlayStation 2)
2004	Cabela's Big Game Hunter 2005 Adventures	(PC, Xbox, PlayStation 2)
2004	Rapala Pro Fishing	(PC, Xbox, PlayStation 2)
2005	Cabela's Deer Hunt: 2005 Season	(Xbox)
2005	Cabela's Big Game Hunter 2006 Trophy Season	(PC)
2005	Cabela's Outdoor Adventures	(GameCube, PlayStation 2, Xbox)
2005	Cabela's Dangerous Hunts 2	(PC, GameCube, Xbox, PlayStation 2)
2005	SeaWorld: Shamu's Deep Sea Adventures	(PC, GameCube, Xbox)
2006	Cabela's Dangerous Hunts: Ultimate Challenge	(PlayStation Portable)
2006	Cabela's Alaskan Adventures	(PC, PlayStation 2, Xbox 360)
2006	Rapala Trophies	(PlayStation Portable)
2006	Harley-Davidson: Race to the Rally	(PC, PlayStation 2)
2006	Cabela's African Safari	(PC, PlayStation 2, PlayStation Portable, Xbox 360)
2006	Rapala Tournament Fishing	(Xbox 360, Wii)
2007	Cabela's Trophy Bucks	(Wii, PlayStation 2, Xbox 360)
2007	Cabela's Big Game Hunter	(Wii, PlayStation 2, Xbox 360)
2007	Cabela's Monster Bass	(PlayStation 2)
2007	The History Channel: Battle for the Pacific	(Wii, PlayStation 2)
2008	Rapala Fishing Frenzy 2009	(Wii, PlayStation 3, Xbox 360)
2008	Cabela's Dangerous Hunts 2009	(Wii, PlayStation 2, PlayStation 3, Xbox 360)
2008	Championship Paintball 2009	(Wii, PlayStation 2, PlayStation 3, Xbox 360)
2008	Cabela's Legendary Adventures	(Wii, PlayStation 2, PlayStation Portable)
2009	Cabela's Outdoor Adventures	(PC, Wii, PlayStation 2, PlayStation 3, Xbox 360)
2009	Chaotic: Shadow Warriors	(Wii, PlayStation 3, Xbox 360)
2010	Cabela's Monster Buck Hunter	(Wii)
2010	Cabela's North American Adventures	(PlayStation 2, PlayStation 3, PlayStation Portable, Wii, Xbox 360)
2010	Rapala Pro Bass Fishing	(PlayStation 2, PlayStation 3, PlayStation Portable, Wii, Xbox 360)
2011	Cabela's Survival: Shadows of Katmai	(PlayStation 3, Wii, Xbox 360)
2012	MIB: Alien Crisis	(PlayStation 3, Wii, Xbox 360)
2012	Cabela's Hunting Expeditions	(PlayStation 3, Wii, Xbox 360, PC)
2013	Angry Birds Trilogy	(Wii, Wii U)
2013	Cabela's African Adventures	(PC, PlayStation 3, PlayStation 4, Wii, Xbox 360, Xbox One)
2014	Duck Dynasty	(PC, PlayStation 3, PlayStation 4, Xbox 360, Xbox One)
2015	Prototype: Biohazard Bundle	(PlayStation 4, Xbox One)
2015	Tony Hawk's Pro Skater 5	(PlayStation 3, Xbox 360)
2020	Stranded Deep	(PlayStation 4, Xbox One)
2020	Unturned	(PlayStation 4, Xbox One, Xbox Series X/S)
2021	Open Country	(PC, PlayStation 4, Xbox One, Xbox Series X/S)
2021	Nerf Legends	(PC, PlayStation 4, PlayStation 5, Xbox One, Xbox Series X/S)
