= Rapala Fishing Frenzy 2009 =

2008 video game

- Developer(s): Fun Labs (Xbox 360); Magic Wand Productions (Wii); Sand Grain Studios (PS3)
- Publisher(s): Activision
- Platform(s): PlayStation 3, Xbox 360, Wii
- Release: Xbox 360: NA: September 2, 2008; EU: October 17, 2008; AU: March 4, 2009; PlayStation 3: NA: September 2, 2008; EU: November 21, 2008; AU: March 4, 2009; Wii: NA: September 2, 2008; EU: October 17, 2008; AU: December 3, 2008
- Genre(s): Sports
- Mode(s): Single-player

Rapala Fishing Frenzy 2009 is a fishing video game developed by Fun Labs. It is the sequel to Rapala Tournament Fishing and was released by Activision for the Xbox 360, PlayStation 3 and Wii on September 2, 2008. The Wii version is known as simply Rapala's Fishing Frenzy.
