= Nerf Legends =

2021 video game

- Developer: Fun Labs
- Publisher: GameMill Entertainment
- Series: Nerf
- Engine: Unreal Engine 4
- Platforms: Microsoft Windows; Nintendo Switch; PlayStation 4; PlayStation 5; Xbox One; Xbox Series X/S
- Release: 19 November 2021
- Genre: First-person shooter
- Modes: Single-player, multiplayer

Nerf Legends is a first-person shooter video game developed by Fun Labs and published by GameMill Entertainment. It was released on 19 November 2021 for Microsoft Windows, Nintendo Switch, PlayStation 4, PlayStation 5, Xbox One, and Xbox Series X/S.

== Gameplay ==
Nerf Legends has a single-player mode, featuring Nerf battles against robots, as well online multiplayer which features both eight-person free-for-all and four-person platoon matches. Players are able to customize their icon and the color of their blasters. They can use 15 Nerf blasters from the Mega, Ultra and Elite lines with special ammunition such as pull darts, push darts, seeker darts, and slow darts.

== Development ==
The game was announced on 11 August 2021. A trailer for the game was released the same day.

The game was delisted from digital storefronts on 31 December 2024.

== Reception ==
Reception

Review score
| Publication | Score |
|---|---|
| IGN | 2/10 |

Nerf Legends received mostly negative reviews from critics. IGN's Travis Northup gave for Nerf Legends a 2/10, summarizing it as "a broken, painful slog that you shouldn't even consider playing as a joke."

Writing for TechRaptor, Lee Mehr gave the game a 1.5/10, stating that it had "copious technical faults showing it was rushed to market, unexciting shooting mechanics, repetitive to its core, egregious up-front cost, and on and on and on it goes."

Alexandre Galvão of GameBlast wrote, "It wouldn't even be worth it if it was free to play," and gave the game a 1/10.
