= Cabela's Survival: Shadows of Katmai =

2011 video game

- Developer: Fun Labs
- Publisher: Activision
- Platforms: PlayStation 3, Wii, Xbox 360
- Release: NA: November 1, 2011; EU: November 18, 2011
- Genres: Action-adventure, survival
- Mode: Single-player

Cabela's Survival: Shadows of Katmai is a 2011 action-adventure video game developed by Fun Labs and published by Activision for the PlayStation 3, Xbox 360 and Wii. It was part of the Cabela's series of video games.

== Plot ==
The game begins with pilot Logan James lying in the snow after his plane crashed near the summit of Silverback Mountain in Alaska during a terrible blizzard. He fends off a pack of wolves and climbs around the mountain to find shelter. After being rescued by Native Jay “Jonah” Silverfox, Logan sets off to find the plane’s other occupant, Doctor Karen West, and her mysterious cargo that was meant to be delivered to Jenner Station.

He eventually finds Karen nearly frozen to death. While she warms up in a moose carcass, Logan finds her backpack and learns that it contains vaccines for a deadly virus affecting the mountain’s locals, including Jonah. When Karen wakes up, Logan takes her back to Jonah’s cabin where she cures Jonah. Logan believes he can use the mines inside the Mountain to take a shortcut to Jenner Station. Before he sets off, Jonah tells Logan to beware an evil spirit that inhabits the mountain known as the Chatchka.

With Jonah’s dog Togo, Logan finds a way into the mines. While searching for a way out of the mountain, the two face the Chatchka, a monstrous grizzly bear. Logan fights it off and uses dynamite to blow open an exit. The Chatchka catches up with them, but Logan tricks it into falling down a chasm. Logan and Togo ride down to Jenner Station on a sled and deliver the supplies. All the residents are cured and Logan starts a romantic relationship with Karen.

== Reception ==
For the Xbox 360 version, Official Xbox Magazine gave it a 5/10, startled "the game can easily be finished in an afternoon, leaving hunting fans wondering why they wasted it playing a lackluster action-adventure game." Destructoid gave it 4.5/10 as "The one thing that it so desperately needs -- entertainment value -- is sorely lacking in areas where it shouldn't, ultimately dragging the title down to the pit of forgotten titles."

For the PlayStation 3 version, PlayStation Official Magazine UK gave it a 6/10, saying "The whole package is, of course, fugly and cheap. But whether it's surprisingly enjoyable dogsledding sections or physics gaffes that often see dead animals inadvertently do the splits, I had a smile on my face throughout." And Push Square gave it a 4/10, as what it said "Shadows of Katmai looked to be an exciting new entry in the Cabela's franchise, but it instead finds itself trekking directly into uncharted territory without the necessary finesse and polish it needs to withstand its high profile competition – a far cry from the niche genre the Cabela's series is known and enjoyed for."
