= Secret Service (2001 video game) =

- Cover art by Michel Bohbot
- Developer: Fun Labs
- Publisher: Activision Value
- Platform: Microsoft Windows
- Release: November 26, 2001
- Genre: Tactical shooter
- Modes: Single-player, Multiplayer

Secret Service is a budget first-person tactical shooter video game released in 2001. The title's disclaimer states that it is in no way affiliated with or approved by the United States Secret Service.

== Premise ==
The player is an American Secret Service agent who must complete 16 single-player missions. The players start out as a rookie protecting government officials. As they gain experience from completing the operations, they will be assigned higher profile missions. The final mission is protecting the president of the United States.

== Gameplay ==
Secret Service is a first-person tactical shooter, similar to the Rainbow Six computer game series. Players must progress through a mission while accomplishing various mission objectives, such as eliminating terrorists or protecting dignitaries.

The combat in Secret Service is slightly more forgiving than in many other tactical shooters, as the player can survive several bullet hits before dying (assuming they are equipped with heavy body armor), as opposed to dying after only 1 or 2 shots like in many other tactical shooters.

The player's weapon is displayed in-game, unlike the earlier games in the Rainbow Six or Ghost Recon series. The game also features ragdoll physics.

Before each mission, the player is able to prepare by selecting equipment (such as firearms or body armor), or positioning agents at various strategic locations within a map. The player is unable to pre-plan attack routes, however, and must navigate teammates during a mission in real-time.

On most missions, players can be assisted by several computer-controlled Secret Service agents. There are two different types of Secret Service agents: teammates and static agents. Teammates are members of the player's fire team; the player leads them directly through a level, and issue them commands (such as attack or defend) using an in-game menu. Static agents are agents whom the player positions at various strategic locations within a mission during the mission preparation phase. The player has slightly less control over these agents, although they can still be issued in-game orders. The main purpose of static agents is to guard specific areas or serve as stationary snipers.

== Synopsis ==
The game begins in the Middle East, where the player is part of a protection detail for an American dignitary traveling through the region. The player must protect the dignitary from various attacks by local insurgents.

After a few missions, the player returns to the United States, where they stumble upon a plot by major arms dealers to sell off 4 chemical weapons bombs to various terrorist groups. The game's remaining missions revolve around tracking down the arms dealers, as well as preventing the terrorist groups from using the chemical bombs against major targets.

The game ends with a couple major missions. In one mission, the player must escort the Vice President out of a large hotel that is being attacked by every terrorist group the player had previously defeated. In the game's last major mission, terrorists detonate 2 of the chemical bombs in the Presidential subway system, forcing the player to escape with the U.S. president on foot through the Washington D.C. sewer system, where they are attacked by heavily armed commandos.

In the game's epilogue, the player is invited to a party at the White House, where they end up saving the President once again, this time from a lone gunman.

== Reception ==
GameSpot rated the game 6.7 out of 10 and said that it "has a lot of potential that's hampered by sloppy execution".
