= Cabela's GrandSlam Hunting: 2004 Trophies =

2003 video game

- Developer: nFusion Interactive
- Publisher: Activision Value
- Platform: Windows
- Release: 2003
- Genre: Sports

Cabela's GrandSlam Hunting: 2004 Trophies is the first sequel to Cabela's GrandSlam Hunting: North American 29. It was developed by American studio nFusion Interactive and released in 2003.

The game was published by Activision Value, in conjunction with hunting supply company Cabela's.
