= Cabela's Dangerous Hunts: Ultimate Challenge =

2006 video game

- North American box art
- Developers: Sand Grain Studios; Fun Labs
- Publisher: Activision
- Series: Dangerous Hunts
- Platform: PlayStation Portable
- Release: NA: April 4, 2006; AU: March 21, 2007
- Genre: Sports
- Mode: Single-player

Cabela's Dangerous Hunts: Ultimate Challenge is the first of the Cabela's games to be released on PlayStation Portable. It is a port of Cabela's Dangerous Hunts 2, with the addition of some new features. The game was co-developed by Sand Grain Studios and Fun Labs, and published by Activision, in conjunction with hunting supply company Cabela's. It was released on April 4, 2006, in North America and on March 21, 2007, in Australia.

== Gameplay ==
The game is similar to the second game, with the addition of a Quick Action Mode and including two new animals: the Burchell's zebra and African wild dog (though under protection). The game modes are: Quick Hunt, Action Zone, and Career. The player's objective is to hunt and track deadly animals like bears, leopards, rhinos and cape buffalos, among others.
