= Shamu's Deep Sea Adventures =

2005 video game

- PAL region cover art
- Developer: Fun Labs
- Publisher: Activision
- Platforms: Game Boy Advance, GameCube, Nintendo DS, PlayStation 2, Xbox
- Release: November 1, 2005: GCN; NA: November 1, 2005; EU: March 16, 2006 PS2, XB; NA: November 1, 2005; AU: February 2, 2006; EU: March 17, 2006 GBA, NDS; NA: November 08, 2005; AU: February 01, 2006; EU: March 17, 2006
- Genre: action
- Mode: single-player

Shamu's Deep Sea Adventures is a video game linked to SeaWorld's popular Shamu orca shows. The game was released in November 2005 and is available for GameCube, Game Boy Advance, Nintendo DS, PlayStation 2, and Xbox.

== Story ==
In the game, Poseidon, the Greek god of the sea, tries to destroy the SeaWorld theme park and replace it with Atlantis. The player controls Shamu, the titular protagonist, who attempts to defeat Poseidon and the Kraken. Shamu collects power ups and performs various feats over 20 levels and 8 environments.

== Reception ==
Reception

Aggregate score
Aggregator	Score			
Aggregator	DS	GameCube	PS2	Xbox
Metacritic	30/100	48/100	66/100	55/100

Review scores
Publication	Score			
Publication	DS	GameCube	PS2	Xbox
GameZone	N/A	N/A	6.8/10	N/A
PlayStation Official Magazine – UK	N/A	N/A	7/10	N/A
TeamXbox	N/A	N/A	N/A	7/10
CiN Weekly	N/A	61/100	61/100	61/100

The PlayStation 2 and Xbox versions received "mixed" reviews, while the GameCube and DS versions received "unfavorable" reviews, according to the review aggregation website Metacritic.

Xbox Advanced said, "Shamu’s Deep Sea Adventures is just flat out a bad game. Being a budget title does not save this game or excuse any of its shortcomings, as so many of today’s budget titles for kids are actually very good". The video game columnist for CiN Weekly said the game is "a cute marketing vehicle that is too difficult and underdeveloped for its target audience".
