= Cabela's Dangerous Hunts 2009 =

2009 video game

- North American Xbox 360 cover art
- Developers: Fun Labs (Xbox 360); Magic Wand Productions (Wii); Sand Grain Studios (PS2 and PS3)
- Publisher: Activision
- Platforms: PlayStation 2, PlayStation 3, Wii, Xbox 360
- Release: NA: September 23, 2008
- Genre: Sports
- Mode: Single-player

Cabela's Dangerous Hunts 2009 (known as Cabela's Dangerous Adventures in the PAL region) is a hunting video game published by Activision for the PlayStation 2, PlayStation 3, Wii and Xbox 360 game consoles. It was released in the United States on September 23, 2008.

== Plot ==
Hunter Flint Abrahams is hunting red deer in Russia with his friend and mentor Sergei. The two are attacked by a brown bear and Sergei is killed. After Flint manages to fight off the bear, he decides to hunt dangerous and large game.

Flint travels to Tanzania to hunt lions with his friend Henry Tally. Henry shows off a large male he killed, and Flint bets he can take down a bigger one. He uses impala meat to lure the largest male. After he kills it, Flint receives a distress call from Henry. Lions have attacked his camp and Flint returns to protect the workers inside.

Flint then heads to Alaska and tracks down a brown bear with the help of a ranger. When he tries to take it down, an avalanche occurs. Narrowly escaping, Flint hurries back to the ranger's cabin to make sure he's alright. He finds him buried under the snow and the bear wandering nearby. Flint kills the bear and rescues the ranger.

Flint's journey continues towards Ecuador, in search of a jaguar. While Flint is hunting, he sees a plane crash and hurries in its direction. He rescues a woman from the burning wreckage of the plane. She tells him that her husband Rodrigo is still somewhere in the jungle. Flint gives her his handgun and goes in search of Rodrigo. He finds Rodrigo about to be attacked by a jaguar. Flint kills the jaguar and saves the man's life.

The Government of India calls on Flint to help cull the striped hyena population following attacks on children. During this job he gets a lift from a convoy of forest rangers who are relocating tigers. During the journey, boulders fall on a truck and four tigers escape. Flint takes them down with a tranquilizer gun and brings them back safely.

Flint hunts a cougar in British Columbia and later joins Henry Tally and Daniel Heath in the Congo to hunt Cape buffalo. During their journey they have to fend off Nile crocodiles and hippos on a river. Flint manages to take down a Cape buffalo. However, he immediately discovers that Henry and Daniel are stuck up in trees with a large herd of buffalo at the bottom. Flint kills the buffalo and frees his friends.

Next, Flint heads to Thailand where he has to tranquilize Asian black bears and put transmitters on them. The next destination is Namibia, where Flint goes on a leopard hunt with Dominic Rousseau. Dominic is injured by a leopard after which Flint carries him towards their truck. However, the truck is totaled by a rhinoceros. Flint kills the rhino and goes in search of help. Flint has to sneak past a herd of African elephants and kill a scar-faced leopard before he finally arrives at a village.

Finally, Flint returns to Russia to hunt wolves with Sergei's son Yuri. Some wolves escape into the forest, where Yuri's car cannot reach. Flint insists on going in alone. After the last group of wolves is killed, the bear responsible for Sergei's death reappears. Flint kills the animal, bringing closure to his mentor's death.

== Hunting animals ==
There are a total of 32 animals in the game. Not every type of animal can be hunted. Of the animals that can be hunted, some animals, especially predators, will attack if the player gets too close. Other animals, such as deer, will run away if they hear, see or smell the player.

=== Mammals ===
- Red deer
- Brown bear
- Lion
- Spotted hyena
- Wolf
- Cougar
- Moose
- Jaguar
- Tiger
- Gaur
- African rhino
- Impala
- Leopard
- African elephant
- Striped hyena
- Grizzly bear
- Elk
- Wild boar
- Cape buffalo
- Hippopotamus
- Giant forest hog
- Asian black bear
- Indian elephant
- Capybara

=== Reptiles ===
- Black caiman
- Nile crocodile
- Python
- Snake
- Anaconda

=== Others ===
- Bee
- Red-bellied piranha
- Vulture

== Reception ==
Reception

Aggregate score
| Aggregator | Score | | |
| Aggregator | PS3 | Wii | Xbox 360 |
|---|---|---|---|
| Metacritic | 39/100 | | 42/100 |

Review scores
| Publication | Score | | |
| Publication | PS3 | Wii | Xbox 360 |
|---|---|---|---|
| GamesRadar+ | 1.5/5 | | 1.5/5 |
| IGN | 5.2/10 | 4.8/10 | 5.2/10 |
| Jeuxvideo.com | 14/20 | | 14/20 |

IGN gave the game a 5.2/10, giving mediocre marks for its novelty appeal, but reported for the Xbox 360 version, "... it has very little lasting appeal and is definitely a better rental than a purchase." IGN gave the Wii version a lower score by a point, citing the poor control scheme that was implemented.
