= Cabela's Deer Hunt: 2005 Season =

2004 video game

- Developers: Sand Grain Studios (PS2); Magic Wand Productions (PC); Fun Labs (Xbox)
- Publisher: Activision Value
- Platforms: PlayStation 2, Windows, Xbox
- Release: August 31, 2004
- Genre: Sports

Cabela's Deer Hunt: 2005 Season is the first sequel to Cabela's Deer Hunt: 2004 Season. It was developed by Sand Grain Studios (PlayStation 2), Magic Wand Productions (Windows) and Fun Labs (Xbox) and released on August 31, 2004 by Activision Value in conjunction with hunting supply company Cabela's.
