= Cabela's 4x4 Off-Road Adventure =

2001 video game series

- Cover art
- Developer(s): Fun Labs
- Publisher(s): Activision Value
- Platform(s): Microsoft Windows
- Release: February 2001
- Genre(s): Racing

Cabela's 4x4 Off-Road Adventure is a series of three racing video games published by Activision Value in conjunction with hunting supply company Cabela's.

== Games ==
=== Off-Road Adventure ===
The first game to be released in the series was the titular Cabela's 4x4 Off-Road Adventure. It was developed by Fun Labs and released February 2001. The game was published on the PC by Activision in conjunction with hunting supply company Cabela's.

IGN called the game "a diamond in the rough that's slowly puttering down the long, hard, road towards respectability." They rated the game 6/10 (passable).

=== Off-Road Adventure 2 ===
Cabela's 4x4 Off-Road Adventure 2 was the second game in the series. It was developed by Clever's Software Development and published by Activision on November 13, 2001, for the PC.

GameSpot said of the PC version, "Off-road Adventure 2 is unlike virtually any previous driving game in that it does not force you to compete against other cars or a constantly ticking clock." They rated the game 7.0/10 (good).

=== Off-Road Adventure 3 ===
The third and final game of the series, Cabela's 4x4 Off-Road Adventure 3, was developed by Fun Labs and published on the PC by Activision in March 2003. It was the first game in the Cabela's 4x4 Off-Road Adventure series that was rated "Teen" by the ESRB.

Reviews were generally mixed. GameSpot said of the PC version, "Cabela's 4x4 Off-Road Adventure 3 is simply too quirky, too slow-paced, and too repetitious to be enjoyable for most racing fans." They rated the game 5.7/10 (mediocre).
