= Rapala Tournament Fishing =

2006 video game

- Developers: Fun Labs (Xbox 360); Magic Wand Productions (Wii)
- Publisher: Activision
- Platforms: Wii; Xbox 360
- Release: NA: November 22, 2006 (Wii); EU: March 16, 2007; AU: March 21, 2007; NA: April 10, 2007 (X360)
- Genre: Sports
- Mode: Single Player

Rapala Tournament Fishing is a fishing video game developed by Fun Labs and Magic Wand Productions and sponsored by Rapala. It was released by Activision on Wii and Xbox 360 in 2006-2007.

== Critical reaction ==
Reception

Aggregate score
Aggregator	Score	
Aggregator	Wii	Xbox 360
Metacritic	41/100	41/100

Review scores
Publication	Score	
Publication	Wii	Xbox 360
EP Daily	5/10	N/A
Eurogamer	3/10	N/A
GameSpot	4.5/10	N/A
IGN	3/10	4.5/10
Jeuxvideo.com	9/20	N/A
NGamer	50%	N/A
Official Xbox Magazine (US)	N/A	4/10

The game received "unfavorable" reviews according to the review aggregation website Metacritic. GameSpot criticized the Wii version's unresponsive controls, unchallenging nature of the fish themselves, graphical quirks and inappropriate force feedback. However, the pleasant music and inclusion of a wide variety of fishing equipment were highlighted as good features. IGN also described the gameplay of the same console version as "nearly broken".
