= Cabela's Outdoor Adventures (2005 video game) =

2005 video game

- North American cover art
- Developers: Sand Grain Studios (PS2); Fun Labs (Xbox); Magic Wand Productions (Win, GC)
- Publishers: NA: Activision Value; EU: Zoo Digital Publishing
- Platforms: GameCube, PlayStation 2, Windows, Xbox
- Release: September 13, 2005: GameCube; NA: September 13, 2005 PS2, XB; NA: September 13, 2005; PAL: March 17, 2006 Windows; NA: March 7, 2006
- Genre: Simulation
- Mode: Single-player

Cabela's Outdoor Adventures is a hunting video game released in 2005 by Activision Value.

== Gameplay ==
The game gives a player the ability to drive vehicles, fish, and hunt. There are 11 locations, 32 animals to hunt and harvest, and several thousand Cabela's gear options. Some of the animals in the game include white-tailed deer, mule deer, brown bear, black bear, moose, coyote, bobcat, lynx, javelina, and raccoon. There are animals in the game that will attack you including bobcats, wolves, bears, lynx, coyotes, and moose.

Open Season allows to go right into the hunt with random gear in order to complete the authorized bag limit for deer. The players can also choose the difficulty of the hunt to test out the capabilities. They include Greenhorn (Easy), Sportsmen (Medium), and Simulation (Hard).

== Reception ==
The game received mostly positive reviews from critics, who praised it for its gameplay, graphics, sound, value, and animal behaviors, but it was criticized for the human designs and movements.
