= Cabela's Big Game Hunter: 2004 Season =

2003 video game

- Developer: Sand Grain Studios
- Publisher: Activision Value
- Platform: Microsoft Windows
- Release: September 2003
- Genre: Sports

Cabela's Big Game Hunter: 2004 Season is the sixth sequel to the original Cabela's Big Game Hunter. It was developed by Sand Grain Studios and released in September 2003. The game was published by Activision Value, in conjunction with hunting supply company Cabela's.

== Synopsis ==
Cabela's Big Game Hunter 2004 Season is an open-world hunting game. It consists of eight maps across North America, 26 big-game mammals to hunt, and a large variety of firearms, bows, pistols, clothing, and equipment. The player embarks on a career hunt to bag each game mammal and complete each location. The player receives cash for each trophy bagged and uses the money to buy tags and additional weapons and equipment as needed. Upon completing the career hunt, the player will watch a compilation of pre-recorded game footage set to the theme music. In the movie library folder on the main menu, the player will unlock five pre-recorded demos of hunts done by the developers. The locations shown in the demos are British Columbia, Alaska, Montana, Quebec, and Texas.

== Gameplay ==
The player can choose three game modes to play from: Quick Hunt, Career Hunt, and Multiplayer.

The player must equip a set of clothing, no more than two firearms, and at least one tag - no greater than one tag per species per hunt. Weapons do not need to be sighted and ammunition is infinite. Upon spawning at one of the four preset spawn points to each location, the player will see a brief visual. A screenshot of the location in the season they have selected will be shown, along with the location name in a banner at the bottom of the screen. The compass will spin as the level loads, and the player can observe the game logo.

In easy and medium difficulty modes, the player has the option of using the trophy beacons – red dots that pinpoint an animal's location regardless of distance. In hard difficulty, the dots are off and are locked to that setting. The player can also choose to use the bullet camera – a slow motion camera lock on the bullet or arrow as it travels its trajectory once the player takes a shot. The bullet camera will only follow the bullet/arrow if it travels a distance greater than several feet. The bullet camera is advantageous for seeing the size and scope of the map, various distances required to trek, as well as what animals correspond to which dots.

The player will always spawn at the beginning of hunting hours with clear skies at the exact location they have selected, as well as by a cabin and within walking distance of a vehicle. The player cannot choose to spawn at any location other than the four preset starting points, and they cannot choose the weather and time at which they begin hunting.

Game spawns throughout each map in random quantities each hunt. No less than the minimum amount of game per level will spawn, and usually no more than 12–15 animals will spawn per level. Any animal bagged will respawn shortly after the player bags it. Lower spawn rate often requires the player to notice which dots respawn, especially when hunting multiples of the same species. Some game may spawn near the player as the player loads the level. If the player spawns next to a hostile species, there is a chance the player can be attacked while spawning in.

When the player wades into water deeper than waist-level, they will begin to swim. The same controls for walking and running on land apply. However, the player cannot use any items while in the water. If the player drives their vehicle into water, they cannot retrieve it without restarting the hunt.

The player will only take damage from overextending themselves physically, being attacked by a hostile animal, drowning, or crashing their vehicle. The player cannot take fall damage. The player can also not be damaged by cacti or other map assets. The player cannot take damage from falling into water.

Any objects used by the player, besides the weapons, are not actually shown being used, even in third-person. Food, water, tactical equipment, calls, and lures are not shown in the player's hands being used. Stock audio is played and an effect is given. Only weapons, ground blinds, tents, tree stands, and tripods are shown being used, but they do not require actual setup. There are no animations for players embarking or disembarking vehicles, or setting up tents and equipment.

== Reception ==
Reception

Review scores
Publication	Score
AllGame	3/5
7Wolf Magazine	7.9/10
GameZone	7/10
PC Gamer	62/100

Cabela's Big Game Hunter 2004 Season received mixed reviews.
