= Cabela's African Safari =

2006 video game

- PC cover art
- Developers: Fun Labs (X360); Magic Wand Productions (PC); Sand Grain Studios (PS2, PSP)
- Publisher: Activision Value
- Platforms: PlayStation 2; PlayStation Portable; Windows; Xbox 360
- Release: NA: October 17, 2006; AU: March 21, 2007
- Genre: Sports
- Modes: Single-player, multiplayer

Cabela's African Safari is a 2006 hunting simulation video game played from a third-person perspective. It was released for Microsoft Windows, PlayStation 2, PlayStation Portable and Xbox 360.

== Gameplay ==
The player can track and stalk a variety of animals on a safari over five or six African countries (depending on the version). The game has many huntable animals such as leopards, elephants, rhinoceroses, cheetahs, cape buffalo, lions, and a variety of other animals.

== Release ==
The game was published by Activision Value, in conjunction with hunting supply company Cabela's. It was the second Cabela's game to be released on the Xbox 360 and third on the PSP.

== Critical reception ==
Xbox Achievements thought the game was decent but did not try to push the genre or the series in any meaningful way. IGN felt that the PC and PS2 versions were better than the Xbox 360 version, which was severely lacking.
