= Cabela's Dangerous Hunts 2 =

2005 video game

- North American cover art
- Developers: Sand Grain Studios (PS2); Magic Wand Productions (Windows, GC); Fun Labs (Xbox)
- Publishers: Activision; Zoo Digital Publishing
- Platforms: PlayStation 2, Xbox, GameCube, Windows
- Release: PS2, XB, GCN: NA: November 15, 2005; AU: March 2006; WIN: NA: November 24, 2005; EU: November 24, 2005
- Genre: Simulation
- Mode: Single-player

Cabela's Dangerous Hunts 2 is a 2005 hunting video game published Activision for PlayStation 2, Xbox, GameCube, and Microsoft Windows. It is a sequel to the 2003 game Cabela's Dangerous Hunts.

== Gameplay ==
As opposed to previous games, Cabela's Dangerous Hunts 2 is more focused on survival rather than hunting. The player takes the role of a famous hunter traveling through many different types of terrain, trying to find out who or what killed his best friend. As with the first game, the hunter has a limited amount of energy and can be injured, which results in failure. There are many weapons, including handguns, rifles, shotguns, knives and machetes. The game also includes many different animals including a boss, the Yeti. Unlike the first game, this one has only the story mode. During the plot, the player is supposed to shoot all 80 stumps in order to unlock a "surprise": cheat codes for unlimited ammunition and infinite energy.

== Plot ==
The game begins in Alaska, where a hunter named Cole meets a man named Hugh Andrews. Hugh is a native with a glass eye and a wooden leg. He has important information about the player's old friend, "Bullseye" Bill Lewis. Cole helps him rescue his niece and nephew from a grizzly bear.

Cole then progresses to Zimbabwe seeking Bullseye, where he crash lands with pilot Abby Pendleton in the bush. After finding shelter, Cole hikes to a radio tower to send an SOS. Later, Cole meets native Hamisi, who agrees to take him to a poachers nearby camp, led by former partner Dimitri Benedik. Hamisi was with Bullseye when the incident happened but cannot remember much about it. A poacher frightens some elephants by firing a shotgun. Cole has to tranquilize them from the back of a truck before they get to Hamisi's village.

Cole follows Benedik to India and tranquilizes tigers with Reginald Dowling, who works for Wilderness Rescue, an organization that protects communities from dangerous animals. Reginald is then told to get back to the campsite, where an Asian black bear is on the rampage and must be tranquilized before it kills someone else. Later, Reginald tells Cole he can take him to an Australian aboriginal named Wirake to recruit as a guide, but they must first rescue a missing child. After finding the child, Cole encounters an Indian rhinoceros and tranquilizes it.

Reginald takes Cole to Australia to meet Wirake, who tells them that some of his tribesman are lost in the bush. Cole rescues them from crocodiles and escorts them back to the village while dodging stampeding scrub bulls. Next, Cole and Reginald are lost after falling into a cave and must fight off dingoes while escaping. With Wirake as their guide, Cole fights pumas and wild boars to escape from some Argentinian ruins. After some time, Wirake notes that Reginald has disappeared. He had been chased off by a puma, and Cole rescues him.

Progressing to Siberia, Cole meets up with Benedek and his poachers, who are killed by a giant polar bear named Big Grimm, the animal believed to have killed Bullseye. Cole kills both Grimm and the actual beast that killed Bullseye, a Yeti. Reginald and Wirake congratulate Cole on avenging his friend. Just when Reginald thinks they can finally have a vacation, he gets a call from Wilderness Rescue about an anaconda attack.

== Reception ==
Reception

Aggregate score
Aggregator	Score			
Aggregator	GameCube	PC	PS2	Xbox
Metacritic	51/100	66/100	64/100	63/100

Review scores
Publication	Score			
Publication	GameCube	PC	PS2	Xbox
GameZone	N/A	N/A	N/A	6.2/10
IGN	6.3/10	N/A	6.1/10	6.4/10
Nintendo Power	2.5/10	N/A	N/A	N/A
TeamXbox	N/A	N/A	N/A	5.1/10

The game received "mixed or average reviews" on all platforms according to video game review aggregator Metacritic.
