= Cabela's Deer Hunt: 2004 Season =

2003 video game

- Developers: Sand Grain Studios (PS2); Fun Labs (Xbox)
- Publisher: Activision
- Platforms: PlayStation 2, Xbox
- Release: August 26, 2003
- Genre: Sports

Cabela's Deer Hunt: 2004 Season is a 2003 hunting video game developed by Sand Grain Studios and Fun Labs and was released on August 26, 2003 for PlayStation 2 and Xbox. It is the first video game to be released in the Deer Hunt series. The game was published by Activision in conjunction with hunting supply company Cabela's. There was a PlayStation 2 Greatest Hits release of the same game called Cabela's Deer Hunt: Season Opener.

The Xbox version of the game has online leaderboard support via Xbox Live which was available to players until the shutdown of the service on April 15, 2010. Cabela's Deer Hunt: 2004 Season is now supported online again on the replacement online servers called Insignia.

== Gameplay ==
The game mostly revolves around hunting down and killing different species of deer in large, mountainous environments. There are several ways to hunt down the deer, including using a tree stand and waiting for them, tracking it down by examining its footprints, and by using callers and feeders to lure them to the player.

== Reception ==
Reception

Review score
Publication	Score
IGN	7.4/10

Cabela's Deer Hunt: 2004 Season received mixed reviews. David Clayman of IGN gave it a score of 7.4/10. Lexington Herald-Leader said "If you don't hunt yourself, steer clear of this game".
