= Cabela's Dangerous Hunts =

2003 video game

- PlayStation 2 cover art
- Developers: Fun Labs (PC, Xbox); Sand Grain Studios (PS2)
- Publisher: Activision Value: EU: Zoo Digital Publishing
- Platforms: PlayStation 2 Xbox; Microsoft Windows
- Release: November 11, 2003: PlayStation 2 & Xbox; NA: November 11, 2003; AU: September 3, 2004; EU: October 1, 2004 Windows; NA: February 5, 2004
- Genres: Hunting, simulation, first-person shooter

Cabela's Dangerous Hunts is a 2003 video game published by Activision in conjunction with Cabela's for PlayStation 2, Xbox and Microsoft Windows.

== Gameplay ==
Cabela's Dangerous Hunts is a first-person shooter where the player goes on hunting trips. The game features several game modes, such as Career Mode, which allows the player to create a profile and customize their stats, age, and appearance. There are many events which may result in a failed hunt: penalties for killing non-game animals, including a failure if three are killed; falling into deep streams can result in drowning; falling off high ledges can result in injury or death; and certain animals, such as bears, cape buffalos, wolves, coyotes, hyenas, mountain lions, and leopards, can attack and kill the player. The player also has an energy limit, eventually, causing tiredness and the need to slow down. This effect can be reduced by carrying lighter equipment and conserving energy.

There are twelve exotic locations which feature twenty-six animals. There are a variety of game, with white rhinoceros, zebras, and hyenas being more challenging than deer, elk, and wolves, and of weaponry: eleven types of rifles, three types of handguns, two types of bows, one type of crossbow, and three hunting knives. Items like scent removers and different animal calls can be used to attract the animals, while ground blinds and tree stands can camouflage the player.

The game also features the game-mode Action Zone, containing different stages for hunting. Once in these zones, the player's aim is to kill several animals, thereby passing the level. Once all the predators are taken down, a portal will appear to take the player to the next location.

Locations in the game include Wisconsin, Alaska, Quebec, California, Idaho, New Mexico, Alberta, and Tanzania. Each location houses different animals that the player can hunt. The player has the ability to change the season and area of the hunt, and, in Career Hunt Mode, they can choose between different, uniquely-perked characters.

The Xbox version of the game has online leaderboard support via Xbox Live which was available to players until April 15, 2010. Cabela's Dangerous Hunts is now supported online again on the replacement online servers called Insignia.

== Reception ==
Reception

Aggregate score
Aggregator	Score		
Aggregator	PC	PS2	Xbox
Metacritic	68/100	57/100	49/100

Review scores
Publication	Score		
Publication	PC	PS2	Xbox
Game Informer	N/A	4.75/10	N/A
GameSpot	6.8/10	N/A	N/A
GameSpy	3/5	N/A	N/A
GameZone	6.5/10	8/10	N/A
IGN	N/A	6.8/10	N/A
Official U.S. PlayStation Magazine	N/A	2.5/5	N/A
Official Xbox Magazine (UK)	N/A	N/A	3/10
PC Gamer (US)	61%	N/A	N/A
PlayStation: The Official Magazine	N/A	6/10	N/A
TeamXbox	N/A	N/A	6.8/10

The PC and PlayStation 2 versions received "mixed or average reviews", while the Xbox version received "generally unfavorable reviews", according to video game review aggregator Metacritic. The game was said to have "passable" gameplay and a very neat feel to it. It is featured in the PlayStation 2's Greatest Hits series.
