= Index of Windows games (C) =

This is an index of Microsoft Windows games.

This list has been split into multiple pages. Please use the Table of Contents to browse it.

Title	Released	Developer	Publisher
C-evo	1999	Steffen Gerlach	
Cabal Online	2005	ESTsoft Corp.	OGPlanet, Moliyo, Games-Masters, Asiasoft Online, E-Games
Cabela's 4x4 Off-Road Adventure	2001	Fun Labs	Activision Publishing, Inc.
Cabela's African Safari	2006	Magic Wand Productions	Activision Value
Cabela's Alaskan Adventures	2006	Magic Wand Productions	Activision
Cabela's Big Game Hunter	1998	Elsinore Multimedia	HeadGames Publishing, Inc.
Cabela's Big Game Hunter II	1998	HeadGames Publishing, Inc.	HeadGames Publishing, Inc.
Cabela's Big Game Hunter III	1999	HeadGames Publishing	HeadGames Publishing
Cabela's Big Game Hunter 4	2000	Elsinore Multimedia Inc.	Activision
Cabela's Big Game Hunter 5: Platinum Series	2001	Elsinore Multimedia Inc.	Activision
Cabela's Big Game Hunter 6	2002	nFusion Interactive LLC	Activision Value Publishing
Cabela's Big Game Hunter: 2004 Season	2003	Sand Grain Studios	Activision Publishing, Inc.
Cabela's Big Game Hunter 2005 Adventures	2004	Magic Wand Productions	Activision Value, Zoo Digital Publishing
Cabela's Big Game Hunter 2006 Trophy Season	2005	Magic Wand Productions	Activision Value
Cabela's Dangerous Hunts	2003	Fun Labs	Activision Value
Cabela's Dangerous Hunts 2	2005	Magic Wand Productions	Activision, Zoo Digital Publishing
Cabela's Deer Hunt: 2005 Season	2004	Magic Wand Productions	Activision
Cabela's GrandSlam Hunting: 2004 Trophies	2003	nFusion Interactive	Activision Publishing, Inc.
Cabela's Outdoor Adventures	2005	Magic Wand Productions	Activision, Zoo Digital Publishing
Cabela's Outdoor Trivia Challenge	1999	Elsinore Multimedia Inc.	HeadGames Publishing, Inc.
Cabela's Sportsman's Challenge	1997	Diversions Software, Inc	HeadGames Publishing, Inc.
Cabela's Ultimate Deer Hunt	2001	nFusion Interactive	Activision Publishing, Inc.
Cabela's Ultimate Deer Hunt 2	2002	Sylum Entertainment, Ltd.	Activision Publishing, Inc.
Caesar II	1995	Impressions Games	Sierra Entertainment
Caesar III	1998	Impressions Games	Sierra Entertainment
Caesar IV	2006	Tilted Mill Entertainment	Sierra Entertainment
Cafe Little Wish	2003	Patissier	Digital Works, Patissier
Call for Heroes: Pompolic Wars	2007	Quotix Software	Strategy First
Call of Cthulhu	2018	Cyanide	Focus Home Interactive
Call of Cthulhu: Dark Corners of the Earth	2005	Headfirst Productions	Bethesda Softworks
Call of Duty	2003	Infinity Ward	Activision
Call of Duty 2	2005	Infinity Ward	Activision
Call of Duty 4: Modern Warfare	2007	Infinity Ward	Activision
Call of Duty: Advanced Warfare	2014	Sledgehammer Games	Activision
Call of Duty: Black Ops	2010	Treyarch	Activision
Call of Duty: Black Ops 4	2018	Treyarch	Activision
Call of Duty: Black Ops 6	2024	Treyarch, Raven Software	Activision
Call of Duty: Black Ops Cold War	2020	Treyarch, Raven Software	Activision
Call of Duty: Black Ops II	2012	Treyarch	Activision
Call of Duty: Black Ops III	2015	Treyarch	Activision
Call of Duty: Ghosts	2013	Infinity Ward	Activision
Call of Duty: Infinite Warfare	2016	Infinity Ward	Activision
Call of Duty: Modern Warfare	2019	Infinity Ward	Activision
Call of Duty: Modern Warfare 2	2009	Infinity Ward	Activision
Call of Duty: Modern Warfare 3	2011	Infinity Ward, Sledgehammer Games	Activision
Call of Duty: Modern Warfare II	2022	Infinity Ward	Activision
Call of Duty: Modern Warfare III	2023	Sledgehammer Games	Activision
Call of Duty: United Offensive	2004	Gray Matter Studios	Activision, Aspyr
Call of Duty: Vanguard	2021	Sledgehammer Games	Activision
Call of Duty: World at War	2008	Treyarch Invention, LLC	Activision
Call of Duty: WWII	2017	Sledgehammer Games	Activision
Call of Juarez	2006	Techland	Ubisoft
Call of Juarez: Bound in Blood	2009	Techland	Ubisoft
Call of Juarez: The Cartel	2011	Techland	Ubisoft
Call of Juarez: Gunslinger	2013	Techland	Ubisoft
Call of the Sea	2020	Out of the Blue	Raw Fury
Call to Power II	2000	Activision	Activision
The Callisto Protocol	2022	Striking Distance Studios	Krafton
The Cameron Files: Pharaoh's Curse	2002	Galilea	The Adventure Company
The Cameron Files: Secret at Loch Ness	2001	Galilea	Wanadoo Edition
Canary	2000	Front Wing	Front Wing
Candy Crush Saga	2015	King	King
Canvas: Sepia-iro no Motif	2000	Cocktail Soft, F&C FC01	F&C
Capitalism II	2001	Enlight	Ubisoft
Captain Quazar	1996	Cyclone Studios, 3DO	3DO
Captain Tsubasa: Rise of New Champions	2020	Tamsoft	Bandai Namco Entertainment
Car Tycoon	2003	Vectorcom Development	Fishtank Interactive
Caravel DROD	2002	Caravel Games	Caravel Games
Carmageddon	1997	Stainless Software Ltd.	SCi Games Ltd.
Carmageddon II: Carpocalypse Now	1998	Stainless Software Ltd.	SCi Games Ltd.
Carmageddon TDR 2000	2000	Torus Games	SCi, Xicat Interactive, Inc.
Carmen Sandiego's ThinkQuick Challenge	1999	The Learning Company	The Learning Company
CarneyVale: Showtime	2010	Singapore-MIT GAMBIT Game Lab	Microsoft Game Studios
Carnivores	1998	Action Forms	WizardWorks
Carnivores 2	1999	Action Forms	WizardWorks
Carnivores: Cityscape	2002	Sunstorm Interactive	Infogrames
Carnivores: Ice Age	2001	Action Forms	WizardWorks
Carrier Command: Gaea Mission	2012	Bohemia Interactive	Bohemia Interactive
Carrion	2020	Phobia Game Studio	Devolver Digital
Cars	2006	Beenox	THQ
Cars Mater-National Championship	2007	Rainbow Studios	THQ
Cars: Radiator Springs Adventures	2006	Beenox	THQ
Casino Mogul	2002	Monte Cristo	DreamCatcher Interactive
Casino Tycoon	2001	Cat Daddy Games	Monte Cristo, Davilex Games
Casino, Inc.	2003	Hothouse Creations	Konami
Castle of Shikigami III	2006	Alfa System, SKONEC	Cyberfront Corporation
Castle Shikigami 2	2003	Alfa System	MediaQuest
Castle Strike	2004	Related Designs	Data Becker, Witt Interactive Studios
CastleStorm	2013	Zen Studios	Zen Studios
Castlevania	2002	Konami	Konami
Castlevania: Lords of Shadow	2013	MercurySteam, Kojima Productions	Konami
Castlevania: Lords of Shadow 2	2014	MercurySteam	Konami
Castlevania: Lords of Shadow – Mirror of Fate	2014	MercurySteam	Konami
Cat Girl Alliance	2004	Sekilala	CD Bros., G-Collection
Cat Quest	2017	The Gentlebros	PQube
Cat Quest II	2019	The Gentlebros	PQube
Caterpillar Construction Tycoon	2005	Gabriel Entertainment	Activision Value
Catwoman	2004	Argonaut Games	Electronic Arts
Caucasus: Nanatsuki no Nie	2009	Innocent Grey	Innocent Grey
Cave Story	2004	Studio Pixel	Studio Pixel
Celebrity Deathmatch	2003	Big Ape Productions	Gotham Games
CellFactor: Revolution	2007	Immersion Games, Timeline Interactive, Artificial Studios	Immersion Games, Timeline Interactive, Artificial Studios
Centipede	1998	Atari, Leaping Lizard	Hasbro Interactive
Ceville	2009	Realmforge Studios	Kalypso Media
Chained Together	2024	Anegar Games	Anegar Games
Championship Manager 3	1999	Sports Interactive	Eidos
Championship Manager: Season 99/00	1999	Sports Interactive	Eidos
Championship Manager: Season 00/01	2000	Sports Interactive	Eidos
Championship Manager: Season 01/02	2001	Sports Interactive	Eidos
Championship Manager Quiz	2001	King of the Jungle Ltd.	Eidos Interactive
Championship Manager 4	2003	Sports Interactive	Eidos Interactive
Championship Manager: Season 03/04	2003	Sports Interactive	Eidos Interactive
Championship Manager 5	2005	Beautiful Game Studios	Eidos Interactive
Championship Manager 2006	2006	Beautiful Game Studios	Eidos Interactive
Championship Manager 2007	2006	Beautiful Game Studios	Eidos Interactive
Championship Manager 2008	2007	Beautiful Game Studios	Eidos Interactive
Chaos;Child	2016	5pb.	5pb.
Chaos;Head	2008	5pb., Nitroplus	Nitroplus
Chaos League	2004	Cyanide	Digital Jesters
Chaos Legion	2003	Capcom Production Studio 6	Capcom
Chaos Overlords	1996	Stick Man Games	New World Computing
Chaos Reborn	2015	Snapshot Games	Snapshot Games
Chariots of War	2003	Slitherine Software	Strategy First
Charlie and the Chocolate Factory	2005	High Voltage Software	Global Star Software
Charlotte's Web	2006	Backbone Entertainment	Sega
Chaser	2003	Cauldron HQ	JoWooD Productions
Chasing Static	2021	Headware Games	Ratalaika Games
Chernobylite	2021	The Farm 51	All in! Games SA
Cherry Petals Fall Like Teardrops	2002	BasiL	BasiL
Chess Mates	1997	Stepping Stone	Brainstorm
Chess Ultra	2017	Ripstone	Ripstone
The Chessmaster 4000 Turbo	1993	The Software Toolworks	The Software Toolworks
Chessmaster 5000	1996	Mindscape	Mindscape
Chessmaster 5500	1997	Mindscape	Mindscape
Chessmaster 6000	1998	Mindscape	Mindscape
Chessmaster 7000	1999	Mindscape	Mindscape
Chessmaster 8000	2000	Mattel Interactive	Mattel Interactive
Chessmaster 9000	2002	Ubisoft	Ubisoft
Chessmaster 10th Edition	2004	Ubisoft	Ubisoft
Chessmaster: Grandmaster Edition	2007	Ubisoft	Ubisoft
Chex Quest	1996	Digital Café	General Mills
Chicago 1930	2003	Spellbound Entertainment	Wanadoo Edition
Chicken Little	2005	Avalanche Software	Buena Vista Games
Chicken Run	2000	Blitz Games	Eidos Interactive
Chicken Shoot	2000	Toontraxx	Zuxxez/TopWare Interactive
Chicory: A Colorful Tale	2020	Greg Lobanov	
Chinese Paladin 3	2003	Softstar Technology (Shanghai) Co.	Softstar Entertainment
Chocolate Castle	2007	Lexaloffle	Lexaloffle
Chocolatier	2007	Big Splash Games LLC	PlayFirst
Chocolatier: Decadence by Design	2009	Big Fish Games	PlayFirst
Chorus	2021	Fishlabs	Deep Silver
Chris Sawyer's Locomotion	2004	Chris Sawyer	Atari
Chrome	2003	Techland	Strategy First
The Chronicles of Narnia: Prince Caspian	2008	Traveller's Tales	Disney Interactive Studios
The Chronicles of Narnia: The Lion, the Witch and the Wardrobe	2005	Traveller's Tales	Buena Vista Games
The Chronicles of Riddick: Assault on Dark Athena	2009	Starbreeze Studios	Atari
The Chronicles of Riddick: Escape from Butcher Bay	2004	Starbreeze Studios	Vivendi Games
The Chronicles of Spellborn	2008	Spellborn International	Frogster Interactive
Chrono Resurrection	2004	Resurrection Games	Resurrection Games
Chronos: Before the Ashes	2020	Gunfire Games	THQ Nordic
Chuchel	2018	Amanita Design	Amanita Design
Chuzzle	2005	Raptisoft Games	PopCap Games
CID The Dummy	2009	Oxygen Games	Oxygen Games
Cities XL	2009	Monte Cristo	Monte Cristo
City Life	2006	Monte Cristo	CDV
City of Heroes	2004	Cryptic Studios	NCsoft
CivCity: Rome	2006	Firefly Studios, Firaxis	2K Games
Civilization II	1996	MicroProse	MicroProse
Civilization II: Test of Time	1999	MicroProse	Hasbro Interactive
Civilization III	2001	Firaxis Games	Infogrames
Civilization III: Conquests	2003	BreakAway Games	Atari
Civilization III: Play the World	2002	Firaxis	Atari
Civilization IV	2005	Firaxis Games	2K Games, Aspyr
Civilization IV: Beyond the Sword	2007	Firaxis Games	Take Two Interactive
Civilization IV: Colonization	2008	Firaxis	2K Games
Civilization IV: Warlords	2006	Firaxis Games	Take Two Interactive
Civilization V	2010	Firaxis Games	2K Games
Civilization VI	2016	Firaxis Games	2K
Civilization VII	2025	Firaxis Games	2K
Civilization: Beyond Earth	2014	Firaxis Games	2K
Civilization: Call to Power	1999	Activision	Activision
Clan Lord	1998	Delta Tao Software	Delta Tao Software
Clandestiny	1996	Trilobyte	Virgin Games
Clash: Artifacts of Chaos	2023	ACE Team	Nacon
Claw	1997	Takarajimasha	Monolith Productions
Clive Barker's Jericho	2007	MercurySteam	Codemasters
Clive Barker's Undying	2001	DreamWorks Interactive	Electronic Arts
Clock Tower	1997	Human Entertainment	Human Entertainment
Clonk	2005	RedWolf Design	
Close Combat	1996	Atomic Games	Microsoft
Close Combat III: The Russian Front	1998	Atomic Games	Microsoft Game Studios
Close Combat: A Bridge Too Far	1997	Atomic Games	Microsoft
Close Combat: First to Fight	2005	Destineer	2K Games
Close Combat: Marines	2004	Atomic Games	
Close to the Sun	2019	Storm in a Teacup	Wired Productions
Closure	2012	Eyebrow Interactive	Eyebrow Interactive
Cloud	2005	USC Interactive Media Division	USC Interactive Media Division
Cloudheim	2026	Noodle Cat Games	Noodle Cat Games
Cloudpunk	2020	Ion Lands	Maple Whispering Limited
Cloudy with a Chance of Meatballs	2009	Ubisoft Shanghai	Ubisoft
Clover Heart's	2003	ALcot	
The Club	2008	Bizarre Creations	Sega
Clue	1998	Engineering Animation, Inc.	Hasbro Interactive
Clustertruck	2016	Landfall Games	Landfall Games
Cocoto Kart Racer	2005	Neko Entertainment	BigBen Interactive, Conspiracy Entertainment
Cocoto Platform Jumper	2004	Neko Entertainment	BigBen Interactive
Codename Eagle	1999	Refraction Games	Take 2 Interactive
Codename: Outbreak	2001	GSC Game World	Virgin Interactive
Codename: Panzers	2004	StormRegion	CDV
Coffee Tycoon	2005	Jamopolis Interactive	Reflexive Arcade
Cold Fear	2005	Darkworks	Ubisoft
Cold War	2005	Mindware Studios	DreamCatcher Games
Colin McRae Rally	1998	Codemasters	Codemasters
Colin McRae Rally 04	2003	Codemasters	Codemasters
Colin McRae Rally 2.0	2000	Codemasters	Codemasters
Colin McRae Rally 3	2002	Codemasters	Codemasters
Colin McRae Rally 2005	2004	Codemasters	Codemasters
Colin McRae: Dirt	2007	Codemasters	Codemasters
Colin McRae: Dirt 2	2009	Codemasters	Codemasters
Collapse	2008	Creoteam	Buka Entertainment
College Slam	1996	Iguana Entertainment	Acclaim
Comanche 3	1997	NovaLogic, Inc.	NovaLogic, Inc.
Comanche 4	2001	NovaLogic, Inc.	Electronic Arts, Inc.
Combat Chess	1997	Minds Eye Productions	Empire Interactive
Combat Flight Simulator 2	2000	Microsoft Game Studios	Microsoft
Combat Flight Simulator 3: Battle for Europe	2002	Microsoft Game Studios	Microsoft
Combat Mission II: Barbarossa to Berlin	2002	battlefront.com	CDV
Combat Mission 3: Afrika Korps	2003	battlefront.com	CDV
Combat Mission: Beyond Overlord	2000	battlefront.com	CDV
Combat Mission: Shock Force	2007	battlefront.com	Paradox Interactive
Command & Conquer	1997	Westwood Studios	Virgin Interactive
Command & Conquer 3: Kane's Wrath	2008	EA Los Angeles	Electronic Arts
Command & Conquer 3: Tiberium Wars	2007	EA Los Angeles	Electronic Arts
Command & Conquer 4: Tiberian Twilight	2010	EA Los Angeles	Electronic Arts
Command & Conquer: Generals	2003	EA Pacific	EA Games
Command & Conquer: Generals – Zero Hour	2003	EA Los Angeles	EA Games
Command & Conquer: Red Alert	1996	Westwood Studios	Virgin Interactive
Command & Conquer: Red Alert 2	2000	Westwood Pacific	EA Games
Command & Conquer: Red Alert 3	2008	EA Los Angeles	Electronic Arts
Command & Conquer: Red Alert 3 – Uprising	2009	EA Los Angeles	Electronic Arts
Command & Conquer: Renegade	2002	Westwood Studios	EA Games
Command & Conquer: Tiberian Sun	1999	Westwood Studios	EA Games
Command & Conquer: Yuri's Revenge	2001	Westwood Pacific	EA Games
Commander – Europe at War	2006	Slitherine Software	Matrix Games
Commander in Chief	2008	Eversim	Interactive Gaming Software
Commandos 2: Men of Courage	2001	Pyro Studios	Eidos Interactive
Commandos 3: Destination Berlin	2003	Pyro Studios	Eidos Interactive
Commandos: Behind Enemy Lines	1998	Pyro Studios	Eidos Interactive
Commandos: Strike Force	2006	Pyro Studios	Eidos Interactive
Company of Heroes	2006	Relic Entertainment	THQ
Company of Heroes: Opposing Fronts	2007	Relic Entertainment	THQ
Company of Heroes: Tales of Valor	2009	Relic Entertainment	THQ
Conan	2004	Cauldron HQ	TDK Mediactive
Conan Exiles	2018	Funcom	Funcom
Conarium	2017	Zoetrope Interactive	Iceberg Interactive
Condemned: Criminal Origins	2005	Monolith Productions	Sega
Conflict Zone	2001	MASA Group	Ubisoft
Conflict: Desert Storm	2002	Pivotal Games	SCi
Conflict: Desert Storm II	2003	Pivotal Games	SCi, Gotham Games
Conflict: Global Terror	2005	Pivotal Games	SCi
Conflict: Vietnam	2004	Pivotal Games	SCi
Conqueror A.D. 1086	1995	Software Sorcery	Sierra On-Line
Conquest: Frontier Wars	2001	Fever Pitch Studios	Ubisoft
Consortium	2014	Interdimensional Games	Interdimensional Games
Conspiracies	2002	Anima Interactive	Microsoft
Constantine	2005	Bits Studios	SCi Games, THQ
Construction-Destruction	2003	Gabriel Entertainment	ValuSoft
Constructor	1997	System 3	Acclaim
The Continuum	1997	Seven Lights	Seven Lights
Contra	2002	Konami	Konami
Contract J.A.C.K.	2003	Monolith Productions	VU Games
Contrast	2013	Compulsion Games	Focus Home Interactive
Control	2019	Remedy Entertainment	505 Games
Cookie's Bustle	1999	Rodik	Rodik
Cops 2170: The Power of Law	2004	MiST Land South	Russobit-M
The Corporate Machine	2001	Stardock	Take-Two Interactive
Corpse Killer	2019	Digital Pictures	Digital Pictures
Corsairs: Conquest at Sea	1999	Microids	Microids
Cosmic Osmo's Hex Isle	2007	Cyan Worlds	Fanista
Cossacks 3	2016	GSC Game World	GSC Game World
Cossacks II: Napoleonic Wars	2005	GSC Game World	CDV
Cossacks: European Wars	2000	GSC Game World	CDV
Costume Quest	2011	Double Fine Productions	The Adventure Company
The Council	2018	Big Bad Wolf	Focus Home Interactive
Counter-Strike	1999	Valve	Vivendi Universal
Counter-Strike Online	2008	Nexon Corporation	Valve
Counter-Strike: Condition Zero	2004	Valve	Vivendi Universal
Counter-Strike: Source	2004	Valve	Valve
Crab Game	2021	Dani	Dani
Cracking the Conspiracy	1998	Pixel Shop Inc.	Pixel Shop Inc.
Cradle	2015	Flying Cafe for Semianimals	Flying Cafe for Semianimals
Crashday	2006	Replay Studios, Moon Byte Studios, Atari	Atari
Crazy Machines	2005	FAKT Software	Novitas Publishing
Crazy Machines 2	2007	Fakt Software	Viva Media
Crazy Taxi	1999	Hitmaker, Strangelite	Sega, Acclaim, Activision
Crazy Taxi 3: High Roller	2002	Hitmaker	Sega
Creaks	2020	Amanita Design	Amanita Design
Creatures 2	1998	Creature Labs	Mindscape
Creatures 3	1999	Creature Labs	Mindscape
The Creed	1999	Insomnia Entertainment	Midas Interactive
Cricket 97	1997	Beam Software	Electronic Arts
Cricket 2000	1999	Creative Assembly Ltd.	Electronic Arts
Cricket 07	2006	HB Studios	EA Sports
Crime Boss: Rockay City	2023	Ingame Studios	505 Games
Crime Cities	2000	Techland	EON Digital Entertainment
Crime Life: Gang Wars	2005	Hothouse Creations	Konami
CrimeCraft	2009	Vogster Entertainment	THQ Inc.
Criminal Minds	2012	Legacy Games	Legacy Games
Crimson Skies	2000	Zipper Interactive	Microsoft Game Studios
Crimsonland	2003	10tons Entertainment	Reflexive Entertainment
Croc 2	1999	Argonaut Software	Fox Interactive
Croc: Legend of the Gobbos	1997	Argonaut Software	Fox Interactive
Cross Racing Championship 2005	2005	Invictus Games	Invictus Games, Take 2 Interactive
Crossfire: Legion	2022	Blackbird Interactive	Plaion, Smilegate
Crown Wars: The Black Prince	2024	Artefacts Studio	Nacon
Cruelty Squad	2021	Consumer Softproducts	Consumer Softproducts
Crusader Kings	2004	Paradox Development Studio	PAN Vision AB, Koch Media, Paradox Interactive
Crusader Kings II	2012	Paradox Development Studio	Paradox Interactive
Crusader Kings III	2020	Paradox Development Studio	Paradox Interactive
Crusaders of Might and Magic	1999	3DO	3DO
Cry of Fear	2012	Team Psykskallar	Team Psykskallar
Crying Is Not Enough	2018	Storyline Team	Storyline Team
Crying Suns	2019	Alt Shift	Humble Bundle
Cryostasis: Sleep of Reason	2008	Action Forms	505 Games, Aspyr, Zoo Corporation
Crypt of the NecroDancer	2015	Brace Yourself Games	Klei Entertainment
Cryptmaster	2024	Paul Hart, Lee Williams	Akupara Games
Crysis	2007	Crytek	Electronic Arts
Crysis 2	2011	Crytek	Electronic Arts
Crysis 3	2013	Crytek	Electronic Arts
Crysis Warhead	2008	Crytek Budapest	Electronic Arts
The Crystal Key	1999	Earthlight Productions	DreamCatcher Interactive
Crystal Crisis	2019	Nicalis	Nicalis
CSI: 3 Dimensions of Murder	2006	Telltale Games	Ubisoft
CSI: Crime Scene Investigation	2003	369 Interactive	Ubisoft
CSI: Dark Motives	2004	369 Interactive	Ubisoft
CSI: Hard Evidence	2007	Telltale Games	Ubisoft
CSI: Miami	2004	369 Interactive	Ubisoft
CSI: NY	2008	Legacy Interactive	Ubisoft
Cuban Missile Crisis: The Aftermath	2005	G5 Software	1C Company, Black Bean, Strategy First
Cube	2005	Wouter van Oortmerssen	
Cube 2: Sauerbraten	2004	Wouter van Oortmerssen, Lee Salzman, Mike Dysart, Robert Pointon, Quinton Reeves	
Culpa Innata	2007	Momentum AS	Strategy First
Cuphead	2017	StudioMDHR	StudioMDHR
Curious George	2006	Monkey Bar Games	Namco
The Curse of Monkey Island	1997	LucasArts	LucasArts
Curse of the Dead Gods	2021	Passtech Games	Focus Home Interactive
Curse: The Eye of Isis	2003	Asylum Entertainment	DreamCatcher Interactive
The Cursed Crusade	2011	Kylotonn	DTP Entertainment, Atlus USA
Cursed Mountain	2010	Deep Silver	Deep Silver
Cute Knight	2005	Hanako Games	iWin
Cutthroats: Terror on the High Seas	1999	Hothouse Creations	Eidos Interactive
Cyber Groove	2000	Front Fareast Industrial Corporation	Front Fareast Industrial Corporation
Cyberpunk 2077	2020	CD Projekt Red	CD Projekt
CyberStorm 2: Corporate Wars	1998	Dynamix	Sierra Entertainment
CyberStrike 2	1998	Simutronics Corporation	989 Studios
The Cycle: Frontier	2022	Yager Development	Yager Development
