= List of Activision Value games =

This is a list of games produced by Activision Value, an American video game publisher.

== List ==
Title	Platform(s)	Release date	Developer(s)	Ref.
In the Line of Duty: Firefighter	Microsoft Windows	November 2000	Mekada	
Cabela's Big Game Hunter 4	Microsoft Windows	2000	Elsinore Studio	
Fast Food Tycoon	Microsoft Windows	2000	Software 2000	
Gearhead Garage: The Virtual Mechanic	Microsoft Windows	2000	Ratloop	
Ski Resort Tycoon	Microsoft Windows	2000	Cat Daddy Games	
Cabela's 4x4 Off-Road Adventure	Microsoft Windows	February 2001	Fun Labs	
Golf Resort Tycoon	Microsoft Windows	June 1, 2001	Cat Daddy Games	
Sega Bass Fishing	Microsoft Windows	June 2001	Sims	
Survival: The Ultimate Challenge	Microsoft Windows	August 28, 2001	Techland	
Cabela's Ultimate Deer Hunt	Microsoft Windows	August 31, 2001	NFusion Interactive	
Ski Resort Tycoon II	Microsoft Windows	October 7, 2001	Cat Daddy Games	
Fast Food Tycoon 2	Microsoft Windows	October 9, 2001	Software 2000 / Proline Software	
Shrek: Game Land Activity Center	Microsoft Windows	October 23, 2001	ImageBuilder Software	
Alcatraz: Prison Escape	Microsoft Windows	October 30, 2001	Zombie Studios	
Cabela's 4x4 Off-Road Adventure 2	Microsoft Windows	November 2001	Clever's Games	
Secret Service: In Harm's Way	Microsoft Windows	November 2001	Fun Labs	
Pearl Harbor: Attack! Attack!	Microsoft Windows	2001	Asylum Games	
The House of the Dead 2	Microsoft Windows	2001	Wow Entertainment	
Shadow Force: Razor Unit	Microsoft Windows	February 25, 2002	Fun Labs	
Golf Resort Tycoon II	Microsoft Windows	February 27, 2002	Cat Daddy Games	
Hundred Swords	Microsoft Windows	February 2002	Smilebit	
F.D.N.Y. Firefighter: American Hero	Microsoft Windows	April 1, 2002	Mekada	
Dinotopia: Game Land Activity Center	Microsoft Windows	May 1, 2002	ImageBuilder Software	
The Worst-Case Scenario Survival Trivia Challenge	Microsoft Windows	May 15, 2002	Gunnar Games	
Snowboard Park Tycoon	Microsoft Windows	August 9, 2002	Cat Daddy Games	
Cabela's Big Game Hunter 6	Microsoft Windows	August 27, 2002	NFusion Interactive	
Cabela's Ultimate Deer Hunt 2	Microsoft Windows	August 27, 2002	Sylum Entertainment	
Revolution	Microsoft Windows	October 8, 2002	Fun Labs	
Street Legal	Microsoft Windows	October 15, 2002	Invictus Games	
The Gladiators of Rome	Microsoft Windows	October 27, 2002	Cat Daddy Games	
Donald Trump's Real Estate Tycoon!	Microsoft Windows	November 1, 2002	Red Cap Entertainment	
U.S. Most Wanted: Nowhere to Hide	Microsoft Windows	November 2, 2002	Fun Labs	
Shrek: Swamp Fun with Early Math	Microsoft Windows	November 5, 2002	ImageBuilder Software	
Shrek: Swamp Fun with Phonics	Microsoft Windows	November 5, 2002	ImageBuilder Software	
Cabela's Big Game Hunter	PlayStation 2	November 19, 2002	Sand Grain Studios	
Cabela's Big Game Hunter	Game Boy Advance	December 10, 2002	ImageBuilder Software	
Virtua Tennis	Microsoft Windows	2002	Strangelite	
The History Channel: Civil War - Great Battles	Microsoft Windows	January 13, 2003	Cat Daddy Games	
AH-64 Apache Air Assault	Microsoft Windows	February 2003	InterActive Vision	
Gods and Generals	Microsoft Windows	March 1, 2003	AniVision	
Cabela's 4x4 Off-Road Adventure III	Microsoft Windows	March 25, 2003	Fun Labs	
Atlantis Underwater Tycoon	Microsoft Windows	April 15, 2003	Anarchy Enterprises	
Big Biz Tycoon! 2	Microsoft Windows	June 12, 2003	4HEAD Studios	
Cruise Ship Tycoon	Microsoft Windows	June 18, 2003	Cat Daddy Games	
Street Legal Racing: Redline	Microsoft Windows	July 18, 2003	Invictus Games	
Tough Trucks: Modified Monsters	Microsoft Windows	July 21, 2003	Bugbear Entertainment	
Cabela's Big Game Hunter 2004	Microsoft Windows	August 26, 2003	Fun Labs	
Cabela's Big Game Hunter 2004	PlayStation 2	August 26, 2003	Sand Grain Studios	
Cabela's Big Game Hunter 2004	Xbox	August 26, 2003	Fun Labs	
SeaWorld Adventure Parks Tycoon	Microsoft Windows	October 14, 2003	Deep Red Games	
Cabela's Dangerous Hunts	PlayStation 2	November 11, 2003	Sand Grain Studios	
Cabela's Dangerous Hunts	Xbox	November 11, 2003	Sand Grain Studios	
The History Channel: Crusades - Quest for Power	Microsoft Windows	November 11, 2003	Zono	
Secret Service: Security Breach	Microsoft Windows	2003	4D Rulers / Slam Software	
Cabela's Dangerous Hunts	Microsoft Windows	January 13, 2004	Fun Labs	
Riot Police	Microsoft Windows	January 14, 2004	Zono	
Monster Garage	Microsoft Windows	January 26, 2004	Invictus Games	
The History Channel: Alamo - Fight for Independence	Microsoft Windows	April 13, 2004	Zono	
FBI Hostage Rescue	Microsoft Windows	May 2, 2004	Idol FX	
Shrek 2: Activity Center	Microsoft Windows	May 4, 2004	AWE Productions	
Rapala Pro Fishing	Game Boy Advance	July 27, 2004	Torus Games	
Rapala Pro Fishing	Microsoft Windows	July 27, 2004	Magic Wand Productions	
Rapala Pro Fishing	PlayStation 2	July 27, 2004	Sand Grain Studios	
Rapala Pro Fishing	Xbox	July 27, 2004	Fun Labs	
Cabela's Deer Hunt: 2005 Season	Microsoft Windows	August 27, 2004	Magic Wand Productions	
Cabela's Deer Hunt: 2005 Season	PlayStation 2	August 27, 2004	Sand Grain Studios	
Cabela's Deer Hunt: 2005 Season	Xbox	August 27, 2004	Fun Labs	
Cabela's Big Game Hunter 2005 Adventures	Microsoft Windows	September 1, 2004	Magic Wand Productions	
Cold Case Files	Microsoft Windows	September 14, 2004	Gunnar Games	
Mall of America Tycoon	Microsoft Windows	September 28, 2004	4HEAD Studios	
Cabela's Big Game Hunter 2005 Adventures	Xbox	October 1, 2004	Fun Labs	
DreamWorks' Shark Tale Fintastic Fun!	Microsoft Windows	October 7, 2004	Santa Cruz Games	
Cabela's Big Game Hunter 2005 Adventures	PlayStation 2	October 11, 2004	Sand Grain Studios	
Bicycle Casino	Xbox	October 26, 2004	Leaping Lizard Software	
Monster Garage	Xbox	November 2, 2004	Impulse Games	
Greg Hastings' Tournament Paintball	Xbox	November 16, 2004	WXP	
American Chopper	PlayStation 2	November 23, 2004	Creat Studios	
Shrine: Circus Tycoon	Microsoft Windows	November 26, 2004	Reality Flux	
American Chopper	Xbox	December 3, 2004	Creat Studios	
American Chopper	Microsoft Windows	December 22, 2004	Creat Studios	
Cabela's Big Game Hunter 2005 Adventures	GameCube	December 2004	Magic Wand Productions	
Everest	Microsoft Windows	2004	Zono	
The History Channel: Battle of Britain - World War II 1940	Microsoft Windows	2004	iEntertainment Network	
Trading Spaces: Design Companion	Microsoft Windows	2004	Chief Architect Software	
The History Channel - Civil War: The Battle of Bull Run - Take Command: 1861	Microsoft Windows	January 13, 2005	MadMinute Games	
Whac-A-Mole	Game Boy Advance	September 28, 2005	DC Studios	
Whac-A-Mole	Nintendo DS	September 28, 2005	DC Studios	
Greg Hastings' Tournament Paintball Max'd	Xbox	October 18, 2005	WXP	
The Hustle: Detroit Streets	PlayStation Portable	October 26, 2005	Blade Interactive	
American Chopper 2: Full Throttle	GameCube	November 8, 2005	Creat Studios / Driver-Inter	
American Chopper 2: Full Throttle	PlayStation 2	November 8, 2005	Creat Studios / Driver-Inter	
American Chopper 2: Full Throttle	Xbox	November 8, 2005	Creat Studios / Driver-Inter	
Cabela's Dangerous Hunts 2	GameCube	November 2005	Sand Grain Studios	
Cabela's Dangerous Hunts 2	Microsoft Windows	November 2005	Sand Grain Studios	
Cabela's Dangerous Hunts 2	PlayStation 2	November 2005	Sand Grain Studios	
Cabela's Dangerous Hunts 2	Xbox	November 2005	Fun Labs	
The Hustle: Detroit Streets	PlayStation 2	April 27, 2006	Blade Interactive	
The Hustle: Detroit Streets	Xbox	April 27, 2006	Blade Interactive	
Cabela's Dangerous Hunts: Ultimate Challenge	PlayStation Portable	April 2006	Fun Labs	
Hidden Expedition: Titanic	Microsoft Windows	August 1, 2006	Big Fish Games	
Cabela's Alaskan Adventures	PlayStation 2	September 9, 2006	Sand Grain Studios	
Cabela's Alaskan Adventures	Xbox 360	September 9, 2006	Fun Labs	
World Series of Poker: Tournament of Champions	PlayStation 2	September 21, 2006	Left Field Productions	
World Series of Poker: Tournament of Champions	PlayStation Portable	September 21, 2006	Left Field Productions	
World Series of Poker: Tournament of Champions	Xbox 360	September 21, 2006	Left Field Productions	
Go, Diego, Go!: Wolf Pup Rescue	Microsoft Windows	September 2006	Sarbakan	
The Backyardigans: Mission to Mars	Microsoft Windows	September 2006	360KID	
Cabela's Alaskan Adventures	Microsoft Windows	October 2, 2006	Magic Wand Productions	
World Series of Poker: Tournament of Champions	Microsoft Windows	October 2, 2006	Left Field Productions	
Cabela's African Safari	PlayStation 2	October 17, 2006	Sand Grain Studios	
Cabela's African Safari	PlayStation Portable	October 17, 2006	Sand Grain Studios	
Cabela's African Safari	Xbox 360	October 17, 2006	Fun Labs	
Cabela's African Safari	Microsoft Windows	October 2006	Magic Wand Productions	
The History Channel: Civil War - A Nation Divided	PlayStation 2	November 7, 2006	Cauldron / Hwy1 Productions	
The History Channel: Civil War - A Nation Divided	Microsoft Windows	November 10, 2006	Cauldron	
The History Channel: Civil War - A Nation Divided	Xbox 360	November 11, 2006	Cauldron	
World Series of Poker: Tournament of Champions	Wii	November 22, 2006	Left Field Productions	
Virtual Villagers: The Lost Children	Microsoft Windows	July 24, 2007	LDW Software	
Cabela's Trophy Bucks	Microsoft Windows	September 25, 2007	Fun Labs	
Cabela's Trophy Bucks	PlayStation 2	September 25, 2007	Sand Grain Studios	
Cabela's Trophy Bucks	Xbox 360	September 25, 2007	Fun Labs	
Hot Wheels: Beat That!	PlayStation 2	September 25, 2007	Eutechnyx	
Hot Wheels: Beat That!	Wii	September 25, 2007	Eutechnyx	
World Series of Poker 2008: Battle for the Bracelets	PlayStation 2	September 25, 2007	Left Field Productions	
World Series of Poker 2008: Battle for the Bracelets	PlayStation 3	September 25, 2007	Left Field Productions	
World Series of Poker 2008: Battle for the Bracelets	Xbox 360	September 25, 2007	Left Field Productions	
World Series of Poker 2008: Battle for the Bracelets	Microsoft Windows	October 30, 2007	Left Field Productions	
World Series of Poker 2008: Battle for the Bracelets	PlayStation Portable	November 6, 2007	Left Field Productions	
Cabela's Big Game Hunter	Xbox 360	November 8, 2007	Fun Labs	
Monster Jam	Microsoft Windows	November 13, 2007	Torus Games	
Monster Jam	PlayStation 2	November 13, 2007	Torus Games	
Monster Jam	Xbox 360	November 13, 2007	Torus Games	
Monster Jam	Wii	November 19, 2007	Torus Games	
The History Channel: Battle for the Pacific	Microsoft Windows	December 4, 2007	Ladyluck Digital Media	
The History Channel: Battle for the Pacific	PlayStation 2	December 4, 2007	Sand Grain Studios	
The History Channel: Battle for the Pacific	Wii	December 4, 2007	Magic Wand Productions	
The History Channel: Battle for the Pacific	Xbox 360	December 4, 2007	Cauldron	
Cabela's Monster Bass	PlayStation 2	2007	Sand Grain Studios	
The History Channel: Battle for the Pacific	PlayStation 3	February 19, 2008	Cauldron	
Cabela's Trophy Bucks	Wii	June 3, 2008	Sand Grain Studios	
Little League World Series Baseball 2008	Nintendo DS	August 5, 2008	Black Lantern Studios	
Little League World Series Baseball 2008	Wii	August 5, 2008	Now Production	
Civil War: Secret Missions	PlayStation 2	November 4, 2008	Cauldron	
Civil War: Secret Missions	PlayStation 3	November 4, 2008	Cauldron	
Civil War: Secret Missions	Xbox 360	November 4, 2008	Cauldron	
Secret Service	Microsoft Windows	November 4, 2008	Cauldron	
Secret Service	PlayStation 2	November 4, 2008	Cauldron	
Secret Service	Xbox 360	November 4, 2008	Cauldron	
Civil War: Secret Missions	Microsoft Windows	November 11, 2008	Cauldron	
Forgotten Riddles: The Mayan Princess	Microsoft Windows	2008	Blue Tea Games	
Mystery in London	Microsoft Windows	2008	Big Fish Games	
Big League Sports: Summer Sports	Wii	June 16, 2009	Koolhaus Games	
Jewel Quest Mysteries	Nintendo DS	November 2009	GameBrains	
10 Minute Solution	Wii	June 29, 2010	Seamless Entertainment	
iCarly 2: iJoin the Click!	Nintendo DS	November 16, 2010	Big Blue Bubble	
iCarly 2: iJoin the Click!	Wii	November 19, 2010	Big Blue Bubble	
Cabela's Big Game Hunter 2012	PlayStation 3	September 27, 2011	Cauldron	
Cabela's Big Game Hunter 2012	Wii	September 27, 2011	Cauldron	
Cabela's Big Game Hunter 2012	Xbox 360	September 27, 2011	Cauldron	
Wipeout 2	Kinect	October 11, 2011	Behaviour Interactive Chile	
Wipeout 2	Nintendo 3DS	October 11, 2011	Behaviour Interactive Chile	
Wipeout 2	PlayStation 3	October 11, 2011	Behaviour Interactive Chile	
Wipeout 2	Wii	October 11, 2011	Behaviour Interactive Chile	
Cabela's Adventure Camp	Kinect	November 1, 2011	Cauldron	
Cabela's Adventure Camp	Microsoft Windows	November 1, 2011	Cauldron	
Cabela's Adventure Camp	Wii	November 1, 2011	Cauldron	
Cabela's Survival: Shadows of Katmai	PlayStation 3	November 1, 2011	Fun Labs	
Cabela's Survival: Shadows of Katmai	Wii	November 1, 2011	Fun Labs	
Cabela's Survival: Shadows of Katmai	Xbox 360	November 1, 2011	Fun Labs	
Generator Rex: Agent of Providence	PlayStation 3	November 1, 2011	Virtuos	
Generator Rex: Agent of Providence	Wii	November 1, 2011	Virtuos	
Generator Rex: Agent of Providence	Xbox 360	November 1, 2011	Virtuos	
DreamWorks Super Star Kartz	Nintendo 3DS	November 15, 2011	High Impact Games	
DreamWorks Super Star Kartz	PlayStation 3	November 15, 2011	High Impact Games	
DreamWorks Super Star Kartz	Wii	November 15, 2011	High Impact Games	
DreamWorks Super Star Kartz	Xbox 360	November 15, 2011	High Impact Games	
Rapala for Kinect	Kinect	November 15, 2011	Now Production	
