= The Cameron Files =

The Cameron Files may refer to:

- The Cameron Files: Secret at Loch Ness, a video game
- The Cameron Files: Pharaoh's Curse, a video game sequel
