= Cabela's Big Game Hunter III =

1999 video game

- Developer: Elsinore Multimedia
- Publisher: HeadGames Publishing
- Platform: Windows
- Release: NA: September 22, 1999
- Genres: Sports; Hunting

Cabela's Big Game Hunter III is the second sequel to the original Cabela's Big Game Hunter. It was released in 1999 by HeadGames Publishing.

== Gameplay ==
Cabela’s Big Game Hunter III is a hunting simulation set in four U.S. regions where players track animals across large 3D environments or use one of more than 60 stands. Wildlife includes multiple deer species, bear, caribou, elk, moose, sheep, and various protected or non‑game animals. The game offers Quick Hunt for immediate play or a Complete Hunt mode requiring players to fill regional tags within a five‑day limit. Preparation involves buying gear, obtaining tags, sighting weapons, and managing inventory. During hunts, spotting an animal triggers a live‑action aiming view; successful hits return the player to tracking, while wounded animals must be followed. Weather varies by region, and a Game Warden enforces hunting rules. Quick Hunt ends with earning a trophy, while Complete Hunt concludes when all tags are filled or time expires.

== Development ==
Cabela's Big Game Hunter III was announced in August 1999. An expansion pack dubbed Cabela's Big Game Hunter III: The Next Harvest was released in February 2000.

== Reception ==
The game ranked 6th on PC Data's list of Top-Selling Games Software for October 1999. It also ranked 17th on PC Data's list of Top-Selling Games Software for February 2000.
