= Robot Arena 2: Design and Destroy =

2003 video game

- Developer: Gabriel Entertainment
- Publisher: Infogrames
- Series: Robot Arena
- Platform: Microsoft Windows
- Release: February 18, 2003
- Genres: Robot combat, Action
- Modes: Single-player, multiplayer

Robot Arena 2: Design and Destroy is a robot combat action video game developed by Gabriel Entertainment and published by Infogrames. It is the sequel to Robot Arena, in the Robot Arena videogame series. Compared to its predecessor, it has many new features, such as the Havok physics engine and fully 3-D environments.

The player has the ability to completely design their own robot, including chassis design, weapon placement, mechanics and paint. Weapons are nearly completely customizable, including weapons that mount on various attachments, such as poles, disks, and tribars.

The game continues to have an active community, as of 2026.

== Gameplay ==
Robot Arena 2: Design and Destroy is an Action game. The player controls a radio-controlled robot which battles it out with other robots in order to win. Ways to win a battle include destroying the opponent's control board, immobilizing the opponent (such as flipping them over), having the most points at the end or in some cases eliminating them by pushing them into pits.

Different types of arenas are available to play, either being a standard map, a tabletop map, or a "king of the hill" map.

Different game types are available in single player, where either the player can play against 1 opponent, 3 others in a Battle Royale, or a 2v2 team-based match.

The main game mode is League mode where the player competes against fifteen other teams in nine events. The winner is the team with the most points at the end of the season.

Multiplayer is also available, where up to four players can pit their designs against their opponents. Online play was also supported which was facilitated by GameSpy.

There is also an exhibition mode, where you can place any of your bots against any computer bot in the game in a match, with settings controlling time limit, match type & arena, and if the hazards are active.

== Reception ==
The game received very positive reviews from critics and fans alike, and is widely considered the best robot combat video game ever released, better even than the officially licensed Robot Wars games. As of 2025, the game retains a cult following online, most notably on GameTechMods, which hosts frequent tournaments.

GameSpy gave it 77 out of 100 writing "A pleasant surprise. Whether you're going head-to-head against formidable AI bots or human opponents, it has plenty to offer both newcomers and bot-bashing aficionados alike".

== Sequel ==
A sequel, Robot Arena III, was released on 26 May 2016 on Steam.
