= World Series of Poker (video game) =

2005 video game

- North American Xbox cover art
- Developer: Left Field Productions
- Publisher: Activision
- Producer: Aaron Thompson
- Programmers: David Anderson; Dan Olsen
- Artist: Alvyn Ramirez
- Composer: DeWolfe Music
- Platforms: GameCube, PlayStation 2, Xbox, PlayStation Portable, Windows
- Release: August 31, 2005: NA: August 31, 2005 (PS2, Xbox); NA: September 13, 2005 (Win); NA: September 14, 2005 (GC); NA: September 15, 2005 (PSP); AU: February 1, 2006 (Win, PS2, Xbox); AU: February 3, 2006 (PSP); EU: February 24, 2006 (PS2, Xbox, PC, PSP)
- Genre: Traditional (poker)
- Modes: Single-player, multiplayer

World Series of Poker is a video game based on the popular gambling tournament World Series of Poker. It is succeeded by World Series of Poker: Tournament of Champions and World Series of Poker 2008: Battle for the Bracelets. It was released for the GameCube, PlayStation 2, Xbox, PlayStation Portable, and Windows.

Games included in the World Series of Poker package are Omaha, Omaha hi-low split, seven-card stud, seven-card stud hi-low split, razz (seven stud lowball), and Texas hold 'em.

While Xbox Live for the original Xbox was shut down in 2010, World Series of Poker is now playable online using replacement online servers for the original Xbox called Insignia.

== Reception ==
The game received "generally unfavorable reviews" on all platforms except the Xbox version, which received "mixed" reviews, according to the review aggregation website Metacritic.

Reception

Aggregate score
Aggregator	Score				
Aggregator	GameCube	PC	PS2	PSP	Xbox
Metacritic	44/100	39/100	46/100	37/100	52/100

Review scores
Publication	Score				
Publication	GameCube	PC	PS2	PSP	Xbox
GameRevolution	N/A	N/A	D	N/A	D
GameSpot	5.8/10	4.7/10	6.8/10	N/A	6.8/10
GameZone	N/A	N/A	6.5/10	N/A	6/10
IGN	3.5/10	N/A	3.5/10	3.3/10	3.5/10
Jeuxvideo.com	N/A	N/A	13/20	13/20	N/A
Nintendo Power	4.5/10	N/A	N/A	N/A	N/A
Official U.S. PlayStation Magazine	N/A	N/A	1/5	1.5/5	N/A
Official Xbox Magazine (UK)	N/A	N/A	N/A	N/A	4.3/10
Pocket Gamer	N/A	N/A	N/A	3/5	N/A
TeamXbox	N/A	N/A	N/A	N/A	5.9/10
The Sydney Morning Herald	N/A	N/A	2/5	N/A	2/5
