= Cabela's Big Game Hunter II =

1998 video game

- Developer: Elsinore Multimedia
- Publisher: HeadGames Publishing
- Platform: Microsoft Windows
- Release: NA: 1998
- Genre: Sports

Cabela's Big Game Hunter II is a hunting video game published by HeadGames Publishing. It is a sequel to Cabela's Big Game Hunter, and was released in 1998.

== Gameplay ==
Upon starting the game, the player can create an on-screen character and begin with some amount of money to buy permits, weapons and hunting gear. By correctly shooting the animal with a permit, a screen detailing the vital signs of it is shown, and the player will receive some money. The game uses a 360 degree circle movement where scents and calls can be used for attracting animals. There are four locations in the game: Colorado, Canada, New Mexico, and an African safari.

== Reception ==
Reception

Aggregate score
Aggregator	Score
GameRankings	40%

Review score
Publication	Score
AllGame	2/5

Games Domain said "I know that the off season can be long and boring, but a better evening can be spent cleaning guns than playing this game".

Big Game Hunter II achieved global sales of 350,000 units by February 1999. The game received "unfavorable" reviews according to video game review aggregator GameRankings.

The game ranked 3rd on PC Data's list of Top-Selling Games Software for the week of April 4 to 10 in 1999.

== Expansion pack ==
Cabela's Big Game Hunter II: Open Season is an expansion pack for the original game. It released in 1998, featuring a range of new weapons, ammunition, animals, authentic Cabela's hunting gear and a new map.
