= Chocolatier 2: Secret Ingredients =

2008 video game

- Chocolatier 2: Secret Ingredients promo picture on PlayFirst
- Developer: Big Splash Games LLC
- Publisher: PlayFirst
- Producer: Michael Thornton Wyman
- Designers: Jon Blossom; Stephen Lewis; Michael Thornton Wyman
- Programmer: Jon Blossom
- Series: Chocolatier
- Engine: Playground SDK
- Platforms: Windows; Mac OS X
- Release: November 27, 2007
- Genres: Business simulation, strategy
- Mode: Single-player

Chocolatier 2: Secret Ingredients is a casual strategy video game, developed by Big Splash Games LLC and published by PlayFirst. The game was released in 2007 for Mac OS X and Windows. In the game, players are able to create chocolate by combining ingredients, but they have to know the exact combination to get the secret recipe. It is the second video game in the Chocolatier series.

The game, developed in only six months, was well received by critics on its release. Although critics considered the game similar to its predecessor, its changes were praised, especially the additions made to the action mechanics present during the making of chocolates. A sequel, Chocolatier: Decadence by Design, was released in 2009.

== Gameplay and plot ==
While the first game was set in the 1880s, Chocolatier 2: Secret Ingredients is set in the 1920s. Within this setting, the game incorporates Art Deco elements in its menus and interface and a soundtrack based on the Jazz Age. In the story mode, the player must team up with Alexandra Tangye, granddaughter of Chocolatier's protagonist Evangeline Baumeister, to discover new recipes and rebuild Baumeister Confections. As in its predecessor, there is also a free play mode, which allows the player to play without set missions and at their own pace. The game's main addition compared to its predecessor is the presence of the taste lab, in the port of Buenos Aires. There, the player can experiment with the ingredients they've already unlocked and create new recipes that can't be obtained any other way, such as a recipe for chocolate-covered ants.

The minigame played when making a chocolate recipe for the first time is still present, but with added variations. This time, the circular trays can move in a line or in a zigzag pattern, and not just in a circle around the ingredient gun. A colour-matching mechanic has also been added, guaranteeing bonuses to the player if they combine ingredients of the same colour. There are 16 traditional ports in Chocolatier 2, where you can find a market to buy items, usually a shop where you can sell chocolates and, in six of them, a factory: Abidjan, Buenos Aires, Cairo, Casablanca, Cayenne, Jakarta, Mahajanga, Manila, Moscow, Mumbai, New York, Paris, San José, San Francisco, Shanghai, and Sydney. Furthermore, there are four ‘hidden’ harbours that are unlocked through missions or conversations with other characters and contain secret items that can be used in the chocolate lab: the Amazon, Fiji, the Himalayas and the Sahara. It is also possible to haggle with vendors in every market.

== Reception ==
Reception

Review scores
Publication	Score
Den of Geek	3/5
Inside Mac Games	6.75/10
Gamezebo	4.5/5

Writing for Wired, Susan Arendt stated that Chocolatier 2 "improves virtually every single aspect of its predecessor, from the recipes to the plot to the music that plays when you’re actually making chocolate." Gamezebo's Meryl K. Evans emphasised that "not only does [it] live up to the original, but its new features take it to another level," highlighting the evolution of cities over time. On the other hand, she criticised the limited options for customising the company logo compared to the previous game. On a negative note, Richard Hallas of Inside Mac Games lamented the lack of variation in the basic objectives of the story mode.

The changes to the chocolate-making minigame were generally praised. Hallas stated that, "[p]articularly when making the more exotic recipes that require up to six ingredients and several different colors, the enhanced mini-game is both far more interesting and much more challenging than before." The game's difficulty was also praised by Arendt, highlighting the random events that add risk and strategy to the gameplay. Several journalists highlighted the game's addictive quality. Laura Blackwell, from PC World, declared it "as addictive as the food of the gods." Arendt praised the game as "smart, satisfying, and extremely addictive." A reviewer from Diamond Games stated that she was "all for a third edition of the game" and that she had "stayed up late several times unable to pull [herself] away."
