= Cat Girl Alliance =

2004 video game

- Developer: Sekilala
- Publishers: JP: CD Bros.; NA: G-Collections
- Platform: Microsoft Windows 98
- Release: JP: February 2, 2004; NA: February 8, 2010
- Genre: Visual novel
- Mode: Single-player

Koneko Doumei (仔猫同盟, Koneko Doumei) is a Japanese erotic visual novel developed by Sekilala and published by CD Bros., released on February 20, 2004 for Windows. It was localized in North America as Cat Girl Alliance by G-Collections on February 20, 2010.

== Gameplay ==
Cat Girl Alliance, in traditional fashion, is played by watching and listening to episodic sequences of the game and then selecting or ignoring actions when they are presented to the player. Choices are effectively plot twists, and are intricately linked so that the direction of the developing story changes moderately as each is made; ultimately leading to erotic scenes between characters and one of eight endings. For the player to watch all these possible endings, in this regard, he or she will have to replay the game several times, making different selections than those made before.

== Plot ==
Eiji Tachibana is a young Japanese transfer student beginning his first semester at an unmentioned, fictional junior college. Distant and unacquainted with the rest of the school, Eiji is, for the most part, a friendless and withdrawn boy. The only person who seems to even acknowledge his presence is Shizuko Azumi, the girl who sits behind him.

One morning after class, Shizuko invites Eiji to lunch; Rumi Takahata, the bubbly class representative, excitedly joins as well. As the three sit and eat, Eiji discusses his social predicament, to which both girls suggest he join an extracurricular club. Eiji accepts their advice, and dissatisfied with the athletics and cultural departments, finds comfort in the health committee; by assumption, he visits the infirmary to meet with the group. When he arrives, however, he is shocked to find Rumi and another girl, Natsuki Misawa, having sex. Even more surprising is that Rumi is not entirely female; she is, in fact, a hermaphrodite. Glued to the scene before him, Eiji furtively watches and leaves.

The following day, things seemed to have gone unnoticed. After class, as he reluctantly decides whether or not to visit the infirmary again, a fellow student named Masayoshi informs Eiji that his sister would like to see him there. Besides learning that the boy is her brother, Rumi is quite aware of yesterday's events and offers Eiji the chance to snag Shizuko in the same manner. Though plagued with a mixed conscience, he agrees.

== Characters ==
Eiji Tachibana (Tachibana Eiji)

Modest and nondescript, Eiji Tachibana is the unlikely protagonist of the game. A recent transfer student to his school, his lonesome life becomes convoluted when his curiosity leads him to become a part of a sexual, underground student group disguised as a harmless club. Despite his careless behavior, Eiji is an honest, friendly, and especially introspective person, able to sense the mood of other people, though he is as easily readable. Eiji prefers the indoors and enjoys watching television.

Rumi Takahata (高畑 るみ, Takahata Rumi)

Voiced by: Aya Izumi
Rumi Takahata is a nineteen-year-old undergraduate who is on the student council as a class representative and serves as the most iconic character in the game. Besides her elected academic status to her classmates, she is also the president of the health committee, an obscure clique that participates in explicit sexual practices. While Rumi is a naturally effervescent and outspoken co-ed, she can at times be particularly authoritative, sadistic, and intolerant, especially during group activities. Rumi is a biological hermaphrodite and is, by extension, bisexual. She is most recognized for her titular cat apparel.

Natsuki Misawa (三澤 奈月, Misawa Natsuki)

Voiced by: Kaoru Imai
Reticent and peculiar, Natsuki Misawa is a fellow nineteen-year-old undergraduate and member of the health committee. Despite her noticeably indifferent outward image, Natsuki is meek, dependent, and masochistic. Having been orphaned as a child and brought in by the Takahatas, she is the rough equivalent of an adoptive sister to Rumi, whom she expresses unconditional altruistic compliance. She is initially discontent with Eiji and his blossoming friendship with Rumi, viewing it as a rivalry; throughout her acquaintance with him, however, she grows fond of and closer to him herself. Given her openness to partners, Natsuki is also bisexual.

Shizuko Azumi (安曇 静子, Azumi Shizuko)

Voiced by: Daiana Don
Shizuko Azumi is a nineteen-year-old undergraduate who is the third and last female protagonist. She is seated directly behind Eiji and is the only one of all his classmates who genuinely welcomes him as a friend. A soft-spoken, gentle, focused, and diligent girl, Shizuko is snared in the same dilemma that claims Eiji, and, despite her seemingly dignified person, humbly agrees to join the group. Of the entire female cast, Shizuko has the largest bust.

Masayoshi Takahata (高畑 真美, Takahata Masayoshi)

Voiced by: Kaori Hinomiya
Confident and well-mannered, Masayoshi Takahata is an eighteen-year-old undergraduate and the second, final, though minor, male cast member. A somewhat uninvolved character, Masayoshi is a delicate and hesitant individual noted for his unusually feminine appearance. As his last name suggests, he is the younger, affectionate brother of Rumi, who, having been questionably caught with her underwear in the past, doubles as her obedient footman.

== Development ==
G-Collections reportedly began work on Cat Girl Alliance, retitled from Koneko Doumei, as early as January 2008. The following year, license and distributor JAST USA announced via its website that it would be promoting the project at Anime Expo 2009. On July 10, JAST reported that it had begun work on Cat Girl Alliance, its next confirmed title, and had made plans to release it sometime that September.

The project failed to meet its September release date, but over a month, the course was continually covered. On September 16, JAST published a sneak peek of the game, adding that it was at work with Sekilala to put the finishing touches on the project, such as integrating the newly translated script; the game demonstrated full compatibility with Microsoft Windows Vista and 7. Cat Girl Alliance entered post-production and subsequent beta testing the following November, rescheduled for release in winter. That December, reporting that post-production was nearing an end and that Cat Girl Alliance would be going gold soon, JAST published an outline of the game's cumulative development, noting work on the graphics, scenes, and text. On December 31, New Year's Eve, the company reported that G-Collections had finished work on the game and that it was currently undergoing replication; Cat Girl Alliance was affirmed gold. Additionally, the official website for the game had also gone live.

The following February, JAST announced that Cat Girl Alliance had finished replication and was stocked for shipping. Shortly after, on February 17, the company published that the download edition of the game had become available. Several websites reported on the game around this time.

== Reception ==
Considered by JAST USA and J-LIST.com, respectively, to be G-Collections most "ecchi" and "kinkiest" title to-date, Cat Girl Alliance was met with mixed reception. Industry aggregator Mania.com gave the game a B+, calling it a "solid release" that, while containing a friendly interface and decent soundtrack, suffered from mediocre visuals and translation. Shogungamer.com published a favorable review as well, praising the soundtrack and visuals.

Following up to a pre-release review of the game, Japanator.com intern Jon Snyder wrote "this game was little more than a string of pornographic images and accompanying text, barely held together by poor voice acting and something that could be called a 'plot'[...]"
