= John Deere: American Farmer =

2004 video game

- Cover art
- Developer: Gabriel Entertainment
- Publisher: Destineer
- Platform: Windows
- Release: June 29, 2004
- Genre: Construction and management simulation

John Deere: American Farmer is a farm construction and management simulation for Microsoft Windows featuring the John Deere license, developed by Gabriel Entertainment, published by Destineer Studios.

== Gameplay ==
In the game, players must establish and maintain a successful farm.

== Development ==
The game was in development for nearly a year.

== Sequel ==
In 2006 a sequel, John Deere: American Farmer Deluxe was released.
