= Cabela's Outdoor Trivia Challenge =

1999 video game

- Developer: Elsinore Multimedia Inc.
- Publisher: HeadGames Publishing, Inc.
- Platform: Windows
- Release: December 8, 1999
- Genre: Quiz

Cabela's Outdoor Trivia Challenge is about testing your knowledge on subjects dealing with five categories of outdoor activities and is designed on a boardgame fashion. It was developed by Elsinore Multimedia Inc. and released December 8, 1999.
The game was published by HeadGames Publishing, Inc., in conjunction with hunting supply company Cabela's.
