= Cabela's Big Game Hunter =

- Genres: Action, sports
- Developers: Elsinore Multimedia nFusion Interactive LLC; Coresoft; Magic Wand Productions; Sand Grain Studios; Cauldron; Fun Labs
- Publishers: HeadGames Publishing, Inc. Activision
- Platform: List: Microsoft Windows PlayStation 2 Game Boy Advance Xbox GameCube PlayStation Portable Xbox 360 Wii PlayStation 3 Wii U
- First release: Cabela's Big Game Hunter; February 15, 1998
- Latest release: Cabela's Big Game Hunter: Pro Hunts; March 25, 2014

Cabela's Big Game Hunter is a hunting video game series published by HeadGames Publishing, Inc and Activision from 1998 to 2014, named after retailer Cabela's.

== Games ==
=== Cabela's Big Game Hunter 4 (2000) ===
Cabela's Big Game Hunter 4 was developed by Elsinore Multimedia Inc. and published by Activision in 2000.

AllGame gave the game a score of three stars out of four, saying that it "does a good job of simulating actual hunts and hopefully the series will evolve into full use of 3D graphics, which would drastically improve the overall presentation. Even with the basic graphics, it's still fun to play and because you have the capability to create your own land, it allows you to get more involved. Those aspects, combined with the exceptional number of animals from which you can choose and the multitude of game settings, provide for a very good hunting simulation."

=== Cabela's Big Game Hunter 5: Platinum Series (2001) ===
Cabela's Big Game Hunter 5: Platinum Series was developed by Elsinore Multimedia Inc. and published by Activision in 2001. The game introduces a new feature, varmint hunting.

=== Cabela's Big Game Hunter 6 (2002) ===
Cabela's Big Game Hunter 6 was developed by nFusion Interactive and published by Activision Value Publishing, it was released on August 27, 2002. For the first time in the series, hunting can be done in two ways: in 3D graphics or in live action video. Game World Navigator gave the game a score of 6.8 out of 10.

=== Cabela's Big Game Hunter PS2 (2002) ===
Cabela's Big Game Hunter (PS2) was developed by Sand Grain Studios and published by Activision Value Publishing. It was released on November 19, 2002.

=== Cabela's Big Game Hunter (2007) ===
Cabela's Big Game Hunter
- Developers: Sand Grain Studios (PS2); Fun Labs (Xbox 360); Magic Wand Productions (Wii)
- Publisher: Activision
- Platforms: PlayStation 2, Wii, Xbox 360
- Release: PlayStation 2, Xbox 360: NA: November 6, 2007; AU: March 5, 2008; Wii: NA: November 13, 2007; AU: March 5, 2008
- Genre: Hunting
- Mode: Single player

Cabela's Big Game Hunter was developed by Sand Grain Studios, Fun Labs and Magic Wand Productions for the PlayStation 2, Wii and Xbox 360. It released on November 6, 2007.

Big Game Hunter has the players venturing to different lands and meeting the hunting ranger in each. From there, the player can either play a mini-game of shooting smaller animals or flying birds, hunting medium-sized game, and going after the trophy animal It features the hunting areas of Montana, British Columbia, Zambia, Argentina, Ethiopia, and New Zealand. The gameplay relies on hunting tags for each animal in the game. After shooting the animal(s) the players has a tag for, the adrenaline meter goes up. When it becomes full, everything except the player stops moving.

=== Cabela's Big Game Hunter 2010 (2009) ===
Cabela's Big Game Hunter 2010
- Developer: Cauldron
- Publisher: Activision
- Platforms: PlayStation 3, Wii, Xbox 360
- Release: NA: September 29, 2009

Cabela's Big Game Hunter 2010 was developed by Cauldron and published by Activision for the PlayStation 3, Wii and Xbox 360. It was released on September 29, 2009.

The player takes control of a marksman named Jack Wilde, who is trying to become a member of a hunting club The Royal Ancient Order of Orion. There are 12 story levels, with Order of Orion via radio, placed in territories across the world like mountains of Canada, New Zealand, the deserts of Argentina, and others. The goal is to find and hunt various animals (with Wilde's hunting senses), as a requirement to be accepted in the club. Falling off ledges or logs, or stepping on noisy terrain could cause failure in the hunt. Aggressive animals, such as bear or mountain lion, will attack the player.

=== Cabela's Big Game Hunter: Hunting Party (2011) ===
Cabela's Big Game Hunter: Hunting Party was released exclusively for the Kinect on Xbox 360 in 2011.
