= Cabela's Big Game Hunter 2006 Trophy Season =

2005 video game

- Developer: Magic Wand Productions
- Publisher: Activision Value: EU: Zoo Digital Publishing
- Platform: Microsoft Windows
- Release: NA: September 27, 2005; PAL: March 3, 2006
- Genre: Sports

Cabela's Big Game Hunter 2006 Trophy Season is the ninth sequel to the original Cabela's Big Game Hunter. It was developed by Magic Wand Productions and released on October 25, 2005. The game was published by Activision in conjunction with hunting supply company Cabela's. It is a PC port of the console version of Cabela's Big Game Hunter 2005 Adventures.

== Gameplay ==
Cabela's Big Game Hunter 2006 Trophy Season is a story-driven, linear hunting game. The player must trek through various North American landscapes and claim every trophy in the region. The player starts at the first lodge, where they must buy their initial equipment, weapons, and clothing, sight their firearm, and obtain tags. The player must visit the warden of each lodge in order to obtain tags for the region. Throughout the game, the player will encounter random events, side quests, and hunting tournaments. Primary objectives must be completed before exiting a location, while secondary objectives are optional. Objectives can be failed but the career's completion is not contingent on them.

Game mammals are represented by red markers, similar to its predecessor Cabela's Big Game Hunter 2005 Adventures. Red markers indicate live game, blue markers indicate dead game, and purple markers indicate wounded or special game. Non-game mammals and some female s of some species - elk, moose, and deer - are unmarked. Tags cannot be obtained for these animals and the player cannot hunt them. Non-game mammals include foxes and rabbits. The player can only hunt mammals for which they have tags, and in their respective quantities. All tags are provided by the warden for each location and cannot be changed, removed, or sold. The objectives for each location mandate that the player obtain at least one of each animal, while the player will often be provided two tags for many species.

When the player zooms in on a mammal with a scope, text will appear at the bottom of the scope, showing the animal's species, sex, scoring, and immediate distance from the player. This is helpful in hunting tournaments, as many require the player to claim an animal within a certain distance or by best score. The animal statistics provided by the scope will change as the player mouses over different targets. Non-game animals can also provide statistics if the player mouses over them while scoped over them.

The player cannot hunt animals for which they do not have tags, including non-game mammals. The player cannot hunt animals with their vehicle. The player cannot drive into an NPC. The player cannot fire their weapon between 6:00pm and 8:00am. The player cannot fire their weapon within 50 yards of an inhabited building. Violating these results in warnings. The player has a maximum of three warnings before they are asked to leave the area, from which they can either restart the location or abort to the main menu.

== Plot ==
Upon starting a career hunt, a text box will appear describing the player as the grandson of a hunting legend named Pete. The player accompanied Pete on the hunting trails when he was younger. Pete aspired to bag all species across the trails - 65 in all - hoping to earn a spot in the Hunter's Hall of Fame. However, on one of the last hunts, he slipped on an icy slope and hurt his leg, preventing him from finishing the hunt. The player's incentive to crossing the regions and finishing the hunts is to win his grandfather the plaque. The story is largely absent from the game, but NPCs across the regions will recognize the player as Pete's grandson, or hint that they have not seen the player in a long time. The NPCs have no long-term impact on the story and remain largely irrelevant in the overall gameplay.
