= Cabela's Big Game Hunter: Pro Hunts =

2014 video game

- Developer: Cauldron
- Publisher: Activision
- Series: Cabela's Big Game Hunter
- Platforms: Microsoft Windows; PlayStation 3 Wii U Xbox 360
- Release: NA: March 25, 2014
- Genres: First-person shooter, sports
- Mode: Single-player

Cabela's Big Game Hunter: Pro Hunts is a 2014 hunting simulation video game developed by Cauldron and published by Activision for the Microsoft Windows, PlayStation 3, Wii U, and Xbox 360. It is the final entry in Cabela's Big Game Hunter series and any Cabela's licensed game published by Activision.

The game takes the player on a single-player campaign in North America with four experts from the competitive real world of big-game hunting. Providing advice throughout the game are Wade Middleton, Jim Shockey, and Ralph and Vicki Cianciarulo.

== Gameplay ==
The player has to complete objectives such as hunting an animal with various weapons (rifles, bow, shotgun) in order to progress in the campaign. The player has access to four different hunting areas, all in North America which is divided into the Southeast, Northeast, Southwest and Northwest. Different areas have different animals which can be hunted. Some animals, such as moose, bears, and boars, will charge if surprised, angered, startled, or threatened.

Special animals which can be regarded as game bosses have to be hunted also in a special way to unlock the next hunting area. The game bosses are:

Southeast

- Hogzilla — a huge, ill-tempered wild boar.
- Pincushion — a white-tailed deer who has been shot several times before and has always been able to live another day.

Northeast

- Double Shovel — a trophy caribou.
- Radar — a moose with a keen sense of hearing.

Southwest

- Airplane — a pronghorn with very wide horns.
- The Grey Ghost — a wary and very large racked mule deer.

Northwest

- King — a very skittish roosevelt elk
- Scarface — a very mean grizzly bear who has a taste for moose and a big scar on his face.
