= World Series of Poker: Tournament of Champions =

2006 video game

- North American cover
- Developer: Left Field Productions
- Publisher: Activision
- Platforms: Xbox 360, PlayStation 2, Wii, PlayStation Portable, Microsoft Windows
- Release: September 21, 2006: NA: September 21, 2006; NA: October 2, 2006 (PC); EU: November 10, 2006 (X360); AU: November 29, 2006 (PC, X360); AU: December 13, 2006 (PSP); EU: January 30, 2007 (PC); AU: February 7, 2007 (PS2); EU: February 9, 2007 (PS2, PSP) Wii; NA: December 12, 2006; AU: March 14, 2007; EU: March 16, 2007
- Genre: Card game
- Modes: Single-player, multiplayer

World Series of Poker: Tournament of Champions is a video game based on the popular gambling tournament World Series of Poker and the second licensed WSOP video game released for home video game systems, after the World Series of Poker video game. It was released for Xbox 360, PlayStation 2, Wii, PlayStation Portable and Microsoft Windows.

== Reception ==
Reception

Aggregate score
Aggregator	Score				
Aggregator	PC	PS2	PSP	Wii	Xbox 360
Metacritic	58/100	68/100	70/100	46/100	69/100

Review scores
Publication	Score				
Publication	PC	PS2	PSP	Wii	Xbox 360
GameSpot	5.8/10	6.4/10	6.4/10	5.2/10	6.4/10
GameZone	N/A	6.5/10	N/A	N/A	6.8/10
IGN	7.2/10	7.2/10	7.2/10	4/10	7.2/10
Jeuxvideo.com	7/20	14/20	14/20	N/A	14/20
NGamer	N/A	N/A	N/A	35%	N/A
Nintendo World Report	N/A	N/A	N/A	6/10	N/A
Official Xbox Magazine (UK)	N/A	N/A	N/A	N/A	6/10
Official Xbox Magazine (US)	N/A	N/A	N/A	N/A	8/10
TeamXbox	N/A	N/A	N/A	N/A	8.1/10
The Sydney Morning Herald	N/A	N/A	N/A	N/A	3/5

The game received "mixed or average reviews" on all platforms except the Wii version, which received "generally unfavorable reviews", according to the review aggregation website Metacritic.

== Sequel ==
In 2007, the sequel to WSOP:TOC was released, titled World Series of Poker 2008: Battle for the Bracelets. It is available on the PlayStation 2, Microsoft Windows and all major seventh-generation platforms except the Wii.
