= The Continuum =

2008 video game

- Developer(s): Seven Lights
- Platform(s): Adobe Flash based
- Release: June 25, 2008 (Disruption)
- Genre(s): RPG/Strategy
- Mode(s): Single-player, multiplayer

The Continuum is a discontinued online strategy game that combines turn-based war gaming with role-playing game-like character development and the collectability of a tabletop miniatures game. It takes place in the Crossworld, a new reality formed from the collapse of several formerly separate worlds that became unhinged in the space/time continuum. The game was developed by Seven Lights and launched on June 25, 2008. It has been discontinued as of 2011.

== Gameplay ==
Screenshot of The Continuum

One starts by signing up, and receiving free units to build a squad that a player will use to battle other players and find usable equipment on the battlefield. A player can also purchase units with real money, whether in starter packs of 40, booster packs of 15, or individually. The developers have indicated that everyone may play for free, receiving one free booster pack upon registration. Once a player have purchased their units, they may begin spending their "ability points" to improve the units. Common units have one ability point to spend, Uncommon units have two, Rare units begin with three and Heroic units have four. As a player spend these ability points, they can choose what abilities their units will have in combat. A player's choices is important, though they gain additional ability points as their units level up, depending on their rarity.

Next, a player must form their units into squads within an army. This is easily accomplished by either a simple click of a button or dragging the units into the squad header. Once an army is built, players can discuss the game in the lobby until a player find someone to challenge or is challenged by someone.

After challenging or being challenged by an opponent, a player will choose the point value and map for their battle. Having chosen those aspects and the army that a player will use to battle, they then may explore the various sites for equipment before entering combat against their opponent. Once their squad makes contact with another squad, a player enters a combat screen. Here a player get to make use of those abilities that they purchased in the set-up stage. The battle selection screen is very customizable to prevent abuse of new players by more experience characters.

A player's individual units make use of their skills, they have a squad tactic the player choose (default is attack) based on this tactic, they may or may not gain an advantage to their actions in that round of combat. After three such rounds of combat, a player return to the map screen and may move about again.

The winner (based on the criteria chosen at the beginning of the scenario) is given a larger chunk of experience points to each of their characters. While the defeated player is given less, so that even in losing, a player's characters still gain experience and may level up, just not as fast.

After the scenario is finished, a player can return to their army screen, outfit their units with equipment they found during the battle, spend ability points gained from leveling, and change the composition of their armies and squads.

Primarily involving turn-based squad combat, the game allows players to improve the individual units in their squadron with power-ups, abilities and equipment. Players will be able to find new equipment scattered throughout the game world, and will be rewarded for accomplishing various objectives. In addition to random finds and trading, players can improve their armies through the purchase of expansion packs, similar to those in collectible card games.

The game is designed in a browser-based format using Adobe Flash. The developers have said the format will allow them to add and change content very quickly in response to the community.

== Synopsis ==
The Continuum universe is developed through three issues of a comic book in addition to the game itself. The comics, written by the Seven Lights developers, originate various plot lines that will presumably be critical to the game. A fourth issue is in the works for the launch sometime in mid-2009.

The first issue discusses a war between two shape shifting races, the wolf-like Kherr and the bird-like Talon, and then presents a new cat-like enemy that the two races must come together to defend against. Issue two introduces a vampire hunter and the trials he faces in his task. The two story lines begin to merge at the end of the second issue. The Third issue follows the story of a race of elemental wielding humans known as manifests. It also introduces the first hint of player-to-story interaction, as it is popular belief that the final page in the comic shows a location from the role-playing forum.

Continuum developers have said player actions in the game world will influence the direction of the story line. In addition, they currently plan to expand the story's narrative through additional comics, novels, and digital videos.

=== Realities and Races ===
The Disruption was a cataclysmic event which caused four separate realities to collide and merge. From these original worlds came a variety of races and species, each with their own unique powers and abilities. They were thrown together in this new place, a world which became known as The Crossworld.

==== Shapeshifters ====
A world where all beings can shift from human form to that of a beast. Eternal beings from this world have chosen to stay in their bestial form. These Eternals sometimes form a union or bond with one of their shapeshifting brethren. The Bonded unit and their Eternal partner can utilize devastating coordinated attacks against their unlucky opponents.

Kherr: The Kherr are a fiercely loyal race of beings that can shapeshift between wolf and human form. Living in harmony with the land, the Kherr use their ability to adapt and conceal themselves within their terrain. Kherr are cunning melee warriors, trained from birth in the arts of guerrilla warfare and vicious hand-to-hand combat.

Talon: The Talon are an agile race of beings that can shapeshift between great eagle and human form. With their superior vision and view from above, the Talon can inflict crippling ranged attacks with little risk of taking damage themselves. Talon are adept at civic rule and have great skills at fostering commerce between groups, usually to their own benefit.

Ursa: The Ursa are a race of huge beings that can shapeshift between bear and human form. Ursa are intelligent, artistic, methodical and slow to anger, however when family or kin are threatened, the Ursa become the most aggressive of all races, employing an arsenal of punishing melee attacks.

Ferran: The Ferran are a ferocious race of beings that can shapeshift between great cats and human form. The Ferran are dim, impulsive brutes who bite and slash their way to getting what they want. Ferran are not known for their great strength or strategic prowess, but they make up for it with speed, razor sharp teeth, and long claws. Ferran are nomadic by nature and typically overwhelm foes with superior numbers and lightning-quick surprise attacks.

Ancients: Ancients are a noble race of beings that can shapeshift between dragons and human form. The Ancients hadn't been seen in over a century prior to the Disruption and were thought to be extinct. They had retreated as a race to the highest of mountains- higher than the strongest Talon could reach- to escape the constant conflict and erosion of civility between the other shapeshifting races.

==== Vampire ====
A world overrun by voracious vampires that forged together a dwindling resistance of mystical elves and hardened humans who were making their last stand against the vampires at the time of the Disruption.

Vampire: No longer human, these blood-thirsty leeches overtook their entire reality before being brought to The Crossworld.

Elf: Tall and lithe, elves of the Vampire reality revere the sun and harness the light it brings through their magicks.

Human: The most adaptable of all races. Humans are the most proficient race at utilizing social bonds for survival. More than any other race, humans can develop and specialize in many different ways, but have very few natural resistances to attacks.

Unclean: Rather than face death or being turned by the Vampires, the cowardly Unclean tainted themselves with dead Vampire Blood thereby making themselves unappealing to the Leeches but less than human.

==== Manifested ====
A world where all people manifest a distinct power (fire, ice, etc..) at some point in their lives. The later in life the power is manifested, the greater the power.

Fire: The Fire race of beings from the Manifested world can create and use fire in offensive and defensive attacks. Fire beings are known for their ambition and will use force as a means to achieving their goals. Once their goals are achieved, the people of Fire typically maintain peace through laws and structure instead of bloodshed.

Earth: The Earth race of beings from the Manifested world can use and manipulate the earth and terrain in offensive and defensive attacks. Mercurial and possessing great strength, the Earth race are a simple folk who often are ruled by their hearts instead of their intellect.

Water: The Water race of beings from the Manifested world can create and use water in offensive and defensive attacks. Water beings are typically even-keeled and calculating. They are not known for outright aggression, and prefer to stay as neutral as possible. However, if engaged, the water race will not hesitate to return aggression with decisive force.

Air: The Air race of beings from the Manifested world can use and manipulate the heavens in offensive and defensive attacks. The race of Air beings is generally a mischievous lot who enjoy wielding their power for their own amusement. They tend to be aloof and unconcerned with things that occur in the sea or on the land. Although they lack physical strength, air beings can inflict heavy damage with precise ranged attacks from great distances.

Gypsy: A disdained segment of society in the Manifested reality with strange and mysterious powers.

==== The Legion ====
A world that has been dominated by one militaristic society. From the lowliest Legion Squire to the most battle-tested Order Captain—all Legion units can be counted on for fierce discipline and precise execution.

Human: The most adaptable of all races. Humans are the most proficient race at utilizing social bonds for survival. More than any other race, humans can develop and specialize in many different ways, but have very few natural resistances to attacks.

Manoan: The Manoans are a peaceful, island people who possess great size and physical agility. Although docile as a race, Manoans engage in a brutal, physically demanding sport known as Quaila. Quaila matches are fiercely competitive with a loss resulting in the defeated team cutting their hair in shame.

Ravager: Once thought to be extinct, ravagers are a race of beings that was created through alchemical experiments gone horribly wrong. Huge, fast and vicious, Ravagers are almost unbeatable in melee combat. These feral beasts have sharp metal shards fused to their bodies that act as both armor and weapon.

Brynstan: For years, the Brynstans were simply a myth—something to scare children. Their proliferation went beyond their ability to remain clandestine, and eventually their dark alchemy led to the blighting of the Legion reality.
