= Chocolatier (video game) =

2007 video game

- Developer: Big Splash Games LLC
- Publisher: PlayFirst
- Series: Chocolatier
- Engine: Playground SDK
- Platforms: Windows, Mac OS X, Nintendo DS
- Release: May 1, 2007
- Genres: Business simulation, action
- Mode: Single-player

Chocolatier is a casual strategy video game with action game elements, developed by American studio Big Splash Games and published by PlayFirst. The game was released for download on May 1, 2007, and was followed by a CD-ROM release on September 27. Players assume the role of a young chocolatier, who must navigate 14 cities around the globe while buying ingredients, manufacturing chocolate confections, and selling them to chocolate shops. Two modes of play are available: in story mode the player must rebuild an almost-bankrupt chocolate empire and acquire 64 chocolate recipes from around the world; in free mode players start out with scant resources and must become successful chocolatiers.

Chocolatier was the first game developed by Big Splash Games, founded by a trio of video game designers who developed a prototype game in their spare time while still employed by an unknown publisher. This prototype was rejected by publishers, but after coming up with the premise of Chocolatier, the team was signed up by PlayFirst and completed the title. The game received a mostly positive reception: reviewers enjoyed the action minigame which is played when chocolates are manufactured, as well as the game's graphics, sound, and Victorian-era presentation.

== Gameplay ==
The player assumes the role of a young chocolatier in 1880, during the Victorian era. The game has two modes of play: story and free play. Story mode involves a number of quests, including delivering specific chocolates and restoring the fictional Baumeister chocolate empire to its former glory. The player is enlisted by Evangeline Baumeister to rebuild the Baumeister chocolate empire, which has been ruined by Evangeline's younger sister, who scattered chocolate recipes around the world. The player must locate the 64 lost recipes, visit 14 different cities around the globe, purchase six closed Baumeister factories, establish business relationships with outlets and suppliers, and manufacture chocolates to stay in business. Free play mode allows the player to travel, manufacture, and trade without undertaking quests. This mode starts the player with a small amount of cash and all chocolate recipes unlocked for use. In story mode, the player begins with a single factory and a recipe for simple chocolate bars. The player must visit the market to purchase ingredients and begin the manufacturing process.

The chocolate manufacturing process is an action minigame and a departure from the main game's economic simulation gameplay.

Each city has a chocolate shop where the player may sell chocolate and a market where ingredients can be purchased. Factories manufacturing chocolates produce a set amount of product every turn, as long as the required ingredients are in stock. During story mode, quests are given by non-player characters; these typically involve producing a particular volume and type of chocolate and delivering it to another non-player character, who is either traveling or can be found at a set location. Quest rewards take the form of a high price for the chocolates or a new recipe. Some encounters with characters give the player an opportunity to gamble a large amount of money on a dice roll. Market owners can be bargained with, though this carries the risk of them becoming irritated and raising prices rather than lowering them.

When producing a particular chocolate for the first time, a minigame is played where ingredients are fired from a cannon to fill circular trays which revolve around the cannon. The ingredients and quantities needed vary, depending on the recipe. Each time a circle is filled with the correct ingredients, it is removed and an empty circle put in its place. The trays spin faster as more circles are filled. If too many ingredients are wasted by misfiring the cannon, production is brought to a halt and the minigame must be attempted again. The minigame ends when the timer runs out; the number of completed circles is equal to the number of chocolates produced by that factory every week. The minigame cannot be played unless the player owns the correct ingredients. It can be replayed if the player wishes to try to improve the efficiency of the factory.

== Development ==
Tucson, Arizona-based Big Splash Games was formed in late 2005 by three people: Jon Blossom, Stephen Lewis, and Michael Wyman. They came together to produce a prototype for a casual video game. They developed it over a few months while on break. The prototype was pitched to a few publishers in order to gain feedback. PlayFirst, though not interested in the prototype, issued the team a request for proposal for an economic simulation game, hoping that Big Splash could produce another proposal. The next morning, Big Splash co-founder Stephen Lewis remembered that he had been told that some people, in particular women, "have an almost religious connection with chocolate". Taking this idea he quickly wrote a proposal and forwarded it to his two partners. After brainstorming the idea, the team decided that it satisfied PlayFirst's request for proposal, forwarded a copy of the idea and received word from the publisher that they "had hit the nail on the head".

Chocolatier was designed to appeal to women aged between 35 and 55, a different market compared to the games previously developed by the trio. In order to immerse themselves in the subject matter during development, Big Splash's staff tasted as many variety of chocolates as they could find and took the Scharffen Berger Chocolate Maker factory tour, where they witnessed the full "bean to bar" process. The factory mini-game was developed in order to give players a break from the economic side of the game, which involves buying low and selling high. It took approximately the same time to produce the mini-game as it did to create the rest of the game, which drained the developer's resources, though Stephen Lewis believed this was "the right decision". Journalists were sent Chocolatier-branded chocolate bars and "golden tickets" which allowed them to download the game for free, in order to promote the game's release. The game's sequel, Chocolatier 2: Secret Ingredients was first released in November 2007. Chocolatier: Decadence by Design is the third installment, released in 2009. The Great Chocolate Chase: A Chocolatier Twist was later released by PlayFirst.

== Reception ==
Reception

Review scores
Publication	Score
GameZone	6.5/10
Macworld	4/5
Gamezebo	4/5

Chocolatier was awarded Gamezebo's Zeeby award for best strategy game of 2007. GameZone's Anise Hollingshead found the game too easy, noting that "there really isn't a whole lot of thinking involved". Other reviewers called it "a delightfully challenging business tycoon game", and "challenging" but not much "frustrating". The game's graphics and sound received praise: Marc Saltzman noted "the game's wonderful art style and delightful music".

Reviewers praised the amount of freedom given to players. Didi Cardoso of website Grrl Gamer enjoyed the flexibility, but noted that sometimes she felt lost and was unsure of how to find the location of the next recipe. The chocolate manufacturing mini-game was also praised as "fun". Peter Cohen of Macworld noted that some fans of business simulators might find the mini-game "off-putting", but also suggested that it helped break up gameplay. Marc Saltzman expressed the same opinion, while Anise Hollingshead found the mini-game to be too easy to play.
