= Monster Garage (video game) =

2004 video game

- Xbox cover art
- Developers: Invictus Games; Impulse Games (Xbox)
- Publisher: Activision Value
- Producer: Tamás Kozák
- Programmers: Dénes Nagymáthé; Ákos Diviánszky; László Jávorszky; Zsolt Klampeczki; Attila Kocsis; Gábor Simon
- Artists: Tibor Mester; Csaba Csukás; József György Bakos; Ottó Feldmájer; János Váradi
- Composer: Szeg
- Platforms: Windows, Xbox
- Release: Windows; January 21, 2004; Xbox; November 3, 2004
- Genre: Simulation
- Mode: Single player

Monster Garage is a video game based on the TV show of the same name developed by Invictus Games and released by Activision Value for Windows and Xbox in 2004.

Monster Garage supported the ability to upload high scores to online leaderboards via Xbox Live.

== Reception ==
Monster Garage received generally unfavorable reviews according to website Metacritic. GameSpot panned it, saying that the "lack of any strategy to the gameplay, a generally poor design, and an endless number of stability problems turn Monster Garage into a real monster". GameZone says it might have some appeal for the fantasy of building vehicles, but "the time spent unscrewing bolts is disproportionately large compared to the time testing your creation".
