= Cracking the Conspiracy =

1998 video game

- Cover art
- Developer: Pixel Shop Inc.
- Publisher: Pixel Shop Inc.
- Designer: Brian & David Mennenoh
- Programmer: David Mennenoh
- Writer: David & Brian Mennenoh
- Engine: Macromedia Director
- Platform: Windows
- Release: 1998
- Genre: Adventure
- Mode: Single-player

Cracking the Conspiracy is a point-and-click adventure game released by Pixel Shop Inc. in 1998. The game focuses on science fiction and political secrets. A possible Macintosh version was planned, but never came to development due to lack of demand and Mac hardware.

== Plot ==
The player character called John is sent by a friend named Kelsey Hart to infiltrate Area 51 and uncover all secrets to expose to the world. John infiltrates the base via a uranium mine and goes undercover as a janitor.

== Gameplay ==
The game interface consists of a single-screen room, inventory box for storing usable items, a description box for describing the current room and a health bar for showing the player's vitality status. Occasionally when the player comes across a puzzle, that single screen will take up the whole screen, obscuring the other menu boxes. The player must take caution to avoid hostile security forces and aliens within the base area.

== Development ==
The Mennenoh brothers began working on the game in June 1996, aided by some friends and relatives throughout and finished by August 1998. The programming code used was Lingo with over 80,000 lines of code in the program. The audio was recorded and edited with Sound Forge.

=== Graphics ===
The 3D graphics were created using 3D Studio MAX R2. They started in Wireframe format. The modeling and rendering was done with Kinetix's 3D Studio MAX. Character animations were done with Character Studio. Image and Animation editing was done with Adobe Photoshop and Adobe Premiere respectively. The 3D animation was implemented with Adobe Director. The game had over 3,000 images and 358 videos using QuickTime.

== Reception ==
Reception

Review score
Publication	Score
Adventure Gamers	4/5
