= Chocolate Castle =

2007 video game

- Developer: Lexaloffle
- Publisher: Lexaloffle
- Platforms: Mac OS X, Windows, Linux
- Release: April 2, 2007
- Genre: Puzzle

Chocolate Castle is a puzzle video game developed by New Zealand–based company Lexaloffle and published on April 2, 2007. The game was developed by Lexaloffle's owner and operator Joseph White, who designed Chocolate Castle as a platform for further puzzle games. In this game, players clear a castle's rooms of chocolate by combining smaller pieces into large bars and commanding animals to consume them. After clearing a room, they can select new rooms that are still yet to be cleared. The full version of the game includes a room editor for players to create their own rooms; players may upload these newly created rooms to Lexaloffle's website for other players to attempt.

Most critics praised Chocolate Castle for its depth, for the option to create new rooms with the room editor, and for the ability to download rooms created by other players. The game's retro-styled graphics and sound received a mixed response. One reviewer expressed disappointment in the lack of music during gameplay, while others praised the attention to detail and graphical effects such as balloons and confetti showering the screen when the player clears a room.

== Gameplay ==
Chocolate Castle's core gameplay consists of a combination of mazes and sliding puzzles. The object of the game is to clear all blocks of chocolate in each room of a castle by getting anthropomorphic animals to eat them. Rooms are classed as easy, medium or hard. There are 120 rooms to complete in the full version of Chocolate Castle, with each difficulty level containing 40 puzzles. The trial version features 12 rooms. Rooms can be skipped if the player finds them too difficult, any moves made during play can be undone should the puzzle become unsolvable due to error. The full version contains a room editing program allowing players to create their own puzzles. Further rooms created by other players can be obtained from Lexaloffle's bulletin board system online.

Four varieties of chocolate are found scattered around the castle rooms' floors, along with four species of animal. Each animal type can only eat chocolate of the same color. The player must slide all of the chocolate pieces into large blocks before maneuvering the appropriate animal next to the bar in order to consume it. Animals can only eat one piece of chocolate of any size before being removed from play. Animals and chocolate can be dragged across rooms via the player's mouse. If players move two identical types of chocolate next to each other, either horizontally or vertically, they form a larger bar. Once the pieces of chocolate has been formed into larger bars, they cannot be separated again. Larger bars hinder the player by blocking access to different parts of the room; the effects of combinations must be considered before they are made.

== Development ==
Developer Joseph White began creating ASCII games on a BBC Micro computer at the age of 10, trying to reproduce arcade games such as Moon Patrol and Elevator Action in a more basic form. White released his first title as shareware, a puzzle game called Neko Puzzle during 1993, at the age of 14. The developer's next game offered for sale was not released until a decade later. White stated that most of his ideas for game design "come from things which have nothing to do with games", in an interview with Game Set Watch. When intentionally trying to come up with game design ideas he listens to chip music and studying pixel art.

White prototypes game ideas as soon as they occur; adding them to a smaller group of games in active development over time. Games moved from prototype to active development undergo "a lot of pixelling, coding, map designing, play testing and tweaking in no particular order." White stated he finds this is a good system for developing, since games "can sort of cross-pollinate", and development can be switched from one title to another. The negative aspect of this type of development is that the ratio between released and incomplete games "isn't so great." Both Chocolate Castle and Jasper's Journeys' development were overlapped this way, the former was developed as "a platform for designing mean puzzles."

== Reception ==
After completing a stage the screen is showered with confetti and balloons are released

Chocolate Castle was well received by independent gaming critics and placed third at indie game website Game Tunnel's 2007 Casual Game of the Year awards. The website's panel of reviewers also voted Chocolate Castle their Game of the Month for May 2007. Simon Carless, a video game journalist and developer writing for Kotaku said "The art style is adorable and the gameplay twistedly interesting—thumbs up". IndieGames.com writer Tim W. described it as "one of the better puzzle games I've ever played". Independent game developer Derek Yu praised the attention to detail in the game, in particular "the windows in the castle that light up as you complete stages, and the way the chocolate gets munched up and leaves crumbs".

The level editor's presence was noted by reviewers, as was the number of levels and the range of difficulty levels. Yu criticized the game's value, stating that "The full game costs $20 US...it's a little steep Mike Hommel of Game Tunnel said "I don't know how Lexaloffle does it" in reference to the number of levels and the level editor. Fellow Game Tunnel reviewer Caspian Prince said that the combination of "the huge number of puzzles" and the level editor "should extend its play life". NZGamer reviewer Reuben Ellett said "With over a hundred levels and the ability to build your own; Chocolate Castle is guaranteed to provide hours of fun and challenge to anyone of any age." Susie Ochs of MacLife agreed, saying "this is really the game that keeps on giving".

Chocolate Castle's graphics and music received mixed responses. Game Tunnel's reviewers were divided; Prince said "In Chocolate Castle we've got a slickly presented puzzle game polished to a sparkling shine", but John Bardinelli disagreed and stated the game "doesn't look like much at first glance". William Usher described the graphics as "simplistic", and the chip tune music as "nothing but 80's-gaming incarnate". Tim W. praised the graphics as "sharp", but stated that the game's lack of music during play was his only complaint; "some people can do without it, but it doesn't feel right to me without background music." Yu said "Joseph White's games are always brimming with charm and atmosphere, and Chocolate Castle is no exception!" Ochs said "This game's graphics, music, and sound effects won't blow you away, but they still exude a retro charm reminiscent of 8-bit Nintendo Entertainment System games".

Chocolate Castle's gameplay and longevity were praised by reviewers, regardless of their opinions of the game's presentation,. Ellett said "It may not have ground breaking graphics or music but it has got a lot of character...and chocolate." He found completing levels the most rewarding part of the game; "Balloons and glitter shoot up the screen and funky 8-bit music sounds your triumphant passing." Ellett also stated that the game was suitable for children "since it is addictive, rewarding, and stimulating", adding "You could even have it on your computer at work for a quick lunch break puzzle fix."
