= The History Channel: Battle for the Pacific =

2007 video game

The History Channel: Battle For the Pacific
- Cover art by Michel Bohbot
- Developers: Cauldron HQ (Note: Ported to Microsoft Windows by Ladyluck Digital Media.); Sand Grain Studios (PS2); Magic Wand Productions (Wii)
- Publisher: Activision
- Engine: CloakNT2
- Platforms: Microsoft Windows; PlayStation 2; Wii; Xbox 360; PlayStation 3
- Release: NA: December 4, 2007; NA: February 19, 2008 (PS3); EU: March 19, 2008 (Wii); AU: March 2008 (PC/PS2/X360); AU: April 9, 2008 (PS3/Wii); EU: April 11, 2008
- Genre: First-person shooter
- Modes: Single-player, multiplayer

The History Channel: Battle for the Pacific is a 2007 historical first-person shooter video game developed by Cauldron HQ and published by Activision for Microsoft Windows, Xbox 360 and PlayStation 3. Versions for PlayStation 2 and Wii by different developers were also released, featuring a different storyline and missions.

Battle for the Pacific allows players to participate in battles in the Pacific Theater of Operations of World War II, such as the Battle of Iwo Jima and the Battle of Corregidor.

== Gameplay ==
Battle for the Pacific features a single-player campaign and a multiplayer mode with various weapons to choose from, ranging from the American Thompson submachine gun and M1 Garand rifle to the Japanese Type 100 submachine gun and Type 38 carbine.

=== Single-player ===
The game features fighting in some of the most historic battles in the Pacific campaign, from the Battle of Corregidor and Guadalcanal to the closing days of Iwo Jima. While the PlayStation 2 and Wii versions have the player by his lonesome, similar to the early Medal of Honor games, the Xbox 360, PlayStation 3, and PC version features more squad-based missions, with most all of the missions having two soldiers and an NCO by your side, with other soldiers helping out as well. The game seems to have large, lush environments, from the beaches to the jungle, However one noticeable aspect in the PS3, Xbox 360, and PC version is that the player can not wander too far off from the commanding soldier, or else the mission will be terminated. This limits free roaming and creates a more linear single-player experience.

== Synopsis ==
=== PlayStation 2/Wii adaptation ===
The game starts out in 1942, with the main character saying that his reward for taking part in a special forces operation in Luxembourg is to serve in the Pacific War. He is part of a special forces group, and is a one-man-army. First, he is ordered to deliver a telegram to General Douglas MacArthur, fighting his way through the jungles of Corregidor to get to a PT boat that brings him to MacArthur. Afterwards, he serves on Guadalcanal, where he takes part in the Battle of Tulagi and Gavutu-Tanambogo, where he blows up a Japanese seaplane base, and later takes part in the destruction of Henderson Field, calling in airstrikes on key buildings. As a reward for his services, he was sent to Australia for R&R, but before he could do so, he was caught up in the Battle of Milne Bay, where he escaped New Guinea with important documents after blowing up Japanese Zeroes with an AA gun. He goes to Australia, and returns to duty when he is sent to Buna-Gona to steal communication codes from beach houses. He finds a dead Japanese officer, and the officer's suicide troubles the main character mentally, as he is confused about it. After this mission, he is sent to Truk to search for communication codes. The next missions involve him heading to Guam to save POWs from a camp and going to Tinian to call in airstrikes on key storehouses that the naval bombardment missed. Finally, he is sent to Iwo Jima to blow up huge artillery pieces in Mt. Suribachi, and the story ends there.

== Reception ==
Reception

Review score
Publication	Score
Official Xbox Magazine (US)	3.0/10

Upon release, History Channel: Battle for the Pacific received generally unfavorable reviews. On GameRankings, it ranges from 30 to 50%, and on Metacritic, the Xbox 360 version received 38 out of a 100.

IGN gave the Xbox 360 and PC versions a 4.5/10 and 4.9/10 respectively, citing its lack of story, repetitious gameplay and short game length, while the Wii and PS2 version suffered even more with scores of 2.5 and 3, due to bad graphics, bad narration, and overall being worse than the Xbox 360 and PC versions.

GameSpot also gave the game a negative review, with the Xbox 360 version receiving a 2/10, the Wii version receiving a 4/10, and the PS2 version with 4.5/10, mainly due to many factors including short game length and derivative gameplay for the Xbox 360, while the PS2 and Wii version had bad graphics, inconsistency with the framerate, and poor artificial intelligence.

ScrewAttack's "The Scoop" said that the game had "horrible graphics, poor online multiplayer, bad music, and a lack of a sprint feature."
