= Replication (optical media) =

In optical disc manufacturing, replication is the process of producing discs via methods that do not involve "burning" blank CD, DVD or other discs; the latter is known as duplication.

The replication of optical discs involves:

1. the creation of a glass master from a client original master.
2. the creation of a nickel stamper from that glass master.
3. the injection molding of clear optical-grade polycarbonate substrates (clear discs) from that stamper.
4. the metallizing and lacquering of those substrates to produce compact discs and DVDs.
