= Robot Arena =

- Genre: Action game
- Developer: Gabriel Entertainment
- Publishers: Infogrames, Octopus Tree (2016)
- Platform: Microsoft Windows
- First release: Robot Arena; March 24, 2001
- Latest release: Robot Arena 3 May 26, 2016

Robot Arena is an action video game series focused on robot building and fighting. It is based on television shows such as Robot Wars and Battlebots. There are three games in the series, Robot Arena released in 2001, Robot Arena 2: Design and Destroy released in 2003, and Robot Arena 3 released in 2016.

== Games ==
=== Robot Arena ===
Robot Arena was the first game in the series to be released. The objective was to build a robot using available parts and enter competitions to try and win. The player first chose a chassis, then added batteries, weapons and armour, only being able to choose what they could afford from the amount of money that they had.

The game received mostly negative reviews. IGN gave it a 4.3 out of 10 writing "While it's prettier than most budget titles, it also suffers from the vacancy that so often comes with nice looking people, dogs, or mechanical monsters. It looks great standing still, but give it a complicated task and it all goes to pieces". GameSpot wrote "Even at the low retail cost of $19.99, Robot Arena isn't worth it. You'd end up getting more entertainment if you randomly chose two movies at an over-priced movie theater".

=== Robot Arena 2: Design and Destroy ===
Robot Arena 2: Design and Destroy (or just Robot Arena 2 or RA2 as most people called it) was released two years after the original. In late 2001, a tech demo was released by Infogrames as a promotional release for the game. It was merely an open sandbox where the player could control three robots. It contained two flippers, a saw blade, some barrels, an oil slick, two open pits, and two platforms that could be driven onto. When the game was released officially, it had fixed many of the previous games issues. The funding system used in order to build a robot was scrapped entirely, as players could now choose any weapons or batteries for free. Chassis available to use were also scrapped in favor of the player now being able to draw their own chassis, also being able to angle sides to make wedges. The robots were now built more realistically and the difficulty on each was now varied instead of all the robots acting the same way as they did in the first game. The game also introduced the Havok physics engine, which meant that robots were now able to leave the ground so flippers and wedges could be used effectively.

The game received mostly positive reviews. GameSpy gave it 77 out of 100 writing "A pleasant surprise. Whether you're going head-to-head against formidable AI bots or human opponents, it has plenty to offer both newcomers and bot-bashing aficionados alike".

=== Robot Arena 3 ===
Robot Arena 3 (stylised as Robot Arena III) was quietly announced in May 2015, using the header: "Create. Destruction," replacing the old Robot Arena 2 information on the website. However it wouldn't be until March 2016, when the game was officially announced to the public. Infogrames did not publish this installment as publication was under the new publishing house Octopus Tree, a branch of Encore Publishing Group. Robot Arena 3 was released on Steam on May 26, 2016, thirteen years after Robot Arena 2 was released. It has also been released on DVD-ROM

Robot Arena 3 is built in the Unity 5 game engine; however, the developers encountered a setback with vehicular movement, eventually designing their own vehicle physics to accommodate a robot that has been flipped upside down.

The game was panned heavily after release. "Early Access" players have complained about the clunky building, broken AI, lack of weight classes, glitched online, and not being able to edit a robot after it has been uploaded to the Steam workshop. The game has now been released fully and while players think it is better than it was in Early Access, they still believe the game is a disappointment.
