= Cabela's Ultimate Deer Hunt 2 =

2002 video game

- Developer: Sylum Entertainment, Ltd.
- Publisher: Activision Value
- Platform: Windows
- Release: September, 2002
- Genre: Sports

Cabela's Ultimate Deer Hunt 2 is the first sequel to Cabela's Ultimate Deer Hunt. It was developed by Sylum Entertainment, Ltd. and released in September 2002.

The game was published by Activision Value in conjunction with the hunting supply company Cabela's.
