= Caterpillar Construction Tycoon =

2005 video game

- Developer: Gabriel Entertainment
- Publisher: Activision Value: EU: Zoo Digital Publishing
- Platform: Windows
- Release: NA: September 15, 2005; PAL: March 3, 2006
- Genre: Business simulation
- Mode: Single player

Caterpillar Construction Tycoon is a business simulation game in which the player manages multiple construction sites. It was developed by Gabriel Entertainment, and published by Activision Value on September 15, 2005, for the PC. The object of this game, as in all tycoon computer games, is to become a tycoon, and in this case, a Construction Tycoon.

== Gameplay ==
In this game, players must successfully manage different construction facilities around the world. In order to keep it running smoothly, they must draft Caterpillar Construction vehicles in addition to managing their employees time schedules and salaries.
