= Chocolatier: Decadence by Design =

2009 video game

- Developer: Big Splash Games LLC
- Publisher: PlayFirst
- Producer: Michael Thornton Wyman
- Designers: Jon Blossom; Stephen Lewis; Michael Thornton Wyman
- Programmer: Jon Blossom
- Artist: Stephen Lewis
- Series: Chocolatier
- Engine: Playground SDK™
- Platforms: Microsoft Windows; Mac OS X iOS
- Release: Mac, Windows; January 22, 2009 iOS; January 28, 2011
- Genres: Business simulation, strategy
- Mode: Single-player

Chocolatier: Decadence by Design is a casual strategy video game with action elements, developed by Big Splash Games LLC and published by PlayFirst. The game was released in 2009 for Windows and Mac OS X and in 2011 for iOS. As the third game in the series, it directly follows the story of Chocolatier (2007) and Chocolatier 2: Secret Ingredients (2007), and was published after the spin-off game The Great Chocolate Chase: A Chocolatier Twist (2008). Decadence by Design features similar gameplay to its predecessors, but with a greater focus on creating original recipes and the possibility of making coffee recipes, both liquid and as blends of roasted beans.

Originally, Big Splash Games had planned an episodic release for Chocolatier: Decadence by Design, a model that had to be abandoned due to technological limitations. On 12 August 2009, the game was published on Steam for Windows, and it was also made available at the launch of the digital platform for Mac on May 12, 2010. In 2010, a social network game spin-off from the series entitled Chocolatier: Sweet Society was published on Facebook.

== Gameplay and plot ==
While Chocolatier was set in the 1880s and Chocolatier 2: Secret Ingredients was set in the 1920s, Chocolatier: Decadence by Design is set during the period of economic growth that followed the end of the Second World War, in the second half of the 1940s. As in the second game, the player must team up with Alexandra Fletcher, (Note: Sometimes referred to as Alexandra Tangye or Alexandra Baumeister.) Evangeline Baumeister's granddaughter, this time to become CEO of Baumeister Confections. At the same time, the player must help her find her husband, Sean Fletcher, who hasn't returned home after the end of the war. Unlike its predecessors, Decadence by Design includes only one game mode, the Story Mode, with no option for Free Play.

The main addition to Decadence by Design is the possibility of creating and customising the appearance and name of new recipes with ingredients discovered in different cities around the world. The taste laboratory, this time located in Reykjavík, is no longer limited to pre-defined recipes, unlike in Chocolatier 2. There are 20 ports available in the game: Baghdad, Bali, Bogotá, Cape Town, Douala, Falkland Islands, Gobi Desert, Havana, Kailua-Kona, Las Vegas, Lima, Reykjavík, San Francisco, Tangier, Tokyo, Toronto, Uluru, Wellington, Xunantunich and Zurich. It is still possible to haggle with sellers and buyers in markets and shops.

The minigame played when making a chocolate recipe for the first time is still present, but with some factories allowing you to recycle an item that isn't useful at the moment. Moreover, the minigame for making coffee is different, resembling a tile-matching game. The system of matching colours to get bonuses, introduced in Chocolatier 2, is still present. Some shops in the game exclusively buy coffee, but no chocolate, such as the one in Tangiers. At a certain point during the story mode, the player can buy a telegraph, allowing the recipes made in each of the factories to be changed remotely.

== Reception ==
Reception

Review scores
Publication	Score
Gamezebo	4.5/5
Slide to Play	4/4

Critics praised Chocolatier: Decadence by Design's polished gameplay, its story, and the possibilities provided by the taste lab. On the other hand, the similarity to the first game and the lack of a real ending or post-game content were criticised. Some also highlighted the game's low difficulty.

Gamezebo's Marc Saltzman said that although he wished "there were a few more delicious surprises" in the game, "Chocolatier: Decadence by Design returns to its roots and proves to be [...] very entertaining and challenging." The journalist praised the creation of original recipes in the taste lab, wishing it were possible to share his creations with other players on an online platform. Parisa Vassei, from Slide to Play, praised the game as superior to its competitors on the App Store, stating that it "offered a unique approach to this style of gameplay with a fascinating plot and delicious story", while lamenting the lack of Game Center integration.
