= Cabela's Trophy Bucks =

2007 video game

- Xbox 360 cover art
- Developers: Fun Labs (Xbox 360); Magic Wand Productions (Wii); Sand Grain Studios (PS2)
- Publisher: Activision Value
- Platforms: Microsoft Windows, PlayStation 2, Wii, Xbox 360
- Release: September 25, 2007
- Genres: Sports, first-person shooter

Cabela's Trophy Bucks is a hunting simulation video game, in which a player can track and stalk a variety of trophy deer over 24 states and provinces across North America. Species includes whitetail, Rocky Mountain mule deer, sitka, desert mule deer, Columbian black tail and many others.

The game was published by Activision Value in conjunction with hunting supply company Cabela's.
