= Cloudheim =

- Developer: Noodle Cat Games
- Publisher: Noodle Cat Games
- Platforms: PlayStation 5; Windows; Xbox Series X/S
- Release: TBA
- Genre: Action RPG
- Modes: Single-player, Multiplayer

Cloudheim is a cooperative action role-playing game developed and published by Noodle Cat Games. Set in a Norse-inspired world, players control ancient warriors to restore the world after Ragnarök. It features gameplay systems that alternate between combat and base building.

The game was released for Windows as early access on 4 December 2025. A full release as well as console release for PlayStation 5 and Xbox Series X/S was planned for 2026.

== Premise ==
Players take role of ancient warriors who have been revived to help restore the Norse-inspired world after Ragnarök.

== Gameplay ==
Cloudheim is an action role-playing game that supports online cooperative gameplay. The game is playable as either solo or up to 4-player multiplayer. The game is based on fast-paced combat fighting numerous enemies, and players are able to use various abilities like dodge or triple jump. Every ability is limited by a certain number of charges, and players spend past the point, it will build up the "mana burn" meter which, if filled up, will slow down the player character and make them lose access to any abilities.

The game additionally features a base-building system that takes place on a flying turtle named Odin's Shell, where you can build crafting devices, specialized structures, and decorations. Players can craft a range of weaponry and equipment, which are able to conjure effects like tornadoes or explosions. Little critters named Blins can be assigned to certain places to perform jobs like creating materials for crafting.

A shop can be set up on Odin's Shell, which can sell products to non-playable characters and earn currency. A variety of improvements to the shop, like displaying correct items or housing decorative banners, can influence shopper behavior and increase profits. The shop system is used for further progressing the building system.

== Development and release ==
Cloudheim is a debut title by Noodle Cat Games, a development studio founded by former developers from Epic Games, Electronic Arts, Codemasters, Disney, and Bioware. David Hunt, CEO and founder of the company, described the game as a co-op action RPG with the "juggling from fighting games".

The game was announced in February 2025 for PlayStation 5, Windows, and Xbox Series X/S. A free demo was published temporarily in October 2025, letting players experience the first two chapters in the storyline. The game was launched in early access for Windows via Steam and Epic Games Store on 4 December. Noodle Cat Games have launched limited-time events for Cloudheim, with the first Frostfall winter event updated to the game on 27 December 2025.

A full release for the consoles and PC was planned for 2026.
