= Gabriel Entertainment =

Indiana video game developer

- Founded: 1999
- Headquarters: Decatur, United States
- Website: http://gabrielentertainment.com/

Gabriel Entertainment (part of Gabriel Group) is a video game developer based in Indianapolis, Indiana, USA, and was founded in 1999 as Gabriel Interactive by Michael Root (president). Greg Phillips is vice president. In addition to developing commercial business simulation games, the company has also developed educational games for the Children's Museum of Indianapolis.

== Games ==
- Through The Starburst Window → 2000
- Robot Arena → 2001
- Dr. Rottenbones & The Factory of Flab → 2001
- X-Ray Imaging → 2002
- Robot Arena 2: Design and Destroy → 2003
- Construction-Destruction → 2003
- John Deere: American Farmer → 2004
- Super Stunt Spectacular → 2005
- Caterpillar Construction Tycoon → 2005
- John Deere: Busy Days in Deerfield Valley → 2005
- John Deere: Welcome to Merriweather Farm → 2005
- John Deere: North American Farmer → 2005
- John Deere: American Builder Deluxe → 2006
- John Deere: American Farmer Deluxe → 2006
- Ride! Carnival Tycoon → 2007
- Rock Tour → 2008
- Robot Arena 3 → 2016
