= Construction-Destruction =

2003 video game

- Developer(s): Gabriel Entertainment
- Publisher(s): ValuSoft
- Engine: Proprietary/Custom; Physics: Havok
- Platform(s): Windows
- Release: 2003
- Genre(s): Construction game

Construction-Destruction (C-D) is a 2003 construction simulation game for Windows, developed by Gabriel Entertainment and published by ValuSoft.

Construction-Destruction features various construction vehicles (which act as the player character) that can move various objects, including dirt, via the physics engine, Havok. The vehicles each have separate controllable features like the arm, bed, bucket, ball, fork, hook, and cab rotation.

== Vehicles ==
- Bulldozer
- Crane
- Dump truck
- Excavator
- Front-end loader

== Levels ==
Levels are various construction sites like empty lots, a quarry, a street, etc.
