= Crying Is Not Enough =

2018 video game

- Storefront art
- Developer: Storyline Team
- Publisher: Storyline Team
- Designer: Akis Olsey Mila
- Programmer: Akis Olsey Mila
- Artist: Konstantinos Poulis
- Writer: Akis Olsey Mila
- Engine: Unity
- Platform: Windows
- Release: 15 June 2018
- Genres: Survival horror, action-adventure
- Mode: Single-player

Crying Is Not Enough is a survival horror action-adventure video game developed and published by Greek independent developers Akis Olsey Mila and Konstantinos Poulis under the collective name of "Storyline Team". The story follows 35-year-old Jacob Helten as he tries to unravel the mystery of his wife's disappearance after a horrific car accident. The game was developed over the course of five years and was released on Steam on 15 June 2018.

== Gameplay ==
The player controls the protagonist, Jacob Helten, from a third-person perspective, and has to traverse through a bizarre, death-filled world that is home to grotesque monsters. Players use firearms in order to defeat enemies, reminiscent of the Silent Hill series of games. Apart from gathering weapons and battling the mutated patients inhabiting the island, players are also tasked with solving Resident Evil-style puzzles.

== Plot ==
The game tells the story of a 35-year-old man named Jacob Helten, whose wife Claire is being treated in a hospital after suffering a serious injury in a car accident. As Claire's health continuously improves over the next few weeks, and she is about to get discharged, she vanishes from the hospital. Following his wife's disappearance, Jacob is approached by an unknown elderly woman, who claims to have knowledge of Claire's whereabouts and offers to help Jacob find her.

Jacob boards a helicopter on the roof of the hospital and soon finds himself on a mysterious distant island filled with nightmarish creatures and toxic waste. He is faced with a series of puzzles to solve in order to make progress and slowly uncovers a far darker plot, filled with hatred, fear and intrigue.

== Development ==
The game began pre-alpha in 2013, when two friends, Akis Olsey Mila and Konstantinos Poulis set out to create their own video game. At the end of the year they had their game cleared the Steam Greenlight process.

In 2015, due to the developers' limited resources and disappointing pre-alpha test results, Mila and Poulis, decided to keep up with the technological requirements of the latest generation consoles, starting the entire development from scratch. The game was eventually released on Steam in June 2018. Reportedly, PlayStation 4 and Xbox One versions were being planned for release on the third quarter of 2018, but have since received no official release date.

In April 2019, the game received a 'mass update' on Steam, containing a multitude of bug fixes and many tweaks to the game based on player feedback. The update also included new cut-scenes, effects and game-play elements, such as an in-game map and visible quest objectives. The game's listing on Steam was also re-titled as Crying Is Not Enough: Remastered.

In 2021, the ability to purchase the game was disabled from the Steam storefront. As of December 2023 the game remains unavailable, although a free demo for the game is still visible and available for download.

== Reception ==
Reception for Crying Is Not Enough has been mixed. The game was well received in its home country, where it received the "People's Choice Award" during the Athens Games Festival, as well as being voted as "Greek Game of the Year" by Greek media and entertainment website GameWorld.gr users in its annual Game of the Year Awards 2018. On the other hand, it received mostly negative reviews upon its release on Steam, while American YouTuber Angry Joe listed Crying Is Not Enough at third place in his "Worst Games of 2018" list.

=== Accolades ===
Year	Award	Category	Result	Ref
2018	Gameworld.gr Game of the Year Awards	Greek Game of the Year	Won	
