= Seven Lights =

Multiplayer online game developer

- Company type: Private
- Industry: Video games
- Founded: 2002
- Defunct: 2011
- Headquarters: Chicago, Illinois
- Key people: Tim Harris, CEO; Mike McCarthy, CCO; Dave Shuck, COO
- Products: The Continuum, Corporate Bloodbath, The Pulse Gate
- Website: http://www.sevenlights.com (offline)

Seven Lights was a privately held, American developer/publisher of multiplayer online games headquartered in Chicago, Illinois.

== History ==
Early in 2002, founders Tim Harris, Mike McCarthy and Dave Shuck conceived a game development process for hardcore games done entirely in the browser, using Flash technology. The idea, as Harris told Firing Squad as the company announced itself, was that they had "accumulated a ton of ideas about the way that the Internet can create new and different takes on the games we've all played. We looked at the overhead required to get into the games business in a "traditional" way and thought, 'Wait a minute... we can take a different angle.' That angle is to create extremely lean development teams and launch in the web environment to give ourselves the ability to create a constant stream of new content, iterate the game experience itself and ultimately build game franchises from the ground up with the players helping guide us every step of the way."

The team began working on their first title, The Continuum, an online collectible wargame with characters that develop in an RPG-type fashion. To facilitate the creation of many games in this vein, the company created a real-time content management system so that new characters, abilities, equipment and battle maps could be introduced in a much quicker fashion than the typical development cycle for game expansions. This platform was completed prior to the introduction of The Continuum, and is forming the basis for all future Seven Lights games.

The Continuum, which launched in June 2008 and is introducing its first expansion in August 2008, represents a leap forward for hardcore gaming in the browser and it features an extremely deep level "of customization that users can put into the building and fine-tuning of their armies, but this is all just buildup to the game itself, which consists of a turn based one-on-one war. The battle system uses tiles to determine how far each character can move, and each action (be it attack, cast a spell, or any number of special abilities) is activated through an onscreen menu."

The Continuum was officially shut down in 2011. In 2012, Tim Harris was announced as a cofounder of mobile studio Industrial Toys. The studio was acquired by Electronic Arts in 2018 and shut down in 2023.

== See also ==
- Multiplayer Online Games
- Role Playing Games
