= Cyber Groove =

2000 video game

- Developer(s): Front Fareast Industrial Corporation
- Platform(s): Windows
- Release: January 2000
- Genre(s): Dance
- Mode(s): Single-player, Multiplayer

Cyber Groove (known as 熱舞2000 or Dance 2000 in Chinese) is a Taiwanese dancing game, by Front Fareast Industrial Corporation, played on a Microsoft Windows computer. It was released in January 2000, and can be played on either the keyboard or a dance pad.

== Gameplay ==

Gameplay is similar to Dance Dance Revolution. Arrows (up, down, left and right) scroll from bottom to top. The player must step on the corresponding arrow when it reaches the top of the screen, where stationary arrows (referred to as the Step Zone in DDR terminology) are located. In the background of the game play region, a random, non-selectable dancing character can be seen. Each genre of song will have its own unique character.

In addition to Dance mode, there exist four gameplay styles which utilize different elements of the pad (or pads), two of which must be unlocked through gameplay. Together mode, where two players play on the same pad, utilizes all eight directional arrows to make the players move in a synchronized pattern. Double mode uses two pads for a single player, with the four main directionals for a total of eight panels. Extra mode (a secret mode) uses the four main directionals, plus the up-right and up-left arrows, similar to Dance Dance Revolution Solo. Jam mode (a secret mode) has extra visual effects and background audio clips with no change to gameplay.

Cyber Groove includes 21 songs, most of which are licensed, and 50 additional songs are available for download from the Front Fareast website.

== Cyber Groove Dance Pad ==
The game pad is a USB-only pad with 10 "panels": up, down, left and right arrows, along with a circle in the up-left position, an X in the up-right position, a square in the bottom-left position, and a triangle in the bottom-right position. It also has Escape (ESC) and pause buttons that when pressed simultaneously exit the game.

== Reception ==
Kevin Rice reviewed the PC version of the game for Next Generation, rating it four stars out of five, and stated that "Those who've envied the 'really good dancers' at the arcade no longer have an excuse not to play this game – there's no embarrassment from the glow of the monitor. And it's a great workout."

IGN gave the game a negative review, saying that "If you're in the mood for something to keep you musically entertained, I suggest you take out your Melvins album and try banging your head against the wall in time with the base drum instead."

== See also ==
- Dance Dance Revolution
- In the Groove
- StepMania
