= Cabela's Alaskan Adventures =

2006 video game

- PC cover art
- Developers: Fun Labs (XB360); Magic Wand Productions (PC); Sand Grain Studios (PS2)
- Publisher: Activision
- Designers: Cristian Gabriel Radu; Deodar Popa
- Engine: Proprietary
- Platforms: PlayStation 2, Windows, Xbox 360
- Release: PS2, XB360: NA: September 19, 2006; EU: November 16, 2006 (X360); EU: January 12, 2007 (PS2); WIN: NA: September 26, 2006
- Genre: sports
- Mode: single-player

Cabela's Alaskan Adventures (also known as Cabela's Big Game Hunter: 10th Anniversary Edition – Alaskan Adventure for Windows) is a 2006 hunting video game developed by Sand Grain Studios, Fun Labs and Magic Wand Productions and published by Activision for the Xbox 360 and PlayStation 2 video game consoles and Microsoft Windows. In April 2017, the Xbox 360 version was made backwards compatible with the Xbox One.

== Gameplay ==
The game features twelve different maps, including different regions in Alaska and the Arctic, where players may track or lure animals to complete goals. Numerous animals are available to hunt – bears such as the grizzly bear, black bear, glacier bear and polar bear appear from the tutorial onwards. Other hostile animals include coyotes, wolverines, Canada lynx, Arctic wolves, grey wolves, musk oxen, and bison. Roosevelt elk, Yukon moose and mountain goats are available to hunt, as well as Dall sheep, stone sheep, barren-ground caribou, and Sitka deer. Birds include Canada geese, harlequin ducks, spruce grouse, and ptarmigans. Small mammals include red foxes, Arctic foxes, and snowshoe hares. Players may also practice fishing, either with fishing rods or in the form of ice fishing with tip-ups. Money from successful hunts can be used to purchase better equipment including firearms and camping equipment. The game includes fines, which subtract money from the player if certain hunting laws are breached, such as firing a weapon too close to an occupied building.

== Reception ==
Reception

Aggregate score
Aggregator	Score
Metacritic	48/100

Review scores
Publication	Score
IGN	4.8/10
TeamXbox	6.4/10

Cabela's Alaskan Adventures received mixed to negative reviews from critics. On Metacritic, the Xbox 360 version of the game holds a score of 48/100 based on 11 reviews.

Erik Brudvig of IGN rated the game a 4.8/10, criticizing the game for being a "sloppy port" and for its gameplay being "outside the realms of pure simulation and arcade fun". Dale Nardozzi of TeamXbox was more lenient on the game, rating it a 6.4/10, praising the gameplay and graphics as being "pretty decent" for a budget game.
