= The Cameron Files: Pharaoh's Curse =

2002 video game

- Developer: Galilea
- Publishers: NA: DreamCatcher Interactive; EU: The Adventure Company
- Platform: Windows
- Release: NA: October 31, 2002; FRA: March 18, 2003
- Genre: Adventure
- Mode: Single-player

The Cameron Files: Pharaoh's Curse (known in Europe as Amenophis: Resurrection) is an adventure video game released in 2002, developed by Galilea and published by DreamCatcher Interactive and The Adventure Company.

The game is set in Egypt in the year 1936 and the Pharaoh's mummy, on display in the Cairo Museum of Antiquities, has mysteriously disappeared. The players have to solve puzzles and talk to various characters, in order to unravel a dark conspiracy laced with supernatural undertones. The game's locations include the Museum, the river Nile and the Egyptian sands.

It is the second game in The Cameron Files series, following The Cameron Files: Secret at Loch Ness.

== Reception ==
Reception

Aggregate score
Aggregator	Score
Metacritic	57/100

Review scores
Publication	Score
Adventure Gamers	3.5/5
GameSpot	5.1/10
GameZone	8/10

The game received "mixed" reviews, more so than its predecessor, according to video game review aggregator Metacritic.
