= Cabela's Big Game Hunter 2005 Adventures =

2004 video game

- North American Windows cover art
- Developers: Magic Wand Productions (Note: Ported to Xbox by Fun Labs Romania and to PS2 by Sand Grain Studios.); Torus Games (GBA)
- Publishers: NA: Activision Value; EU: Zoo Digital Publishing
- Platforms: Windows, Xbox, PlayStation 2, GameCube, Game Boy Advance
- Release: September 9, 2004: Windows; NA: September 9, 2004 PlayStation 2, Game Boy Advance; NA: November 12, 2004; PAL: 2004 Xbox; NA: November 23, 2004; PAL: October 14, 2005 GameCube; NA: December 10, 2004
- Genres: First-person shooter, sports
- Modes: Single-player, multiplayer

Cabela's Big Game Hunter 2005 Adventures is a 2004 hunting video game published by Activision Value for Microsoft Windows, Xbox, GameCube, PlayStation 2, and Game Boy Advance. It is also a backwards-compatible title for the Xbox 360. It is the first story-driven hunting adventure game.

== Gameplay ==
In the Career mode, players progress through six geographical regions, each with several sub-levels: Forest, Marsh, Desert, Prairie, Mountain, and Tundra. Each sub-level has a specific animal to hunt, though some animals are hunted multiple times on separate occasions, and occasionally the player will encounter other objectives within a level. Money is earned along the way, which can be spent on more advanced firearms and other equipment. A few opportunities will arise for the player to win a gun by completing certain tasks. A total of 26 different animal species can be hunted in the game, including white-tailed deer, timberwolves, and peccary.

Other play modes include Quick Hunt, starting with one sub-level per region; other levels become available as they are completed in the Career mode, and Tournaments, including skeet shooting.

For full information on the console version of the 2005 Adventures, see Cabela's Big Game Hunter 2006 Trophy Season. The PC version of the 2006 Season is identical to the console version of the 2005 Adventures.

=== Windows ===
The Windows version of the game operates much differently, and allows the player to select locations and unlock them upon their completion. It operates exactly like its predecessor, Cabela's Big Game Hunter: 2004 Season. The game includes 10 maps located across North America. The maps are much more diverse and unique than those of the 2004 Season. Unlike the previous game, each map can only be played in two seasons. The seasons in question depend on the map. Each season features a different game from the other one, requiring the player to play all but one of the maps twice in order to complete the game. The game also imposes firearm restrictions based on each season in each map. The most prevalent restrictions are those that allow either rifles and shotguns or those that allow any weapon of choice. Other locations include bow-only seasons, and one includes a shotgun-only season. The player may only carry two weapons on each hunt. There are a total of 26 game mammals to hunt.

The player will always have to purchase tags before a hunt. Only one instance of each tag may be purchased per hunt. Game that must be hunted in instances of two or four can only be purchased in those quantities. The player must also have no more than two firearms coinciding with restriction in the area and season and clothing to enter the hunting area. The player will always load into a location with a brief visual, bearing the location name, longitudinal and latitudinal coordinates, a spinning compass, and a photo of the location in the selected season. The player will have four spawn points to choose from at the menu, however the exact location cannot be chosen. The spawn points are set to a position on the map. The player will always spawn next to their vehicle (with the exception of Yukon Territory), and the player will always start a hunt at the beginning of hunting hours with clear skies. The player cannot choose the time of day or weather to begin the hunt at.

Game will always spawn throughout the map, however in differing quantities every hunt. There will always be at least one of each animal in the selected season. No less than the minimum variety of animals will spawn in a level upon loading. No more than twelve will spawn in any level. Game that requires multiple trophies per level will not have an effect on the spawn rate. For example, a player will need to bag four coyotes in one level. It is possible for only one coyote to spawn per level, requiring the player to find the next target when it respawns. Some animals may spawn within close proximity of the player; if it is a hostile animal, the player has a small chance of being attacked upon spawn.

The player will receive money for each trophy bagged, depending on distance, weapon used, and point(s) of impact. The player will also receive a clean shot bonus if the trophy is bagged in one shot. The player uses money to buy tags for each location ($200 each), as well as more firearms and bows, and more equipment as needed.

When the player wades into water deeper than waist-level, they will automatically swim and the same controls for walking apply. The player may not equip a weapon or use any items while in the water. If the player drives their vehicle into the water, they will not be able to recover the vehicle without restarting the hunt.

Any objects that the player uses – besides their weapons – will not actually be shown, even in third person. Calls, lures, food, water, medical bags, and scent cover will only play a fixed sound and give the desired effect when used. Decoys, tripod stands, tree stands, ground blinds, and various lures and baits will be shown in front of the player when used, but there is no animation for these objects.

The player only takes damage from being attacked by animals, drowning, crashing their vehicle, or overextending themselves physically when they have no energy. The player will not take fall damage from any height, walking into cacti or other natural entities, and falling into water.
