= World Series of Poker 2008: Battle for the Bracelets =

2007 video game

- Developer(s): Left Field Productions
- Publisher(s): Activision
- Composer(s): Randall Ryan
- Platform(s): Xbox 360, PlayStation 2, PlayStation 3, PlayStation Portable, Nintendo DS, Microsoft Windows
- Release: September 25, 2007: NA: September 25, 2007 (PS2, PS3); NA: September 26, 2007 (X360); NA: October 30, 2007 (PC); NA: November 6, 2007 (DS, PSP); AU: November 21, 2007 (PS2); AU: November 22, 2007 (DS, PC, PS3); AU: November 28, 2007 (X360); EU: November 30, 2007 (PS2, X360); EU: December 7, 2007 (PS3); AU: December 12, 2007 (PSP); EU: December 14, 2007 (PSP); EU: January 11, 2008 (DS)
- Genre(s): Card game
- Mode(s): Single-player, multiplayer

World Series of Poker 2008: Battle for the Bracelets is a video game based on the popular gambling tournament World Series of Poker. It is the sequel to World Series of Poker: Tournament of Champions and is available for the Xbox 360, PlayStation 2, PlayStation 3, PlayStation Portable, Nintendo DS and Microsoft Windows. There are many well-recognized professional poker players in this game, such as Scotty Nguyen, Phil Hellmuth, Chris Ferguson, and Johnny Chan.

== Reception ==
Reception

Aggregate score
Aggregator	Score					
Aggregator	DS	PC	PS2	PS3	PSP	Xbox 360
Metacritic	55/100	79/100	84/100	75/100	N/A	74/100

Review scores
Publication	Score					
Publication	DS	PC	PS2	PS3	PSP	Xbox 360
IGN	5.5/10	7.9/10	7.9/10	7.9/10	7.6/10	7.9/10
Jeuxvideo.com	11/20	8/20	11/20	11/20	11/20	11/20
Official Xbox Magazine (UK)	N/A	N/A	N/A	N/A	N/A	7/10
Official Xbox Magazine (US)	N/A	N/A	N/A	N/A	N/A	8/10
TeamXbox	N/A	N/A	N/A	N/A	N/A	8.3/10

The PC, PlayStation 2 and PlayStation 3 versions received "generally favorable reviews", while the Nintendo DS and Xbox 360 versions received "mixed or average reviews", according to the review aggregation website Metacritic.
