= The Cameron Files: Secret at Loch Ness =

2001 video game

- Developer: Galiléa
- Publishers: EU: Wanadoo Edition; NA: DreamCatcher Interactive/The Adventure Company
- Platform: Windows
- Release: EU: November 16, 2001; NA: January 24, 2002
- Genre: Adventure
- Mode: Single-player

The Cameron Files: Secret at Loch Ness (known as Loch Ness in Europe) is an adventure video game for Windows released in 2001, developed by Galiléa and published by Wanadoo Edition and DreamCatcher Interactive. It was followed by the 2002 sequel The Cameron Files: Pharaoh's Curse.

== Story ==
The detective Alan Parker Cameron is investigating the secret case of the monster of Loch Ness; he is sent to "Devil's Ridge Manor" (a mansion located at the shore of the lake) because people claim to see ghosts and paranormal activity around the house. Alan is sent there to resolve the case.

== Gameplay ==
As the detective the players must explore this haunted house, full of labyrinths and traps. They will also have to visit the depths of the lake in order to complete the game.

== Reception ==
Reception

Aggregate score
Aggregator	Score
Metacritic	66/100

Review scores
Publication	Score
Adventure Gamers	3/5
GameZone	7/10

The game received "average" reviews according to video game review aggregator Metacritic.

== Sequel ==
A sequel, The Cameron Files: Pharaoh's Curse, followed in 2002. In 2013, the software developer Microids made a mobile version of "Secret at Loch Ness" for the iPhone, iPad, and iPod Touch, optimized for the iPhone 5. When asked if there would be a Pharaoh's Curse mobile version, there was no response from Microids.

== See also ==
- Necronomicon: The Dawning of Darkness
- The Mystery of the Druids
- Loch Ness Monster in popular culture
