= Cabela's Ultimate Deer Hunt =

2001 video game

- Developer: nFusion Interactive
- Publisher: Activision Value
- Platform: Windows
- Release: September 3, 2001
- Genre: Sports (Hunting)

Cabela's Ultimate Deer Hunt is the first to be released in the Ultimate Deer Hunt series. It was developed by nFusion Interactive and released September 3, 2001.

The game was published by Activision Value, in conjunction with hunting supply company Cabela's.
