= Elsinore Multimedia =

Video game developer in Hollywood, Florida

Elsinore Multimedia, Inc.
- Industry: Video games, computer software industry
- Founded: Hollywood, Florida
- Defunct: 1999
- Fate: Acquired
- Successor: Activision Value
- Headquarters: Hollywood, Florida, United States
- Area served: United States
- Products: Big Game Hunter series Essential Language series

Elsinore Multimedia, Inc. was a software and video game developer based in Hollywood, Florida. The company produced products including the Essential Language series and the Cabela's Big Game Hunter series. Elsinore was acquired by Activision, Inc. in 1999.

In 2001, Activision combined Elsinore Multimedia with Head Games Publishing and Expert Software to form Activision Value.
