= Cabela's Big Game Hunter (video game) =

1998 video game

- Cabela's Big Game Hunter cover art
- Developer: Elsinore Multimedia
- Publisher: HeadGames Publishing
- Platform: Windows
- Release: April 1998
- Genres: Sports, shooter

Cabela's Big Game Hunter is the first video game in the Big Game Hunter series. The game features diverse hunting scenarios, alongside a wide array of weapons, characters, animals, and locations.

The game was published by HeadGames Publishing, in conjunction with hunting supply company Cabela's.

== Reception ==
Computer Gaming World gave the game a score of one-and-a-half stars out of five, saying that it "suffers from a split personality: 50 percent of the game is decent; 50 percent of it is utter crap. [...] If Head Games could find a workable hunt engine to pair with the pre-hunt preparations, they'd improve the game all the way to mediocre. As it stands, it's not worth your money."

The game sold 250,000 copies.

== Expansion pack ==
Special Permit is an expansion pack created for the original game. It released in 1998, featuring new animals, 23 new stands, a new world, 9 new weapons, new camps, a new target range and an all-new video.
