= List of Climax games =

This is a list of games developed by Climax Studios (formerly Images Software and then The Climax Group).

== List of games ==
Title	Platform(s)	Year	Notes
Sky Shark	Amiga, Atari ST	1988	Scrolling shooter
R-Type	Atari ST	1988	Scrolling shooter
Wonder Boy in Monster Land	Amiga, Amstrad CPC, Atari ST, Commodore 64, ZX Spectrum	1989	Platform
Back to the Future Part II	Amiga, Amstrad CPC, Atari ST, Commodore 64, MS-DOS, Master System, ZX Spectrum	1990	Action
Ninja Spirit	Amiga, Atari ST	1990	Platform
Chip's Challenge	Amiga, Amstrad CPC, Atari ST, Commodore 64, ZX Spectrum	1990	Puzzle
The Hunt for Red October	MS-DOS	1990	Action
Shadow Dancer	Amiga, Amstrad CPC, Atari ST, Commodore 64, ZX Spectrum	1991	Platform
Beast Busters	Amiga, Atari ST	1991	Shooter
Last Battle	Commodore 64	1991	Beat 'em up
Spot	Atari ST	1991	Puzzle
G-LOC: Air Battle	Amiga, Amstrad CPC, Atari ST, Commodore 64, ZX Spectrum	1992	Shooter
Moonstone: A Hard Days Knight	MS-DOS	1992	Action RPG
Space Gun	Amiga, Amstrad CPC, Atari ST, Commodore 64, ZX Spectrum	1992	Shooter
Arcade Smash Hits	Master System	1992	Action
Bubsy II	Game Boy	1994	Platform
Nick Faldo's Championship Golf	Amiga CD32	1994	Golf
Chicago Syndicate	Game Gear	1995	Platform
UFO: Enemy Unknown	Amiga	1995	Real-time strategy
Road Riot 4WD	Atari ST	1996	Racing
Bugs Bunny in Double Trouble	Genesis, Game Gear	1996	Platform
WarCraft II: The Dark Saga	Saturn, PlayStation	1997	Real-time strategy
FIFA Road to World Cup 98	Saturn	1997	Soccer sim
Diablo	PlayStation	1998	Hack 'n' slash
San Francisco Rush: Extreme Racing	PlayStation	1998	Racing
NHL Blades of Steel	Game Boy Color	1999	Hockey
Theme Park World	PlayStation	1999	Published by EA Games
Battlezone: Rise of the Black Dogs	Nintendo 64	2000	Real-time strategy
ATV Quad Power Racing	PlayStation	2000	Rally / Offroad racing
Power Rangers Lightspeed Rescue	PlayStation	2000	Action
NHL Blades of Steel 2000	Game Boy Color	2000	Hockey
Lego Alpha Team	Game Boy Color	2000	Action
Warriors of Might and Magic	Game Boy Color	2000	Action
Lego Racers	Game Boy Color	2000	Racing
AirForce Delta	Game Boy Color	2000	Flight simulator
Magic & Mayhem: The Art of Magic	Windows	2001	Strategy
SpongeBob SquarePants: SuperSponge	PlayStation, Game Boy Advance	2001	Platform
Power Rangers Time Force	PlayStation	2001	Action
Robot Wars: Arenas of Destruction	Windows, PlayStation 2	2001	Mech sim
MotoGP	Xbox	2002	Racer
Rally Fusion: Race of Champions	PlayStation 2, Xbox	2002	Rally
Robot Wars: Extreme Destruction	Windows, Xbox	2002	Mech sim
Gumball 3000	PlayStation 2	2002	Racing
ATV Quad Power Racing 2	GameCube, Xbox	2003	Rally
MotoGP 2	Windows, Xbox	2003	Racing
Speed Kings	GameCube, PlayStation 2, Xbox	2003	Racing
The Italian Job	GameCube, PlayStation 2, Xbox	2003	Mission-based driving
Hot Wheels World Race	GameCube, PlayStation 2	2003	Racer
Serious Sam: Next Encounter	GameCube, PlayStation 2	2004	Climax Group's first first-person shooter
Serious Sam Advance	Game Boy Advance	2004	The Game Boy Advance Serious Sam game was released the same day as its GameCube and PlayStation 2 counterpart.
Sudeki	Xbox, Windows	2004	The Xbox version was released in 2004; the Windows version in 2005.
Disney's Lilo & Stitch 2: Hämsterviel Havoc	Game Boy Advance	2004	Platform
ATV Offroad Fury 3	PlayStation 2	2004	Offroad racing
Tron 2.0: Killer App	Xbox	2004	First-person shooter
Hot Wheels: Stunt Track Challenge	Game Boy Advance, PlayStation 2, Windows, Xbox	2004	Futuristic racing
Crash 'N' Burn	PlayStation 2, Xbox	2004	Racing
Volvo: Drive for Life	Xbox	2005	Simulation
ATV Offroad Fury: Blazin' Trails	PlayStation Portable	2005	First PlayStation Portable game developed by Climax
Delta Force: Black Hawk Down	Xbox	2005	Shooter
Lizzie McGuire 3: Homecoming Havoc	Game Boy Advance	2005	Platform
MotoGP 3	Windows, Xbox	2005	Racing
Nicktoons Unite!	Game Boy Advance, Nintendo DS	2005	Fantasied action-adventure / First Nintendo DS title by the Climax Group
The Wild	Game Boy Advance	2006	Platform
MotoGP '06	Xbox 360	2006	First 7th-generation home console game by Climax
Crusty Demons	Xbox, PlayStation 2	2006	Although the title appeared on both the Xbox and PlayStation 2, the PlayStation 2 edition was not released simultaneously with the Xbox edition.
W.I.T.C.H.	Game Boy Advance	2006	Platform
ATV Offroad Fury Pro	PlayStation Portable	2006	Racing
ATV Offroad Fury 4	PlayStation 2	2006	Racing
Ghost Rider	PlayStation 2, PlayStation Portable	2007	Action
Meet the Robinsons	Game Boy Advance	2007	Action
Viva Piñata	Windows	2007	Port of the Xbox 360 title of the same name by Rare.
Silent Hill: Origins	PlayStation Portable, PlayStation 2	2007	Horror action-adventure, and the first Silent Hill title produced outside Konami
Overlord: Dark Legend	Wii	2009	Overlord: Dark Legend is an exclusive Wii game in the Overlord series. The game was a runner-up for IGN's Best of E3 2009 Wii Awards.
Overlord: Minions	Nintendo DS	2009	Overlord: Minions is the Nintendo DS exclusive to the Overlord series. The Xbox 360, PC and PS3 versions of Overlord are not developed by Climax.
Silent Hill: Shattered Memories	Wii, PlayStation Portable, PlayStation 2	2009	The lead platform is the Wii, while the PSP and PS2 versions are ports. Winner of IGN's Best Wii Game of E3 2009 Awards.
Rocket Knight	PlayStation Network, Xbox Live Arcade, Steam	2010	Platform shooter
Gormiti: The Lords of Nature!	Wii, Nintendo DS	2010	Platform
EyePet & Friends	PlayStation 3	2011	Pet simulation
Bloodforge	Xbox Live Arcade	2012	Action/Hack 'n' slash
Smart As	PlayStation Vita	2012	Puzzle
Castlevania: Lords of Shadow	Windows	2013	Port of the PS3 and Xbox 360 title of the same name by Mercury Steam
Dead Nation: Apocalypse	PlayStation 4	2014	Port of the PS3 title of Dead Nation by Housemarque
Dead Nation	PlayStation Vita	2014	Port of the PS3 title of Dead Nation by Housemarque
Resogun	PlayStation Vita, PlayStation 3	2014	Port of the PS4 title of the title of the same name by Housemarque
Assassin's Creed Chronicles	PlayStation 4, Xbox One, Windows	2015	Platform
Adventure Time: Pirates of the Enchiridion	Windows, Nintendo Switch, PlayStation 4, Xbox One	2018	Action-adventure
Crayola Scoot	Windows, Nintendo Switch, PlayStation 4, Xbox One	2018	Sports
Dragons: Dawn of New Riders	Windows, Nintendo Switch, PlayStation 4, Xbox One	2019	Action-adventure
Returnal	PlayStation 5, Windows	2021	Assisted development for Housemarque
Days Gone Remastered	PlayStation 5	2025	Remastered PS5 port for Bend Studio
