= List of PlayStation 2 online games =

This is a list of games that supported the online functionality of the Sony PlayStation 2 video game console. As of 2025, many games are currently playable online due to servers run and operated by fans such as PS2Online and the SOCOM Community server.

== Released Games ==
Game title	Genre	Publisher	Shutdown Date	Server Alternatives	Notes
.hack//fragment	Online RPG	Bandai	January 18, 2007	PS2Online, Net Slum Server	
007: Everything or Nothing	Third-person shooter	Electronic Arts	January 13, 2006		
187 Ride or Die	Vehicular combat	Ubisoft	November 13, 2006		
2006 FIFA World Cup	Sports	EA Sports			
25 to Life	Third-person shooter	Eidos Interactive	January 26, 2009	PS2Online	
AFL Premiership 2005	Sports	Sony Computer Entertainment Europe		PS2Online	
All-Star Baseball 2005	Sports	Acclaim Entertainment	March 31, 2016	PS2Online	
Amplitude	Rhythm	Sony Computer Entertainment	February 26, 2007 (NTSC); June 30, 2008 (PAL)	PS2Online, SOCOM Community	PAL version requires a patch to connect
AND 1 Streetball	Sports	Ubisoft	March 31, 2016		
Arc the Lad: End of Darkness	Action Role-playing	Namco	June 15, 2006	PS2Online, SOCOM Community	
Area 51	First-person shooter	Midway Games	December 2012	PS2Online	Requires an existing Online save file to connect
Arena Football	Sports	Electronic Arts	September 1, 2007		
Arena Football: Road to Glory	Sports	Electronic Arts	July 1, 2008		
ATV Offroad Fury 2	Racing	Sony Computer Entertainment	August 1, 2007	PS2Online, SOCOM Community	
ATV Offroad Fury 3	Racing	Sony Computer Entertainment	August 1, 2007		
ATV Offroad Fury 4	Racing	Sony Computer Entertainment			
Auto Modellista	Racing	Capcom	April 2, 2007		
Auto Modellista US Tuned	Racing	Capcom		MH Oldschool	DNAS Patch is required to connect
Battlefield 2: Modern Combat	First-person shooter	Electronic Arts	June 30, 2014	PS2Online	PAL version requires a patch to connect
Blitz: The League	Sports	Midway Games		PS2Online	
Brothers in Arms: Earned in Blood	First-person shooter	Ubisoft			
Brothers in Arms: Road to Hill 30	First-person shooter	Ubisoft			
Burnout 3: Takedown	Racing	EA Games	April 13, 2010		
Burnout Revenge	Racing	Electronic Arts	April 13, 2012		
Call of Duty 2: Big Red One	First-person shooter	Activision	March 31, 2016	PS2Online, OpenSpy	
Call of Duty: Finest Hour	First-person shooter	Activision	March 31, 2016	PS2Online, OpenSpy	
Call of Duty 3	First-person shooter	Activision	Still Online	PS2Online	
Champions of Norrath: Realms of EverQuest	Action role-playing	Sony Online Entertainment	April 2, 2013		
Champions: Return to Arms	Action role-playing	Sony Online Entertainment	April 2, 2013		
Chessmaster	Chess	Ubisoft			
Code Breaker	Application	Pelican Accessories	Late 2010		
Cold Winter	First-person shooter	Vivendi Universal Games		PS2Online	
Colin McRae Rally 2005	Racing	Codemasters	March 31, 2016	PS2Online	
College Hoops 2K6	Sports	2K			
College Hoops 2K7	Sports	2K			
College Hoops 2K8	Sports	2K	March 31, 2016		
Commandos: Strike Force	Tactical shooter	Eidos Interactive	2009		
Conflict: Global Terror	Tactical shooter	SCi Games, 2K		PS2Online	
Crash 'n' Burn	Racing	Eidos Interactive	March 31, 2016	PS2Online	
Dance Dance Revolution Extreme 2	Rhythm	Konami	September 12, 2006		
Dance Dance Revolution SuperNova	Rhythm	Konami	September 10, 2007		
Dance Dance Revolution SuperNova 2	Rhythm	Konami			
Dance Dance Revolution X	Rhythm	Konami			
Deer Hunter	First-person shooter	Atari	March 31, 2016	PS2Online	
Delta Force: Black Hawk Down	First-person shooter	NovaLogic	March 31, 2016	PS2Online	
Delta Force: Black Hawk Down - Team Sabre	First-person shooter	NovaLogic	March 31, 2016	PS2Online	
Destruction Derby Arenas	Racing	Gathering	June 30, 2008	PS2Online, SOCOM Community	
Dirge of Cerberus: Final Fantasy VII	Third-person shooter	Square Enix	March 31, 2016		Unable to be installed after server shutdown due to Sony DNAS encryption.
ESPN College Hoops	Sports	Sega			
ESPN College Hoops 2K5	Sports	Sega			
ESPN Major League Baseball	Sports	Sega			
ESPN NBA Basketball	Sports	Sega			
ESPN NFL 2K5	Sports	Sega			
ESPN NFL Football	Sports	Sega			
ESPN NHL 2K5	Sports	Sega			
ESPN NHL Hockey	Sports	Sega			
EverQuest Online Adventures	Online RPG	Sony Online Entertainment	March 29, 2012	PS2Online, Sandstorm	
EverQuest Online Adventures: Frontiers	Online RPG	Sony Online Entertainment	March 29, 2012	PS2Online, Sandstorm	
EyeToy: Chat	Application	Sony Computer Entertainment	June 30, 2008		
F1 04	Racing	Sony Computer Entertainment			
F1 05	Racing	Sony Computer Entertainment	March 31, 2016	PS2Online, SOCOM Community	
Family Feud	Trivia	Global Star Software			
FIFA 06	Sports	Electronic Arts	September 1, 2007		
FIFA 07	Sports	Electronic Arts	February 2, 2010		
FIFA 08	Sports	Electronic Arts	February 8, 2011		
FIFA 09	Sports	Electronic Arts	February 8, 2011		
FIFA Soccer 2004	Sports	Electronic Arts	June 15, 2005		
FIFA Soccer 2005	Sports	Electronic Arts	August 1, 2007		
Fight Club	Fighting	Vivendi Universal Games		PS2Online	
Fight Night Round 2	Fighting	EA Sports	August 1, 2006		
Fight Night Round 3	Fighting	EA Sports	February 2, 2010		
Final Fantasy XI; Final Fantasy XI: Chains of Promathia; Final Fantasy XI: Treasures of Aht Urhgan; Final Fantasy XI: Wings of the Goddess; Final Fantasy XI: Seekers of Adoulin; JongHoLo; Tetra Master	Online RPG	Square Enix	March 31, 2016		Unable to be installed after server shutdown due to Sony DNAS encryption.
FlatOut	Racing	Empire Interactive	March 31, 2016	PS2Online	
FlatOut 2	Racing	Vivendi Universal Games	March 31, 2016	PS2Online, OpenSpy	
Ford vs. Chevy	Racing	2K Games	March 31, 2016	PS2Online	
Frankie Dettori Racing	Racing	Tru Blue Entertainment	March 31, 2016		
Frequency	Rhythm	SCEA	May 9, 2005	PS2Online, SOCOM Community	
Front Mission: Online	Third-person Shooter	Square Enix	May 31, 2008		Unable to be installed after server shutdown due to Sony DNAS encryption.
Full Spectrum Warrior	Tactics	THQ	March 31, 2016	PS2Online	
Full Spectrum Warrior: Ten Hammers	Tactics	THQ	June 30, 2014	PS2Online	
Gauntlet: Seven Sorrows	Hack and slash	Midway Games	March 31, 2016	PS2Online	
Godzilla: Save the Earth	Fighting	Atari	March 31, 2016	PS2Online	
GoldenEye: Rogue Agent	First-person shooter	Electronic Arts	October 1, 2006		
Gran Turismo 4 Online test version	Racing	Sony Computer Entertainment		PS2Online, SOCOM Community	
Greg Hastings Tournament Paintball MAX'D	First-person shooter	Activision		PS2Online	
Gretzky NHL 2005	Sports	Sony Computer Entertainment			
Gretzky NHL 2006	Sports	Sony Computer Entertainment			
Hardware: Online Arena	Vehicular Combat	Sony Computer Entertainment		PS2Online, SOCOM Community	
Heroes of the Pacific	Air combat simulation	Ubisoft		PS2Online	
Hot Shots Golf Fore!	Sports	Sony Computer Entertainment	June 30, 2008	PS2Online, SOCOM Community	
Hot Wheels: Stunt Track Challenge	Racing	THQ	March 31, 2016	PS2Online	
IndyCar Series 2005	Racing	Codemasters	March 31, 2016	PS2Online	
Jak X: Combat Racing	Vehicular Combat	Sony Computer Entertainment	May 9, 2008	PS2Online	
Juiced	Racing	THQ	March 31, 2016	PS2Online	
Juiced 2: Hot Import Nights	Racing	THQ			
Killzone	First-person shooter	Sony Computer Entertainment	February 14, 2012	PS2Online, SOCOM Community	
KOF: Maximum Impact 2	Fighting	SNK Playmore	March 31, 2016		
KOF: Maximum Impact: Regulation A	Fighting	SNK Playmore	March 31, 2016		
Lemmings	Puzzle	Sony Computer Entertainment			
LMA Manager 2005	Sports	Codemasters			
LMA Manager 2006	Sports	Codemasters			
LMA Manager 2007	Sports	Codemasters			
Madden NFL 06	Sports	Electronic Arts	September 1, 2007		
Madden NFL 07	Sports	Electronic Arts	April 1, 2009		
Madden NFL 08	Sports	Electronic Arts	February 9, 2010		
Madden NFL 09	Sports	Electronic Arts	February 9, 2010		
Madden NFL 10	Sports	Electronic Arts	October 1, 2011		
Madden NFL 2003	Sports	Electronic Arts	August 31, 2003		
Madden NFL 2004	Sports	Electronic Arts	October 5, 2005		
Madden NFL 2005	Sports	Electronic Arts	October 1, 2006		
Major League Baseball 2K5	Sports	2K			
Major League Baseball 2K6	Sports	2K			
Major League Baseball 2K7	Sports	2K			
Major League Baseball 2K8	Sports	2K	March 31, 2016		
Major League Baseball 2K9	Sports	2K	March 31, 2016		
Major League Baseball 2K10	Sports	2K	March 31, 2016		
Major League Baseball 2K11	Sports	2K	March 31, 2016		
Major League Baseball 2K12	Sports	2K	March 31, 2016		
Manchester United Manager 2005	Sports	Codemasters			
Marvel Nemesis: Rise of the Imperfects	Fighting	Electronic Arts	September 1, 2007		
Marvel: Ultimate Alliance	Action role-playing	Activision	March 31, 2016	PS2Online	
Medal of Honor: Rising Sun	First-person shooter	Electronic Arts	January 27, 2007	PS2Online	
Metal Gear Solid 3: Subsistence	Stealth	Konami	JP: December 26, 2006; NA:April 2, 2007; PAL:October 30, 2007	SaveMGO	
Midnight Club 3: DUB Edition Remix	Racing	Rockstar Games	March 31, 2016	PS2Online, OpenSpy	
Midnight Club II	Racing	Rockstar Games	March 31, 2016	PS2Online, OpenSpy, Gameshare	
MLB 06: The Show	Sports	Sony Computer Entertainment			
MLB 07: The Show	Sports	Sony Computer Entertainment			
MLB 08: The Show	Sports	Sony Computer Entertainment			
MLB 09: The Show	Sports	Sony Computer Entertainment			
MLB 2005	Sports	SCEA			
MLB 2006	Sports	SCEA			
MLB Slugfest Loaded	Sports	Midway Games	March 31, 2016	PS2Online	
Monster Hunter	Action RPG	Capcom	WW: December 31, 2007; JPN: July 1, 2011	MH Oldschool	
Monster Hunter 2	Action RPG	Capcom		MH Oldschool	
Monster Hunter G	Action RPG	Capcom		MH Oldschool	
Mortal Kombat: Armageddon	Fighting	Midway Games	March 31, 2016	PS2Online, OpenSpy	
Mortal Kombat: Deception	Fighting	Midway Games	March 31, 2016	PS2Online, OpenSpy	
MotoGP 4	Racing	Namco	March 31, 2016	PS2Online	
MTX Mototrax	Racing	Activision	March 31, 2016	PS2Online	
MVP Baseball 2004	Sports	EA Sports	January 13, 2006		
MVP Baseball 2005	Sports	EA Sports	March 28, 2006		
MVP 06: NCAA Baseball	Sports	EA Sports	September 01, 2007		
MVP 07: NCAA Baseball	Sports	EA Sports	July 1, 2008		
MX vs. ATV Unleashed	Racing	THQ	March 31, 2016	PS2Online	
MX vs. ATV Untamed	Racing	THQ	March 31, 2016	PS2Online	
My Street	Party	SCEA		PS2Online	
NASCAR 06: Total Team Control	Racing	EA Sports	September 1, 2007		
NASCAR 07	Racing	EA Sports	July 1, 2008		
NASCAR 08	Racing	EA Sports	February 2, 2010		
NASCAR 09	Racing	EA Sports	February 2, 2010		
NASCAR 2005: Chase for the Cup	Racing	EA Sports	October 1, 2006		
NASCAR Thunder 2004	Racing	EA Sports	June 15, 2005		
NBA 06	Sports	Sony Computer Entertainment			
NBA 07	Sports	Sony Computer Entertainment			
NBA 08	Sports	Sony Computer Entertainment			
NBA 2K8	Sports	2K	March 31, 2016		
NBA 2K9	Sports	2K	March 31, 2016		
NBA 2K10	Sports	2K	March 31, 2016		
NBA 2K11	Sports	2K	March 31, 2016		
NBA 2K12	Sports	2K	March 31, 2016		
NBA Ballers	Sports	Midway	March 31, 2016	PS2Online	
NBA Ballers: Phenom	Sports	Midway	March 31, 2016	PS2Online	
NBA Live 2003	Sports	EA Sports	June 2, 2004		
NBA Live 2004	Sports	EA Sports	June 15, 2005		
NBA Live 2005	Sports	EA Sports	August 1, 2006		
NBA Live 06	Sports	EA Sports	September 1, 2007		
NBA Live 07	Sports	EA Sports	July 1, 2008		
NBA Live 08	Sports	EA Sports	February 2, 2011		
NBA ShootOut 2004	Sports	SCEA	May 9, 2005		
NBA Street Vol. 2	Sports	Electronic Arts			
NBA Street V3	Sports	Electronic Arts	August 1, 2006		
NCAA College Basketball 2K3	Sports	Sega			
NCAA Final Four 2004	Sports	SCEA	May 9, 2005		
NCAA Football 2004	Sports	SCEA	June 15, 2005		
NCAA Football 2005	Sports	SCEA	August 1, 2006		
NCAA Football 06	Sports	EA Sports	September 1, 2007		
NCAA Football 07	Sports	EA Sports	July 1, 2008		
NCAA Football 08	Sports	EA Sports	February 2, 2010		
NCAA Football 09	Sports	EA Sports	February 2, 2010		
NCAA Football 10	Sports	EA Sports			
NCAA Football 11	Sports	EA Sports			
NCAA GameBreaker 2004	Sports	SCEA	May 9, 2005		
NCAA March Madness 2004	Sports	EA Sports	June 15, 2005		
NCAA March Madness 2005	Sports	EA Sports	August 1, 2006		
NCAA March Madness 06	Sports	EA Sports	July 1, 2008		
NCAA March Madness 07	Sports	EA Sports			
NCAA March Madness 08	Sports	EA Sports			
Need for Speed: Most Wanted	Racing	Electronic Arts			
Need for Speed: Underground	Racing	Electronic Arts	December 4, 2007		
Need for Speed: Underground 2	Racing	Electronic Arts	December 4, 2007		
NFL 2K3	Sports	Sega			
NFL GameDay 2003	Sports	SCEA			
NFL GameDay 2004	Sports	SCEA	May 09, 2005		
NFL Head Coach	Sports	EA Sports	September 1, 2007		
NFL Blitz Pro	Sports	Midway Games		PS2Online	
NFL Street	Sports	Electronic Arts	January 13, 2006		
NFL Street 2	Sports	Electronic Arts	October 1, 2006		
NFL Street 3	Sports	Electronic Arts	July 1, 2008		
NHL 2004	Sports	EA Sports	June 15, 2005		
NHL 2005	Sports	EA Sports	August 1, 2006		
NHL 06	Sports	EA Sports	September 1, 2007		
NHL 07	Sports	EA Sports	July 1, 2008		
NHL 08	Sports	EA Sports			
NHL 09	Sports	EA Sports			
NHL Hitz Pro	Sports	Midway Games		PS2Online	
NHL 2K6	Sports	2K	March 31, 2016		
NHL 2K7	Sports	2K	March 31, 2016		
Outlaw Golf 2	Sports	Simon & Schuster Interactive	March 31, 2016	PS2Online	
Outlaw Tennis	Sports	Global Star Software	March 31, 2016	PS2Online	
Outlaw Volleyball Remixed	Sports	Simon & Schuster Interactive	March 31, 2016		
OutRun 2006: Coast 2 Coast	Racing	Sega	May 13, 2009		
Phantasy Star Universe	Online RPG	Sega	PAL & NTSC: March 31, 2010; JPN: April 14th 2011	Sega	
Phantasy Star Universe: Ambition of the Illuminus	Online RPG	Sega	PAL & NTSC: March 31, 2010; JPN: April 14th 2011		
Pro Evolution Soccer 5	Sports	Konami		PS2Online	
Pro Evolution Soccer 6	Sports	Konami		PS2Online	
Pro Evolution Soccer 2008	Sports	Konami			
Pro Evolution Soccer 2010	Sports	Konami			
Pro Evolution Soccer 2012	Sports	Konami	January 28, 2013		
Project: Snowblind	First-person shooter	Eidos Interactive	February 27, 2008		
Pool Shark 2	Sports	Zoo Digital Publishing	March 31, 2016	PS2Online	
Ratchet: Deadlocked	Platormer	Sony Computer Entertainment	June 28, 2012	PS2Online	
Resident Evil Outbreak	Horror	Capcom	NTSC: December 31, 2007; JP: June 30, 2011	PS2Online, Outbreak Server Resurrection	Called Biohazard Outbreak in Japan Only the NTSC-J versions has been restored for online play. English versions are currently not supported and are still shut down.
Resident Evil Outbreak: File 2	Horror	Capcom	March 31, 2007	PS2Online, Outbreak Server Resurrection	Called Biohazard Outbreak: File 2 in Japan Only the NTSC-J versions has been restored for online play. English versions are currently not supported and are still shut down.
Risk: Global Domination	Board Game	Atari Interactive	March 31, 2016	PS2Online	
Robotech: Invasion	First-person shooter	Global Star Software	March 31, 2016	PS2Online	
Rogue Trooper	Third-person shooter	Eidos Interactive	March 31, 2016	PS2Online	
Rugby League 2	Sports	Tru Blu Entertainment	March 31, 2016		
Ratchet & Clank: Up Your Arsenal	Platformer	Sony Computer Entertainment	June 28, 2012	PS2Online, SOCOM Community	
S.L.A.I.: Steel Lancer Arena International	Vehicular combat	Konami	October 1, 2006		
SnoCross 2	Sports	Crave Entertainment			
Spy vs. Spy	Platformer	Global Star Software		PS2Online	
SSX 3	Sports	Electronic Arts	January 13, 2006		
Star Wars: Battlefront	Third-person shooter	LucasArts	June 30, 2014	PS2Online, SWBFSpy	
Star Wars: Battlefront II	Third-person shooter	LucasArts	June 30, 2014	PS2Online, SWBFSpy	
Street Racing Syndicate	Racing	Namco		PS2Online	
Syphon Filter: The Omega Strain	Third-person shooter	Sony Computer Entertainment	May 9, 2008	PS2Online, SOCOM Community	
Sniper Elite	Tactical shooter	Namco Hometek	March 31, 2016	PS2Online	
Serious Sam: Next Encounter	First-person shooter	Global Star Software	March 31, 2016	PS2Online	
SOCOM U.S. Navy SEALs	Tactical shooter	Sony Computer Entertainment	August 31, 2012	PS2Online, SOCOM Community	
SOCOM II U.S. Navy SEALs	Tactical shooter	Sony Computer Entertainment	August 31, 2012	PS2Online, SOCOM Community	
SOCOM 3 U.S. Navy SEALs	Tactical shooter	Sony Computer Entertainment	August 31, 2012	PS2Online, SOCOM Community	
SOCOM U.S. Navy SEALs: Combined Assault	Tactical shooter	Sony Computer Entertainment	August 31, 2012	PS2Online	
Test Drive Unlimited	Racing	Atari	Summer 2009		
TimeSplitters: Future Perfect	First-person Shooter	Electronic Arts	July 6, 2007		
The Bigs	Sports	2K	March 31, 2016		
The Fast and the Furious	Racing	Namco Bandai Games		PS2Online	
The Hustle: Detroit Streets	Billiards	Activision	March 31, 2016	PS2Online	
The King of Fighters: Maximum Impact	Fighting	SNK Playmore	March 31, 2016		
The Sims Bustin' Out	Simulation	Electronic Arts	August 15, 2005	PS2Online, FreeSO	
Tiger Woods PGA Tour 2004	Sports	Electronic Arts	June 15, 2005		
Tiger Woods PGA Tour 2005	Sports	Electronic Arts	November 1, 2007		
Tiger Woods PGA Tour 06	Sports	Electronic Arts	July 1, 2008		
Tiger Woods PGA Tour 07	Sports	Electronic Arts	July 1, 2008		
Tiger Woods PGA Tour 08	Sports	Electronic Arts	April 1, 2009		
TOCA Race Driver 2	Racing	Codemasters	March 31, 2016	PS2Online	
TOCA Race Driver 3	Racing	Codemasters	March 31, 2016	PS2Online	
Tom Clancy's Ghost Recon: Jungle Storm	Tactical Shooter	Ubisoft			
Tom Clancy's Ghost Recon 2	Tactical Shooter	Ubisoft			
Tom Clancy's Rainbow Six 3: Raven Shield	Tactical Shooter	Ubisoft			
Tom Clancy's Rainbow Six: Lockdown	Tactical Shooter	Ubisoft			
Tom Clancy's Splinter Cell: Chaos Theory	Stealth	Ubisoft			
Tom Clancy's Splinter Cell: Double Agent	Stealth	Ubisoft			
Tom Clancy's Splinter Cell: Pandora Tomorrow	Stealth	Ubisoft			
Tony Hawk's Pro Skater 3	Sports	Activision	2005	PS2Online	
Tony Hawk's Pro Skater 4	Sports	Activision	January 1, 2006	PS2Online	
Tony Hawk's Underground	Sports	Activision	July 26, 2007	PS2Online	
Tony Hawk's Underground 2	Sports	Activision	July 26, 2007	PS2Online	
Tony Hawk's American Wasteland	Sports	Activision	July 26, 2007	PS2Online	
Top Spin	Sports	2K	March 31, 2016	PS2Online	
Tribes: Aerial Assault	First-person shooter	Sierra Entertainment	March 31, 2016		
Trivial Pursuit: Unhinged	Trivia	Atari Interactive	March 31, 2016	PS2Online	
Twisted Metal: Black Online	Vehicular combat	SCEA	April 10, 2006	PS2Online, TMBOSVR	
UEFA Champions League 2004–2005	Sports	Electronic Arts			
UEFA Champions League 2006–2007	Sports	Electronic Arts	July 1, 2008		
Urban Chaos: Riot Response	First-person shooter	Eidos Interactive		PS2Online	
Warhammer 40,000: Fire Warrior	First-person shooter	THQ	March 31, 2016	PS2Online	
World Championship Cards	Gambling	Crave Entertainment			
World Poker Tour	Gambling	2K			
WRC 4	Racing	SCEE		PS2Online, SOCOM Community	
WRC: Rally Evolved	Racing	Sony Computer Entertainment		PS2Online, SOCOM Community	
WWE SmackDown vs. Raw 2007	Sports	THQ	February 7, 2009		
World Championship Paintball	Sports	THQ	March 31, 2016		
World Championship Poker	Gambling	Crave Entertainment	March 31, 2016	PS2Online	
World Championship Poker 2	Gambling	Crave Entertainment	March 31, 2016		
World Championship Poker: All In	Gambling	Crave Entertainment	March 31, 2016		
World Championship Pool 2004	Sports	Jaleco	March 31, 2016	PS2Online	
World Championship Snooker 2004	Sports	Codemasters	March 31, 2016	PS2Online	
World Series of Poker	Gambling	Activision	March 31, 2016	PS2Online	
World Series of Poker: Tournament of Champions	Gambling	Activision	March 31, 2016		
World Series of Poker 2008: Battle for the Bracelets	Gambling	Activision	March 31, 2016		
World Snooker Championship 2005	Sports	Sega	March 31, 2016		
WWE SmackDown! vs. Raw	Sports	THQ	March 31, 2016	PS2Online	
WWE SmackDown! vs. Raw 2006	Sports	THQ	March 31, 2016	PS2Online	Untested
X-Men Legends II: Rise of Apocalypse	Action role-playing	Activision	March 31, 2016	PS2Online	
XIII	First-person shooter	Ubisoft			

== LAN Games ==
PlayStation 2 LAN titles can be played online using the XLink Kai service. Some games only had LAN play available in specific regions.

Game title	Genre	Publisher	Region
25 To Life	Third-person shooter	Eidos Interactive	North America
Armored Core: Nexus	Third-person shooter	Agetec	North America
Armored Core: Nine Breaker	Third-person shooter	Agetec	North America
Armored Core: Last Raven	Third-person shooter	Agetec	North America
ATV Offroad Fury 2	Racing	Sony Computer Entertainment	North America
ATV Offroad Fury 3	Racing	Sony Computer Entertainment	North America
ATV Offroad Fury 4	Racing	Sony Computer Entertainment	North America
Call of Duty 2: Big Red One	First-person shooter	Activision	
Colin McRae Rally 2005	Racing	Codemasters	PAL Region
Conflict: Global Terror	Tactical shooter	2K Games	
Crash Tag Team Racing	Racing	Vivendi Universal Games	
Dance Dance Revolution X	Rhythm	Konami	
Fight Club	Fighting	Vivendi Universal Games	
Ford vs. Chevy	Racing	2K Games	
Full Spectrum Warrior: Ten Hammers	Tactics	THQ	
Godzilla: Save the Earth	Fighting	Atari	North America
Gran Turismo 4	Racing	Sony Computer Entertainment	
Greg Hastings Tournament Paintball MAX'D	Sports	Activision	North America
Heroes of the Pacific	Air combat	Ubisoft	
Hot Wheels: Stunt Track Challenge	Racing	THQ	
IndyCar Series 2005	Racing	Codemasters	
Jak X: Combat Racing	Racing	Sony Computer Entertainment	
Juiced	Racing	THQ	
Midnight Club II	Racing	Rockstar Games	
Midnight Club 3: DUB Edition Remix	Racing	Rockstar Games	
MotoGP 4	Racing	Namco	PAL Region
MTX: Mototrax	Racing	Activision	
NASCAR Thunder 2004	Racing	EA Sports	
OutRun 2006: Coast 2 Coast	Racing	Sega AM2	
Project: Snowblind	First-person shooter	Eidos Interactive	
Robotech: Invasion	First-person shooter	Global Star Software	
Rogue Trooper	Third-person shooter	Eidos Interactive	
SOCOM II U.S. Navy SEALs	Tactical shooter	Sony Computer Entertainment	
SOCOM 3 U.S. Navy SEALs	Tactical shooter	Sony Computer Entertainment	
SOCOM U.S. Navy SEALs: Combined Assault	Tactical shooter	Sony Computer Entertainment	
Spy vs. Spy	Platform	Global Star Software	
Star Wars: Battlefront	Third-person shooter	LucasArts	
Star Wars: Battlefront II	Third-person shooter	LucasArts	
Street Racing Syndicate	Racing	Namco	
TimeSplitters 2	First-person shooter	Eidos Interactive	
TimeSplitters: Future Perfect	First-person shooter	Electronic Arts	
TOCA Race Driver 2	Racing	Codemasters	
TOCA Race Driver 3	Racing	Codemasters	
Tom Clancy's Rainbow Six: Lockdown	Stealth	Ubisoft	
Tom Clancy's Splinter Cell: Pandora Tomorrow	Stealth	Ubisoft	
Tom Clancy's Splinter Cell: Chaos Theory	Stealth	Ubisoft	
Tom Clancy's Splinter Cell: Double Agent	Stealth	Ubisoft	
Tony Hawk's American Wasteland	Sports	Activision	
Tony Hawk's Pro Skater 3	Sports	Activision	North America
Tony Hawk's Pro Skater 4	Sports	Activision	
Tony Hawk's Underground	Sports	Activision	
Tony Hawk's Underground 2	Sports	Activision	
Tribes: Aerial Assault	First-person shooter	Sierra Entertainment	
Twisted Metal: Black Online	Vehicular combat	Sony Computer Entertainment	
Urban Chaos: Riot Response	First-person shooter	Eidos Interactive	
Sega Ages 2500 Series Vol. 31: Cyber Troopers Virtual-On	Action	Sega	Japan
Warhammer 40,000: Fire Warrior	First-person shooter	THQ	

== i.Link Games ==
- Age of Empires II: The Age of Kings (PAL regions)
- Armored Core 2 (PAL and Japan regions; NTSC-U / North America)
- Armored Core 2: Another Age (Japan; NTSC-U / North America)
- Armored Core 3
- Armored Core: Last Raven (North America and Japan regions)
- Armored Core: Nexus (North America and Japan regions)
- Armored Core: Nine Breaker (North America and Japan regions)
- ATV Offroad Fury 2 (North America only)
- Battle Gear 2 (Japan only, same game as Tokyo Road Race)
- Gran Turismo 3: A-Spec
- Gran Turismo Concept 2002 Tokyo-Geneva
- Kikou Heidan J-Phoenix
- Kikou Heidan J-Phoenix - Burst Tactics
- Lethal Skies II (PAL and NTSC-U/C, same game as Sidewinder V)
- Sidewinder V (Japan only, same game as Lethal Skies II)
- Silent Line: Armored Core
- Silent Scope 2
- TimeSplitters 2
- Time Crisis II
- Time Crisis 3
- Tokyo Road Race (PAL regions, same game as Battle Gear 2)
- Unreal Tournament (North America only)
- Wangan Midnight (Japan only)
