= NHL FaceOff 99 =

1998 video game

- Developer: Killer Game
- Publishers: NA: 989 Studios; EU: Sony Computer Entertainment
- Series: NHL FaceOff
- Platform: PlayStation
- Release: NA: September 30, 1998; EU: March 1999
- Genre: Sports
- Modes: Single-player, multiplayer

NHL FaceOff 99 is an ice hockey video game developed by Killer Game and published by Sony Computer Entertainment for the PlayStation. It was released in North America by 989 Studios. On the cover is then-Chicago Blackhawks player Chris Chelios.

== Reception ==
Reception

Aggregate score
Aggregator	Score
GameRankings	77%

Review scores
Publication	Score
AllGame	4/5
CNET Gamecenter	8/10
Electronic Gaming Monthly	7.375/10
Game Informer	7.75/10
GamePro	3.5/5
GameRevolution	C−
GameSpot	5.8/10
IGN	8.8/10
Official U.S. PlayStation Magazine	4/5
PlayStation: The Official Magazine	3.5/5

The game received "favorable" reviews according to the review aggregation website GameRankings.

Preceded by NHL FaceOff 98	NHL FaceOff 99; 1998	Succeeded by NHL FaceOff 2000
