= Split/Second: Velocity =

2010 racing video game

- European box art
- Developer: Black Rock Studio (Note: Digital Legends Entertainment ported the game to iOS. Sumo Digital ported the game to the PlayStation Portable system.)
- Publisher: Disney Interactive Studios
- Director: Nick Baynes
- Producer: Alice Guy
- Artist: Trevor Moore
- Composer: Marc Canham
- Platforms: Windows; PlayStation 3 PlayStation Portable; Xbox 360 iOS; OnLive
- Release: Windows, PlayStation 3, Xbox 360, iOS: NA: 18 May 2010; EU: 21 May 2010; PlayStation Portable: NA: 17 November 2010; EU: 19 November 2010
- Genre: Racing
- Modes: Single-player, multiplayer

Split/Second: Velocity (released in North America as Split/Second) is a racing video game developed by Black Rock Studio and published by Disney Interactive Studios for Windows, PlayStation 3 and Xbox 360 in May 2010. In the game, players take part in a fictional reality television show consisting of a variety of events, each focusing on destructible environments triggered remotely by driver actions known as "power plays".

Split/Second was ported to the PlayStation Portable in November 2010 by Sumo Digital, and was later released for OnLive in June 2011. Additionally, the game can be purchased from the Xbox digital store and played on Xbox One and Xbox Series consoles through the Xbox backwards compatibility program.

The game received positive reviews from critics but was unsuccessful commercially. It was the last game developed by Black Rock Studio before being closed by Disney in 2011.

== Gameplay ==
In Split/Second, players take part in a fictional reality TV programme where participants race for money and fame. Throughout a race, players can build up their "power play" meter by performing stunts, such as jumps and mid-air overtakes, and precision driving, such as drafting opponents and drifting. As players build up their meter, special events can be triggered, which create obstacles for other players, open up temporary shortcuts, or alter an entire section of the race course. These triggers are also activated by the AI opponents.

Target-rendered screenshot showing cars driving past an exploding airport terminal

Such events range from shockwave-inducing explosions to buckling highways and dam breaches. The severity of the events available to trigger varies depending on how full the player's meter is. The Level 1 events become available when one or two of the three segments of the bar are full, while the Level 2 events can only be triggered upon a full bar. Event locations, and the vehicles they will affect, are highlighted with blue icons for the level one power plays, and red icons for level two, and the player must time the action accurately in order to hinder the opposition as much as possible. The power play meter is used up by one segment once a level one event is triggered, so the player must also choose whether to activate the less destructive first-level events as soon as they are available, or save the power play energy and build it up further in order to trigger the top-tier actions.

There are also certain power plays that can be reused, such as explosives dropped from helicopters, exploding tankers, and shortcuts, but some other power plays are permanent and can only be used once in a single race. Black Rock Studio also wanted to make the HUD as simple as possible by taking away all unnecessary elements such as the speedometer and the track map (rendered useless due to the dynamic nature of the track) leaving only the lap count (also the target time in "Detonator" and "Air Revenge" modes as well as target score in "Air Strike" and "Survival" modes), the position that the player is in, and the power play meter, all positioned behind the player's car to avoid detracting from the scenery.

The game also has a multiplayer mode, with both 8-player online and 2-player split-screen offline available. There are 17 tracks in the standard game, most of which are located within or nearby a lifesize set of a city (shown under construction in the tutorial). Two tracks could be acquired as downloadable content, both of which take place in a quarry.

== Release ==
=== Downloadable content ===
A "time savers" DLC pack was released upon the game's launch, which unlocks all cars, tracks and modes without the player having to unlock them by playing through the game's "Season" mode.

The "High Octane Supercar" pack was released on 31 August 2010 as paid DLC, featuring the Cobretti Severus, the Ryback Vulcan, and the Hanzo Katana. In addition, the Elite Vehicle Livery and Ryback Cyclone Special (a stronger, upgraded version of a standard car) packs were released for free.

The next paid download was released as the "Survival at the Rock" pack and included a new Survival mode track (Minepit Park) and a new multiplayer-only mode (Survival Race; a racing variant of the Survival mode). It was released on 12 October.

Another vehicle pack, entitled the "Deadline" pack, was released on 20 October. The Deadline pack includes three new cars (the Hanzo Kanobo, Cobretti Centaur, and Ryback Javelin) and a new livery for the Ryback Coyote vehicle. Also included is the Deadline mode, a variation of Detonator (a time trial with automatically triggered power plays) where pickups spread across the track can pause the timer.

The final known pack is the "Quarry Onslaught" pack, released to Xbox Live Marketplace on 2 November of the same year. Included with this pack are the "Quarry" race course and the "Onslaught" game type. During an Onslaught event, racers are challenged to pull ahead of the competition while the helicopter fires missiles onto the track. Points are awarded based on how close to the front racers are, and the game will end after twenty missile waves.

All the downloadable content, with the exception of the two free addons, is available in Europe as part of the "Ultimate Edition", a complete bundle that also includes the digital version of the game.

=== PSP version ===
The PlayStation Portable (PSP) version was released on 17 November 2010, with porting and development duties handled by Sumo Digital. The PSP version of the game features, among other changes, an extra track based on the "Docks" environment. The track (simply called "The Docks") is a composite course that takes the drivers through areas from each of the three other Docks environment courses (Dry Docks, Ferry Wharf, and Port Bridge) in a single lap. The PSP version also adds new gameplay modes that offer variants on the core game (such as drifting around the training course to earn points). It also offers some changes to the game itself, such as revamped physics to make driving easier on the PSP. Subtle changes to track design, event rules, and car statistics were also made.

The PSP version supports ad-hoc multiplayer for up to four drivers.

=== Steam version ===
As part of Disney Interactive's new offering on Steam in late 2014, Split/Second was included alongside other titles such as Epic Mickey 2 and Pure. This version of the game does not have support for online multiplayer matchmaking, but VPN services can be used to facilitate online connections through the game's LAN features. There are also game cards and badges from Split/Second that can be earned.

== Reception ==
=== Critical reception ===
Reception

Aggregate scores
Aggregator	Score
GameRankings	84% (PS3); 82% (Xbox 360); 80% (PC); 65% (PSP); 60% (iOS)
Metacritic	84/100 (PS3); 82/100 (Xbox 360); 79/100 (PC); 63/100 (PSP)

Review scores
Publication	Score
1Up.com	A
Eurogamer	8/10
Game Informer	8.25/10
GameSpot	7.5/10
GameTrailers	8.4/10
Giant Bomb	4/5
IGN	8.5/10
Joystiq	4/5

Split/Second received "generally favorable reviews", except for the PSP version which received "mixed or average" reviews, according to review aggregator Metacritic.

During the 14th Annual Interactive Achievement Awards, the Academy of Interactive Arts & Sciences nominated Split/Second for "Racing Game of the Year".

=== Sales ===
Despite positive reviews from critics, the game was commercially unsuccessful. It sold only 86,000 copies in the United States in its first 12 days.

== Cancelled sequel ==
After finishing Episode 12, a cutscene is shown in which power plays in the city are activated by unknown perpetrators in construction vehicles (with the panicked voice of a TV crew member claiming that the group "were taken off air in '82") followed by a black screen reading "To be continued...".

In May 2011, Eurogamer spoke to an anonymous source that confirmed Disney Interactive Studios had made a reduction at Black Rock Studio's workforce. Due to Disney's new management, the game was cancelled in December 2010 despite attempts to fit with their new business model.
