= MotoGP '07 =

2007 video game

- Developers: Climax Racing; Rockpool Games (mobile)
- Publisher: THQ
- Platforms: Xbox 360; Microsoft Windows; Mobile phone
- Release: Mobile: NA: Summer 2007; Xbox 360: EU: August 24, 2007; NA: August 27, 2007; AU: September 2007; Windows: EU: September 28, 2007; AU: October 11, 2007
- Genre: Racing
- Modes: Single-player, multiplayer

MotoGP '07 is a 2007 racing game developed by Climax Racing and published by THQ. It is the fifth game in THQ's MotoGP series for Xbox 360, Microsoft Windows and mobile phones (the latter released as MotoGP 4). The purchase of the Climax Racing studio, developer of most of the previous titles in the series, from Climax Studios by Disney Interactive Studios led to speculation over who would be developing the game. However, a promo video on the Xbox Live Marketplace confirmed that the then-renamed Black Rock Studio were still involved in MotoGP '07.

== Features ==
MotoGP '07 features complete rider and team data, new 800cc MotoGP bikes and all 18 circuit of the 2007 MotoGP season. The title also features interactive track-side crowds, on-line tournament features, on-line "pink slip" racing, and a revamped Extreme mode. The revamped Extreme mode allows for over one million possible bike customizations.

In addition, minor gameplay changes have been made to the handling and braking to allow for easier player accessibility. Changes to acceleration and deceleration have been made to add to the realism which will make turns easier to navigate through. Slight fishtailing with hard braking has been put in to give a better feel for the handling of the bike and to let the player know how effective their braking is.

Also, the ability of the player to customise their bikes is greatly increased. In Extreme mode the player can upgrade their bike with various performance modifications: carbon brakes, race exhausts, magnesium/carbon wheels etc. In Grand Prix mode, the customisation is limited to visual upgrades, though MotoGP'07 now allows players greater control over the appearance of their bike. Despite this, some players have complained that the visual modifications are still fairly restrictive - the main criticism is that the custom paintwork option still restricts the player to the same limited amount of customisation as the previous games, despite the fact that the overall visual modification option has been overhauled. This leaves the player unable to design or customise the paint on their bike to approximate the level of design detail achieved by other AI racers.. Whether this issue will be resolved in future patches is not known.

In addition to this the PC version of the game features a corrupt model of the Yamaha M1 with the rear cowling misformed visible on Rossi and Edwards' bikes. Also the crowds in grandstands no longer work with post 2010's graphics drivers on the PC and shimmer.

=== Ilmor GP ===
The game features Ilmor GP to ride but in real life Ilmor rider Jeremy McWilliams crashed before the first Round of the season in Qatar, resulting in him not being able to take part in the race. Andrew Pitt, the second Rider, raced alone. Ilmor GP does not appear in more races since Ilmor quit the championship after Qatar.

However, Jeremy McWilliams and Andrew Pitt and the Ilmor GP bike are available to use as a playable rider and bike in the championship mode and race mode and in the quick races.

In championship mode, the Ilmor GP team was removed to avoid running against them.

In sports race, the player can use the Ilmor GP team to customize it and play with it in single races, but the team is not in the championship mode.

In quick race, one AI rider will be replaced for Jeremy McWilliams or Andrew Pitt, thus creating a 19-bike field in the MotoGP mode.

== Release ==
MotoGP '07 had a somewhat protracted release in the United Kingdom. While the Xbox release proceeded as planned, the PC version was delayed twice: originally delayed until the first week of September, and then delayed again until the eventual release date of September 28.

== Reception ==
Reception

Aggregate score
Aggregator	Score		
Aggregator	mobile	PC	Xbox 360
Metacritic	N/A	71/100	78/100

Review scores
Publication	Score		
Publication	mobile	PC	Xbox 360
Edge	N/A	N/A	7/10
Eurogamer	N/A	N/A	8/10
GamesMaster	N/A	N/A	88%
GameSpot	N/A	N/A	7.5/10
GamesTM	N/A	N/A	7/10
GameZone	6.7/10	N/A	N/A
IGN	7.5/10	N/A	7.7/10
Official Xbox Magazine (UK)	N/A	N/A	7/10
Official Xbox Magazine (US)	N/A	N/A	8.5/10
PC Zone	N/A	65%	N/A

The Xbox 360 version received "generally favorable reviews", while the PC version received "average" reviews, according to the review aggregation website Metacritic.
