= MotoGP: Ultimate Racing Technology 3 =

2005 video game

- Developer: Climax Racing
- Publisher: THQ
- Series: MotoGP
- Platforms: Windows; Xbox
- Release: Windows, Xbox: NA: 30 August 2005; EU: 2 September 2005
- Genre: Racing
- Modes: Single-player, multiplayer

MotoGP: Ultimate Racing Technology 3 is a motorcycle video game released in 2005. It is similar to MotoGP 2 but represents the 2004 Grand Prix motorcycle racing season. The game also features an Extreme Mode which is completely different from MotoGP class Counterparts featuring fictional road motorcycles and fictional representations of real-life locations & cities of respective MotoGP Circuits(like Autobahn Germany, Tokyo, Copacabana Rio de Janeiro, Barcelona City etc.) however the grid slots reduced from 20 to 10 bikes in the race. New Unlocking System has been introduced called Seed system in which, Players have to complete all 100 seeds to fulfill unlockables through championship career mode to be used in every game models other than single race mode where each and everything is unlocked. This game also introduces revamped career mode customization features with variety of liveries, leathers, helmets & decal designs to be applied on every bike unlike previous two installments where each bike had their own liveries.

MotoGP: Ultimate Racing Technology 3 also supported online multiplayer via Xbox Live. While Xbox Live for the original Xbox was shut down in 2010, the game is now playable online using replacement online servers for the Xbox called Insignia.

== Reception ==
Reception

Aggregate score
Aggregator	Score	
Aggregator	PC	Xbox
Metacritic	77/100	85/100

Review scores
Publication	Score	
Publication	PC	Xbox
1Up.com	N/A	A
Edge	N/A	7/10
Electronic Gaming Monthly	N/A	7.67/10
Eurogamer	7/10	N/A
GameSpot	7.6/10	8.9/10
GameSpy	N/A	4/5
GameZone	N/A	8.2/10
IGN	N/A	8.9/10
Official Xbox Magazine (US)	N/A	8/10
PC Gamer (US)	78%	N/A
Detroit Free Press	N/A	3/4
The Sydney Morning Herald	4/5	4/5

The game received "favorable" reviews on both platforms according to the review aggregation website Metacritic.
