= Cabela's Big Game Hunter: Ultimate Challenge =

2001 video game

- Cover art
- Developer: Coresoft
- Publisher: Activision
- Series: Cabela's Big Game Hunter
- Platform: PlayStation
- Release: NA: December 4, 2001
- Genres: Sports, first-person shooter
- Mode: Single-player

Cabela's Big Game Hunter Ultimate Challenge is a 2001 first-person shooter hunting video game. Released on December 4, 2001, it was the first Cabela's game to be released on the PlayStation console. The game was published by Activision.
