= Blades of Steel =

1987 video game

- PAL NES cover art
- Developers: Konami; Novotrade (C64, Amiga, MS-DOS)
- Publisher: Konami
- Programmer: Shigeharu Umezaki
- Composers: Shinya Sakamoto; Kazuki Muraoka; Atsushi Fujio; Kiyohiro Sada (Famicom Disk System/NES); Hidehiro Funauchi; Akiko Ito (Game Boy)
- Platforms: Arcade, Amiga, Commodore 64, MS-DOS, Family Computer Disk System, Game Boy, NES
- Release: October 1987: Arcade; NA: October 1987 Famicom Disk System; JP: July 22, 1988 NES; NA: December 1988; PAL: November 23, 1990 C64; NA: 1990 MS-DOS; NA: 1990 Amiga; NA: 1990 Game Boy; NA: August 1991; EU: 1991; JP: November 27, 1992
- Genre: Sports (ice hockey)
- Modes: Single-player, multiplayer

Blades of Steel, later released in Japan as Konamic Ice Hockey (コナミック アイスホッケー, Konamikku Aisu Hokkē), is an ice hockey video game released by Konami for North American arcades in 1987, and ported to the Family Computer Disk System and Nintendo Entertainment System in 1988. All teams are fictional but based out of real Canadian and American cities. The game is known for its fast-paced hockey action and especially for the fighting. It is a one or two player game. When playing against the computer, there are three difficulty levels to choose from: Junior, College, and Pro (with Pro being the most difficult and Junior being the easiest). Each team consists of three forwards, two defencemen, and a goaltender.

Two sequels were released: NHL Blades of Steel '99 and NHL Blades of Steel 2000. The NES version was re-released on Nintendo's Virtual Console service on December 24, 2007. The arcade version was re-released on Microsoft's Game Room service on November 24, 2010.

== Gameplay ==
NES screenshot

At the beginning of the game, players can select either "Exhibition" or "Tournament" matches. An exhibition match is just one game played against either the computer or another player. Tournament matches are similar to the NHL playoffs. It starts out as one team of the player's choice going against other teams in a playoff style tournament. The team that is successful in beating all of the opposing teams is awarded the Cup.

Fighting in the game is initiated whenever two players bump into each other three times in a row without hitting another player. The two players will stop skating and engage in pre-fight confrontation where they are able to exchange punches if they choose. If a player rapidly punches their opponent during the pre-fight, there is a chance they will knock their opponent down and neither player suffers a penalty. If mutual punches are thrown during the pre-fight sequence, then a voice yells "fight", the fight screen appears, and the gamers take control of their players. During the fight a player can punch high, punch low, block high, or block low and is given a health bar of five hits. The loser, the first person to get hit five times, is given a penalty and sent to the penalty box (the winner is not punished), creating a power play opportunity of 5-on-4 skaters. Up to four players can be penalized, for a maximum of a 5-on-1 advantage. If a fight occurs close to one of the nets, the referee may break up the fight and call a penalty shot.

During the second intermission, either a playable mini-game will appear for Player One to play or a Konami ad will appear featuring a bear shooting the puck into a net mouthing the words "Nice Shot!" The mini-game is actually an advertisement for Contra, Jackal and other Konami games, in which (at one point) a little spaceship is trying to destroy a much larger spaceship, this being a reference to Gradius.

If the score is tied at the end of the game, a shoot out (similar to a penalty shot) is used to determine the winner. Each team gets five shots. The team with the most goals after five shots is the winner. If, after that, the game is still tied, each team keeps getting one more shot until a winner is determined.

There are a total of eight teams (four from Canada and four from the United States), each one representing a city that housed an NHL team at the time of development. The four Canadian cities are Toronto, Vancouver, Montreal, and Edmonton. The four American teams are from New York, Chicago, Los Angeles and Minnesota. Teams are depicted with jerseys that vary in color.

This game also features distinct voice samples, which were rare at the time in NES games. The voice says "Blades of Steel!" on the title screen, "Faceoff" before each faceoff, "Fight" when a fight breaks out, "It's a pass" after a successful pass is made, "Penalty shot," and an "Aaahhh!" made by the losing player after a fight, or when a player skates into a goalie. The NES passing sound bite is garbled and has been interpreted as "With the pass", "It's a pass", etc. but the arcade passing bite is clearly audible and confirms the phrase as "Get the pass". The arcade version has a greater variety of sound bites and commentary owing to the hardware's better speech faculties and extra memory.

Blades of Steel differs from the professional game in the NHL in the late 1980s in that it has no offside rule, and its interpretation of penalties does not correspond to the rules of real ice hockey. The game's officials only call two penalties. Players who lose a fistfight are penalized for two minutes, an abstract reworking of the five-minute offsetting majors normally assigned in the event of a fight. Should a fight break out in front of one team's net, then the player on offense gets a penalty shot. The penalty shot is administered in the style of a soccer penalty shot, in that the shooting player must stand on the blue line, instead of moving towards the goaltender. The game also recognizes icing infractions, with an appropriate game reset and faceoff in the liable team's zone.

== Reception ==
Reception

Review scores
Publication	Score
AllGame	4.5/5 (NES)
IGN	7.5/10 (NES)

The game sold over 1 million units.

Blades of Steel has been well received by critics. Allgame editor Skyler Miller described the game as "one of the most enjoyable sports games of its era". Reviews of the Virtual Console release were mostly positive. Marcel van Duyn of Nintendo Life opined that the game has aged fairly well compared to other Konami sports titles on the NES such as Double Dribble. Dan Whitehead of Eurogamer was more critical of the game, stating that "The graphics aren't particularly good, even by 1987 NES standards, with the same model repeated over and over for the players, and some garish colour combinations are used to tell the teams apart." Electronic Gaming Monthly opted to exclude it from their "100 Best Games of All Time" in favor of Ice Hockey, explaining that "We realize Blades of Steel was an excellent game for its time, with far better graphics than Ice Hockey. But the fact is, if you had to pick between these two games today, Ice Hockey is clearly more fun. For sheer realism we can turn to one of the newer NHL games on the 32-bit systems."

== Legacy ==
Blades of Steel was followed by two sequels: NHL Blades of Steel '99 for the Nintendo 64 and NHL Blades of Steel 2000 for the PlayStation. Climax Studios developed Game Boy Color versions for both games.
