= NHL FaceOff 2001 =

2000 video game

- Developer: SolWorks
- Publisher: Sony Computer Entertainment
- Series: NHL FaceOff
- Platforms: PlayStation, PlayStation 2
- Release: PlayStation: NA: September 5, 2000; PlayStation 2: NA: February 6, 2001
- Genre: Sports
- Modes: Single-player, multiplayer

NHL FaceOff 2001 is an ice hockey video game developed by SolWorks and published by Sony Computer Entertainment for the PlayStation and PlayStation 2. It was released only in North America under 989 Sports. On the cover is then-Toronto Maple Leafs player Curtis Joseph.

== Reception ==
Reception

Aggregate score
Aggregator	Score	
Aggregator	PS	PS2
Metacritic	78/100	57/100

Review scores
Publication	Score	
Publication	PS	PS2
CNET Gamecenter	6/10	N/A
Electronic Gaming Monthly	8/10 (Note: Three critics of Electronic Gaming Monthly gave the PlayStation version each a score of 8.5/10, 8/10, and 7.5/10.)	6/10 (Note: Three critics of Electronic Gaming Monthly gave the PlayStation 2 version each a score of 6/10, 7.5/10 and 4.5/10.)
EP Daily	8/10	5.5/10
Game Informer	6.5/10	1/10
GameRevolution	N/A	D+
GameSpot	5.4/10	5.1/10
GameSpy	62%	N/A
IGN	N/A	6.3/10
Next Generation	N/A	2/5
Official U.S. PlayStation Magazine	4.5/5	3.5/5

The PlayStation version received "generally favorable reviews", while the PlayStation 2 version received "mixed" reviews, according to the review aggregation website Metacritic. Tom Russo of NextGen said that the latter console version was "Not terrible hockey, but it's a farm-league, rookie effort to the polished package and graphical splendor of EA's NHL 2001."

In one review, Cheat Monkey of GamePro called the PlayStation version "a genuine contender for the PlayStation Stanley Cup this year. It shows a lot more polish and precision than previous versions, and will give you hours of hard checking NHL and international team competition." (Note: GamePro gave the PlayStation version two 4.5/5 scores for graphics and fun factor, 3.5/5 for sound, and 4/5 for control in one review.) In another GamePro review, Air Hendrix said, "When the puck drops in the PlayStation rink, EA Sports' NHL 2001 takes the draw with its superior gameplay and control. If for some reason NHL 2001 doesn't get your skates flying, though, FaceOff 2001 is a worthy—although lesser—alternative." (Note: GamePro gave the PlayStation version two 4/5 scores for graphics and fun factor, 3/5 for sound, and 3.5/5 for control in another review.) However, he later said of the PlayStation 2 version, "When the final whistle blows, there's just no reason to step onto this ice. Stick with the far, far superior NHL 2001 for your PS2 hockey cravings." (Note: GamePro gave the PlayStation 2 version 2/5 for graphics, 2.5/5 for sound, 3.5/5 for control, and 3/5 for fun factor.)

== Notes ==
Preceded by NHL FaceOff 2000	NHL FaceOff 2001; 2000-2001	Succeeded by NHL FaceOff 2003
