= NHL FaceOff =

Video game series

NHL FaceOff is a video game series published by Sony Computer Entertainment and based on the National Hockey League. Originally released for the PlayStation, the game spawned many sequels for both the PlayStation and PlayStation 2, with the last one being released in 2002. It was one of the original SCEA sports games series for the PlayStation, along with NBA ShootOut, NFL GameDay, NCAA GameBreaker and ESPN Extreme Games (later renamed the Xtreme Games series). The first game was released in North America in 1995. The game featured multiplayer.

The series was later succeeded by Gretzky NHL 2005.

== Installments ==
| Title | Year | Platform(s) | Cover Athlete |
|---|---|---|---|
| NHL FaceOff | 1995 | PlayStation | Sergei Fedorov |
| NHL FaceOff '97 | 1996 | PlayStation | Paul Coffey |
| NHL FaceOff 98 | 1997 | PlayStation | John LeClair |
| NHL FaceOff 99 | 1998 | PlayStation | Chris Chelios |
| NHL FaceOff 2000 | 1999 | PlayStation | John LeClair |
| NHL FaceOff 2001 | 2000 | PlayStation, PlayStation 2 | Curtis Joseph |
| NHL FaceOff 2002 (cancelled game) | 2001 | PlayStation 2 | Luc Robitaille |
| NHL FaceOff 2003 | 2002 | PlayStation 2 | Rob Blake |

== See also ==
- ESPN National Hockey Night, Sony's predecessor for 16-bit consoles.
- List of ice hockey video games
