= NHL FaceOff 2003 =

2002 video game

- The cover of NHL FaceOff 2003, featuring then-Colorado Avalanche defenceman Rob Blake.
- Developer: SolWorks
- Publisher: Sony Computer Entertainment
- Series: NHL FaceOff
- Platform: PlayStation 2
- Release: NA: November 5, 2002
- Genre: Sports
- Modes: Single-player, multiplayer

NHL FaceOff 2003 is a 2002 ice hockey video game developed by SolWorks and published by Sony Computer Entertainment for the PlayStation 2. It was released only in North America under 989 Sports. It features then-Colorado Avalanche defenceman Rob Blake on its cover. Mike Emrick and Darren Pang return from the game's predecessor, NHL FaceOff 2001, to provide commentary.

== Features ==
New features in this installment of the NHL FaceOff series include a Career Mode, in which you control the General Manager of your favorite hockey team, doing managerial duties such as signing players, making trades and drafting. It also introduces a fully revamped game engine with over 700 new animations, as well as redesigned player and arena models.

The game was also the first “FaceOff” to be made exclusively for the PlayStation 2, as well as the first one without a version for the original PlayStation.

== Reception ==
Reception

Aggregate score
Aggregator	Score
Metacritic	55/100

Review scores
Publication	Score
GameSpot	4.6/10
GameSpy	3/5
GameZone	6.9/10
IGN	5.2/10
Official U.S. PlayStation Magazine	2/5
PlayStation: The Official Magazine	6/10
X-Play	2/5

NHL FaceOff 2003 received "mixed" reviews according to the review aggregation website Metacritic.

IGN's Chris Roper said, "The career mode is there, but you have to actually play the game to use it. The game also supports eight players, but you'll have to find others who want to play it first." GameSpot's Craig Beers said, "NHL FaceOff 2003 is a substandard hockey game [...] Everything this game tries to do is done better in other hockey games like EA's NHL series."

== See also ==
- NHL FaceOff

Preceded by NHL FaceOff 2001	NHL FaceOff 2003; 2002	Succeeded by Gretzky NHL 2005
