= Coresoft =

American video game developer

Coresoft is a video game developer based out of Lake Forest, California. The company was founded in June 1998. Coresoft has worked on platforms including the PlayStation, PlayStation 2, PS3, PSP, Wii, Xbox, Microsoft Windows, and iOS.

== Games developed ==
Year	Title	System	Publisher
2000	Magic: The Gathering Starter 6th Edition	PC	Wizards of the Coast
2001	Magic: The Gathering Starter 7th Edition	PC	Wizards of the Coast
2001	Saltwater Sportfishing	PS	Take-Two Interactive
2001	Cabela's Big Game Hunter: Ultimate Challenge	PS	Activision
2002	Big Bass Fishing	PS	Take-Two Interactive
2002	Cabela's Ultimate Deer Hunt: Open Season	PS	Activision
2003	Big Strike Bowling	PS	Gotham Games
2003	MTV's Celebrity Deathmatch	PS	Gotham Games
2003	Deer Hunter	PS2	Atari
2004	Magic: The Gathering Core Game 8th Edition	PC	Wizards of the Coast
2004	World Championship Poker	PS2; Xbox	Crave Entertainment
2005	Magic: The Gathering Core Game 9th Edition	PC	Wizards of the Coast
2005	World Poker Tour	PS2; Xbox; PSP	2K Sports
2006	Let's Ride: Silver Buckle Stables	PS2; PC	ValuSoft Games
2006	World Poker Championship 2: Final Table Championship	PC	ValuSoft Games
2006	NHRA Drag Racing: Quarter Mile Showdown	PC	ValuSoft Games
2007	World Championship Paintball	PS2	THQ
2007	High Stakes on the Vegas Strip: Poker Edition	PS3	Sony Online Entertainment
2008	Cake Mania: Baker's Challenge	PS2; PSP	Destineer
2009	Arcade Super Sniper 1 & 2	iOS	Coresoft
2009	Fantasy Aquarium World	Wii	Destineer
2010	Blood Beach	iOS; WiiWare	Coresoft
