= ATV: Quad Power Racing 2 =

2003 video game

- Developer: Climax Brighton
- Publisher: Acclaim Entertainment (Note: Released under the AKA Acclaim label)
- Platforms: PlayStation 2, GameCube, Xbox
- Release: NA: January 14, 2003 (PS2); NA: January 22, 2003 (GC, Xbox); EU: February 28, 2003
- Genre: Racing
- Modes: Single-player, multiplayer

ATV: Quad Power Racing 2 is a 2003 racing video game developed by Climax Brighton and published by Acclaim Entertainment under their AKA Acclaim label for PlayStation 2, GameCube and Xbox. It is the sequel to ATV: Quad Power Racing.

== Gameplay ==
General gameplay

ATV Quad Power Racing 2 includes overall 20 characters, 10 of which are original for the game and 10 professional ATV racing drivers. All 15 tracks are set over different terrains, like mud, sand or snow. There are multiple playable modes: Career (championship seasons), Arcade (increasingly difficult challenge), Challenge (racing against the top riders), Freestyle (based on scores achieved through aerials) and Time Trial (players race against the clock). During the race, every air jump that lands correctly will retain momentum and speed in an efficient way. The players are also able to kick the opponents off their rides at any time, and doing so steals the stored boost power for use. While there is no online play, the game has several multiplayer modes for two players in split screen: Championship, Freestyle Battle, Single Race, and Head-to-Head.

== Reception ==
Reception

Aggregate score
Aggregator	Score		
Aggregator	GameCube	PS2	Xbox
Metacritic	70/100	68/100	68/100

Review scores
Publication	Score		
Publication	GameCube	PS2	Xbox
Electronic Gaming Monthly	N/A	N/A	7.5/10
Eurogamer	N/A	7/10	N/A
Game Informer	8/10	N/A	7.5/10
GamePro	N/A	4/5	N/A
GameSpot	6.5/10	6.1/10	6.5/10
GameSpy	3/5	N/A	3/5
GameZone	7/10	7.2/10	7/10
IGN	6.5/10	6.8/10	6.6/10
Nintendo Power	3.4/5	N/A	N/A
Nintendo World Report	7.5/10	N/A	N/A
Official U.S. PlayStation Magazine	N/A	4/5	N/A
Official Xbox Magazine (US)	N/A	N/A	6.9/10
X-Play	3/5	N/A	N/A

The game received "average" reviews on all platforms according to the review aggregation website Metacritic.

== Cancelled sequel ==
At E3 2004, Acclaim Entertainment announced new titles for release, one of them being ATV Quad Power Racing 3 which was to be developed by Acclaim Studios Manchester instead of Climax Brighton and to be released in the winter of 2005. The game was later cancelled after Acclaim closed down the Acclaim Studios Manchester and Cheltenham studios due to their financial difficulties and eventual bankruptcy. The rights were obtained by Fund4Games and development was continued by Acclaim Studio Manchester's successor, Silverback Studios. The game was shown at E3 2005 behind closed doors. In 2012, game preservation group PtoPOnline revealed gameplay footage of a 2004 prototype under the name ATV 3 Lawless. A found trailer showed the name ATV 3 Outlaw Pro-Quad Racing.

With plans for a third ATV Quad Power Racing game scrapped, Climax Studios was eventually approached by Rainbow Studios for another opportunity to develop another ATV racing game, which would be to continue Rainbow Studio's ATV Offroad Fury series, starting with ATV Offroad Fury 3 in 2004, which Rainbow had to abandon after being purchased by THQ to develop MX Unleashed and the MX vs. ATV series. Climax Studios would go on to develop two installments of the Offroad Fury series on PlayStation 2 and port them both to the PlayStation Portable.
