= NHL FaceOff 2000 =

1999 video game

- Developer: SolWorks
- Publishers: NA: 989 Sports; EU: Sony Computer Entertainment
- Series: NHL FaceOff
- Platform: PlayStation
- Release: NA: September 15, 1999; UK: March 3, 2000
- Genre: Sports
- Modes: Single-player, multiplayer

NHL FaceOff 2000 is an ice hockey video game developed by 989 Sports and SolWorks and published by Sony Computer Entertainment for the PlayStation. On the cover is Philadelphia Flyers star John LeClair.

== Reception ==
Reception

Aggregate score
Aggregator	Score
GameRankings	70%

Review scores
Publication	Score
AllGame	3.5/5
CNET Gamecenter	6/10
Electronic Gaming Monthly	8.67/10
Game Informer	7.25/10
GameFan	93% (Note: In GameFan's viewpoint of the game, one critic gave it a score of 94, and the other 92.)
GamePro	3.5/5 (Note: GamePro gave the game 4/5 for graphics, 2.5/5 for sound, and two 3.5/5 scores for control and overall fun factor.)
GameSpot	6.4/10
Hyper	71%
IGN	6.8/10
Next Generation	4/5
PlayStation Official Magazine – UK	7/10
Official U.S. PlayStation Magazine	4/5
USA Today	3/4

The game received "average" reviews according to the review aggregation website GameRankings. Jim Preston of NextGen called it "An impressive effort. If you don't like the style of NHL 2000, this may be the one for you."

== Notes ==
Preceded by NHL FaceOff 99	NHL FaceOff 2000; 1999	Succeeded by NHL FaceOff 2001
