= High Stakes on the Vegas Strip: Poker Edition =

2007 video game

- Developer: Coresoft
- Publisher: Sony Online Entertainment
- Platform: PlayStation 3
- Release: NA: September 13, 2007; EU: December 18, 2007
- Genre: Card game
- Modes: Single-player, multiplayer

High Stakes on the Vegas Strip: Poker Edition is a downloadable game on the PlayStation Store. It was released on September 13, 2007.

The game features voice chat options for online multiplayer games (with compatible headsets). The game now has webcam functionality, with support for PC-compatible USB cameras such as the EyeToy and PlayStation Eye.

== Gameplay ==
Before playing, the player has the option to customize the avatar, the location, and the type of poker played. The game features five types of poker: Billabong, Shanghai, Tahoe, super hold'em and Texas hold'em. A patch for this game allows it to be played remotely on the PSP system.

== Reception ==
Reception

Review scores
Publication	Score
GameSpot	7.0/10
IGN	6.5/10

IGN gave High Stakes on the Vegas Strip: Poker Edition a 6.5/10, calling it "a solid game", but noting the game's lack of features compared to other poker titles due to its low price point. GameSpot gave it a 7.0/10, calling it "a worthwhile download for PS3-owning poker fans" due to its good AI, online community, and low price.
