= Black Rock Studio =

British video game developer

Black Rock Studio Limited
- Formerly: Pixel Planet (1998–1999); Climax Studios Limited (1999–2003); Climax Studios (Brighton) Limited (2003–2004); Climax Driving Limited (2004); Climax Racing Limited (2004–2006)
- Type: Subsidiary
- Industry: Video games
- Founded: 1998; 28 years ago
- Founder: Tony Beckwith
- Defunct: 2011; 15 years ago
- Fate: Liquidation
- Headquarters: Brighton, United Kingdom
- Number of employees: 300
- Parent: Climax Studios (1999–2006); Disney Interactive Studios (2006–2011)
- Website: disney.co.uk/disneyinteractivestudios/blackrockstudio

Black Rock Studio Limited was a British video game developer based in Brighton, England. It was a division of Disney Interactive Studios. The studio was founded by Tony Beckwith in 1998 as Pixel Planet. It was acquired by the Climax Group in 1999 and was renamed Climax Brighton. In 2004, it became Climax Racing, as the Climax Group rebranded its studios. On 28 September 2006, it was acquired by DIS (formerly known as Buena Vista Games in that time) and was eventually renamed Black Rock Studio in 2007. The last game the studio developed for the Climax Group was MotoGP '07, which was completed after its acquisition by Buena Vista Games. The name is derived from a district in Brighton. In early 2011, the company faced lay-offs and was forced to abandon sequels for Pure and Split/Second: Velocity. Despite good reviews for both games, Disney turned down both sequels to focus on freemium content.

On 30 June 2011, Disney Interactive Studios announced its intent to enter a consultation process on the proposal to close the studios. It was later confirmed that the studio has been shut down and that several 300 ex-employees have formed new studios, including Studio Gobo, West Pier Studio, Roundcube Entertainment, ShortRound Games, and Boss Alien.

== Games ==
| Year | Title | Platform(s) |
|---|---|---|
as Climax Brighton
| 2002 | Gumball 3000 | PlayStation 2 |
| 2002 | MotoGP: Ultimate Racing Technology | Windows, Xbox |
| 2002 | Rally Fusion: Race of Champions | PlayStation 2, Xbox |
| 2003 | ATV: Quad Power Racing 2 | GameCube, PlayStation 2, Xbox |
| 2003 | MotoGP: Ultimate Racing Technology 2 | Windows, Xbox |
| 2003 | The Italian Job | GameCube, PlayStation 2, Xbox |
| 2003 | Hot Wheels: World Race | GameCube, PlayStation 2, Windows |
as Climax Racing
| 2004 | ATV Offroad Fury 3 | PlayStation 2, PlayStation Portable |
| 2004 | Crash 'n' Burn | Xbox, PlayStation 2 |
| 2004 | Hot Wheels: Stunt Track Challenge | Xbox, PlayStation 2, Windows |
| 2005 | MotoGP: Ultimate Racing Technology 3 | Windows, Xbox |
| 2006 | MotoGP '06 | Xbox 360 |
| 2006 | ATV Offroad Fury 4 | PlayStation 2, PlayStation Portable |
| 2007 | MotoGP '07 | Windows, Xbox 360 |
as Black Rock Studio
| 2008 | Pure | PlayStation 3, Windows, Xbox 360 |
| 2010 | Split/Second: Velocity | PlayStation 3, Windows, Xbox 360 |
