= MotoGP: Ultimate Racing Technology =

2002 video game

- Developers: Visual Impact (GBA); Climax Brighton (Windows, Xbox); Cybiko (Mobile); THQ (N-Gage)
- Publisher: THQ
- Platforms: Game Boy Advance, Xbox, Windows, mobile phone, N-Gage
- Release: February 15, 2002: Game Boy Advance; EU: February 15, 2002; NA: March 4, 2002 Xbox; NA: May 20, 2002; EU: May 24, 2002 Windows; EU: June 28, 2002 Mobile June 13, 2003 N-Gage; EU: November 10, 2003; NA: November 14, 2003
- Genre: Racing
- Modes: Single-player, multiplayer

MotoGP: Ultimate Racing Technology, known in the United States as simply MotoGP, is a Grand Prix motorcycle racing video game for Game Boy Advance, Xbox, Microsoft Windows, mobile phones, and N-Gage. It is based on the 2001 Grand Prix motorcycle racing season.

The game's features include weather effects, a dynamic replay mode and custom soundtracks. The game includes 10 real-world race tracks and all the riders and bikes from the 2001 MotoGP season. The menu theme music is Psynn by Shawn Hargreaves.

An online-enabled demo of MotoGP shipped with Xbox Live starter kits in 2002. Players who didn't own the full game could access 23 riders and three courses while players who did own the full game could access all the content they had unlocked.

== Gameplay ==
In the Xbox version, players can use career, training, and arcade modes, with career requiring a created rider, training carrying that rider's progression into career, and arcade rewarding stylish riding with unlocks. The Game Boy Advance version includes quick race, time attack, tournament, and grand prix modes, as well as four-player multiplayer.

== Reception ==
Reception

Aggregate scores
Aggregator	Score				
Aggregator	GBA	mobile	N-Gage	PC	Xbox
GameRankings	68%	N/A	36%	78%	87%
Metacritic	67/100	N/A	31/100	N/A	84/100

Review scores
Publication	Score				
Publication	GBA	mobile	N-Gage	PC	Xbox
Edge	N/A	N/A	N/A	N/A	8/10
Electronic Gaming Monthly	N/A	N/A	4/10	N/A	8.67/10
Eurogamer	N/A	N/A	N/A	N/A	9/10
Famitsu	27/40	N/A	N/A	N/A	N/A
Game Informer	5/10	N/A	N/A	N/A	8/10
GamePro	N/A	N/A	1.5/5	N/A	N/A
GameSpot	7.1/10	N/A	2.7/10	N/A	8.5/10
GameSpy	60%	N/A	1/5	N/A	4.5/5
GameZone	7.3/10	N/A	4.9/10	N/A	9.3/10
IGN	6.9/10	5/10	3/10	N/A	8.8/10
Jeuxvideo.com	8/20	N/A	7/20	14/20	14/20
Nintendo Power	3.6/5	N/A	N/A	N/A	N/A
Official Xbox Magazine (US)	N/A	N/A	N/A	N/A	7.9/10

The Xbox version received "favorable" reviews, and the Game Boy Advance version received "average" reviews, while the N-Gage version received "unfavorable" reviews, according to the review aggregation website Metacritic. In Japan, where the GBA version was ported and published by MTO on October 25, 2002, Famitsu gave it a score of 27 out of 40.

MotoGP was nominated for GameSpot's annual "Best Graphics (Technical)" and "Best Driving Game" among Xbox games, and was a runner-up for the publication's "Best Driving Game on Game Boy Advance" prize. The game was also a nominee for "Console Racing Game of the Year" at the AIAS' 6th Annual Interactive Achievement Awards, which ultimately went to Need for Speed: Hot Pursuit 2.
