= Gretzky NHL 2005 =

2004 video game

- PlayStation 2 cover art
- Developer: Page 44 Studios
- Publisher: Sony Computer Entertainment
- Platforms: PlayStation 2, PlayStation Portable
- Release: PlayStation 2: NA: November 9, 2004; PlayStation Portable: NA: March 14, 2005
- Genre: Sports
- Modes: Single-player, multiplayer

Gretzky NHL 2005 is a 2004 ice hockey video game developed by Page 44 Studios and published by Sony Computer Entertainment for the PlayStation 2. Released under the 989 Sports label, it is the successor to the NHL FaceOff series, and features professional NHL hockey player Wayne Gretzky. A port to the PlayStation Portable titled Gretzky NHL was released in 2005. Mike Emrick provides commentary for the game. The PS2 version has Wayne Gretzky on the cover in a New York Rangers uniform. It was succeeded by Gretzky NHL 06.

== Reception ==
Reception

Aggregate score
| Aggregator | Score | |
| Aggregator | PS2 | PSP |
|---|---|---|
| Metacritic | 66/100 | 61/100 |

Review scores
| Publication | Score | |
| Publication | PS2 | PSP |
|---|---|---|
| 1Up.com | N/A | C |
| Game Informer | 6.5/10 | 6/10 |
| GamePro | 3/5 | 3.5/5 |
| GameRevolution | N/A | C+ |
| GameSpot | 6.9/10 | 6/10 |
| GameSpy | 3/5 | 1.5/5 |
| GameZone | 7.4/10 | 8/10 |
| IGN | 8.3/10 | 7.5/10 |
| Official U.S. PlayStation Magazine | 2.5/5 | 3.5/5 |
| X-Play | 3/5 | 2/5 |

The game received "mixed or average reviews" on both platforms according to the review aggregation website Metacritic.

| Preceded by NHL FaceOff 2003 | Gretzky NHL 2005; 2004 | Succeeded by Gretzky NHL 2006 |
