= MotoGP '06 =

2006 video game

- Developer: Climax Racing
- Publisher: THQ
- Platform: Xbox 360
- Release: EU: June 9, 2006; NA: June 13, 2006
- Genre: Racing
- Modes: Single-player, multiplayer

MotoGP '06 is a Grand Prix motorcycle racing video game for the Xbox 360. It is based on the 2005 and 2006 MotoGP seasons.

== Reception ==
Reception

Aggregate score
Aggregator	Score
Metacritic	80/100

Review scores
Publication	Score
Edge	8/10
Eurogamer	8/10
Famitsu	29/40
Game Informer	8.75/10
GameRevolution	B−
GameSpot	8.2/10
GameSpy	4/5
GameTrailers	8.6/10
GameZone	8.4/10
IGN	8.4/10
Official Xbox Magazine (US)	8/10
Detroit Free Press	2/4
The Sydney Morning Herald	4/5

The game received "favorable" reviews according to the review aggregation website Metacritic. In Japan, where the game was ported for release on October 12, 2006, Famitsu gave it a score of 29 out of 40.
