= MotoGP 4 =

2005 video game

- Cover art featuring Valentino Rossi (in front) and Nicky Hayden
- Developer: Namco
- Publishers: EU: Sony Computer Entertainment; JP: Namco; NA: Namco Bandai Games
- Composer: Tetsukazu Nakanishi
- Platform: PlayStation 2
- Release: EU: May 27, 2005; JP: September 15, 2005; NA: June 20, 2006
- Genre: Racing
- Modes: Single-player; Multiplayer

MotoGP 4 (often stylized as MotoGP4) is a racing video game developed and published by Namco for the PlayStation 2. It is the fourth and last MotoGP game to be released exclusively on the PlayStation 2.

== Features ==
The game features are based on the 2004 MotoGP season. The game allows the player to race in 5 game modes: Quick Race, Time Attack, Championship, Challenges and Multiplayer in a variety of difficulties and weather conditions.

Daijiro Kato, who died a season prior, makes an appearance in the game as one of the game's unlockable legend riders. Suzuka Circuit, which was also dropped from the MotoGP calendar the season the game is based on following Kato's fatal accident, is also included as a bonus track.

The North American release was delayed until mid-2006 to add a feature exclusive to that version, online multiplayer for up to eight players.

== Reception ==
Reception

Aggregate score
Aggregator	Score
Metacritic	71/100

Review scores
Publication	Score
1Up.com	B+
Eurogamer	6/10
Famitsu	31/40
GameSpot	7.6/10
GameSpy	3.5/5
GameTrailers	7.2/10
GameZone	7/10
IGN	7/10
Official U.S. PlayStation Magazine	8.5/10
PlayStation: The Official Magazine	6/10
The Sydney Morning Herald	3.5/5

The game received "average" reviews according to the review aggregation website Metacritic. In Japan, Famitsu gave it a score of one seven and three eights for a total of 31 out of 40.
