= Gretzky NHL 06 =

2005 video game

- Developer: Page 44 Studios
- Publisher: Sony Computer Entertainment
- Platforms: PlayStation 2, PlayStation Portable
- Release: PlayStation 2: NA: September 20, 2005; PlayStation Portable: NA: October 4, 2005
- Genre: Sports
- Modes: Single-player, multiplayer

Gretzky NHL 06 is a 2005 ice hockey video game developed by Page 44 Studios and published by Sony Computer Entertainment for the PlayStation 2 and PlayStation Portable. The last NHL game to be published by Sony and the first to not involve 989 Sports, it is the sequel to Gretzky NHL 2005. It features professional NHL player Wayne Gretzky. It was Mike Emrick and Darren Pang provide color commentary for the game. It features officially licensed NHL on NBC branding during gameplay. The NBC Sports integration was later used in the EA Sports NHL series, beginning with NHL 15 in 2014. The PS2 version features Wayne Gretzky on the cover in an Edmonton Oilers and New York Rangers uniform, as well as himself as a coach.

== Reception ==
Reception

Aggregate score
Aggregator	Score	
Aggregator	PS2	PSP
Metacritic	62/100	65/100

Review scores
Publication	Score	
Publication	PS2	PSP
Game Informer	7/10	N/A
GameSpot	6.5/10	6.3/10
GameSpy	2/5	3.5/5
GameZone	8/10	7.2/10
IGN	6.8/10	7/10
Official U.S. PlayStation Magazine	1/5	2.5/5
PlayStation: The Official Magazine	5/10	6.5/10
X-Play	2/5	3/5

The game received "mixed or average reviews" on both platforms according to the review aggregation website Metacritic.

Preceded by Gretzky NHL 2005	Gretzky NHL 2006; 2005	Succeeded by N/A
