= World Championship Poker =

- PAL region PS2 cover art
- Developers: Coresoft (WCP1); Point of View (WCP2)
- Publishers: Crave Entertainment, Play It, Oxygen Games, 505 Games
- Platforms: PlayStation 2, Game Boy Advance, Nintendo DS, Windows, Xbox, Xbox 360, PSP, Wii
- Release: WCP: Game Boy Advance; NA: November 3, 2004; PAL: March 24, 2005 PlayStation 2; NA: November 18, 2004; PAL: October 7, 2005 Xbox; NA: November 30, 2004 Nintendo DS; NA: April 5, 2005; AU: October 25, 2007 GameCube / Cancelled; NA: November 14, 2006; WCP 2: Xbox; NA: November 3, 2005 Windows; NA: November 8, 2005; PAL: April 20, 2007 PlayStation 2; NA: November 8, 2005; PAL: September 21, 2007 PlayStation Portable; NA: December 11, 2005; PAL: October 19, 2007; WCP: All In: PlayStation 2; NA: August 29, 2006; PAL: April 20, 2007 Xbox 360; NA: August 29, 2006; AU: November 15, 2007; EU: November 30, 2007 PlayStation Portable; NA: September 5, 2006; EU: October 26, 2007; AU: March 13, 2008 Wii; NA: May 29, 2007; PAL: October 19, 2007; WCC: PlayStation 2/PSP; NA: May 13, 2008
- Genre: Cards
- Modes: Single-player, multiplayer

World Championship Poker is a series of poker video games first developed by Coresoft and released in 2004 by Crave Entertainment. The series capitalizes on the recent popularity of poker due to the successful World Series of Poker.

The first title of the series, World Championship Poker received generally favorable reviews when it was released. GameSpot criticized the title for its lack of refinement but acknowledged its multiplayer appeal. The GameCube version was cancelled.

In North America, the standard edition of the game carries an Everyone rating from the ESRB, but the special edition which includes the bonus Howard Lederer Tells All DVD carries a Mature rating.

== World Championship Poker 2: Featuring Howard Lederer ==
The sequel was released a year later and improved upon some of the criticism found in the previous version. GameSpot's review complimented the computer AI and the use of online across all platforms.

== World Championship Poker: Featuring Howard Lederer "All In" ==
The third game in the series was first released nine months later for the PlayStation 2, PlayStation Portable, and Xbox 360. Reviews for the game were mediocre, receiving an overall score that was lower than its predecessors. GameSpot criticized it for not introducing newer elements as had been done with competing franchises. A version for the Wii was then released in 2007, being developed by Point of View. It is known that the title will allow players to utilize the motion-sensing functionality of the Wii Remote to play the game.

== World Championship Cards ==
A fourth game was made that was devoid of Poker. It was made with the same engine as the last World Championship Poker title, but with a lot of the newer features removed for this title. It was released for the PS2 and PSP.

== See also ==
World Series of Poker: Tournament of Champions
