= World Poker Tour (video game) =

2005 video game

- Developers: Backbone Emeryville (GBA); Coresoft
- Publisher: 2K
- Platforms: Game Boy Advance, PlayStation 2, Xbox, PlayStation Portable
- Release: NA: October 18, 2005; AU: January 27, 2006; EU: March 10, 2006; PSP: AU: February 20, 2006; NA: April 18, 2006; EU: June 2, 2006
- Genre: Card game
- Mode: Single-player

World Poker Tour is a poker video game developed by Backbone Emeryville and Coresoft and published by 2K for Game Boy Advance, PlayStation 2, and Xbox in 2005, and for PlayStation Portable in 2006. It is based on the World Poker Tour, an internationally televised gaming and entertainment brand.

== Development ==
The game was showcased at E3 2005. Commentary in the game was provided by Mike Sexton and Vince Van Patten.

== Reception ==
Reception

Aggregate score
Aggregator	Score			
Aggregator	GBA	PS2	PSP	Xbox
Metacritic	65/100	60/100	68/100	63/100

Review scores
Publication	Score			
Publication	GBA	PS2	PSP	Xbox
Eurogamer	N/A	5/10	N/A	N/A
GameRevolution	N/A	C−	N/A	C−
GameSpot	N/A	7.1/10	6.8/10	7.1/10
GameSpy	N/A	2/5	N/A	3/5
GameZone	N/A	7.1/10	N/A	7.3/10
IGN	7/10	7/10	7/10	7/10
Official U.S. PlayStation Magazine	N/A	3/5	3.5/5	N/A
Official Xbox Magazine (US)	N/A	N/A	N/A	7.5/10
Pocket Gamer	N/A	N/A	3/5	N/A
TeamXbox	N/A	N/A	N/A	6.9/10

The game received "mixed or average reviews" on all platforms according to the review aggregation website Metacritic.
