= NHL FaceOff 98 =

1997 video game

- Developer: Killer Game
- Publisher: Sony Computer Entertainment
- Composer: Joey Kuras
- Series: NHL FaceOff
- Platform: PlayStation
- Release: NA: October 31, 1997; EU: April 1998
- Genre: Sports video game
- Modes: Single-player, multiplayer

NHL FaceOff 98 is an ice hockey video game developed by Killer Game and published by Sony Computer Entertainment for the PlayStation. It is part of the NHL FaceOff series, and was the first installment to use polygonal players.

== Reception ==
Reception

Aggregate score
Aggregator	Score
GameRankings	74%

Review scores
Publication	Score
AllGame	4/5
Electronic Gaming Monthly	6.875/10
Game Informer	8.25/10
GameFan	93% (Note: Two critics of GameFan gave the game a score of 93 each.)
GameRevolution	C+
GameSpot	5/10
Hyper	79%
IGN	8/10
Next Generation	3/5
Official U.S. PlayStation Magazine	5/5

Reviews for NHL FaceOff 98 were wildly divergent, with critics expressing contradicting opinions on numerous aspects of the game. Kraig Kujawa and John Ricciardi of Electronic Gaming Monthly found the A.I. too easy even on the hardest setting, but their co-reviewer Kelly Rickards complained that it is frustratingly difficult. While GameSpot's Jeff Gerstmann and GamePro said the on-ice sound effects were well done, Kujawa and IGN's early review both said they lack excitement and atmosphere. Though Next Generation said the game "doesn't control very well", and GameSpot and IGN found the control configuration overcomplicated and confusing even when icon passing is enabled, Kujawa and IGN actually praised the control as tight, responsive, and realistic. And though most reviews praised the lifelike animation of the players, GameSpot and GamePro complained at the stiff animation when the players are skating around (as opposed to shooting or checking).

The one point most critics agreed upon was that NHL FaceOff 98 came in second to NHL 98. The Electric Playground's Tommy Tallarico (whose studio had done the sound for the game) was an exception, calling it the best hockey game of the season and giving it a 9.7, while co-host Victor Lucas gave it a 9 and also said NHL 98 was better. GamePro summarized, "A roster of strong improvements nicely tunes up this year's outing, but NHL '98 still outclasses it in almost every category." (Note: GamePro gave the game two 4/5 scores for graphics and sound, and two 3.5/5 scores for control and overall fun factor.) Next Generation stated that "The gameplay features and stats are nearly identical to all of the other hockey games coming out, but NHL Face Off is a game that doesn't have enough life or personality of its own to separate itself from the pack, meaning once again that it's the second-best hockey game on PlayStation." Kujawa likewise concluded that "NHL Face Off 98 is a great hockey game, but only good enough to rank second best to EA's NHL 98." Gerstmann gave a more dismal assessment, calling the game "simply average".
