= Pure (video game) =

2008 off-road racing video game

- European cover art
- Developer: Black Rock Studio
- Publisher: Disney Interactive Studios
- Director: Jason Avent
- Producer: Ian Monaghan
- Artist: Trevor Moore
- Platforms: PlayStation 3 Windows; Xbox 360
- Release: NA: 23 September 2008; EU: 25 September 2008; AU: 2 October 2008; AU: 30 October 2008 (PC)
- Genre: Racing
- Modes: Single-player, multiplayer

Pure is an off-road, quad-bike trick-racing video game for Xbox 360, PlayStation 3 and Windows published by Disney Interactive Studios and developed by Black Rock Studio (formerly Climax Racing, the developers of the MotoGP and ATV Offroad Fury series). The game was announced on 14 February 2008. The game incorporates a trick system that rewards the player with speed boosts for successfully pulling off tricks.

== Gameplay ==
Players race with quad bikes in locations across the world, pulling off incredible stunts at extreme heights. There are three different race types:

- Race: Standard races over 3 laps. The tracks have plenty of turns and vertigo-inducing jumps. The player has to stay on top of the chart and keep pulling "fresh" tricks to win.
- Freestyle: Perform and combo as many tricks as possible before running out of gas. In the end, the player with the highest score wins.
- Sprint: Short races over 5 laps. Sprint tracks have only one or two small jumps and many hard turns, placing increased importance on turns as opposed to stunts.

The game has a trick system that monitors what kind of tricks the player has been showing off. If the player repeats the same trick, it becomes "stale", earning less points, but new tricks are "fresh" and score more points. Tricks add to a player's "thrill bar", with higher-level tricks becoming available as the bar is filled. If the bar is full, the player may perform a "special trick" given a high enough jump. The bar may deplete if boost is used or if the player crashes after an unsuccessful trick.

== Development ==
Pure director Jason Avent assured gamers that the Xbox 360 and PlayStation 3 versions would run identically. The game had a marketing budget of $10 million.

At E3 2008, Pure was awarded Best Racing Game of E3 2008 by the Game Critics Awards, Editors’ Choice Award from Official Xbox Magazine (U.S.), Best Driving Game from GameTrailers.com and Best Racing Game on Xbox 360 from IGN.

A demo was released on the PlayStation Network and Xbox Live Marketplace on 4 September 2008. The demo features one level of play. The PC demo was made available in October 2008.

During the 2009 holiday season, Pure and Lego Batman were bundled with select Xbox 360 packages as a bonus.

== Reception ==
Reception

Aggregate score
Aggregator	Score		
Aggregator	PC	PS3	Xbox 360
Metacritic	80/100	83/100	85/100

Review scores
Publication	Score		
Publication	PC	PS3	Xbox 360
1Up.com	N/A	B+	B+
Eurogamer	N/A	N/A	8/10
Famitsu	N/A	29/40	(X360) 31/40; 29/40
Game Informer	N/A	8.5/10	8.5/10
GameDaily	N/A	9/10	9/10
GameRevolution	B+	B+	B+
GameSpot	N/A	8/10	8/10
GameSpy	N/A	4/5	4/5
GameTrailers	N/A	8.6/10	N/A
Giant Bomb	N/A	4/5	4/5
IGN	8.4/10	(AU) 8.8/10 (US) 8.6/10	(AU) 8.8/10 (US) 8.6/10
Official Xbox Magazine (US)	N/A	N/A	9/10
PC Gamer (US)	82%	N/A	N/A
PlayStation: The Official Magazine	N/A	4.5/5	N/A
411Mania	N/A	N/A	8.4/10
Variety	N/A	(favourable)	N/A

Pure received "favourable" reviews on all platforms according to the review aggregation website Metacritic. In Japan, where the PC version was ported and published by E-Frontier on 12 June 2009, followed by the PlayStation 3 and Xbox 360 versions (the former by Codemasters) on 25 June 2009, all under the name Extreme Racing: Pure (エクストリーム・レーシング -PURE-, Ekusutorīmu Rēshingu -Pure-), Famitsu gave the console versions each a score of one eight and three sevens for a total of 29 out of 40, while Famitsu X360 gave the Xbox 360 version each a score of one seven and three eights for a total of 31 out of 40.

GamePro gave the Xbox 360 version four stars out of five, calling it "a simple, straightforward game: go fast and pull out your best tricks. Fortunately, there's depth to be had if you're eager to invest the effort." Michael Lafferty of GameZone gave the PlayStation 3 version 8.8 out of 10, saying, "Pure fun, Pure entertainment, Pure eye candy – that's what you get with this title. The game does have some small failings, but nothing totally worth mentioning. What is compelling about this title are the tracks, the air and the way the terrain will affect your ATV. This is great fun." Edge gave the PlayStation 3 version seven out of ten, saying, "The pleasure of launching into a panoramic, dolly-zoomed abyss and triggering an implausible series of aerial gymnastics is as primal a thrill as it ever was."

During the Academy of Interactive Arts & Sciences' 12th Annual Interactive Achievement Awards, the game was nominated for the "Racing Game of the Year" award, which went to Burnout Paradise.
