= Rally Fusion: Race of Champions =

2002 video game

- Developer: Climax Brighton
- Publisher: Activision
- Platforms: PlayStation 2, Xbox
- Release: EU: November 20, 2002; NA: December 12, 2002
- Genre: Racing
- Mode: Single-player

Rally Fusion: Race of Champions is a racing game released for the PlayStation 2 and Xbox consoles in 2002. It was developed by Climax Brighton and published by Activision.

== Gameplay ==
The game was based on the Race of Champions held in Gran Canaria, it featured 19 different cars such as the Lancia 037, Peugeot 306 Maxi and the ROC buggy. 19 different tracks were used but many never featured in the real race of champions.

== Reception ==
- GameRankings: 74.78%
- Official PlayStation Magazine UK: 6/10
- IGN: 8.0/10

== See also ==
- Michelin Rally Masters: Race of Champions
