= ATV Offroad Fury 3 =

2004 video game

- Developers: Climax Racing; Climax LA (PSP)
- Publishers: NA: Sony Computer Entertainment; EU: SouthPeak Interactive
- Artist: Trevor Moore
- Series: ATV Offroad Fury
- Platforms: PlayStation 2 PlayStation Portable
- Release: NA: November 2, 2004; EU: February 10, 2006; PlayStation Portable: NA: April 19, 2005; EU: February 10, 2006
- Genre: Racing
- Modes: Single-player, multiplayer

ATV Offroad Fury 3 is a racing video game developed by Climax Racing and published by Sony Computer Entertainment for the PlayStation 2. It was released on November 2, 2004 in North America and on February 10, 2006 in Europe by SouthPeak Interactive. An enhanced version for the PlayStation Portable titled ATV Offroad Fury: Blazin' Trails was released in April 2005.

The game was succeeded by ATV Offroad Fury 4 in 2006.

== Gameplay ==
Expanding from its predecessor, ATV Offroad Fury 3 features more ATVs, along with more championships, mini-games and improved physics. As is with the rest of the series, the game revolves around racing all-terrain vehicles (ATVs) around dirt racetracks. In addition to racing, another major focus of the game is stunts. Stunts can be achieved by tapping a combination of buttons while the player's ATV is in the air. Each stunt requires a different amount of time to perform. The game also provides "free-roaming offroad gameplay".

The PlayStation 2 version offers online multiplayer via i-Link, local area network (LAN) or other network connections. The PlayStation Portable version offers online multiplayer via a WiFi connection.

The game contains features for customizability, such as choosing parts for ATV, changing color schemes, and even creating one's own unique logo.

== Development ==
ATV Offroad Fury 3 is the first game in the series not to be developed by Rainbow Studios as the company was acquired by THQ nearly a year prior to the release of Fury 2. As Rainbow Studios began working with THQ to develop MX Unleashed and start the MX vs. ATV series that serves as a crossover with THQ's MX trilogy, it approached Climax Racing, known for developing the ATV Quad Power Racing duology, to offer an opportunity to make another ATV racing game by continuing the Offroad Fury series.

== Reception ==
Reception

Aggregate score
Aggregator	Score
Metacritic	78/100

Review scores
Publication	Score
Electronic Gaming Monthly	7.5/10
Eurogamer	6/10
Game Informer	7/10
GameSpot	7.5/10
GameSpy	4/5
GameZone	8.8/10
IGN	9.2/10
Official U.S. PlayStation Magazine	4/5
VideoGamer.com	5/10
X-Play	4/5
Detroit Free Press	3/4
The Sydney Morning Herald	3/5

ATV Offroad Fury 3 received "generally favorable" reviews according to review aggregator website Metacritic.
