= NHL Blades of Steel 2000 =

2000 video game

- Developers: Konami (PS); Climax Studios (GBC)
- Publisher: Konami
- Platforms: PlayStation, Game Boy Color
- Release: PlayStation: NA: February 22, 2000; UK: February 2000; JP: March 30, 2000; Game Boy Color: NA: April 21, 2000
- Genre: Sports
- Modes: Single-player, multiplayer

NHL Blades of Steel 2000 (Note: Japanese: NHL ブレイズ オブ スティール 2000, Hepburn: NHL Bureizu obu Sutīru 2000) is a set of two hockey video games published by Konami for PlayStation and Game Boy Color in 2000. A Nintendo 64 version had been planned (and was even reviewed by Game Informer while in development), but was later cancelled. NHL Blades of Steel 2000 is the third and last game in the Blades of Steel series following Blades of Steel for the NES and NHL Blades of Steel '99 for the Nintendo 64.

== Reception ==
Reception

Aggregate score
Aggregator	Score		
Aggregator	GBC	N64	PS
GameRankings	70%	N/A	39%

Review scores
Publication	Score		
Publication	GBC	N64	PS
AllGame	2/5	N/A	N/A
Famitsu	N/A	N/A	27/40
Game Informer	N/A	3.5/10	5.5/10
GameFan	N/A	N/A	59% (Note: In GameFan's early viewpoint of the PlayStation version, one critic gave it 58 and the other 60.)
GameSpot	N/A	N/A	3.2/10
IGN	7/10	N/A	2.5/10
Official U.S. PlayStation Magazine	N/A	N/A	2/5

The Game Boy Color version received average reviews, while the PlayStation version received unfavorable reviews, according to the review aggregation website GameRankings. Game Informer gave the latter console version a mixed review while it was still in development. In Japan, Famitsu gave it a score of 27 out of 40.
