= NHL Blades of Steel '99 =

1999 video game

- North American Nintendo 64 cover art, featuring Jaromír Jágr of Penguins
- Developers: Konami Computer Entertainment Osaka (N64); Climax Studios (GBC)
- Publisher: Konami
- Platforms: Nintendo 64, Game Boy Color
- Release: Nintendo 64: NA: April 5, 1999; EU: September 1999; Game Boy Color; July 6, 1999
- Genre: Sports
- Modes: Single player, multiplayer

NHL Blades of Steel '99, known as NHL Pro 99 in Europe, is an ice hockey game for Nintendo 64 and Game Boy Color (as NHL Blades of Steel). The N64 version has Controller Pak and Rumble Pak support. NHL Blades of Steel '99 is the second game in the Blades of Steel series following Blades of Steel for the NES and the first to be officially licensed by the National Hockey League. The third and last game in the series, NHL Blades of Steel 2000, was released for the PlayStation.

== Features ==
- All 27 NHL teams including the expansion Nashville Predators.
- Western and Eastern conference All-Star teams.
- Updated 98-99 team rosters.
- Create-a-player mode.
- Three game play modes: exhibition, season, and playoffs.
- Season and Playoff state tracking in more than 35 categories.
- Four player simultaneous multiplayer mode.

== Reception ==
Reception

Aggregate score
Aggregator	Score	
Aggregator	GBC	N64
GameRankings	59%	55%

Review scores
Publication	Score	
Publication	GBC	N64
AllGame	2/5	N/A
Electronic Gaming Monthly	N/A	5.125/10 (Note: In Electronic Gaming Monthly's review of the Nintendo 64 version, four critics gave it different scores: 4.5/10, 3.5/10, 6.5/10, and 6/10.)
Game Informer	7.5/10	6/10
GameFan	N/A	79% (Note: In GameFan's review of the Nintendo 64 version, one critic gave it 74, and the other 83.)
GamePro	N/A	3/5 (Note: GamePro gave the Nintendo 64 version two 3/5 scores for graphics and overall fun factor, 3.5/5 for sound, and 2.5/5 for control.)
IGN	7/10	5.1/10
Nintendo Power	5.9/10	6.3/10

The game received "mixed" reviews on both platforms according to the review aggregation website GameRankings. IGN said of the N64 version, "Konami's NHL Blades of Steel '99 title was plagued by terrible gameplay and horrible control and few nice touches didn't compensate for a disappointing and generally dull game." Nintendo Power gave the same console version a mixed review over a month before it was released stateside, while the same magazine gave the GBC version a mixed review over two months before it was released.
