= The Italian Job (2003 video game) =

- Developer: Climax Brighton
- Publisher: Eidos Interactive
- Producer: Nicolas Rodriguez
- Designer: Serkan Hassan
- Programmer: Balor Knight
- Artist: Vassos Shiarlis
- Platforms: PlayStation 2, Xbox, GameCube
- Release: NA: 24 June 2003 (PS2, Xbox); NA: 15 July 2003 (GCN); EU: 12 September 2003; AU: 19 September 2003
- Genre: Racing
- Modes: Single-player, multiplayer

The Italian Job (released in Europe and Australia as The Italian Job: L.A. Heist) is a racing video game released in 2003 developed by Climax Brighton and published by Eidos Interactive. The game is based on the 2003 film of the same name. The game features a story mode based on the movie and a multiplayer mode where the player drives Minis through several different circuits in Hollywood and LA. The Windows version was planned, but was cancelled.

== Gameplay ==
The Italian Job is a racing game based on the 2003 film. Players drive vehicles around Hollywood and Los Angeles, earning points for completing small tasks. There are 15 missions in the story mode. Each is designed to reflect a certain part of the movie, with the spoken introduction to each 'section' giving background on what part of the movie is being covered, and what the objective of the mission is going to be. The game's four other modes include racing around tracks, performing stunts for points, free roam, and time trials.

The game was developed to be in the same game style as the classic PlayStation Driver games because of the limitations they had during development having no licence for the actors of the movie.

== Reception ==
Reception

Aggregate score
Aggregator	Score
Metacritic	(GC) 56/100 (PS2) 55/100 (Xbox) 54/100

Review scores
Publication	Score
Edge	5/10
Electronic Gaming Monthly	14/30
Game Informer	5/10
GamePro	2.5/5
GameRevolution	C+
GameSpot	4.4/10
GameSpy	2/5
GameZone	(Xbox) 7.1/10 (PS2) 5/10
IGN	6.8/10
Nintendo Power	2.9/5
Official U.S. PlayStation Magazine	2/5
Official Xbox Magazine (US)	7.8/10
Maxim	5/10

The Italian Job received "mixed or average" reviews, according to review aggregator website Metacritic. Electronic Gaming Monthly's G. Ford was positive; although acknowledging that the game could be finished within a few days and offered nothing original, the easy and responsive controls, "neat stunts", "cool" story, and "impressive" visuals (particularly the cars and environments), made the experience worthwhile. The magazine's Greg S., however, panned the experience as a set of "boring, repetitive, and annoying missions", made worse by a useless radar system.

Maxim gave it a score of five out of ten and said, "The ordinary race-and-chaser’s loosely knit compilation of repetitive Mini Cooper showdowns has a recognizable scene or two, but that’s about it."
