= Ford vs. Chevy =

2005 video game

Ford Vs. Chevy
- North American PlayStation 2 box art
- Developer: Eutechnyx
- Publishers: Global Star Software, 2K Games
- Platforms: PlayStation 2, Xbox
- Release: NA: November 10, 2005; PAL: August 4, 2006 (PS2)
- Genre: Racing
- Modes: Single-player, multiplayer

Ford vs. Chevy is a racing video game published by 2K Games and developed by Eutechnyx. It was released on November 10, 2005, for the PlayStation 2 and Xbox. The video game is based on the two American automobile/truck brands.

== Plot ==
The Ford vs. Chevy rivalry began with characters Eddie Olson and Tyrone Baker, respectively racing a Ford Model T and a Chevrolet 490 in the earliest days of automobile racing. Other people started to join the party when the rivalry grew.

== Gameplay ==
=== Single-player ===
The player controls around 48 Ford and Chevrolet vehicles. The main game mode is the Westington Cup - here, all kinds of races are available. There are normal races, where the player races against three rival team members and two of their teammates. The player can choose to command their teammates to "Attack" or "Defend" so they can gain an advantage.

Other races include a 1/4 mile drag, as well as various missions involving such mechanics as smashing billboards or driving a journalist around to take photos.

=== Multiplayer ===
Ford vs. Chevy supports split screen. The game also supported up to 6 players online and also is playable through LAN on PlayStation 2 and System Link on Xbox.

== Reception ==
Ford vs. Chevy received average reviews according to video game review aggregator website Metacritic
