= ATV: Quad Power Racing =

2000 video game

- Developers: Climax Development; Tantalus Interactive (GBA)
- Publisher: Acclaim Entertainment (Note: Released under the Acclaim Sports label on the PlayStation, and the AKA Acclaim label on the Game Boy Advance)
- Platforms: PlayStation, Game Boy Advance
- Release: PlayStation: NA: August 29, 2000; EU: December 2, 2000; Game Boy Advance: NA: August 28, 2002; EU: December 6, 2002
- Genre: Racing
- Modes: Single-player, multiplayer

ATV: Quad Power Racing is a 2000 racing video game developed by Climax Development and published by Acclaim Entertainment under their Acclaim Sports banner for the PlayStation. A Game Boy Advance version was released two years later and developed by Tantalus Interactive, and was released under the AKA Acclaim banner.

A sequel, ATV: Quad Power Racing 2, was released in 2003 on sixth-generation consoles.

== Gameplay ==
There are four gameplay modes: championship, single race, time attack, and two-player. In championship mode there are six different playable characters to choose from and twelve tracks to race on. The tracks are separated to three different themes: desert, forest and snow. Objective is to win first place against five other computer-controlled opponents. In the time attack mode and the single race mode objective is to record a high score by time or place respectively. Two-player mode is a race between two human opponents in split screen. The game also features weather effects.

== Reception ==
=== Game Boy Advance ===
Reception

Aggregate score
Aggregator	Score
Metacritic	49/100

Review scores
Publication	Score
AllGame	2.5/5
Game Informer	6/10
GameSpot	5/10
GameZone	6.2/10
IGN	5.5/10
Gaming Age	C−
Nintendo Official Magazine	7/10
EAGB Advance	4/5

The Game Boy Advance version received mixed reviews from critics.

=== PlayStation ===
Reception

Aggregate score
Aggregator	Score
Metacritic	42/100

Review scores
Publication	Score
CNET Gamecenter	3/10
Electronic Gaming Monthly	6/10
Famitsu	21/40
Game Informer	6/10
GamePro	1.5/5
GameSpot	4.8/10
IGN	3/10
Official U.S. PlayStation Magazine	1/5

ATV: Quad Power Racing received "generally unfavorable reviews" on ps1 according to the review aggregation website Metacritic. GameSpot's Shane Satterfield wrote that for ATV enthusiasts the PlayStation version may warrant a rental but others who are only mildly into the sport will be disappointed by the game's repetitive graphics, steep learning curve, and overall lack of variety or fun. IGN also gave low marks on the same console version, noting its poor racing AI, among other game's issues. Game Vortex gave it a good review but said that the title will be appreciated by "hard-core" racers. In Japan, where the same PlayStation version was ported and published by Acclaim Japan on December 21, 2000, Famitsu gave it a score of 21 out of 40.
