= MotoGP: Ultimate Racing Technology 2 =

2003 video game

- Developers: Climax Brighton; Blue Beck (mobile)
- Publisher: THQ
- Platforms: Xbox, Microsoft Windows, mobile phone
- Release: EU: May 16, 2003 (Xbox); NA: May 21, 2003; EU: June 20, 2003 (PC); Mobile: NA: June 2, 2004
- Genre: Racing
- Modes: Single-player, multiplayer

MotoGP: Ultimate Racing Technology 2 is a Grand Prix motorcycle racing video game developed by Climax Brighton for the Xbox, Microsoft Windows, and mobile phones. It was the second title in THQ's MotoGP series and based on the 2002 Grand Prix motorcycle racing season.

== Gameplay ==
At the start of the game, players can take part in a single race on one of three circuits—Suzuka, Phakisa, Jerez–or participate in a full season, eventually unlocking more circuits to be raced on. Players could ride as most of the MotoGP riders from 2002, except for a couple of riders including Valentino Rossi, Max Biaggi and a few other riders. They are unlocked by achieving a specific number of points in Stunt Mode. Stunt mode is when the player races a one lap race performing different stunts as wheelies, burnouts and powerslides for points. Points are also rewarded when overtaking another rider, driving clean sections, or ramming other riders so they crash. However, recently gained points are lost if the player drives outside the track or crashes. Also if the player fails to reach goal within the timelimit, all rewarded points are lost. The menu theme music is Psynn 2 by Shawn Hargreaves, who created a new version of Psynn, version used in MotoGP.

The Xbox version supports online multiplayer via Xbox Live. While support for original Xbox games was terminated in 2010, MotoGP 2 is playable online on Insignia, a revival server for the Xbox restoring online functionality to games.

== Reception ==
Reception

Aggregate scores
Aggregator	Score		
Aggregator	mobile	PC	Xbox
GameRankings	83%	83%	87%
Metacritic	N/A	84/100	87/100

Review scores
Publication	Score		
Publication	mobile	PC	Xbox
Edge	N/A	N/A	8/10
Electronic Gaming Monthly	N/A	N/A	8.17/10
Eurogamer	N/A	N/A	8/10
Game Informer	N/A	N/A	8/10
GameSpot	8.3/10	7.7/10	8.9/10
GameSpy	N/A	N/A	4.5/5
IGN	8.3/10	8.4/10	8.8/10
Official Xbox Magazine (US)	N/A	N/A	8.5/10
PC Gamer (US)	N/A	88%	N/A
X-Play	N/A	N/A	3/5
BBC Sport	N/A	95%	95%

The Xbox and PC versions received "favorable" reviews according to the review aggregation website Metacritic. GameSpot named it the best Xbox game of June 2003.
