= Crash 'n' Burn (2004 video game) =

2004 racing video game

- North American cover art
- Developer: Climax Racing
- Publisher: Eidos Interactive
- Platforms: PlayStation 2, Xbox
- Release: NA: November 15, 2004; PAL: December 10, 2004
- Genres: Racing, vehicular combat
- Modes: Single-player, Multiplayer

Crash 'n' Burn is a racing video game developed by Climax Racing and published by Eidos Interactive in 2004. The game bears no relation to the 3DO title of the same name, despite being published by Eidos, who owned Crystal Dynamics, the developers of the 3DO game.

== Gameplay ==
In the game, the player races in fictional recreations of real-world locations in the United States, such as Miami, Las Vegas and San Francisco, against 16 AI opponents. A variety of game modes are available, most of which are unlocked through gaining experience from available events until reaching a specific experience level. The games modes are:

- Race - Players race around a circuit track across a set number of laps. The first player to cross the finish line wins.
- Team Race - Red and Blue teams are organized at random. Same as a regular race, but whichever team places higher overall collectively wins.
- Kamikaze Race - Same as a regular race, except that half of the cars go in one direction around the track, and the other half goes the opposite direction.
- Team Kamikaze - Same as Kamikaze race, with the scoring of a regular team race.
- Running Man - A player is selected at random to be the "running man". Points are gained by being the "running man", who in turn must evade opponents for as long as possible. A player can become the "running man" by simply tagging the current "running man".
- Last Man Standing - Players try to stay alive while wrecking as many opponents as possible. Points are gained by wrecking opponents, and a large bonus is awarded to the last player alive. The player with the most points wins.
- Team Last Man Standing - Red and Blue teams fight each other in the same fashion. The surviving team collectively wins.
- Bomb Tag - A player is selected at random to carry a bomb, which is continuously counting down. This player must get rid of the bomb by tagging an opponent, who becomes the new possessor of the bomb. Whoever holds the bomb when its timer hits 0 is instantly wrecked. The last player alive wins.
- Assassination - A player is selected at random to be highlighted for a short period of time. While highlighted, opponents gain points for attacking them and a large bonus for wrecking them. The last player alive gains a large bonus, but the player with the most points overall wins.

The player has 4 different car models to choose from: Compact, Pickup, Muscle and Sports. Compact cars and pickup trucks are available from the start, while muscle cars and sports cars must be unlocked. Each model has its own driving physics and unique selection of body parts, including spoilers, front and rear bumpers, and side skirts. Although all vehicles are fictional, certain combinations of parts can be used to resemble real world vehicles.

Almost every track featured in the game has static obstacles, such as slaloms, crossovers, and jumps. Also featured are "X" tracks, also known as high risk variation, which contain additional bumps and ramps. Dynamic obstacles will appear as races progress, such as oil and ignitable fuel slicks, as well as wreckage from totaled vehicles.

All vehicle customization is unlocked through the in game shop. Every event completed awards the player both experience (EXP) and money. Additional bonuses are awarded for wrecking opponents, setting fastest laps, placing in the top three, and leading laps. Earning EXP will eventually level the player up, which unlocks new items from the shop, which are purchased one at a time with money. At certain EXP levels, the player gains free bonuses and wrecking bonus, as well to access by unlocking muscle cars and sports cars.

== Development ==
The game was developed in 12 months.

== Reception ==
Reception

Aggregate score
Aggregator	Score	
Aggregator	PS2	Xbox
Metacritic	63/100	65/100

Review scores
Publication	Score	
Publication	PS2	Xbox
Edge	7/10	N/A
Eurogamer	7/10	N/A
Game Informer	7/10	7/10
GameRevolution	C+	C+
GameSpot	6.7/10	6.7/10
IGN	5.5/10	5.5/10
Official U.S. PlayStation Magazine	2/5	N/A
Official Xbox Magazine (US)	N/A	5.1/10
TeamXbox	N/A	7.8/10
X-Play	N/A	3/5
The Sydney Morning Herald	2.5/5	2.5/5

The game received "mixed or average" reviews on both platforms according to video game review aggregator website Metacritic.
