= Hot Wheels: Stunt Track Challenge =

2004 video game

- North American PS2 cover art featuring Ballistik and 24/Seven
- Developers: Climax Brighton (PS2/Xbox), Razorback Developments (GBA)
- Publisher: THQ
- Series: Hot Wheels
- Platforms: PlayStation 2 Game Boy Advance; Windows; Xbox
- Release: NA: November 9, 2004; PAL: November 26, 2004
- Genre: Racing
- Modes: Single-player, multiplayer

Hot Wheels: Stunt Track Challenge is a video game developed by Climax Brighton and published by THQ. It was released in November 2004 for PlayStation 2, Xbox, and Microsoft Windows. It is the ninth installment in the Hot Wheels series of video games. A Game Boy Advance port was developed by Razorback Developments, implementing many elements from the home console versions.

The game received mixed reviews from critics upon its release.

== Gameplay ==
Stunt Track Challenge is a racing-style arcade game that consists of drivers competing in stunt challenges and winning fast races to stay on the show. Sometimes, there are mini-games with special tasks, usually involving collecting icons in a limited amount of time.

The game also had an online mode, local co-op and compatibility with the Game Boy Advance Game Link Cable.

== Reception ==
Reception

Aggregate score
Aggregator	Score			
Aggregator	GBA	PC	PS2	Xbox
Metacritic	61/100	64/100	62/100	63/100

Review scores
Publication	Score			
Publication	GBA	PC	PS2	Xbox
Game Informer	N/A	N/A	6.75/10	6.75/10
GameSpot	N/A	N/A	5.9/10	5.9/10
GameZone	6.3/10	6.7/10	5.9/10	6/10
IGN	5.5/10	N/A	6.5/10	6.5/10
Nintendo Power	3.3/5	N/A	N/A	N/A
Official U.S. PlayStation Magazine	N/A	N/A	3.5/5	N/A
Official Xbox Magazine (UK)	N/A	N/A	N/A	5/10
TeamXbox	N/A	N/A	N/A	5.8/10

Hot Wheels: Stunt Track Challenge received "mixed" reviews on all platforms according to video game review aggregator website Metacritic.

Juan Castro of IGN gave the game 6.5 out of 10.

Alex Navarro of GameSpot gave Stunt Track Challenge 5.9 out of 10.

The game sold over 1.16 million copies worldwide, of which 700,000 in North America.
