= ATV Offroad Fury 4 =

2006 video game

- Developer: Climax Racing
- Publisher: Sony Computer Entertainment
- Artist: Trevor Moore
- Series: ATV Offroad Fury
- Platforms: PlayStation 2 PlayStation Portable
- Release: NA: October 31, 2006; AU: March 27, 2008; EU: March 28, 2008; PlayStation Portable: NA: October 26, 2006; EU: June 20, 2008; AU: June 26, 2008
- Genre: Racing
- Modes: Single-player, multiplayer

ATV Offroad Fury 4 is a racing video game developed by Climax Racing and published by Sony Computer Entertainment for the PlayStation 2. It was released on October 31, 2006 in North America, on March 27, 2008 in Australia, and one day later in Europe. An enhanced version for the PlayStation Portable titled ATV Offroad Fury Pro was also released in the same time, with the North American release occurring five days before the PlayStation 2 version. It is the last game in the ATV Offroad Fury series.

== Gameplay ==
ATV Offroad Fury 4 sees the introduction of new vehicles such as dirt bikes, trophy trucks and dune buggies, alongside existing quad bikes; this allows the game to include up to 50 Championship Modes. In addition to improved graphics, it also has an additional 60 tracks and improved online gaming.

In terms of in-game controls, more tricks are possible while the player is on an MX motorcycle, but none can be performed while the player is controlling a Trophy Truck or Dune Buggy. Similar to the risk of being thrown off an ATV or motorcycle during the game, Trophy Trucks and Dune Buggies are vulnerable to rollovers, after which the player's vehicle will be automatically reset back on its wheels, as it is when thrown off of an ATV or motorcycle. The game also offers tutorials on how to drive Trophy Trucks and Dune Buggies.

Similar to NASCAR Thunder 2004 is the introduction of rivals. All opponents have an icon above them; when a player hits an opponent, the opponent's icon will turn red and the opponent will be more aggressive towards the player.

The game has a "Story Mode" where players compete in events around the world and are required to complete a certain number of events to move on.

ATV Offroad Fury 4 includes more mini-games, such as "Ice Hockey" (introduced in ATV Offroad Fury 2), "Scavenger Hunt", "King Of The Hill", "Bowling", and "Ring of Fire".

The PlayStation Portable version uses the same physics engine and offers the same vehicles as 4, but features completely different race tracks, some exclusive vehicles, mini-games, and soundtrack. It features both ad hoc (local area network) or Infrastructure (web) multiplayer modes. This game also includes new vehicle classes known as snowmobiles and rally cars, which are exclusive to this version.

Eight "Classic" tracks can be unlocked by synchronizing save files with an ATV Offroad Fury Pro save via USB Link with a PlayStation Portable. These tracks appear in previous games in the series, and must be unlocked through Pro before unlocking them in 4.

== Reception ==
Reception

Aggregate score
Aggregator	Score
Metacritic	77/100

Review scores
Publication	Score
Eurogamer	8/10
Game Informer	7.5/10
GamePro	3/5
GameRevolution	B
GameSpot	8.1/10
GameSpy	4/5
GameTrailers	8.4/10
GameZone	7.7/10
IGN	8/10

ATV Offroad Fury 4 received "generally favorable" reviews, according to review aggregator website Metacritic.
