= List of Activision games: 2000–2009 =

The following List of Activision games: 2000–2009 is a portion of the List of Activision video games.

Title	Platform(s)	Release date	Developer(s)	Ref.
Vigilante 8: 2nd Offense	Dreamcast	February 8, 2000	Luxoflux	
Disney's Tarzan	Nintendo 64	February 14, 2000	Eurocom	
Tony Hawk's Pro Skater	Nintendo 64	March 15, 2000	Edge of Reality	
Star Trek: Armada	Microsoft Windows	March 22, 2000	Activision	
Alundra 2: A New Legend Begins	PlayStation	March 23, 2000	Matrix Software	
Soldier of Fortune	Microsoft Windows	March 29, 2000	Raven Software	
Tony Hawk's Pro Skater	Game Boy Color	March 30, 2000	Natsume Co., Ltd.	
Vampire: The Masquerade - Redemption	Microsoft Windows	June 7, 2000	Nihilistic Software	
Covert Ops: Nuclear Dawn	PlayStation	June 20, 2000	Sugar & Rockets	
Star Trek: ConQuest Online	Microsoft Windows	June 20, 2000	Genetic Anomalies	
Dark Reign 2	Microsoft Windows	June 27, 2000	Pandemic Studios	
Cyber Troopers Virtual On: Oratorio Tangram	Dreamcast	June 30, 2000	CSK Research Institute	
Toy Story 2: Buzz Lightyear to the Rescue!	Dreamcast	June 30, 2000	Traveller's Tales	
X-Men: Mutant Academy	PlayStation	July 6, 2000	Paradox Development	
X-Men: Mutant Academy	Game Boy Color	July 2000	Crawfish Interactive	
Tenchu 2: Birth of the Stealth Assassins	PlayStation	August 15, 2000	Acquire	
Star Trek: Invasion	PlayStation	August 22, 2000	Warthog	
Spider-Man	PlayStation	August 24, 2000	Neversoft	
Spider-Man	Game Boy Color	September 1, 2000	Vicarious Visions	
Tony Hawk's Pro Skater 2	PlayStation	September 19, 2000	Neversoft	
Star Trek: Voyager - Elite Force	Microsoft Windows	September 20, 2000	Raven Software	
Wizards & Warriors	Microsoft Windows	September 27, 2000	Heuristic Park	
Buzz Lightyear of Star Command	Dreamcast	October 3, 2000	Traveller's Tales	
Buzz Lightyear of Star Command	PlayStation	October 10, 2000	Traveller's Tales	
Call to Power II	Microsoft Windows	October 20, 2000	Activision	
Tony Hawk's Pro Skater 2	Microsoft Windows	October 24, 2000	LTI Gray Matter	
Orphen: Scion of Sorcery	PlayStation 2	October 26, 2000	Shade	
Tony Hawk's Pro Skater 2	Game Boy Color	November 6, 2000	Natsume Co., Ltd.	
Buzz Lightyear of Star Command	Game Boy Color	November 7, 2000	Traveller's Tales	
Tony Hawk's Pro Skater 2	Dreamcast	November 7, 2000	Treyarch	
X-Men: Mutant Wars	Game Boy Color	November 7, 2000	HAL / Avit	
Blade	Game Boy Color	November 14, 2000	HAL / Avit	
Sky Odyssey	PlayStation 2	November 14, 2000	Cross	
Spider-Man	Nintendo 64	November 20, 2000	Edge of Reality	
Disney's 102 Dalmatians: Puppies to the Rescue	Game Boy Color	November 21, 2000	Digital Eclipse	
Blade	PlayStation	November 24, 2000	HammerHead	
Star Wars: Demolition	Dreamcast	November 28, 2000	Luxoflux	
Walt Disney World Quest: Magical Racing Tour	Game Boy Color	December 5, 2000	Crystal Dynamics	
Road Champs: BXS Stunt Biking	Game Boy Color	December 10, 2000	HotGen	
The Lion King: Simba's Mighty Adventure	Game Boy Color	December 27, 2000	Torus Games	
Cabela's Grand Slam Hunting: North American 29	Microsoft Windows	2000	N-Fusion	
Weakest Link	PlayStation 2	January 10, 2001	Traveller's Tales	
The Lion King: Simba's Mighty Adventure	PlayStation	January 12, 2001	Paradox Development	
Toy Story Racer	Game Boy Color	March 6, 2001	Tiertex Design Studios	
Toy Story Racer	PlayStation	March 6, 2001	Traveller's Tales	
Star Trek: Away Team	Microsoft Windows	March 14, 2001	Reflexive Entertainment	
The Simpsons Wrestling	PlayStation	March 23, 2001	Big Ape Productions	
Tech Deck Skateboarding	Game Boy Color	March 26, 2001	Handheld Games	
Spider-Man	Dreamcast	April 20, 2001	Treyarch	
Mat Hoffman's Pro BMX	Game Boy Color	May 15, 2001	HotGen	
Mat Hoffman's Pro BMX	PlayStation	May 15, 2001	Runecraft / Shaba Games	
Spider-Man 2: The Sinister Six	Game Boy Color	May 15, 2001	Torus Games	
X-Men: Wolverine's Rage	Game Boy Color	May 15, 2001	Digital Eclipse	
Commander Keen	Game Boy Color	May 17, 2001	David A. Palmer Productions / Id Software	
World's Scariest Police Chases	PlayStation	May 21, 2001	Unique Development Studios	
Pinobee: Wings of Adventure	Game Boy Advance	May 31, 2001	Artoon	
Tony Hawk's Pro Skater 2	Game Boy Advance	June 11, 2001	Vicarious Visions	
Tomb Raider: Curse of the Sword	Game Boy Color	June 25, 2001	Core Design	
Bloody Roar 3	PlayStation 2	June 26, 2001	Eighting	
Bomberman Tournament	Game Boy Advance	June 29, 2001	Hudson Soft	
The House of the Dead 2	Microsoft Windows	July 6, 2001	Sega	
Tony Hawk's Pro Skater 2	Nintendo 64	August 22, 2001	Edge of Reality	
Stuart Little: The Journey Home	Game Boy Color	September 4, 2001	Tiertex Design Studios	
Mat Hoffman's Pro BMX	Dreamcast	September 12, 2001	Runecraft	
Spider-Man	Microsoft Windows	September 19, 2001	LTI Gray Matter	
Spider-Man: Mysterio's Menace	Game Boy Advance	September 20, 2001	Vicarious Visions	
X-Men: Mutant Academy 2	PlayStation	September 20, 2001	Paradox Development	
Supercar Street Challenge	Microsoft Windows	September 25, 2001	Exakt Entertainment	
Supercar Street Challenge	PlayStation 2	September 25, 2001	Exakt Entertainment	
Weakest Link	Microsoft Windows	September 25, 2001	Traveller's Tales	
X-Men: Reign of Apocalypse	Game Boy Advance	September 26, 2001	Digital Eclipse	
Mat Hoffman's Pro BMX	Microsoft Windows	September 28, 2001	LTI Gray Matter	
Weakest Link	PlayStation	September 28, 2001	Traveller's Tales	
Spider-Man 2: Enter: Electro	PlayStation	October 18, 2001	Vicarious Visions	
Doom	Game Boy Advance	October 26, 2001	David A. Palmer Productions	
Tony Hawk's Pro Skater 3	PlayStation	October 30, 2001	Shaba Games	
Tony Hawk's Pro Skater 3	PlayStation 2	October 30, 2001	Neversoft	
Alienators: Evolution Continues	Game Boy Advance	November 7, 2001	Digital Eclipse	
Jackie Chan Adventures: Legend of the Dark Hand	Game Boy Advance	November 7, 2001	Torus Games	
Tony Hawk's Pro Skater 2x	Xbox	November 12, 2001	Treyarch	
Mat Hoffman's Pro BMX	Game Boy Advance	November 14, 2001	HotGen	
Tony Hawk's Pro Skater 3	Game Boy Color	November 14, 2001	HotGen	
Star Trek: Armada II	Microsoft Windows	November 16, 2001	Mad Doc Software	
Tony Hawk's Pro Skater 3	GameCube	November 18, 2001	Neversoft	
Return to Castle Wolfenstein	Microsoft Windows	November 19, 2001	Gray Matter Studios / Nerve Software	
Shaun Palmer's Pro Snowboarder	Game Boy Color	November 2001	ITL	
Shaun Palmer's Pro Snowboarder	PlayStation 2	November 2001	Dear Soft	
Shaun Palmer's Pro Snowboarder	Game Boy Advance	December 4, 2001	Natsume Co., Ltd.	
Wreckless: The Yakuza Missions	Xbox	February 6, 2002	Bunkasha Games	
Star Trek: Bridge Commander	Microsoft Windows	February 26, 2002	Totally Games	
Tony Hawk's Pro Skater 3	Game Boy Advance	March 5, 2002	Vicarious Visions	
Tony Hawk's Pro Skater 3	Xbox	March 5, 2002	Neversoft	
Bloody Roar: Primal Fury	GameCube	March 19, 2002	Eighting	
Space Invaders	Game Boy Advance	March 19, 2002	Torus Games	
Tony Hawk's Pro Skater 3	Microsoft Windows	March 28, 2002	Gearbox Software	
Spider-Man	Game Boy Advance	April 16, 2002	Digital Eclipse	
Spider-Man	GameCube	April 16, 2002	Treyarch	
Spider-Man	Microsoft Windows	April 16, 2002	LTI Gray Matter	
Spider-Man	PlayStation 2	April 16, 2002	Treyarch	
Spider-Man	Xbox	April 16, 2002	Treyarch	
Soldier of Fortune II: Double Helix	Microsoft Windows	May 21, 2002	Raven Software	
Lost Kingdoms	GameCube	May 28, 2002	FromSoftware	
XXX	Game Boy Advance	August 9, 2002	Digital Eclipse	
Mat Hoffman's Pro BMX 2	Game Boy Advance	August 13, 2002	HotGen	
Mat Hoffman's Pro BMX 2	PlayStation 2	August 13, 2002	Rainbow Studios	
Mat Hoffman's Pro BMX 2	Xbox	August 13, 2002	Rainbow Studios	
Street Hoops	PlayStation 2	August 13, 2002	Black Ops Entertainment	
Street Hoops	Xbox	August 13, 2002	Black Ops Entertainment	
Medieval: Total War	Microsoft Windows	August 20, 2002	The Creative Assembly	
Tony Hawk's Pro Skater 3	Nintendo 64	August 20, 2002	Edge of Reality	
Blade II	PlayStation 2	September 3, 2002	Mucky Foot Productions	
Blade II	Xbox	September 3, 2002	Mucky Foot Productions	
Kelly Slater's Pro Surfer	Game Boy Advance	September 17, 2002	HotGen	
Kelly Slater's Pro Surfer	GameCube	September 17, 2002	Treyarch	
Kelly Slater's Pro Surfer	PlayStation 2	September 17, 2002	Treyarch	
Kelly Slater's Pro Surfer	Xbox	September 17, 2002	Treyarch	
Mat Hoffman's Pro BMX 2	GameCube	October 8, 2002	Gratuitous Games	
X-Men: Next Dimension	GameCube	October 15, 2002	Exakt Entertainment	
X-Men: Next Dimension	PlayStation 2	October 15, 2002	Paradox Development	
Doom II	Game Boy Advance	October 23, 2002	Torus Games	
Tony Hawk's Pro Skater 4	GameCube	October 23, 2002	Neversoft	
Tony Hawk's Pro Skater 4	PlayStation	October 23, 2002	Vicarious Visions	
Tony Hawk's Pro Skater 4	PlayStation 2	October 23, 2002	Neversoft	
Tony Hawk's Pro Skater 4	Xbox	October 23, 2002	Neversoft	
Tony Hawk's Pro Skater 4	Game Boy Advance	October 29, 2002	Vicarious Visions	
X-Men: Next Dimension	Xbox	October 29, 2002	Paradox Development	
Disney's Tarzan: Return to the Jungle	Game Boy Advance	October 31, 2002	Digital Eclipse	
Star Trek: Starfleet Command III	Microsoft Windows	November 7, 2002	Taldren	
Rally Fusion: Race of Champions	PlayStation 2	November 12, 2002	Climax Studios	
Rally Fusion: Race of Champions	Xbox	November 12, 2002	Climax Studios	
Wreckless: The Yakuza Missions	GameCube	November 12, 2002	Broadsword Interactive	
Wreckless: The Yakuza Missions	PlayStation 2	November 12, 2002	Broadsword Interactive	
Minority Report: Everybody Runs	GameCube	November 19, 2002	Treyarch	
Minority Report: Everybody Runs	PlayStation 2	November 19, 2002	Treyarch	
Minority Report: Everybody Runs	Xbox	November 19, 2002	Treyarch	
Street Hoops	GameCube	November 26, 2002	Black Ops Entertainment	
The Invincible Iron Man	Game Boy Advance	December 10, 2002	Torus Games	
Minority Report: Everybody Runs	Game Boy Advance	December 11, 2002	Torus Games	
Gods and Generals	Microsoft Windows	March 1, 2003	Anivision Value	
Tenchu: Wrath of Heaven	PlayStation 2	March 4, 2003	K2	
X2: Wolverine's Revenge	Game Boy Advance	April 15, 2003	Vicarious Visions	
X2: Wolverine's Revenge	GameCube	April 15, 2003	GenePool Software	
X2: Wolverine's Revenge	Microsoft Windows	April 15, 2003	LTI Gray Matter	
X2: Wolverine's Revenge	PlayStation 2	April 15, 2003	GenePool Software	
Medieval: Total War - Viking Invasion	Microsoft Windows	May 6, 2003	The Creative Assembly	
Return to Castle Wolfenstein: Tides of War	Xbox	May 6, 2003	Gray Matter Studios / Threewave Software	
Day of Defeat	Microsoft Windows	May 6, 2003	Valve	
Lost Kingdoms II	GameCube	May 13, 2003	FromSoftware	
Return to Castle Wolfenstein: Operation Resurrection	PlayStation 2	May 27, 2003	Gray Matter Studios / Threewave Software	
Wolfenstein: Enemy Territory	Linux	May 28, 2003	Splash Damage	
Wolfenstein: Enemy Territory	Microsoft Windows	May 28, 2003	Splash Damage	
Wakeboarding Unleashed Featuring Shaun Murray	PlayStation 2	June 3, 2003	Shaba Games	
Wakeboarding Unleashed Featuring Shaun Murray	Xbox	June 3, 2003	Shaba Games	
Star Trek: Elite Force II	Microsoft Windows	June 24, 2003	Ritual Entertainment	
Soldier of Fortune II: Double Helix	Xbox	July 17, 2003	Gratuitous Games	
Disney's Extreme Skate Adventure	Game Boy Advance	September 3, 2003	Vicarious Visions	
Disney's Extreme Skate Adventure	GameCube	September 3, 2003	Toys for Bob	
Disney's Extreme Skate Adventure	PlayStation 2	September 3, 2003	Toys for Bob	
Disney's Extreme Skate Adventure	Xbox	September 3, 2003	Toys for Bob	
Star Wars: Jedi Knight - Jedi Academy	Microsoft Windows	September 16, 2003	Raven Software / Threewave Software	
Tony Hawk's Pro Skater	N-Gage	October 13, 2003	Ideaworks	
Empires: Dawn of the Modern World	Microsoft Windows	October 21, 2003	Stainless Steel Studios	
Tony Hawk's Underground	Game Boy Advance	October 28, 2003	Vicarious Visions	
Tony Hawk's Underground	GameCube	October 28, 2003	Neversoft	
Tony Hawk's Underground	PlayStation 2	October 28, 2003	Neversoft	
Tony Hawk's Underground	Xbox	October 28, 2003	Neversoft	
Call of Duty	Microsoft Windows	October 29, 2003	Infinity Ward	
True Crime: Streets of LA	GameCube	November 4, 2003	Luxoflux	
True Crime: Streets of LA	PlayStation 2	November 4, 2003	Luxoflux	
True Crime: Streets of LA	Xbox	November 4, 2003	Luxoflux	
Pitfall: The Lost Expedition	GameCube	February 18, 2004	Edge of Reality	
Pitfall: The Lost Expedition	PlayStation 2	February 18, 2004	Edge of Reality	
Pitfall: The Lost Expedition	Xbox	February 18, 2004	Edge of Reality	
Pitfall: The Lost Expedition	Game Boy Advance	February 20, 2004	Torus Games	
MTX Mototrax	PlayStation 2	March 3, 2004	Left Field Productions / Shaba Games	
MTX Mototrax	Xbox	March 3, 2004	Left Field Productions / Shaba Games	
Tenchu: Return from Darkness	Xbox	March 9, 2004	Prosoft	
Shrek 2	GameCube	May 4, 2004	Luxoflux	
Shrek 2	Microsoft Windows	May 4, 2004	KnowWonder	
Shrek 2	PlayStation 2	May 4, 2004	Luxoflux	
Shrek 2	Xbox	May 4, 2004	Luxoflux	
True Crime: Streets of LA	Microsoft Windows	May 14, 2004	LTI Gray Matter	
Spider-Man 2	Microsoft Windows	June 28, 2004	The Fizz Factor	
Spider-Man 2	GameCube	June 29, 2004	Treyarch	
Spider-Man 2	PlayStation 2	June 29, 2004	Treyarch	
Spider-Man 2	Xbox	June 29, 2004	Treyarch	
Doom 3	Microsoft Windows	August 3, 2004	Id Software / Splash Damage	
Call of Duty: United Offensive	Microsoft Windows	September 14, 2004	Gray Matter Studios / Pi Studios	
X-Men: Legends	GameCube	September 21, 2004	Raven Software	
X-Men: Legends	PlayStation 2	September 21, 2004	Raven Software	
X-Men: Legends	Xbox	September 21, 2004	Raven Software	
Rome: Total War	Microsoft Windows	September 22, 2004	The Creative Assembly	
Shark Tale	GameCube	September 27, 2004	Edge of Reality	
Shark Tale	PlayStation 2	September 27, 2004	Edge of Reality	
Shark Tale	Xbox	September 27, 2004	Edge of Reality	
Shark Tale	Microsoft Windows	September 28, 2004	KnowWonder	
Shark Tale	Game Boy Advance	September 2004	Vicarious Visions	
Tony Hawk's Underground 2	Game Boy Advance	October 4, 2004	Vicarious Visions	
Tony Hawk's Underground 2	GameCube	October 4, 2004	Neversoft	
Tony Hawk's Underground 2	Microsoft Windows	October 4, 2004	Beenox	
Tony Hawk's Underground 2	PlayStation 2	October 4, 2004	Neversoft	
Tony Hawk's Underground 2	Xbox	October 4, 2004	Neversoft	
Shrek 2: Beg for Mercy!	Game Boy Advance	October 26, 2004	Vicarious Visions	
Shrek 2: Team Action	Microsoft Windows	November 3, 2004	Beenox	
Lemony Snicket's A Series of Unfortunate Events	GameCube	November 9, 2004	Adrenium Games	
Lemony Snicket's A Series of Unfortunate Events	Microsoft Windows	November 9, 2004	KnowWonder	
Lemony Snicket's A Series of Unfortunate Events	PlayStation 2	November 9, 2004	Adrenium Games	
Lemony Snicket's A Series of Unfortunate Events	Xbox	November 9, 2004	Adrenium Games	
Lemony Snicket's A Series of Unfortunate Events	Game Boy Advance	November 10, 2004	Griptonite	
Cabela's Big Game Hunter: 2005 Adventures	Game Boy Advance	November 11, 2004	Torus Games	
Call of Duty: Finest Hour	GameCube	November 16, 2004	Exakt Entertainment	
Call of Duty: Finest Hour	PlayStation 2	November 16, 2004	Spark Unlimited / Kuju Surrey	
Call of Duty: Finest Hour	Xbox	November 16, 2004	Spark Unlimited / Kuju Surrey	
Spider-Man 2	Nintendo DS	November 16, 2004	Vicarious Visions	
Vampire: The Masquerade - Bloodlines	Microsoft Windows	November 18, 2004	Troika Games	
Spider-Man & Friends	Microsoft Windows	November 18, 2004		
Spider-Man 2	Game Boy Advance	2004	Digital Eclipse	
Spider-Man 2	N-Gage	2004	Backbone Entertainment / Digital Eclipse	
X-Men: Legends	N-Gage	February 7, 2005	Barking Lizards Technologies	
Star Wars: Republic Commando	Microsoft Windows	March 1, 2005	LucasArts	
Star Wars: Republic Commando	Xbox	March 1, 2005	LucasArts	
Tony Hawk's Underground 2: Remix	PlayStation Portable	March 15, 2005	Shaba Games	
Wolfenstein: Enemy Territory	Macintosh	March 22, 2005	Aspyr	
Spider-Man 2	PlayStation Portable	March 24, 2005	Vicarious Visions / Driver-Inter	
Doom 3	Xbox	April 5, 2005	Vicarious Visions	
Madagascar	Game Boy Advance	May 23, 2005	Vicarious Visions	
Madagascar	PlayStation 2	May 23, 2005	Toys for Bob	
Madagascar	Xbox	May 23, 2005	Toys for Bob	
Madagascar	GameCube	May 24, 2005	Toys for Bob	
Madagascar	Microsoft Windows	May 24, 2005	Beenox	
Madagascar	Nintendo DS	May 24, 2005	Vicarious Visions	
Fantastic Four	Game Boy Advance	June 28, 2005	Torus Games	
Fantastic Four	GameCube	June 28, 2005	7 Studios	
Fantastic Four	Microsoft Windows	June 28, 2005	Beenox	
Fantastic Four	PlayStation 2	June 28, 2005	7 Studios	
Fantastic Four	Xbox	June 28, 2005	7 Studios	
World Series of Poker	Xbox	August 31, 2005	Left Field Productions	
World Series of Poker	PlayStation 2	September 8, 2005	Left Field Productions	
World Series of Poker	PlayStation Portable	September 8, 2005	Left Field Productions	
Cabela's Outdoor Adventures	GameCube	September 13, 2005	Magic Wand Productions	
Cabela's Outdoor Adventures	PlayStation 2	September 13, 2005	Sand Grain Studios	
Cabela's Outdoor Adventures	Xbox	September 14, 2005	Fun Labs	
World Series of Poker	GameCube	September 14, 2005	Left Field Productions	
X-Men: Legends II - Rise of Apocalypse	GameCube	September 21, 2005	Raven Software / SuperVillain Studios	
X-Men: Legends II - Rise of Apocalypse	Microsoft Windows	September 21, 2005	Beenox	
X-Men: Legends II - Rise of Apocalypse	PlayStation 2	September 21, 2005	Raven Software / SuperVillain Studios	
X-Men: Legends II - Rise of Apocalypse	Xbox	September 21, 2005	Raven Software / SuperVillain Studios	
Ultimate Spider-Man	Game Boy Advance	September 22, 2005	Vicarious Visions	
Ultimate Spider-Man	GameCube	September 22, 2005	Treyarch	
Ultimate Spider-Man	Microsoft Windows	September 22, 2005	Beenox	
Ultimate Spider-Man	Nintendo DS	September 22, 2005	Vicarious Visions	
Ultimate Spider-Man	PlayStation 2	September 22, 2005	Treyarch	
Ultimate Spider-Man	Xbox	September 22, 2005	Treyarch	
World Series of Poker	Microsoft Windows	September 2005	Left Field Productions	
Ty the Tasmanian Tiger 3: Night of the Quinkan	GameCube	October 11, 2005	Krome Studios	
Ty the Tasmanian Tiger 3: Night of the Quinkan	PlayStation 2	October 11, 2005	Krome Studios	
Ty the Tasmanian Tiger 3: Night of the Quinkan	Xbox	October 11, 2005	Krome Studios	
Tony Hawk's American Sk8land	Game Boy Advance	October 15, 2005	Vicarious Visions	
Tony Hawk's American Sk8land	Nintendo DS	October 15, 2005	Vicarious Visions	
Greg Hastings' Tournament Paintball Max'd	Xbox	October 18, 2005	WXP	
Quake 4	Microsoft Windows	October 18, 2005	Raven Software / Id Software	
Tony Hawk's American Wasteland	GameCube	October 18, 2005	Neversoft	
Tony Hawk's American Wasteland	PlayStation 2	October 18, 2005	Neversoft	
Tony Hawk's American Wasteland	Xbox	October 18, 2005	Neversoft	
X-Men: Legends II - Rise of Apocalypse	PlayStation Portable	October 18, 2005	Raven Software / SuperVillain Studios	
Call of Duty 2	Microsoft Windows	October 25, 2005	Infinity Ward / Pi Studios	
Shrek SuperSlam	Game Boy Advance	October 25, 2005	Amaze Entertainment	
Shrek SuperSlam	GameCube	October 25, 2005	Shaba Games	
Shrek SuperSlam	Nintendo DS	October 25, 2005	Amaze Entertainment	
Shrek SuperSlam	PlayStation 2	October 25, 2005	Shaba Games	
Shrek SuperSlam	Xbox	October 25, 2005	Shaba Games	
X-Men: Legends II - Rise of Apocalypse	N-Gage	October 31, 2005	Barking Lizards Technologies	
Call of Duty 2: Big Red One	GameCube	November 1, 2005	Treyarch / High Voltage Software	
Call of Duty 2: Big Red One	PlayStation 2	November 1, 2005	Treyarch / High Voltage Software	
Call of Duty 2: Big Red One	Xbox	November 1, 2005	Treyarch / High Voltage Software	
Shamu's Deep Sea Adventures	PlayStation 2	November 1, 2005	Sand Grain Studios	
Shamu's Deep Sea Adventures	Xbox	November 1, 2005	Sand Grain Studios	
Shrek SuperSlam	Microsoft Windows	November 1, 2005	LTI Gray Matter	
Madagascar: Operation Penguin	Game Boy Advance	November 7, 2005	Vicarious Visions	
Fantastic 4: Flame On	Game Boy Advance	November 8, 2005	Torus Games	
Gun	GameCube	November 8, 2005	Neversoft / Shaba Games	
Gun	Microsoft Windows	November 8, 2005	Beenox	
Gun	PlayStation 2	November 8, 2005	Neversoft / Shaba Games	
Gun	Xbox	November 8, 2005	SuperVillain Studios	
Shamu's Deep Sea Adventures	Game Boy Advance	November 8, 2005	Humagade	
Shamu's Deep Sea Adventures	GameCube	November 8, 2005	Sand Grain Studios	
Shamu's Deep Sea Adventures	Nintendo DS	November 8, 2005	Humagade	
The Movies	Microsoft Windows	November 8, 2005	Lionhead Studios	
Tony Hawk's American Wasteland	Xbox 360	November 14, 2005	Neversoft / Shaba Games / SuperVillain Studios	
True Crime: New York City	GameCube	November 16, 2005	Exakt Entertainment	
True Crime: New York City	PlayStation 2	November 16, 2005	Luxoflux / Z-Axis	
True Crime: New York City	Xbox	November 16, 2005	Exakt Entertainment	
Gun	Xbox 360	November 17, 2005	Neversoft / Shaba Games	
Call of Duty 2	Xbox 360	November 22, 2005	Infinity Ward / Pi Studios	
Quake 4	Xbox 360	November 22, 2005	Raven Software / Id Software	
Tony Hawk's Underground	Microsoft Windows	2005	Beenox	
Tony Hawk's American Wasteland	Microsoft Windows	February 6, 2006	Neversoft	
Cabela's Outdoor Adventures	Microsoft Windows	March 7, 2006	Magic Wand Productions	
Over the Hedge	Nintendo DS	May 5, 2006	Vicarious Visions	
Over the Hedge	GameCube	May 9, 2006	Edge of Reality	
Over the Hedge	Microsoft Windows	May 9, 2006	Beenox	
Over the Hedge	PlayStation 2	May 9, 2006	Edge of Reality	
Over the Hedge	Xbox	May 9, 2006	Edge of Reality	
X-Men: The Official Game	Game Boy Advance	May 16, 2006	WayForward Technologies	
X-Men: The Official Game	GameCube	May 16, 2006	Hypnos Entertainment	
X-Men: The Official Game	Microsoft Windows	May 16, 2006	Beenox	
X-Men: The Official Game	Nintendo DS	May 16, 2006	Amaze Entertainment	
X-Men: The Official Game	PlayStation 2	May 16, 2006	Z-Axis	
X-Men: The Official Game	Xbox	May 16, 2006	Z-Axis	
X-Men: The Official Game	Xbox 360	May 16, 2006	Z-Axis	
Greg Hastings' Tournament Paintball Max'd	Nintendo DS	May 17, 2006	Nightlight Studios	
Over the Hedge	Game Boy Advance	May 2006	Vicarious Visions	
The Movies: Stunts & Effects	Microsoft Windows	June 6, 2006	Lionhead Studios	
MTX Mototrax	PlayStation Portable	June 26, 2006	Left Field Productions	
The Ultimate Doom	Xbox Live Arcade	September 27, 2006	Nerve Software	
Greg Hastings' Tournament Paintball Max'd	PlayStation 2	September 2006	WXP	
Gun: Showdown	PlayStation Portable	October 10, 2006	Rebellion Developments	
Marvel Ultimate Alliance	Game Boy Advance	October 24, 2006	Barking Lizards Technologies	
Marvel Ultimate Alliance	Microsoft Windows	October 24, 2006	Beenox	
Marvel Ultimate Alliance	PlayStation 2	October 24, 2006	Raven Software	
Marvel Ultimate Alliance	PlayStation Portable	October 24, 2006	Vicarious Visions	
Marvel Ultimate Alliance	Xbox	October 24, 2006	Raven Software	
Marvel Ultimate Alliance	Xbox 360	October 24, 2006	Raven Software	
Tony Hawk's Downhill Jam	Nintendo DS	October 24, 2006	Vicarious Visions	
Bakugan: Defenders of the Core	Nintendo DS	October 26, 2006	Now Production	
The Barbie Diaries: High School Mystery	Microsoft Windows	October 30, 2006	Super-Ego Games	
Over the Hedge: Hammy Goes Nuts!	Nintendo DS	October 31, 2006	Amaze Entertainment	
Barbie in The 12 Dancing Princesses	Game Boy Advance	October 2006	WayForward Technologies	
Over the Hedge: Hammy Goes Nuts!	Game Boy Advance	October 2006	Vicarious Visions	
Call of Duty 3	PlayStation 2	November 7, 2006	Treyarch / Pi Studios	
Call of Duty 3	Xbox	November 7, 2006	Treyarch / Pi Studios	
Call of Duty 3	Xbox 360	November 7, 2006	Treyarch / Pi Studios	
Guitar Hero II	PlayStation 2	November 7, 2006	Harmonix	
Tony Hawk's Project 8	PlayStation 2	November 7, 2006	Shaba Games	
Tony Hawk's Project 8	Xbox	November 7, 2006	Shaba Games	
Tony Hawk's Project 8	Xbox 360	November 7, 2006	Neversoft	
Barbie in The 12 Dancing Princesses	Microsoft Windows	November 14, 2006	Blue Monkey Studios	
Call of Duty 3	PlayStation 3	November 14, 2006	Treyarch / Pi Studios	
Shrek Smash N' Crash Racing	PlayStation 2	November 14, 2006	Torus Games	
Marvel Ultimate Alliance	PlayStation 3	November 17, 2006	Raven Software	
Tony Hawk's Downhill Jam	Wii	November 19, 2006	Toys for Bob	
Tony Hawk's Project 8	PlayStation 3	November 17, 2006	Neversoft	
Call of Duty 3	Wii	November 19, 2006	Exakt Entertainment	
Marvel Ultimate Alliance	Wii	November 19, 2006	Vicarious Visions	
MTV Pimp My Ride	Xbox 360	November 21, 2006	Eutechnyx	
Over the Hedge: Hammy Goes Nuts!	PlayStation Portable	November 21, 2006	Amaze Entertainment	
Tony Hawk's Project 8	PlayStation Portable	November 21, 2006	Page 44 Studios	
Rapala: Tournament Fishing	Wii	November 22, 2006	Magic Wand Productions	
Harley-Davidson: Race to the Rally	PlayStation Portable	November 27, 2006	Sand Grain Studios	
Harley-Davidson: Race to the Rally	Microsoft Windows	November 28, 2006	Fun Labs	
Shrek Smash N' Crash Racing	GameCube	November 28, 2006	Torus Games	
Barbie in The 12 Dancing Princesses	PlayStation 2	November 29, 2006	Blue Monkey Studios	
Barbie in The 12 Dancing Princesses	Nintendo DS	November 2006	WayForward Technologies	
MTV Pimp My Ride	PlayStation 2	November 2006	Eutechnyx	
Shrek Smash N' Crash Racing	PlayStation Portable	December 1, 2006	Torus Games	
Rapala Pro Fishing	PlayStation Portable	2006	Sand Grain Studios	
The Barbie Diaries: High School Mystery	Game Boy Advance	2006	Gorilla Systems / NeoPong Software	
Call of Duty: Roads to Victory	PlayStation Portable	March 13, 2007	Amaze Entertainment	
Shrek Smash N' Crash Racing	Nintendo DS	March 17, 2007	Torus Games	
Guitar Hero II	Xbox 360	April 3, 2007	Harmonix	
Spider-Man 3	Game Boy Advance	May 3, 2007	Vicarious Visions	
Spider-Man 3	Microsoft Windows	May 4, 2007	Beenox	
Spider-Man 3	Nintendo DS	May 4, 2007	Vicarious Visions	
Spider-Man 3	PlayStation 2	May 4, 2007	Vicarious Visions	
Spider-Man 3	PlayStation 3	May 4, 2007	Treyarch	
Spider-Man 3	Wii	May 4, 2007	Vicarious Visions	
Spider-Man 3	Xbox 360	May 4, 2007	Treyarch	
Shrek the Third	Nintendo DS	May 8, 2007	Vicarious Visions	
Tony Hawk's Downhill Jam	PlayStation 2	May 8, 2007	SuperVillain Studios	
Shrek the Third	Game Boy Advance	May 15, 2007	Vicarious Visions	
Shrek the Third	Microsoft Windows	May 15, 2007	Amaze Entertainment / 7 Studios / Shaba Games	
Shrek the Third	PlayStation 2	May 15, 2007	Amaze Entertainment / Shaba Games	
Shrek the Third	PlayStation Portable	May 15, 2007	Amaze Entertainment	
Shrek the Third	Wii	May 15, 2007	Amaze Entertainment / Shaba Games	
Shrek the Third	Xbox 360	May 15, 2007	Amaze Entertainment / 7 Studios / Shaba Games	
Transformers: Autobots	Nintendo DS	June 19, 2007	Vicarious Visions	
Transformers: Decepticons	Nintendo DS	June 19, 2007	Vicarious Visions	
Transformers: The Game	Microsoft Windows	June 26, 2007	Traveller's Tales	
Transformers: The Game	PlayStation 2	June 26, 2007	Traveller's Tales	
Transformers: The Game	PlayStation 3	June 26, 2007	Traveller's Tales	
Transformers: The Game	Wii	June 26, 2007	Traveller's Tales	
Transformers: The Game	Xbox 360	June 26, 2007	Traveller's Tales	
Guitar Hero Encore: Rocks the 80s	PlayStation 2	July 24, 2007	Harmonix	
Puppy Luv: Spa and Resort	Game Boy Advance	September 11, 2007	Humagade	
Jewel Quest Expeditions	Nintendo DS	September 13, 2007	Mistic Software	
Puppy Luv: Spa and Resort	Nintendo DS	September 23, 2007	Humagade	
Hot Wheels: Beat That!	Microsoft Windows	September 25, 2007	Eutechnyx	
Hot Wheels: Beat That!	PlayStation 2	September 25, 2007	Eutechnyx	
Hot Wheels: Beat That!	Wii	September 25, 2007	Eutechnyx	
Hot Wheels: Beat That!	Xbox 360	September 25, 2007	Eutechnyx	
Enemy Territory: Quake Wars	Microsoft Windows	October 2, 2007	Splash Damage / Nerve Software	
Spider-Man: Friend or Foe	Microsoft Windows	October 2, 2007	Beenox	
Spider-Man: Friend or Foe	PlayStation 2	October 2, 2007	Next Level Games	
Spider-Man: Friend or Foe	Wii	October 2, 2007	Next Level Games	
Spider-Man: Friend or Foe	Xbox 360	October 2, 2007	Next Level Games	
Mahjong Quest: Expeditions	Nintendo DS	October 16, 2007	GameBrains	
Spider-Man 3	PlayStation Portable	October 16, 2007	Vicarious Visions	
Tony Hawk's Proving Ground	Nintendo DS	October 16, 2007	Vicarious Visions	
Tony Hawk's Proving Ground	PlayStation 2	October 16, 2007	Page 44 Studios	
Tony Hawk's Proving Ground	PlayStation 3	October 16, 2007	Neversoft	
Tony Hawk's Proving Ground	Wii	October 16, 2007	Page 44 Studios	
Tony Hawk's Proving Ground	Xbox 360	October 16, 2007	Neversoft	
Bee Movie Game	Microsoft Windows	October 22, 2007	Beenox	
Bee Movie Game	Nintendo DS	October 22, 2007	Vicarious Visions	
Bee Movie Game	PlayStation 2	October 22, 2007	Beenox	
Bee Movie Game	Wii	October 22, 2007	Smart Bomb Interactive	
Bee Movie Game	Xbox 360	October 22, 2007	Beenox	
Dancing With the Stars	Wii	October 23, 2007	Zoë Mode	
Guitar Hero III: Legends of Rock	PlayStation 2	October 28, 2007	Budcat Creations	
Guitar Hero III: Legends of Rock	PlayStation 3	October 28, 2007	Neversoft	
Guitar Hero III: Legends of Rock	Wii	October 28, 2007	Vicarious Visions	
Guitar Hero III: Legends of Rock	Xbox 360	October 28, 2007	Neversoft	
Barbie as the Island Princess	PlayStation 2	October 30, 2007	Ivolgamus	
Barbie as the Island Princess	Wii	October 30, 2007	Ivolgamus	
Shrek: Ogres and Dronkeys	Nintendo DS	October 30, 2007	WayForward Technologies	
Barbie as the Island Princess	Microsoft Windows	October 31, 2007	Ivolgamus	
Barbie as the Island Princess	Nintendo DS	October 31, 2007	Human Soft	
Dancing With the Stars	PlayStation 2	October 31, 2007	Zoë Mode	
Spanish for Everyone!	Nintendo DS	October 2007	Humagade	
Call of Duty 4: Modern Warfare	Microsoft Windows	November 5, 2007	Infinity Ward	
Call of Duty 4: Modern Warfare	Nintendo DS	November 5, 2007	N-Space	
Call of Duty 4: Modern Warfare	PlayStation 3	November 5, 2007	Infinity Ward / Demonware	
Call of Duty 4: Modern Warfare	Xbox 360	November 5, 2007	Infinity Ward / Demonware	
Cabela's Big Game Hunter	PlayStation 2	November 6, 2007	Sand Grain Studios	
Cabela's Big Game Hunter	Xbox 360	November 8, 2007	Fun Labs	
Hot Wheels: Beat That!	Nintendo DS	November 8, 2007	Human Soft	
Guitar Hero III: Legends of Rock	Microsoft Windows	November 13, 2007	Aspyr	
Soldier of Fortune: Payback	Microsoft Windows	November 13, 2007	Cauldron	
Soldier of Fortune: Payback	Xbox 360	November 13, 2007	Cauldron	
Shrek-N-Roll	Xbox Live Arcade	November 14, 2007	Backbone Entertainment	
Soldier of Fortune: Payback	PlayStation 3	November 20, 2007	Cauldron	
Cabela's Big Game Hunter	Wii	2007	Sand Grain Studios	
Barbie as the Island Princess	Game Boy Advance	2007	Human Soft	
Puppy Luv: Your New Best Friend	Nintendo DS	February 1, 2008	GameMill Entertainment	
MTV Pimp My Ride	Wii	February 19, 2008	Eutechnyx	
Enemy Territory: Quake Wars	PlayStation 3	May 27, 2008	Underground Development	
Enemy Territory: Quake Wars	Xbox 360	May 27, 2008	Nerve Software	
Kung Fu Panda	Microsoft Windows	June 3, 2008	Beenox	
Kung Fu Panda	Nintendo DS	June 3, 2008	Vicarious Visions	
Kung Fu Panda	PlayStation 2	June 3, 2008	XPEC Entertainment / Luxoflux	
Kung Fu Panda	PlayStation 3	June 3, 2008	Luxoflux / XPEC Entertainment	
Kung Fu Panda	Wii	June 3, 2008	XPEC Entertainment / Luxoflux	
Kung Fu Panda	Xbox 360	June 3, 2008	Luxoflux / XPEC Entertainment	
Guitar Hero: On Tour	Nintendo DS	June 22, 2008	Vicarious Visions	
Guitar Hero: Aerosmith	PlayStation 2	June 29, 2008	Budcat Creations	
Guitar Hero: Aerosmith	PlayStation 3	June 29, 2008	Neversoft	
Guitar Hero: Aerosmith	Wii	June 29, 2008	Vicarious Visions	
Guitar Hero: Aerosmith	Xbox 360	June 29, 2008	Neversoft	
Golf: Tee It Up!	Xbox Live Arcade	July 9, 2008	Housemarque	
Geometry Wars: Retro Evolved 2	Xbox Live Arcade	July 30, 2008	Bizarre Creations	
Rapala's Fishing Frenzy	Wii	September 2, 2008	Magic Wand Productions	
Cabela's Legendary Adventures	PlayStation 2	September 9, 2008	Fun Labs	
Cabela's Legendary Adventures	PlayStation Portable	September 9, 2008	Sand Grain Studios	
Cabela's Legendary Adventures	Wii	September 9, 2008	Fun Labs	
Barbie Fashion Show: An Eye for Style	Microsoft Windows	September 23, 2008	CyberPlanet Interactive	
Barbie Fashion Show: An Eye for Style	Nintendo DS	September 23, 2008	CyberPlanet Interactive	
Cabela's Dangerous Hunts 2009	PlayStation 2	September 23, 2008	Sand Grain Studios	
Cabela's Dangerous Hunts 2009	PlayStation 3	September 23, 2008	Sand Grain Studios	
Cabela's Dangerous Hunts 2009	Wii	September 23, 2008	Fun Labs	
Cabela's Dangerous Hunts 2009	Xbox 360	September 23, 2008	Fun Labs	
Pitfall: The Lost Expedition	Wii	September 23, 2008	Edge of Reality	
Crash: Mind over Mutant	Nintendo DS	October 7, 2008	Tose	
Rapala's Fishing Frenzy	Xbox 360	October 17, 2008	Sand Grain Studios	
Barbie Horse Adventures: Riding Camp	Nintendo DS	October 21, 2008	Farmind	
Barbie Horse Adventures: Riding Camp	Wii	October 21, 2008	Pixel Tales	
Dancing with the Stars: We Dance!	Nintendo DS	October 21, 2008	Jet Black Games	
Dancing with the Stars: We Dance!	Wii	October 21, 2008	Jet Black Games	
Guitar Hero: Aerosmith	Macintosh	October 21, 2008	Neversoft	
Guitar Hero: Aerosmith	Microsoft Windows	October 21, 2008	Neversoft	
Spider-Man: Web of Shadows	Microsoft Windows	October 21, 2008	Aspyr	
Spider-Man: Web of Shadows	Nintendo DS	October 21, 2008	Griptonite	
Spider-Man: Web of Shadows	PlayStation 3	October 21, 2008	Shaba Games / Treyarch	
Spider-Man: Web of Shadows	Wii	October 21, 2008	Treyarch / Shaba Games	
Spider-Man: Web of Shadows	Xbox 360	October 21, 2008	Shaba Games / Treyarch	
Spider-Man: Web of Shadows - Amazing Allies Edition	PlayStation 2	October 21, 2008	Amaze Entertainment	
Spider-Man: Web of Shadows - Amazing Allies Edition	PlayStation Portable	October 21, 2008	Amaze Entertainment	
Transformers Animated: The Game	Nintendo DS	October 21, 2008	Artificial Mind & Movement	
Guitar Hero: World Tour	PlayStation 2	October 26, 2008	Budcat Creations	
Guitar Hero: World Tour	PlayStation 3	October 26, 2008	Neversoft	
Guitar Hero: World Tour	Wii	October 26, 2008	Vicarious Visions	
Guitar Hero: World Tour	Xbox 360	October 26, 2008	Neversoft	
Monster Jam: Urban Assault	Wii	October 28, 2008	Torus Games	
Pirates: Hunt for Blackbeard's Booty	Wii	October 28, 2008	Mad Monkey Studio	
Score International Baja 1000	PlayStation 2	October 28, 2008	Left Field Productions	
Score International Baja 1000	PlayStation 3	October 28, 2008	Left Field Productions	
Score International Baja 1000	Wii	October 28, 2008	Left Field Productions	
Score International Baja 1000	Xbox 360	October 28, 2008	Left Field Productions	
Shrek's Carnival Craze Party Games	Microsoft Windows	October 28, 2008	Ivolgamus	
Shrek's Carnival Craze Party Games	Nintendo DS	October 28, 2008	Ivolgamus	
Shrek's Carnival Craze Party Games	PlayStation 2	October 28, 2008	Ivolgamus	
Shrek's Carnival Craze Party Games	Wii	October 28, 2008	Ivolgamus	
Score International Baja 1000	Microsoft Windows	October 2008	Left Field Productions	
007: Quantum of Solace	Microsoft Windows	November 4, 2008	Beenox	
007: Quantum of Solace	Nintendo DS	November 4, 2008	Vicarious Visions	
007: Quantum of Solace	PlayStation 2	November 4, 2008	Eurocom	
007: Quantum of Solace	PlayStation 3	November 4, 2008	Treyarch / Nerve Software	
007: Quantum of Solace	Wii	November 4, 2008	Beenox	
007: Quantum of Solace	Xbox 360	November 4, 2008	Treyarch / Nerve Software	
Kung Fu Panda: Legendary Warriors	Nintendo DS	November 4, 2008	Artificial Mind & Movement	
Kung Fu Panda: Legendary Warriors	Wii	November 4, 2008	Artificial Mind & Movement	
Madagascar: Escape 2 Africa	Microsoft Windows	November 4, 2008	Aspyr	
Madagascar: Escape 2 Africa	Nintendo DS	November 4, 2008	Griptonite	
Madagascar: Escape 2 Africa	PlayStation 2	November 4, 2008	Toys for Bob / Underground Development	
Madagascar: Escape 2 Africa	PlayStation 3	November 4, 2008	Toys for Bob / Underground Development	
Madagascar: Escape 2 Africa	Wii	November 4, 2008	Toys for Bob / Underground Development	
Madagascar: Escape 2 Africa	Xbox 360	November 4, 2008	Toys for Bob / Underground Development	
Vigilante 8: Arcade	Xbox Live Arcade	November 5, 2008	Isopod Labs	
Big League Sports	Wii	November 11, 2008	Koolhaus Games	
Call of Duty: World at War	Microsoft Windows	November 11, 2008	Treyarch / Arkane Studios / Certain Affinity / Pi Studios / Spov	
Call of Duty: World at War	PlayStation 3	November 11, 2008	Treyarch / Arkane Studios / Certain Affinity / Pi Studios / Spov	
Call of Duty: World at War	Wii	November 11, 2008	Exakt Entertainment	
Call of Duty: World at War	Xbox 360	November 11, 2008	Treyarch / Arkane Studios / Certain Affinity / Pi Studios / Spov	
Call of Duty: World at War - Final Fronts	PlayStation 2	November 11, 2008	Rebellion Developments	
Block Party	Wii	November 12, 2008	Ivolgamus	
Call of Duty: World at War	Nintendo DS	November 14, 2008	N-Space	
Guitar Hero: On Tour - Decades	Nintendo DS	November 16, 2008	Vicarious Visions	
Monkey Mischief!: Party Time	Wii	November 18, 2008	Ivolgamus	
NPPL Championship Paintball 2009	PlayStation 2	November 18, 2008	Fun Labs	
NPPL Championship Paintball 2009	PlayStation 3	November 18, 2008	Fun Labs	
NPPL Championship Paintball 2009	Wii	November 18, 2008	Fun Labs	
NPPL Championship Paintball 2009	Xbox 360	November 18, 2008	Fun Labs	
Barbie Horse Adventures: Riding Camp	Microsoft Windows	November 20, 2008	Pixel Tales	
Barbie Horse Adventures: Riding Camp	PlayStation 2	November 20, 2008	Pixel Tales	
Rapala's Fishing Frenzy	PlayStation 3	November 21, 2008	Sand Grain Studios	
Mystery Case Files: Return to Ravenhearst	Microsoft Windows	February 11, 2009	Big Fish Games	
Animal Planet: Emergency Vets	Nintendo DS	March 10, 2009	SilverBirch Studios	
Monster Jam: Urban Assault	PlayStation 2	March 12, 2009	Torus Games	
Monster Jam: Urban Assault	PlayStation Portable	March 12, 2009	Torus Games	
Monsters vs. Aliens	Microsoft Windows	March 24, 2009	Beenox	
Monsters vs. Aliens	Nintendo DS	March 24, 2009	Griptonite	
Monsters vs. Aliens	PlayStation 2	March 24, 2009	Beenox	
Monsters vs. Aliens	PlayStation 3	March 24, 2009	Beenox	
Monsters vs. Aliens	Wii	March 24, 2009	Beenox	
Monsters vs. Aliens	Xbox 360	March 24, 2009	Beenox	
Pimp My Ride: Street Racing	Nintendo DS	March 24, 2009	Virtuos	
Guitar Hero: Metallica	PlayStation 2	March 29, 2009	Budcat Creations	
Guitar Hero: Metallica	PlayStation 3	March 29, 2009	Neversoft	
Guitar Hero: Metallica	Wii	March 29, 2009	Budcat Creations	
Guitar Hero: Metallica	Xbox 360	March 29, 2009	Neversoft	
Mixed Messages	Nintendo DSi	April 13, 2009	Vicarious Visions	
X-Men Origins: Wolverine	Nintendo DS	May 1, 2009	Griptonite	
X-Men Origins: Wolverine	PlayStation 2	May 1, 2009	Amaze Entertainment	
X-Men Origins: Wolverine	PlayStation Portable	May 1, 2009	Griptonite	
X-Men Origins: Wolverine	Wii	May 1, 2009	Amaze Entertainment	
X-Men Origins: Wolverine - Uncaged Edition	Microsoft Windows	May 1, 2009	Raven Software	
X-Men Origins: Wolverine - Uncaged Edition	PlayStation 3	May 1, 2009	Raven Software	
X-Men Origins: Wolverine - Uncaged Edition	Xbox 360	May 1, 2009	Raven Software	
Space Camp	Nintendo DS	May 26, 2009	7 Studios	
Space Camp	Wii	May 26, 2009	7 Studios	
Wolfenstein 3D	PlayStation 3	June 3, 2009	Nerve Software	
Wolfenstein 3D	Xbox Live Arcade	June 3, 2009	Nerve Software	
Guitar Hero: On Tour - Modern Hits	Nintendo DS	June 9, 2009	Vicarious Visions	
Prototype	Microsoft Windows	June 9, 2009	Radical Entertainment	
Prototype	PlayStation 3	June 9, 2009	Radical Entertainment	
Prototype	Xbox 360	June 9, 2009	Radical Entertainment	
Big League Sports: Summer Sports	Nintendo DS	June 15, 2009	Koolhaus Games	
Little League World Series Baseball 2009	Wii	June 15, 2009	Now Production	
Guitar Hero Smash Hits	PlayStation 2	June 16, 2009	Beenox	
Guitar Hero Smash Hits	PlayStation 3	June 16, 2009	Beenox	
Guitar Hero Smash Hits	Wii	June 16, 2009	Beenox	
Guitar Hero Smash Hits	Xbox 360	June 16, 2009	Beenox	
Little League World Series Baseball 2009	Nintendo DS	June 23, 2009	Black Lantern Studios	
Transformers: Revenge of the Fallen	PlayStation 2	June 23, 2009	Krome Studios	
Transformers: Revenge of the Fallen	PlayStation 3	June 23, 2009	Luxoflux / 7 Studios / Spov	
Transformers: Revenge of the Fallen	Wii	June 23, 2009	Krome Studios	
Transformers: Revenge of the Fallen	Xbox 360	June 23, 2009	Luxoflux / 7 Studios / Spov	
Transformers: Revenge of the Fallen - Autobots	Nintendo DS	June 23, 2009	Vicarious Visions	
Transformers: Revenge of the Fallen - Decepticons	Nintendo DS	June 23, 2009	Vicarious Visions	
Ice Age: Dawn of the Dinosaurs	Microsoft Windows	June 30, 2009	Eurocom	
Ice Age: Dawn of the Dinosaurs	Nintendo DS	June 30, 2009	Artificial Mind & Movement	
Ice Age: Dawn of the Dinosaurs	PlayStation 2	June 30, 2009	Eurocom	
Ice Age: Dawn of the Dinosaurs	PlayStation 3	June 30, 2009	Eurocom	
Ice Age: Dawn of the Dinosaurs	Wii	June 30, 2009	Eurocom	
Ice Age: Dawn of the Dinosaurs	Xbox 360	June 30, 2009	Eurocom	
Guitar Hero: World Tour	Macintosh	July 15, 2009	Aspyr	
Guitar Hero: World Tour	Microsoft Windows	July 15, 2009	Aspyr	
Science Papa	Nintendo DS	July 21, 2009	Mad Monkey Studio	
Science Papa	Wii	July 21, 2009	Mad Monkey Studio	
Transformers: Revenge of the Fallen	Microsoft Windows	July 23, 2009	Beenox	
Wolfenstein	Microsoft Windows	August 18, 2009	Raven Software / Endrant Studios / Pi Studios / Threewave Software / Underground Development	
Wolfenstein	PlayStation 3	August 18, 2009	Raven Software / Endrant Studios / Pi Studios / Threewave Software / Underground Development	
Wolfenstein	Xbox 360	August 18, 2009	Raven Software / Endrant Studios / Pi Studios / Threewave Software / Underground Development	
Guitar Hero 5	PlayStation 2	September 1, 2009	Budcat Creations	
Guitar Hero 5	PlayStation 3	September 1, 2009	Budcat Creations	
Guitar Hero 5	Wii	September 1, 2009	Budcat Creations	
Guitar Hero 5	Xbox 360	September 1, 2009	Budcat Creations	
Arcade Zone	Wii	September 8, 2009	Ivolgamus	
Cabela's Outdoor Adventures	PlayStation 2	September 8, 2009	Fun Labs	
Cabela's Outdoor Adventures	PlayStation 3	September 8, 2009	Fun Labs	
Cabela's Outdoor Adventures	Wii	September 8, 2009	Fun Labs	
Cabela's Outdoor Adventures	Xbox 360	September 8, 2009	Fun Labs	
Marvel Ultimate Alliance 2	Nintendo DS	September 15, 2009	N-Space	
Marvel Ultimate Alliance 2	PlayStation 2	September 15, 2009	N-Space	
Marvel Ultimate Alliance 2	PlayStation 3	September 15, 2009	Vicarious Visions	
Marvel Ultimate Alliance 2	Wii	September 15, 2009	N-Space	
Marvel Ultimate Alliance 2	Xbox 360	September 15, 2009	Vicarious Visions	
Animal Planet: Vet Life	Nintendo DS	September 22, 2009	Big Blue Bubble	
Animal Planet: Vet Life	Wii	September 22, 2009	Big Blue Bubble	
Marvel Ultimate Alliance 2	PlayStation Portable	September 22, 2009	Savage Entertainment	
Cabela's Big Game Hunter 2010	PlayStation 3	September 29, 2009	Cauldron	
Cabela's Big Game Hunter 2010	Wii	September 29, 2009	Cauldron	
Cabela's Big Game Hunter 2010	Xbox 360	September 29, 2009	Cauldron	
Rapala: We Fish	Wii	September 29, 2009	Polygon Magic	
Cabela's Outdoor Adventures	Microsoft Windows	October 13, 2009	Fun Labs	
Barbie and the Three Musketeers	Microsoft Windows	October 27, 2009	WayForward Technologies	
DJ Hero	PlayStation 2	October 27, 2009	FreeStyleGames	
DJ Hero	PlayStation 3	October 27, 2009	FreeStyleGames	
DJ Hero	Wii	October 27, 2009	FreeStyleGames	
DJ Hero	Xbox 360	October 27, 2009	FreeStyleGames	
iCarly	Nintendo DS	October 27, 2009	Human Soft	
iCarly	Wii	October 27, 2009	Blitz Games	
Madagascar: Kartz	Nintendo DS	October 27, 2009	Virtuos	
Madagascar: Kartz	PlayStation 3	October 27, 2009	Sidhe Interactive	
Madagascar: Kartz	Wii	October 27, 2009	Sidhe Interactive	
Madagascar: Kartz	Xbox 360	October 27, 2009	Sidhe Interactive	
Band Hero	Nintendo DS	November 3, 2009	Vicarious Visions	
Band Hero	PlayStation 2	November 3, 2009	Budcat Creations	
Band Hero	PlayStation 3	November 3, 2009	Neversoft	
Band Hero	Wii	November 3, 2009	Vicarious Visions	
Band Hero	Xbox 360	November 3, 2009	Neversoft	
Barbie and the Three Musketeers	Nintendo DS	November 3, 2009	WayForward Technologies	
Barbie and the Three Musketeers	Wii	November 3, 2009	WayForward Technologies	
Jurassic: The Hunted	PlayStation 2	November 3, 2009	Cauldron	
Jurassic: The Hunted	PlayStation 3	November 3, 2009	Cauldron	
Jurassic: The Hunted	Wii	November 3, 2009	Cauldron	
Jurassic: The Hunted	Xbox 360	November 3, 2009	Cauldron	
Call of Duty: Modern Warfare	Wii	November 10, 2009	Treyarch	
Call of Duty: Modern Warfare 2	Microsoft Windows	November 10, 2009	Infinity Ward	
Call of Duty: Modern Warfare 2	PlayStation 3	November 10, 2009	Infinity Ward	
Call of Duty: Modern Warfare 2	Xbox 360	November 10, 2009	Infinity Ward	
Call of Duty: Modern Warfare - Mobilized	Nintendo DS	November 10, 2009	N-Space	
Call of Duty: World at War - Zombies	iOS	November 16, 2009	Ideaworks	
Chaotic: Shadow Warriors	Microsoft Windows	November 17, 2009	Sand Grain Studios	
Chaotic: Shadow Warriors	Nintendo DS	November 17, 2009	Sand Grain Studios	
Chaotic: Shadow Warriors	PlayStation 3	November 17, 2009	Sand Grain Studios	
Chaotic: Shadow Warriors	Xbox 360	November 17, 2009	Sand Grain Studios	
Hot Wheels: Battle Force 5	Nintendo DS	November 17, 2009	Virtuos	
Hot Wheels: Battle Force 5	Wii	November 17, 2009	Sidhe Interactive	
Tony Hawk: Ride	PlayStation 3	November 17, 2009	Robomodo	
Tony Hawk: Ride	Wii	November 17, 2009	Buzz Monkey Software	
Tony Hawk: Ride	Xbox 360	November 17, 2009	Robomodo	
Guitar Hero: Van Halen	PlayStation 2	December 22, 2009	Budcat Creations	
Guitar Hero: Van Halen	PlayStation 3	December 22, 2009	Underground Development	
Guitar Hero: Van Halen	Wii	December 22, 2009	Underground Development	
Guitar Hero: Van Halen	Xbox 360	December 22, 2009	Underground Development	
