= Greg Hastings' Tournament Paintball =

2004 video game

- Developer(s): The Whole Experience
- Publisher(s): Activision
- Platform(s): Xbox
- Release: NA: November 16, 2004; EU: March 24, 2005
- Genre(s): First-person shooter, sports
- Mode(s): Multiplayer

Greg Hastings' Tournament Paintball is a 2004 first-person paintball game released exclusively for the Xbox. The game gathered a cult following, consistently appearing on the Xbox Live Top 25 list posted by Major Nelson, peaking at the number nine position. In line with other online-enabled games on the Xbox, multiplayer was available via Xbox Live to players until April 15, 2010. Greg Hastings' Tournament Paintball is now playable online again on the replacement Xbox Live servers called Insignia. A spin-off, Greg Hastings Tournament Paintball MAX'D, was also released on multiple platforms many months later, with a full sequel released in 2010 for the Wii, PlayStation 3 and Xbox 360.

== Features ==
- 3 game types to play: Elimination, Capture the Flag, Center Flag
- Cheat Meter: try to wipe paint without getting caught
- Switch marker hands from left to right
- 14 top pro paintball players
- 25 real-life paintball sponsors to provide an authentic experience
- Real-life paintball fields and tournament locations

=== Single-player ===
- 19 tournaments to play
- 98 different field layouts
- Play against up to 80 different opponent teams, including 69 real life teams
- Advance from rookie to novice to amateur to pro
- Gain experience points and increase the skills

=== Multiplayer ===
- Xbox Live and System Link enabled
- Communicate on the field with the use of XboxT voice communicator
- Play online with up to 7-on-7 team play
- 20 unique locations to play
- 179 different field layouts

== Reception ==
Tournament Paintball was a runner-up for GameSpot's 2004 "Most Surprisingly Good Game" award, which went to The Chronicles of Riddick: Escape from Butcher Bay. The game sold 200,000 units.
