= Lists of Activision video games =

This is a list of video games published or developed by Activision, a subsidiary of Activision Blizzard.

== Lists ==
- List of Activision games: 1980–1999
- List of Activision games: 2000–2009
- List of Activision games: 2010–2019
- List of Activision games: 2020–present
- List of Activision Value games
