= Over the Hedge (video game) =

2006 video game

- Developers: Edge of Reality; Beenox (PC); Vicarious Visions (GBA)
- Publisher: Activision
- Programmer: Jacob Meakin
- Artist: William M. Sullivan
- Engine: Torque
- Platforms: Game Boy Advance; GameCube; Microsoft Windows; PlayStation 2; Xbox
- Release: NA: May 9, 2006; EU: June 8, 2006; AU: June 14, 2006
- Genre: Platform
- Modes: Single-player, multiplayer

Over the Hedge is a platform video game published by Activision and based on the film of the same name. The game was released on May 9, 2006 on Microsoft Windows and the PlayStation 2, Xbox, GameCube, and Game Boy Advance platforms, alongside a separate handheld version for the Nintendo DS. Sami Kirkpatrick, Madison Davenport, and Shane Baumel reprise their roles from the film as the baby porcupines Bucky, Quillo, and Spike.

== Story ==
In the video game, which takes place a year after the first movie (like a sequel), RJ, Hammy, Verne, and the gang feel that they need to have more things for the log (the area behind the hedge). This leads them on a wild romp through six different areas to snatch different things such as a popcorn machine and a TV for themselves. There are several mini games as bonuses in the game.

All through the game, they try to take these things while avoiding the Sniffer (Dwayne the Verminator), who tries to defeat them by using mind-controlled vermin he has captured as his "henchmen". At one point, many animals, including weasels, badgers and even Vincent the bear (who later helps them when he redeems himself), are controlled.

== Gameplay ==
Over the Hedge features 3D platform gameplay as well as mini games. Players navigate a series of homes searching for luxury items, controlling RJ, Verne, Hammy or Stella. Character voices are provided by soundalikes rather than the original actors who recorded the voices for the film (except Bucky, Spike and Quillo).

Two different kinds of attacks can be employed, melee and ranged. Your arsenal includes golf clubs, sticks, baseball bats, plungers and other various items to use as improvised weapons. Ranged attacks consist of throwing boomerangs, frisbees and shooting golf balls, and these attacks can be charged up. There are also energy attacks, projectile weapons and objects to pick up and throw at enemies. The game has several pickup weapons, such as weapons that only opponents have (i.e., a trowel). There are also guns that can be picked up, such as a toy ball launcher, a freeze ray, a bubble shooter, or a lava blaster.

Players can jump or double jump. The game allows a second player to press a button on the second controller and join the game at any time, as well as pause the game and drop out. There are also plenty of obstacles and hazards to overcome, as well as objectives to complete and extras to collect. The game also has an array of hats, which when collected make a humorous sound and act as armor. These include a chef hat, a crown, a witch hat and a hockey helmet amongst others.

Several locations from the movie (and some that are not) appear to give a greater playing ground than the suburbs, the home base being the woods where all the loot is stored. Players can switch around between the four characters to give the storyline some slight twist, as each character says something different when a situation arises, to slightly alter the story, exempt of the first 4 levels, which resume the end of the film.

== Reception ==
Reception

Aggregate scores
Aggregator	Score				
Aggregator	GBA	GameCube	PC	PS2	Xbox
GameRankings	49.54%	66.39%	68.80%	62.85%	65.59%
Metacritic	49/100	61/100	65/100	58/100	61/100

Review scores
Publication	Score				
Publication	GBA	GameCube	PC	PS2	Xbox
Eurogamer	N/A	6/10	6/10	6/10	6/10
GameRevolution	N/A	N/A	D	N/A	N/A
GameSpot	5.4/10	5.6/10	5.6/10	5.6/10	5.6/10
GamesRadar+	N/A	2/5	2/5	2/5	2/5
GameZone	N/A	N/A	N/A	6.8/10	N/A
IGN	N/A	6.5/10	N/A	6.5/10	6.5/10
Nintendo World Report	N/A	6/10	N/A	N/A	N/A

Over the Hedge was met with mixed reception, the consoles and PC versions was met with "mixed or average" reviews, while the Game Boy Advance version was met with "generally unfavorable" reviews, according to review aggregator Metacritic. GameSpot gave the PC and console versions a 5.6 out of 10 saying, "A few unique touches are overshadowed by crushingly dull gameplay in this perfunctory animated movie tie-in.", while they gave the Game Boy Advance version a 5.4 out of 10, writing, "Over the Hedge on the GBA is a simple puzzle game best suited for very young children." IGN gave the console versions a 6.5 out of 10, saying, "A turtle with a hockey stick. How can that not be fun?"

Despite the mixed reception, the Academy of Interactive Arts & Sciences nominated Over the Hedge for "Children's Game of the Year" at the 10th Annual Interactive Achievement Awards.
