= Soldier of Fortune II: Double Helix =

2002 video game

- Developer: Raven Software (Note: Xbox version developed by Gratuitous Games)
- Publishers: Activision; MacPlay (OS X)
- Director: Jon Zuk
- Designer: Matt Pinkston
- Programmer: Dan Kramer
- Artist: Joe Koberstein
- Composer: Zachary Quarles
- Engine: id Tech 3
- Platforms: Microsoft Windows, OS X, Xbox
- Release: Microsoft Windows: NA: May 21, 2002; EU: May 31, 2002; OS X: WW: September 3, 2002; Xbox: EU: June 20, 2003; NA: June 24, 2003; AU: July 3, 2003
- Genre: First-person shooter
- Modes: Single-player, multiplayer

Soldier of Fortune II: Double Helix is a 2002 first-person shooter video game developed by Raven Software, the sequel to Soldier of Fortune. It was developed using the id Tech 3 engine as opposed to the original's id Tech 2. Once again, Raven hired John Mullins to act as a consultant on the game. Based on criticisms of the original game, Raven Software developed Soldier of Fortune II to be a more "realistic" game, with more modern tactical shooters like Operation Flashpoint: Cold War Crisis (2001) and Tom Clancy's Rainbow Six (1998) serving as inspirations, rather than Quake (1996).

Like the first game in the series, Double Helix pushed the boundaries of depictions of gore and violence, and is considered more graphic and realistic than most in the first-person genre. This time around, the theme was germ warfare rather than nuclear terrorism. The multiplayer mode had five different gametypes, and playing through the single-player story, a player could choose from four different levels of difficulty.

An unrelated sequel titled Soldier of Fortune: Payback, made by Cauldron HQ, was released for Microsoft Windows, PlayStation 3 and Xbox 360 in 2007.

== Story ==
The theme of the Double Helix is germ warfare, as the mercenary Mullins and his new partner Madeline Taylor travel to Colombia to investigate a viral outbreak in a small town, only to link it to a shadowy organization called Prometheus. The virus, called Romulus, is followed by a computer virus called Remus which is programmed to delete files on any computer in the world, in this case, files relating to Prometheus and Romulus, so an anti-virus cannot be formulated. Prometheus then plans to blackmail the G8 countries at a summit in Switzerland for billions of dollars. It is revealed throughout the course of the game that a mole inside The Shop may be feeding information to the terrorists.

== Gameplay ==
Soldier of Fortune II is a shooter game played from the first-person perspective. In the campaign, the player must complete a series of levels that encompass Soldier of Fortune II's storyline, reprising their role as special operative John Mullins from the first installment. Its campaign can be experienced through four levels of difficulty: Amateur, Gun for Hire, Consultant, and Soldier of Fortune. Alternatively, players can select the Random Missions Generator to create levels with unique parameters. Following the gameplay formula of its predecessor, Soldier of Fortune II primarily revolves around run and gun tactics, but also includes segments focused on stealth and vehicular combat. The status of Mullins' health is indicated by the heads-up display (HUD). Health packs and armor can be found at different parts of the game or on downed enemies, allowing the player to sustain more damage.

Gunfights are a major mechanic of Soldier of Fortune II. As players progress through the story, they earn access to various new weapons and equipment, some dropped by downed enemies; these include several different rifles, machine guns, shotguns, sniper rifles, handguns, and explosives. Players may also customize most of their weapons with special firearm modifications. Such modifications alter the rate of fire or add attachments like silencers, bayonets, and grenade launchers. Mullins carries a toolkit and can use it to interact with the environment—disabling trip wires, picking locks, and cutting power lines among other actions.

=== Multiplayer ===
In multiplayer mode, there are five gametypes: Capture the Flag, Infiltration, Team Deathmatch, Deathmatch and Elimination. The Gold Edition of the game adds an extra gametype: Demolition, bringing the number of gametypes in the game to six. In line with other online-enabled games on the Xbox, multiplayer on Xbox Live was available to players until April 15, 2010. Soldier of Fortune II is now playable online again on the replacement Xbox Live servers called Insignia.

- In Capture the Flag, all players are divided into two teams: a red team and a blue team. The objective is for one team to get the flag of the other team, located in the enemies base, and bring it back to their own base. Once a team hits the number of flags captured the team win the game or once the time limit has been reached, the team with the biggest number of flags captured wins the game. Killed players will respawn after a few seconds.
- In Infiltration, all players are divided into two teams: a red team and a blue team. A suitcase is placed in a neutral location on the map. Both teams have different objectives: the blue team has to carry the suitcase to a rendezvous point, while the red team is to protect the suitcase at all costs, and to prevent the blue team from taking the suitcase to the rendezvous point. The round ends when either the blue team successfully brings the suitcase to the rendezvous point, the blue team eliminates every member of the red team, or if the red teams eliminates every member of the blue team. Unlike Team Deathmatch and Deathmatch, killed players do not respawn, staying dead until the end of the round.
- In Team Deathmatch, all players are divided into two teams: a red team and a blue team. The objective of Team Deathmatch is to be the first team to hit the frag limit, which can be achieved by killing opposing players, and by avoiding death from opposing players. Once a team hits the frag limit, they win the game and the round finishes. Depending on the admin/creator's choice, friendly fire may or may not be allowed. Killed players will respawn after a few seconds.
- In Deathmatch, players play with the same rules as Team Deathmatch, except that the players will now be playing by themselves. The objective of Deathmatch is to be the first player to hit the frag limit, or to have the highest amount of kills once gametime expires. This can be achieved by killing other players while avoiding death from other players. Once a player hits the frag limit, the player wins the game and the round finishes. Killed players will respawn after a few seconds.
- In Elimination, players play with the same rules as Team Deathmatch, except with one major difference – killed players do not respawn. To objective of the game is to hunt down and kill members of the opposing team players whilst avoiding death. The team that manages to successfully eliminate the other team wins the game. Unlike Team Deathmatch and Deathmatch, killed players do not respawn, staying dead until the end of the round.
- In Demolition, all players are divided into two teams: a red team and a blue team. The blue team's objective is to plant a bomb, which is given to a player at random at the beginning of the round, at one of two bombsites and to ensure its detonation. The red team's objective on the other hand, is to prevent the bomb from being planted by the blue team, and to defuse the bomb before it explodes if the blue team manages to successfully plant it. The round ends when either the blue team successfully ensures the detonation of the bomb, the blue team eliminates every member of the red team, the red team defuses the bomb or the red team successfully eliminates every member of the blue team. Unlike Capture the Flag, Team Deathmatch and Deathmatch, killed players do not respawn, staying dead until the end of the round. This gametype is very similar to the Bomb Defusal gametype of Valve's Counter-Strike series.

== Reception ==
Reception

Aggregate score
Aggregator	Score
Metacritic	(PC) 80/100 (XBOX) 61/100

Review scores
Publication	Score
Eurogamer	6/10 (1P); 9/10 (MP)
GameSpot	8.3/10
IGN	8.8/10

The PC version of Soldier of Fortune II: Double Helix received mostly positive reviews, however, Ivan Zulic of IGN remarked that the game felt rushed, possibly in order to avoid cannibalizing sales of Star Wars Jedi Knight II: Jedi Outcast, an upcoming title from the same company. He also noted that as a result of its apparent premature release, parts of the game seem unbalanced or unpolished, presumably due to a lack of extensive playtesting. The game was a nominee for GameSpot's annual "Best Multiplayer Action Game on PC" award.

The Xbox version was heavily criticized since it did not improve on any of the PC version's flaws despite an additional year of development time, so it did not keep pace with the advancements in competing first-person shooter games. It also had graphics far below what was expected for the Xbox, with bland textures and a low polygon count that led Hector Guzman of GameSpy to describe it as a "PC to Dreamcast to Xbox port".

The game sold 152,000 units in the United States.

== Sequels ==
Based on its success, initially released for Windows, Soldier of Fortune II: Double Helix was later ported to the Xbox. A third game in the series, Soldier of Fortune: Payback, was made by Cauldron HQ and released in 2007. A MMOFPS based on the series, Soldier of Fortune Online, was published in Korea by Dragonfly and went in closed beta on August 12, 2010, and ended on August 16, 2010.
