= Greg Hastings' Tournament Paintball MAX'D =

2005 video game

- Developer: The Whole Experience
- Publisher: Activision
- Designers: WXP, Activision
- Platforms: Game Boy Advance, Nintendo DS, PlayStation 2, Xbox
- Release: 2005 (NA)
- Genres: First-person shooter, sports
- Mode: Multiplayer

Greg Hastings' Tournament Paintball MAX'D is an action sport first-person shooter game developed by The Whole Experience, under joint venture with Paintball Players Productions, LLC, and published by Activision on Xbox, Nintendo DS, Game Boy Advance, and PlayStation 2. It is a spin-off of the Xbox-exclusive Greg Hastings' Tournament Paintball.

GameCube and PlayStation Portable versions were planned, but were cancelled. Despite this, the Wii version of Greg Hastings' Paintball 2, released in 2010, supports the GameCube controller.

== Gameplay ==
The console version of Greg Hastings' Tournament Paintball MAX'D maintains most of the same control elements of the original game. Players can shoot, reload, run, crouch, lie down, stand and switch marker hands. In addition, it is now possible to press a button (or use voice recognition) to give commands while on the field. New additions include ten more tournaments than the original, bringing the total to 29. Also, 12 new markers have been added to the selection.

Two main features of the game that differ from its predecessors are the "breakout manager" and the "create a field". The user can set which bunkers and what shooting styles his or her teammates will exhibit on the break using a screen that is displayed before the action begins. It is also possible to play through the career mode with up to three friends in split-screen co-op.

== Featured professional players/special guest ==
- Greg Hastings (former: Sacramento XSV)
- Chris LaSoya (Infamous)
- Alex Fraige (San Diego Dynasty)
- Keely Watson (Femmes Fatales)
- Rocky Cagnoni (Brimstone Smoke)
- Thomas Taylor (Sacramento XSV)
- Nicky Cuba (former: Sacramento XSV/ Present: LA Infamous)
- Lisa Harvey (Femmes Fatales)
- Oliver Lang (Golden State Ironmen)
- Pete Utschig (Golden State Ironmen)
- DJ Lethal (of the band Limp Bizkit)
- Billy Ceranski (Golden State Ironmen)
- Rich Telford (Sacramento XSV)
- Mike "Grambo" Graham (Mantis Factory)
- B-Real (former: The Stoned Assassins, of the band Cypress Hill)
- Yosh Rau (San Diego Dynasty)
- Matt Marshall (Sacramento XSV)
- Todd Martinez (San Diego Dynasty)
- Anthony Call (Brimstone Smoke)
- John Call (Brimstone Smoke)
- Dylan Paneck (X-Factor)
- Bea Youngs (Team Destiny)
