= Foundation 9 Entertainment =

American video game company

Foundation 9 Entertainment, Inc.
- Type: Private
- Industry: Video games
- Founded: March 29, 2005; 21 years ago in Los Angeles, US
- Founders: Jon Goldman; Andrew Ayre; Douglas Hare; Gary Priest; Mark Loughridge; Richard Hare; Jeff Vavasour; Steven Sardegna; Larry Kelly
- Defunct: 2015
- Fate: Dissolved
- Headquarters: Irvine, California, US
- Key people: Jon Goldman (CEO; 2005–2008); James North-Hearn (CEO; 2008–2015)
- Number of employees: 750+ (2007)
- Website: F9E.com (archived version)

Foundation 9 Entertainment, Inc. was an American video game company based in Irvine, California. The company was formed in March 2005 through the merger of video game developers Backbone Entertainment and The Collective.

== History ==
Foundation 9 Entertainment was founded on March 29, 2005, in Los Angeles, through the merger of video game developer Backbone Entertainment and The Collective. The company's initial management board consisted of Jon Goldman (chief executive officer), Andrew Ayre and Douglas Hare (co-presidents), Gary Priest and Mark Loughridge (co-chairmen), Richard Hare (chief creative officer), Jeff Vavasour (vice-president of Canadian operations), Steven Sardegna (chief financial officer), and Larry Kelly (chief operating officer). Shortly after the merger, on April 12, Foundation 9 acquired and integrated Pipeworks Software. Subsequently, Dan Duncalf, the company's president and co-founder, joined Foundation 9's board of directors. In May, Foundation 9 acquired an equity stake in Circle of Confusion, a Hollywood management company, to establish a strategic partnership.

On June 1, 2006, investment firm Francisco Partners (as advised by UBS Securities) agreed to provide US$150 million in funding to Foundation 9 over a time frame of several years, with additional funding to be provided when needed. The investment was followed by the acquisitions of Shiny Entertainment from Atari in October 2006, Amaze Entertainment and related studios in November 2006, and Sumo Digital and its Indian sub-studio in August 2007. Under the terms of Shiny's acquisition, the studio would co-locate and merge with The Collective. The merger was formally announced in October 2007, at which point both studios had moved to new 60,000-square-foot (5,600 m^{2}) offices in Irvine, California. The amalgam was named Double Helix Games in March 2008. In January 2008, Foundation 9 promoted David Mann (previously chief operating officer), Chris Charla and Jack Brummet to president, vice-president of business development, and vice-president of quality assurance, respectively, followed by James North-Hearn, one of Sumo Digital's founders, becoming the chief executive officer of the company in March.

In July 2008, Foundation 9 reinstated Griptonite Games and Fizz Factor, two studios absorbed into Amaze in 2005, under their original brandings. However, in July 2009, Fizz Factor was closed down entirely, while Amaze was merged into Griptonite and Double Helix suffered staff cuts. FXLabs, based in Hyderabad, India, was acquired by Foundation 9 in October 2010 and became part of Griptonite under the name Griptonite India. Griptonite was sold to Glu Mobile in August 2011 in exchange for 6 million shares of Glu's common stock. Backbone's location in Vancouver had been closed in May 2009, and in October 2012, its ImaginEngine studio was closed as well, while its primary location in Emeryville, California, laid off the majority of its staff. In February 2014, Double Helix was sold to Amazon. Later that year, under advisory from GP Bullhound, Foundation 9 sold Pipeworks to Italian publisher Digital Bros, and Sumo Digital to its own management, the latter of which was backed by NorthEdge Capital. In May 2015, Foundation 9's board of directors elected to dissolve what remained of the company, including its remaining division Backbone Entertainment.

== Subsidiaries ==
- Amaze Entertainment (2004–2009) – Merged into Griptonite Games
  - Adrenium
  - Griptonite Games
  - KnowWonder (1996–2004) – PC game studio
  - Fizz Factor - Handheld game studio
  - Black Ship Games
- Backbone Entertainment (2005–2015) – Closed
  - Backbone Charlottetown (2006–2007) – Spun off from Backbone and renamed Other Ocean Interactive
  - Backbone Emeryville (2005–2015) – Became a subsidiary of Other Ocean Group and renamed Digital Eclipse
  - Backbone Vancouver (2005–2009) – Closed
  - Games2Learn – Closed
  - ImaginEngine (2005–2012) – Closed
- The Collective (2005–2007) – Merged into Double Helix Games
- Double Helix Games (2007–2014) – Sold to Amazon Game Studios
- Fizz Factor (2008–2009) – Closed
- Griptonite Games (2008–2011) – Sold to Glu Mobile
  - Griptonite India (2010–2011) – Sold to Glu Mobile
- Pipeworks Software (2005–2014) – Sold to Digital Bros
- Shiny Entertainment (2006–2007) – Merged into Double Helix Games
- Sumo Digital (2007–2014) – Sold back to founders in a management buyout
  - Sumo India (2007–2014) – Sold back to founders in a management buyout
