= Road Champs: BXS Stunt Biking =

2000 video game

- Developer: HotGen Ltd
- Publisher: Activision
- Platform: Game Boy Color
- Release: 10 December 2000
- Genre: Sports
- Mode: Single-player

Road Champs: BXS Stunt Biking is a 2000 video game developed by London-based studio HotGen and published by Activision for the Game Boy Color.

== Gameplay ==
Gameplay screenshot

The game features several play modes which are unlocked in sequence. In Training Mode, players can practice tricks and stunts, with a tutorial on gameplay mechanics across 26 stages. Career Mode features a series of matches, with players progressing through Amateur to Pro by completing challenges. Tournament Mode features a series vert and street challenges in a tournament league. The main game modes feature 27 levels across 64 stages of competition. Single Run allows players to select a rider and race in levels completed in the Career or Tournament mode.

== Reception ==
Reception

Review scores
Publication	Score
Computer and Video Games	4/5
Electronic Gaming Monthly	6.75/10
Game Informer	7.75/10
GameSpot	6.9/10
Hyper	8/10
IGN	8/10

Several critics remarked that the game was a strong handheld extreme sports title, comparable with the Tony Hawk's Pro Skater handheld series. Computer & Video Games praised the game's progression, finding the game "gets better the more you play" due to unlocking new areas and skills, although found the game challenging. Describing the game as "surprisingly playable, complex, visually impressive and fun", Frank Dry of Hyper praised the game's wide variety of moves and "fluid and realistic bike movements". Frank Provo of GameSpot considered the gameplay to be enjoyable, but felt the game "doesn't break any new ground" and "is a bit light in the way of overall variety".
