= Over the Hedge: Hammy Goes Nuts! =

2006 video game

- Developers: Vicarious Visions (GBA); Amaze Entertainment (PSP, DS)
- Publisher: Activision
- Producer: DreamWorks Animation
- Platforms: Game Boy Advance, Nintendo DS, PlayStation Portable
- Release: Game Boy Advance, Nintendo DS: NA: October 12, 2006 (GBA); NA: October 24, 2006 (DS); EU: October 27, 2006; AU: November 1, 2006; PlayStation Portable: NA: November 21, 2006; AU: December 13, 2006; EU: February 16, 2007
- Genres: Sports (GBA); Action-adventure (DS); Platform (PSP)
- Modes: Single-player, multiplayer

Over the Hedge: Hammy Goes Nuts! is a video game published by Activision based on characters from the film Over the Hedge. The Game Boy Advance (GBA) version, a miniature golf game, was developed by Vicarious Visions and released in October 2006 in North America. The Nintendo DS and PlayStation Portable (PSP) versions, an action adventure game and a platform game respectively, were both developed by Amaze Entertainment and were released on October 24, 2006 and November 21, 2006. It is the second and last game to be based on the film.

The plot of the GBA version focuses on Hammy, a hyperactive squirrel from Over the Hedge, who learns how to play golf after his cable goes out, while the PSP version follows Hammy's attempts to get his cable back, and the DS iteration follows the characters' attempts to get Boris the Beaver material for his dam. Hammy Goes Nuts! received mediocre reviews for all of its versions; the DS and PSP versions were criticized for generic elements and control issues, while the GBA game was brought down from its repetitive nature and low amount of content.

== Gameplay ==
The bottom screen of the DS version shows the character controlled by the player, while the top displays a minimap with the player's location and the time limit left in the level.

=== Game Boy Advance ===
The Game Boy Advance version of Hammy Goes Nuts! is a miniature golf game. The plot follows Hammy after his cable goes out; his friends teach him golf to pass the time without his television. Hammy finds that golf can be used to destroy stuff, and decides to use it to cause mischief. The game requires the player to break human objects by bouncing the ball off of them, while also completing each hole in a certain number of strokes. In order to succeed, the player controls Hammy from a top down view, and makes him move obstacles which are in the player's path so the course can be completed. After the obstacles have been moved, the player presses a button and the camera shifts to one of Hammy's friends from Over the Hedge, and the player takes the shot. The game contains a challenge mode after courses have been completed which contains more obstacles and allows for less strokes, and features a more traditional miniature golf mode without obstacles.

=== Nintendo DS ===
The Nintendo DS version of Hammy Goes Nuts! is an action adventure game. The game follows Hammy in his attempts to help Boris the Beaver create a dam; in order to get the materials for the dam, Hammy and his friends set elaborate traps to fool the pest control man in order to be able to steal his tools throughout the neighborhood. The player must complete a series of fetch quests in order to get the required materials. The gameplay is shown on the bottom screen, where the player controls Hammy; the top screen has a map which shows the entire level from a top-down view, and shows a picture of a human from the level who is asleep and counting sheep. The human serves as a timer, as once they wake up, the player loses. The game is controlled using exclusively the touch screen.

=== PlayStation Portable ===
The PSP version of the game is a platform game. The plot follows Hammy in his attempts to destroy the satellite reception of the neighborhood after the "Tool Guy" he was stealing cables from switches over to it resulting in Hammy losing his cable. Hammy and his friends help Boris, but as they discover that Boris wants to build a new dam, they stop him and succeed. In the single player campaign, the game makes the player play as one of three characters depending on the level, and each has a separate special power. The game otherwise contains standard platform and action elements such as jumping and attacking. The PSP version contains multiplayer compatibility between different PSPs.

== Plot ==
Hammy is watching television when it goes out. Hammy freaks outs and Verne comes over to see what is wrong. It is revealed that the house they borrow their cable from has been reconfigured to satellite. Hammy is at a loss for words, as this means that watching television is now impossible. This causes RJ to lead a mission where the three try to rewire the dish. In the middle of the mission, they find a beaver named Boris locked in a cage. After freeing him, he agrees to help Hammy get the television working again for the price of helping him gather supplies for a dam.

After gathering enough supplies, Boris reveals his true colors by leaving the animals and building his dam. After the animals notice the flooding, they travel to the dam to put a stop to Boris' plan. Hammy defeats Boris and saves the forest. Boris then leaves a note, saying he has gone to a different city to build a smaller, much more stable dam.

== Reception ==
Reception

Aggregate scores
Aggregator	Score		
Aggregator	DS	GBA	PSP
GameRankings	57.27%	60.00%	64.40%
Metacritic	52/100	N/A	58/100

Review scores
Publication	Score		
Publication	DS	GBA	PSP
GameSpy	N/A	N/A	3/5
GameZone	7.0/10	N/A	N/A
IGN	4.8/10	6.5/10	N/A
Nintendo World Report	6/10	N/A	N/A

Over the Hedge: Hammy Goes Nuts! received mostly mediocre reviews from gaming critics for all its different versions; it received 64.4%, 60%, and 57.27% review aggregate scores for its Game Boy Advance, PSP, and DS versions from GameRankings respectively. IGN's Jack DeVries called the Game Boy Advance version of the game "innovative", but criticized the game's repetitive nature; he also called the DS version "a snorefest" and derided its control scheme. GameSpy's David Chapman praised the PSP's multiplayer games, stating that, "each one is a blast to play with friends", but he felt the single player mode was incredibly cookie cutter and standard. GameZone felt that the DS version would appeal to children due to its ease of play.
