= Soldier of Fortune (video game) =

2000 video game

- Developers: Raven Software; Loki Software (Linux); Runecraft (DC); Pipe-Dream Interactive (PS2)
- Publishers: Activision (Windows); Loki Software (Linux); Crave Entertainment (DC); Majesco (PS2)
- Director: Brian Raffel
- Producer: Marty Stratton
- Designer: Jim Hughes
- Programmer: Rick Johnson
- Artists: Joe Koberstein; Scott Rice
- Composer: Chia Chin Lee
- Engine: Quake II engine
- Platforms: Windows, Linux, Dreamcast, PlayStation 2
- Release: Windows: NA: March 28, 2000; EU: April 1, 2000; Linux; July 14, 2000; Dreamcast: NA: July 26, 2001; EU: 2001; PlayStation 2: NA: November 13, 2001; EU: July 5, 2002
- Genre: First-person shooter
- Modes: Single-player, multiplayer

Soldier of Fortune is a first-person shooter video game developed by Raven Software and published by Activision in 2000 for Windows. It was later released for the PlayStation 2 (as Soldier of Fortune: Gold Edition), as well as the Dreamcast, while Loki Software also made a port for Linux. It was digitally re-released on GOG.com on October 2, 2018, along with its two successors. A version for Xbox was planned but never released. The player takes on the role of a U.S. mercenary as he trots around the globe hoping to halt a terrorist nuclear weapons plot.

The game, which was built with the Quake II engine, is notable for its realistic depictions of violence, made possible by the GHOUL engine, including the dismemberment of human bodies. This was the game's stylistic attraction and it caused considerable controversy, especially in Canada and Germany, where it was classified as a restricted-rated film and listed on the Federal Agency for Media Harmful to Young People, respectively. The technology creates 26 different zones on the bodies of enemies, allowing for vastly different reactions depending upon which one is targeted.

The game sold well initially and critical reception was positive. Two sequels were released: Soldier of Fortune II: Double Helix (2002) and Soldier of Fortune: Payback (2007). Soldier of Fortune Online, a massively multiplayer online first-person shooter, was published in Korea in 2010, but its servers were shut down shortly after its release.

== Gameplay ==
Exploding an enemy's head using the GHOUL engine

Soldier of Fortune is best known for its graphic depictions of firearms dismembering the human body. This graphic violence is the game's main stylistic attraction, much like the destructible environments of Red Faction or bullet time of Max Payne (both 2001). The GHOUL engine enables depiction of extreme graphic violence, in which character models are based on body parts that can each independently sustain damage (gore zones). There are 26 zones in total: a shot to the head with a powerful gun will often make the target's head explode, leaving nothing but the bloody stump of the neck remaining; a close-range shot to the stomach with a shotgun will leave an enemy's bowels in a bloody mess, and a shot to the nether regions will cause the victims to clutch their groin in agony for a few seconds before kneeling over dead. It is possible to shoot off an enemy's limbs (head, arms, legs) leaving nothing left but a bloody torso. In the final mission, players gain access to a fictional microwave weapon that causes enemies to either fry or explode, depending on the firing mode. However, nonviolence is a possibility, if the player is a good shot it is possible to shoot an enemy's weapon out of their hand, causing them to cower on the floor to surrender. The game also came with password-protected options to disable all gore and there is even a version of the game with the extreme violence permanently locked-out, titled Soldier of Fortune: Tactical Low-Violence Version.

=== Multiplayer ===
In multiplayer mode, there are seven gametypes: Arsenal, Assassination, Capture the Flag, Conquer the Bunker, Control, Deathmatch and Realistic Deathmatch.

== Plot ==
The story involves the theft of nuclear weapons, and the main enemy turns out to be an Afrikaner neo-fascist group based in Germany, led by South African exile Sergei Dekker. At the beginning of the game, terrorists steal four nuclear weapons from a storage facility in Russia, and proceed to sell them to various nations. This is a prelude to the acquisition of advanced weapons of mass destruction by this terrorist group. John Mullins, working for a U.S.-based mercenary ("soldier of fortune") organization known only as "The Shop", and his partner, Aaron "Hawk" Parsons, are assigned to prevent the nukes from falling into the wrong hands, and stop the terrorists in their plans. His missions take him to New York City, Sudan, Siberia, Tokyo, Kosovo, Iraq, Uganda and finally Germany.

== Development ==
Raven Software acquired a license from the monthly U.S. periodical magazine Soldier of Fortune (SOF) to produce a video game based on the publication. The game was built around a modified version of the Quake II engine. It was the first game to utilize the GHOUL damage model engine developed by Raven Software. This introduced the ability to dismember enemies in combat, adding to the realism of the game. Upgraded versions of the GHOUL system were later used in other Raven titles, such as Soldier of Fortune II: Double Helix and Star Wars Jedi Knight II: Jedi Outcast (both 2002).

The game was originally supposed to be much more realistic, featuring mostly real weapons, and the players taking damage would impede their movement and dexterity, depending on where and how many times they were hit. In 1998 the game was also supposed to be partially based in Bosnia and Herzegovina instead of Kosovo.

The game is AMD Eyefinity validated. The game also made use of the Aureal Semiconductor A3D and Creative Labs EAX technology.

=== Rerelease ===
GOG.com re-released Soldier of Fortune alongside its two successors digitally on October 1, 2018.

== Reception ==
Reception

Aggregate scores
Aggregator	Score		
Aggregator	Dreamcast	PC	PS2
GameRankings	71%	82%	56%
Metacritic	70/100	N/A	59/100

Review scores
Publication	Score		
Publication	Dreamcast	PC	PS2
CNET Gamecenter	N/A	8/10	N/A
Computer Gaming World	N/A	2.5/5	N/A
Electronic Gaming Monthly	5.5/10 (Note: Three critics of Electronic Gaming Monthly gave the Dreamcast version each a score of 4/10, 6.5/10, and 6/10.)	N/A	5/10
EP Daily	7/10	7/10	N/A
Eurogamer	N/A	9/10	N/A
Game Informer	7.75/10	7.25/10	4/10
GameRevolution	N/A	B+	C−
GameSpot	7.3/10	7.7/10	7.3/10
GameSpy	7/10	80%	N/A
IGN	8.5/10	9/10	4.5/10
Next Generation	3/5	4/5	N/A
Official U.S. PlayStation Magazine	N/A	N/A	3/5
PC Accelerator	N/A	9/10	N/A
PC Gamer (US)	N/A	87%	N/A

The PC's original release received "generally positive reviews" according to the review aggregation website GameRankings. Robert Howarth of GameFan gave the PC version 91% and wrote, "for those adults looking for extreme action, Soldier of Fortune could be just what the doctor ordered." Howarth considered its story to be "on par" with many action movies; he also commented that the GHOUL damage model rendering system was "an amazing technology".

Chris Kramer of NextGen's June 2000 issue wrote of the PC original, "Sure, it's not for kids, but it's as good an FPS as you could ever ask for." 15 issues later, Jim Preston called the Dreamcast version "An OK port of an OK game."

Robert Mayer of Computer Games Strategy Plus gave the PC version four stars out of five, saying, "Raven Software set out to make a shooter, and they've made a damn fine one. Just be sure you're up to it before you dive in. It gets mighty bloody in there." Edge gave the same PC version seven out of ten, calling it "an above-average firstperson shooter. It doesn't bring much to the genre, save for its gory depiction of violence."

Cal Nguyen of AllGame gave the PC version four-and-a-half stars out of five, saying, "If you're bent on eliminating terrorist threats by skinheads, Saddam Hussein's army, Russian mafias or even New York mobsters, then take a lesson from the Soldier of Fortune [sic] and tear open a new one." Later, J.C. Barnes gave the Dreamcast version three-and-a-half stars out of five, calling it "a solid shooter that doesn't break new ground in graphics, sound or artificial intelligence, but it's a solid shooter worth some attention. Aside from the tricky controls and lighting issues, FPS fans shouldn't be too disappointed with this single-player adventure."

Nash Werner of GamePro said of the PC version, "With its well-written storyline and thought-provoking missions, SoF's singleplayer will keep you thrilled for hours, and you'll probably be playing the Assassin mode for months. Despite ridiculously long load times, Soldier of Fortune is recommended for everyone who appreciates a good FPS." (Note: GamePro gave the PC version 4.5/5 for graphics, 3.5/5 for sound, 3/5 for control, and 4/5 for fun factor.) Jake the Snake said of the Dreamcast version, "If you're longing for some over-the-top shooting with real weapons, Soldier of Fortune hits its mark with extreme prejudice, but less gonzo gamers should steer clear." (Note: GamePro gave the Dreamcast version 3.5/5 for graphics, and three 4/5 scores for sound, control, and fun factor.) However, The D-Pad Destroyer said of the PlayStation 2 version, "with all its faults, Fortune is fairly fun for hardcore soldier types, but everyone else will just want to keep their membership in Red Faction." (Note: GamePro gave the PlayStation 2 version 2.5/5 for graphics, 3/5 for sound, 4/5 for control, and 3.5/5 for fun factor.) Nick Valentino of GameZone gave the same console version 6 out of 10, saying that it was "just another FPS trying to jump on the bandwagon of other successful titles and sorely misses the mark. With very little to offer in terms of design or new features, it fails to capture the right FPS feel which other games have effectively achieved. In other words, look someplace else."

According to PC Data, a firm that tracked sales in the U.S., the PC version sold 100,919 units by November 2000. NPD Techworld, which also covered the U.S., reported 298,563 units sold for said PC version by December 2002.

=== Violence controversy ===
In 2000, after receiving a complaint from a member of the public about the explicit content of the game, the British Columbia Film Classification Office (BCFCO) investigated and decided the violence, gore and acts of torture were not suitable for persons under 18 years of age. In a controversial decision, the game was labeled an "adult motion picture" and was rated as a pornographic film. In Germany, the game was placed on the Index List of the Federal Agency for Media Harmful to Young People.

== Sequels ==
Based on its success, Raven Software and Activision later published Soldier of Fortune II: Double Helix in 2002, based on the Quake III: Team Arena engine. Initially released for Windows, the sequel was later ported to the Xbox.

A third game in the series, Soldier of Fortune: Payback was made by Cauldron HQ and released on November 14, 2007.

An MMOFPS based on the series, Soldier of Fortune Online, was published in South Korea by Dragonfly and went in Closed Beta on August 12, 2010 and ended on August 16, 2010.
