= Soldier of Fortune: Payback =

2007 video game

- Developer: Cauldron HQ
- Publisher: Activision
- Producer: Jozef Hudec
- Designer: Martin Hornák
- Programmer: Marián Suran
- Artist: Ľuboš Lednár
- Composer: Juraj Karkuš
- Engine: CloakNT
- Platforms: Microsoft Windows, Xbox 360, PlayStation 3
- Release: Microsoft Windows: NA: November 13, 2007; EU: December 7, 2007; AU: March 19, 2008; Xbox 360: NA: November 13, 2007; EU: December 7, 2007; AU: April 23, 2008; PlayStation 3: NA: November 20, 2007; AU: March 5, 2008; EU: April 11, 2008
- Genre: First-person shooter
- Modes: Single-player, multiplayer

Soldier of Fortune: Payback is a first-person shooter video game and the third installment in the Soldier of Fortune franchise, following Soldier of Fortune II: Double Helix. It is the first game in the series released for the Xbox 360 and PlayStation 3. The game was released on November 13, 2007. The storyline revolves around a revenge plot against a global terrorist organization.

Unlike the previous two Soldier of Fortune games, which were developed by Raven Software using the id Tech 2 and id Tech 3 engines created by id Software, Payback was developed by Cauldron HQ.

The game received tepid to mostly negative reviews, with critics noting that while the visuals were appealing, the gameplay was uninspired. As with the previous games in the series, Payback featured detailed character modeling and gore effects. Due to its high level of violence, the Office of Film and Literature Classification in Australia refused to classify the game. Following the ban, a modified version was released on April 23, 2008, which removed extreme violence and dismemberment.

== Plot ==
After freelance mercenary Thomas Mason (Kyle Hebert) is betrayed by his comrade during a mission, he vows revenge against a global terrorist organization whose operatives are all marked with the same tattoo on their necks.

== Development ==
Originally, this game began life as a budget title developed under the working name Mercenaries Wanted and was never originally intended to be based on the Soldier of Fortune license. A few months prior to its release, Activision saw potential for a full-priced launch and decided to brand the game under the existing Soldier of Fortune series. This title's elements, particularly the game's cutscenes, were created at the last minute in an effort to tie the story to the series. The game was developed using the CloakNT engine, a proprietary 3D graphics engine created by Cauldron HQ to manage first-person shooter mechanics and physics simulations.

John Mullins, the protagonist from the previous games, was initially intended to appear as a mentor or partner character who would work alongside Mason throughout the narrative. Mullins was supposed to reveal that years of combat and the aftermath of the second game had turned him into a greedy, bloodthirsty figure, ultimately leading to his betrayal of Mason. Mullins was removed from the final version of the game since it had absolutely no direct connection to the SOF, Raven Software weren't involved, and the real-life John Mullins was no longer consulting or associated with the budget project, and because turning a real-world, highly decorated war hero into a corrupt, backstabbing villain could cause legal and PR issues so the idea was scrapped. Instead, a new, similar-looking character named Colonel Miller was introduced in his place, allowing the betrayal plot to be retained.

== Reception ==
Reception

Aggregate score
| Aggregator | Score |
|---|---|
| Metacritic | (PC) 45/100 (PS3) 50/100 (X360) 50/100 |

Review scores
| Publication | Score |
|---|---|
| Eurogamer | 3/10 |
| GameSpot | 4.5/10 |
| GameSpy | 1.5/5 |
| GamesRadar+ | 3/5 |
| GameZone | 6/10 |
| IGN | 5.9/10 |

The game received negative reviews. While most critics praised its character modeling and gore effects, they criticized the gameplay and overall execution. Jason Ocampo of GameSpot gave it a score of 4.5/10, stating, "This shooter is a great exercise in pattern memorization and trial-and-error gameplay." He also remarked that it "looks pretty." Jay Frechette of 1Up.com rated the game 5.5/10, commenting, "Soldier of Fortune doesn't cross the line of being a bad game, but it hardly ever breaks the surface of mediocrity either."

=== Bans ===
On October 16, 2007, the game was refused classification by Australia's federal classification board, the Office of Film & Literature Classification (OFLC). This effectively banned the game throughout Australia, as video games that have been refused OFLC classification cannot be sold, advertised, or imported. Activision modified the game to meet OFLC standards, and it was re-classified with an MA15+ rating. This version does not include radical violence; dismemberment was completely removed. Activision released the modified game in Australia on April 23, 2008.

The original version was placed on the index of Germany's Federal Department for Media Harmful to Young Persons (BPjM) even before it was officially released in the country. It was subsequently banned nationwide.

A censored version was briefly listed on Steam.
