= Cabela's Outdoor Adventures (2009 video game) =

2009 video game

- Developer: Fun Labs
- Publishers: Activision; Zoo Digital Publishing
- Platforms: PlayStation 2, PlayStation 3, Wii, Xbox 360, Windows
- Release: NA: September 8, 2009, October 13, 2009 (Win)
- Genre: Simulation
- Mode: Single-player

Cabela's Outdoor Adventures is a hunting video game released only in North America on September 8, 2009 by Activision for home consoles, and on October 13, 2009 for Microsoft Windows.

The game was announced by Activision in a press release in July 2009. There are over 50 hunting and fishing adventures and intensive use of gear and tactics. Emphasis is placed on moments that are instinctively associated with hunting and fishing. New to the series is a reworked shooting system known as VITALS (Visually Integrated Targeting and Lock-on System) that allows the player to focus on delivering an accurate shot to the prey's vitals. The game received favorable reviews from critics, with praise given for improvement from previous installments of the series. Unlike the first game, this one only has the story mode and lets players shoot whatever they encounter.

== Gameplay ==
The game features North America's top outdoor destinations, over 50 hunting and fishing adventures and intensive use of gear and tactics, such as animal calls and stealth skills. Emphasis is placed on moments that are instinctively associated with hunting and fishing, like deer stalking, squeezing the trigger, hooking a fish or snap-shooting a flushed bird, all while respecting real life hunting rules and regulations. Players can also upgrade their hunting gear with authentically branded real life equipment. It features fishing, bird hunting, and hunting for bigger game. In the 50 planned outings that are available for play, virtual outdoorsmen can set their sights on great variety of a herd animals, predators, and game birds, or cast a line for several species of fresh and saltwater fish. Multiple difficulty levels are available, with a tutorial mode for less experienced hunters and gamers.

New to the series is a reworked shooting system known as VITALS (Visually Integrated Targeting and Lock-on System) that allows the player to focus on delivering an accurate shot to the prey's vitals, while also creating a closer and more personal view of the animals as they react realistically to being hunted.

== Plot ==
The player assumes the role of an unnamed hunter traveling across North America on a series of guided hunting expeditions. The journey begins in Kansas, where the hunter pursues white-tailed deer while also participating in hunts for pheasants, ducks, turkeys, rabbits, and other small game, as well as fishing activities. The hunter later travels to Idaho to hunt Rocky Mountain elk, mule deer, mountain goats, coyotes, and other wildlife, with additional fishing and bird-hunting excursions included throughout the trip.

The expedition continues in British Columbia, where the hunter tracks Columbian blacktail deer, woodland caribou, and black bears in forested and mountainous terrain. The final destination is Alaska, where the hunter pursues moose, brown bears, waterfowl, and an elusive piebald Sitka deer that serves as the culmination of the campaign. Across all regions, the gameplay combines guided hunts, tracking sequences, fishing challenges, and the use of a variety of firearms and hunting equipment.

== Development ==
In a press release in July 2009, Activision announced that the game was going to be released in fall 2009 for the Xbox 360, PlayStation 2, PlayStation 3, Wii and PC. It was going to feature "a simulation-style, seamlessly integrated experience that includes big game hunting, fishing and bird shooting". David Oxford of Activision Publishing stated "Never before has a Cabela's game had so much variety. We went back to the drawing board with the folks at Cabela's and listened closely to the serious enthusiasts of each of these disciplines to make sure Cabela's Outdoor Adventures is the most complete game ever for sportsmen". Bryan Stave of Cabela's commented "I commend Activision for their commitment to simulating the outdoor sports in a challenging, fun and exciting format. Cabela's Outdoor Adventures gives real enthusiasts their fix when they can't be in a forest or on a lake".

== Reception ==
Reception

Aggregate score
Aggregator	Score
GameRankings	65% (X360) 69% (PS3); 70% (Wii) 70% (PS2)

Review scores
Publication	Score
IGN	7/10
Official Xbox Magazine (US)	6/10
GameFocus	7.3/10 (X360)
PSX Extreme	6.8/10

The game received mixed reviews from critics. For the Xbox 360 version, GameFocus stated that it "was able to see an improvement from most of past Cabela games". Lucas Thomas from IGN noted "It's got a few issues and the fishing's mostly phoned in, but Outdoor Adventures may well be a decent option for aspiring woodsmen this season". While Official Xbox Magazine called the game "A decent hunting adventure". PSX Extreme editor Ben Dutka commented "Cabela's Outdoor Adventures is an okay production that has some nice elements and makes a valiant effort to be well worth the $40 price tag. It falls just a little shy".

For the Wii version, IGN's Lucas Thomas stated "Diving into this one is quick and easy, and you can play for short periods of time and still see a lot of action, instead of just sitting around and waiting for hours for bucks and birds to wander by".
