= Over the Hedge (Nintendo DS video game) =

2006 video game

- PAL region cover art
- Developer: Vicarious Visions
- Publisher: Activision
- Producer: DreamWorks Animation
- Platform: Nintendo DS
- Release: NA: May 9, 2006; EU: June 9, 2006; AU: June 14, 2006
- Genres: Platform, stealth
- Modes: Single-player, multiplayer

Over the Hedge is a platform video game with stealth elements developed by Vicarious Visions and published by Activision for the Nintendo DS handheld video game console. It was first released in North America, and was later released in Europe. The game is set immediately after the events of the DreamWorks movie Over the Hedge, just like its adaptations on consoles.

Gameplay involves guiding three playable woodland creatures through suburban houses to collect items and return them to their forest. House inhabitants and traps must be avoided or neutralized to succeed. The game's plot concerns Gladys Sharp's attempt to turn what is left of the animals' forest into a swimming pool; the animals try to prevent this by luring endangered species to the forest, making the forest a protected habitat. Over the Hedge received positive and average reviews from the gaming press, as well as gaming website IGN's 'Best Game No One Played' award for 2006. The game was praised for the technical achievement of displaying full 3D on both of the Nintendo DS' screens, but some reviewers found the gameplay repetitive.

== Gameplay ==
Verne encounters one of the inhabitants while exploring a house. The red cone on the lower screen shows the man's sight range.

In Over the Hedge, the player controls one of three animals, who attempt to steal items and destroy construction materials from suburban homes. The player must explore three-dimensional households in order to complete these objectives, while avoiding the residents and their pets. If the player is spotted, they must escape from the enemy's line of sight, otherwise the player will fail the level. Each level requires several trips to be completed. Security systems must be avoided or deactivated in order to progress through each level.

Each character has their own unique abilities. Verne has the strength to push and carry large items and can retract into his shell in order to avoid detection, but cannot jump as high or run as swift as the other characters. RJ has average strength and agility. He can climb, lift items and also throw Verne. Hammy is the most agile of the three, running swifter and jumping higher. This enables him to circumvent security more easily.

Over the Hedge is presented in full 3D on both of the Nintendo DS' screens, which is not often seen in a Nintendo DS game. The upper screen displays the game in an over-the-shoulder third person perspective, whereas the touch screen shows an overhead perspective. The lower screen indicates the sight range of enemies and can be used as a touch screen to target enemies to attack. The console's microphone is used to attract the attention of dogs or to rouse the woodland creatures should they be knocked unconscious.

=== Multiplayer ===
A multiplayer mini-game is included and allows two players to compete via the DS' wireless connection, only one player needs an Over the Hedge game cartridge for two separate DS consoles to play. Stella the skunk is available in this game mode, alongside the three playable characters from the main game. Players navigate a maze to collect food before the timer runs out. The player with the most food wins the game. At most five pieces of food can be carried at once, these must be carried to a collection area before more food can be picked up.

== Plot ==
Over the Hedge is set immediately after the events of the animated film. Gladys Sharp, president of the homeowners' association, returns and plans to bulldoze the forest in order to build a swimming pool. She has been joined by a new character, Henri Smith, a taxidermist and Dwayne's brother. Given an idea from Hammy, RJ decides to have endangered species move to the forest in order to have it declared a protected habitat, preventing its destruction. The householders have been warned about RJ and company's intentions, and have created traps from everyday objects to repel the thieves. The animals manage to gather supplies so that a black-footed ferret salesman named Jack, a gray bat scientist named Sylvia, and an ivory-billed woodpecker retiree named Samson can live in the forest. As a last resort, Gladys kidnaps the friends of RJ, Verne and Hammy for Henri. So the trio hack into the security cameras of the house and lure Gladys ranting into them. Once the news and police hear this, both humans get arrested for trying to capture endangered animals. Afterwards, the animals then continue to steal food.

== Development ==
Unlike the home console versions, the Nintendo DS version of Over the Hedge was created as a separate game by Vicarious Visions. Game writer Evan Skolnick noted the original goal was to make a simple tie-in game with the film, but the development team was soon instructed by Activision to "knock this one out of the park". As a result, Vicarious Visions decided to write a new story, and create in-game cutscenes using full motion video (FMV). The use of FMV was unusual for the Nintendo DS due to software limitations, such as only having one 3D engine and ROM space restrictions. In a 2007 Game Developers Conference lecture, programmers Chuck Hommick and Gregory Oberg explained how the company avoided many of these obstacles by not including fog or night levels, and by using texture matrices in animated cutscenes. Due to budgetary constraints, only the first two cutscenes were fully animated. The rest were static images with text captions, typically found in Nintendo DS games. Craig Harris of IGN called Over the Hedge "one of the most impressive Nintendo DS products this year - at least on a technical level".

== Reception ==
Reception

Aggregate scores
Aggregator	Score
GameRankings	73%
Metacritic	71/100

Review scores
Publication	Score
GameSpot	5.4/10
GameZone	6/10
IGN	8.2/10
Nintendo World Report	6/10

The game received both positive and average reviews from the gaming press, with an average score of 73% from both GameRankings and a 71 from Metacritic. Over the Hedge was awarded IGN's "Best Game No One Played" in the Nintendo DS category during their 2006 Game Of The Year awards.

Several reviewers were impressed by the game's 3D graphics, considering the graphical limitations of the Nintendo DS. GameZone's Louis Bedigian commented "Three-dimensional worlds are such a rarity on the DS that you'll definitely take notice". In particular, the technical accomplishment of using the DS' two screens to show gameplay in two different angles and in full 3D was praised.

Critics are divided over the game's difficulty level and target audience. Some found the game too easy for adult players. Nintendo World Report's Lasse Pallesen stated Over the Hedge is not engaging to adults or children due to "the repetitive collect-a-thon nature of the game and the one-dimensional gameplay". GameZone's Louis Bedigian had similar reservations, "Players young and old will be turned off by the lack of excitement". Other reviewers felt the game was suitable for children and adults. Deeko's Pete Sellers found the game "a well designed adventure that requires patience and planning".

Some reviewers found the gameplay, focused mainly on collecting and returning objects, as repetitive. In his GameSpot review, Frank Provo stated "Games geared toward younger players are typically repetitive, but Over the Hedge for the Nintendo DS sets a new standard for repetition". He lists one of the negative aspects of the game as "Whole game feels like housecleaning or a real estate tour". GameZone's Louis Bedigian also found the game repetitive, saying "..the game stays far away from anything deep, opting for a simplistic series of missions that redefine the meaning of the word rehash".
