= Spanish for Everyone! =

2007 video game

- Developer: Humagade
- Publisher: Activision
- Platform: Nintendo DS
- Release: NA: October 23, 2007
- Genre: Educational
- Mode: Single-player

Spanish for Everyone! is a 2007 language-learning Nintendo DS video game published by Activision. It was created and developed by an independent company, Humagade. It gained notoriety when its cutscenes, which contain subliminal stereotypical messages, were released on YouTube. The game's lead designer, Eric "EEX" Latouche, commented on OverClocked ReMix regarding the storyline and gameplay, clarifying that the game's undertones were intentional. The game has been mocked for its absurd storyline and its variously racist and inappropriate undertones.

== Plot ==
Spanish for Everyone! begins as Shawn, a boy from the United States, lets another boy named Miguel borrow his brother's Nintendo DS. Miguel's father pulls up in his limousine and orders Miguel to get in. Before Miguel can return the DS, the limousine abruptly takes off for Mexico, pursued by two police cars. Shawn's purported aunt, Gina Vasquez, arrives and offers to give him a ride to Tijuana and to teach him Spanish on the way.

In Tijuana, Gina sees a pickup truck carrying a bull, which she surmises belongs to Shawn's grandfather. Shawn gets into the bed of the truck and discovers that the bull can talk. The bull, believing his encounter with Shawn is part of an ancient bovine prophecy, agrees to teach him Spanish, which he calls "the language that will thwart evil." Shawn exits the truck in the fictional ghost town of La Zorra as the bull, fated to die in a bullfight, continues on. Exploring the town, Shawn meets Tío Juan, his uncle, who is now an "exporter" to the United States and has "unfinished business" with Miguel's father in Ensenada. He offers Shawn a ride to Ensenada in his jeep and helps him learn Spanish along the way.

Shawn and Tío Juan reach Ensenada, and Juan states that he will not be able to bring Shawn back to the United States. Miguel returns the DS, and as Shawn walks away from Miguel's house, a group of six cars pulls up on the front driveway. As gunfire can be heard in the background, the game sets up a potential sequel by explaining that Juan left a box for Shawn filled with "many puffy dolls", an airplane ticket, and a message asking Shawn to deliver the package to his "friend", Gustave Charlot, in France.

== Reception ==
Decrying the game's plot as encouraging unsafe or illegal practices and criticizing its gameplay as having poor English grammar and questionable teaching ability, IGN rated the game 2.0/10, saying: "we can't recommend this piece of garbage to anyone."

The game was named the 10th most racist video game of all time by Complex.

== See also ==
- Educational video game
