= Threewave Software =

Threewave Software, Inc.
- Type: Private
- Industry: Software & programming
- Founded: Vancouver, British Columbia, Canada (1994)
- Founder: Michael Goodhead; Dan Gold; Michael Labbe
- Headquarters: Vancouver, British Columbia, Canada
- Key people: Michael Goodhead(CEO)
- Products: Multiplayer video games
- Number of employees: 50+
- Website: www.threewavesoftware.com

Threewave Software, Inc is a videogame developer based in Vancouver, British Columbia, Canada. They are best known for the development of Threewave CTF.

The company has taken on contract work for companies such as Activision, EA, Valve and LucasArts.

They are licensed to develop using the Source engine, id Tech, Unreal Engine, and the Infernal Engine.

The Studio's Executive Team consists of Dan Irish, CEO.
